= Murder of Patricia Lonergan =

1943 murder in New York City, United States

- Location: New York City, N.Y. U.S.
- Date: October 24, 1943; 83 years ago
- Attack type: Murder by blunt force trauma and asphyxiation (strangulation)
- Weapon: Candelabra
- Victims: Patricia Hartley Burton Bernheimer Lonergan, aged 22
- Perpetrator: Wayne Lonergan
- Motive: Marriage dissatisfaction and irreconcilable differences, being cut out of will following William Burton's death in 1940
- Verdict: Guilty
- Convictions: Second degree murder
- Sentence: 35 years to life in prison (released after 22 years)

Patricia Hartley Burton Bernheimer Lonergan (September 1, 1920 – October 24, 1943) was the daughter of Lucille Wolfe and William Burton, grandson of Emanuel Bernheimer, founder of the (formerly Constanz Brewery) Lion Brewery empire and of the United States Brewers' Association, who was murdered by Royal Canadian Air Force pilot Wayne Lonergan (January 14, 1918 – January 2, 1986) on October 24, 1943, who then fled back to Toronto and was arrested and extradited back to New York City for trial and sentencing. He was sentenced to 35 years to life in prison after a highly media sensationalised trial, deported back to Canada after serving only 22 years and later died of throat cancer on January 2, 1986, in Toronto. The marriage was believed to be a front for an intimate relationship between Patricia's father William Burton and Wayne Lonergan, regarding strong belief that Wayne lived as a gay man.

== Background ==
=== Wayne Lonergan ===
Wayne was born in Toronto on January 14, 1918 (died January 2, 1986), to mentally unstable parents; his mother died in a mental institution and his father died when Wayne was in his teens with a brother and sister. Wayne lived his 20s and 30s in Bathurst and Bloor. He attended Catholic and public schools, dropped out at age 16. In his teens, he had several run-ins with police, was arrested for petty crimes, and spent time at the Langstaff Jail Farm in Richmond Hill, and attended a business college and once worked as a lifeguard at the Simcoe Beach Park. A Toronto Police report reveals that Wayne bragged that he "made easy money through male perverts".

=== Patricia Lonergan ===
Patricia Hartley Burton Bernheimer Lonergan born on September 1, 1921, in Elberon, New Jersey, and was murdered on October 24, 1943, in New York City by separated husband Wayne.

=== William Burton ===
William Oliver Burton, born in October 1896 to Max Bernheimer Burton and Stella Bernheimer Housman (later remarried to Frederick Housman) with a brother, whose German-Jewish grandfather Emanuel Burnheimer (later anglicising his surname to Burton) immigrated from Baden-Württemberg in 1844 and started the Constanz Brewery in New York with August Schmid, who Lucille had divorced him on grounds of desertion over "a young male correspondent" in 1925, met Wayne Lonergan working as a bus dispatcher for Greyhound Bus Lines at the 1939 New York World's Fair, attracted to Wayne's personality, William started to patronise him in exchange for his companionship, and facilitated Wayne's marriage to Patricia, and William died in October 1940.

=== Lucille ===
Lucille Hartwig Wolfe, the daughter of Hartwig Cohen/Charles Wolfe and Clara Lea Wolfe, born on August 7, 1893, in Chicago, Illinois, and died on November 27, 1966, in New York City, with brothers Saling Henry Wolfe, Robert Lee Wolfe, Richard Claude Wolfe and sister Helen Louise Worden, with paternal grandparents; Sailing L. Wolfe and Sarah Wolfe and maternal grandparents; Simon Yatter and Emma Etta Yatter.

== Marriage ==
Wayne married Patricia (against her mother's wishes) in Las Vegas, in July 1941, a year before their son William "Billy" Wayne Lonergan was born on July 1, 1942. Both worked as escorts in the city, frequenting the Stork Club and El Morocco social clubs with Lonergan entertaining playboys. One of Patricia's clients was Italian interior designer, Mario Gabelline. Ordered to report for duty in WWII, Wayne was turned down for enlistment in the U.S. Armed Forces due to being classified "4-F", (unacceptable due to his homosexuality). Patricia and Wayne initially lived together in an apartment at 983 Park Avenue and fought frequently but separated in summer of 1943. Patricia left him to live at 313 East 51st Street in Turtle Bay-Beekman Place, taking Billy with her and cutting him out of her will.

=== Murder ===
Wayne worked as a photographer's assistant before deciding to return to Toronto and enlisted in the Royal Canadian Air Force. On October 22, 1943, Wayne left Toronto to return to New York to see his son and escorted Jean Murphy Jaburg for dinner and a play, leaving her at 3 am, then attended gay clubs, engaging in sexual intercourse with a United States Army soldier Maurice Worcester and with Patricia also entertaining clients similarly, they both arrived at the residence at 7 am and then engaged in intercourse, with Patricia biting Wayne (rumored to be his penis) and then he grabbed a candelabra to beat and strangle her to death. Patricia scratched him hard in the struggle. Wayne cut up his bloody uniform and threw it into a river and fled back to Toronto.

=== Arrest and investigation ===
Two days later Patricia's nude body was discovered in her bedroom by her mother, Lucille and son's nanny Elizabeth Black. NYPD then contacted Wayne's commanding officer and discovered that he was on leave. Wayne attempted to refuge by boarding with Sidney Capel Dixon, a program director at the CBC and a Lonergan family friend at Belvidere Manor at 342 Bloor Street West. Toronto Police Det. Sgt. Arthur Harris and Alex Deans acting on an NYPD telegraph arrived at the boardhouse to question Wayne, with Wayne claiming that the scratches were from getting robbed of his uniform and Wayne was detained, and on orders from NYPD, Wayne was prevented from contacting his lawyer and childhood friend, Michael Doyle. Wayne was interrogated for 84 hours and revealed that the murder happened after a quarrel over their lack of sexual interest in each other and "mutual boredom". NYPD detectives William Prendergast and Nicholas Looram rode a train up to Toronto to investigate, and although they could prove that Lonergan had been at the scene, they could not prove he was the perpetrator in the murder.

=== Trial ===
Lonergan was extradited back to New York to stand trial in March 1944 and caused a media frenzy due to an early news leak. In the courtroom, although police could immediately identify Wayne as being a murderer but could not prove it, but with the press, Lonergan was immediately branded a murderer. Assistant District Attorney Jacob Grumet testified that Lonergan confessed to his homosexual inclination before and after the marriage, with Lonergan and defence lawyers repudiating an unsigned confession. Despite the early news leak, Judge James Garrett barred all spectators from the courtroom except reporting journalist. On March 31, 1944, Lonergan was convicted of second degree murder as opposed to first degree murder, sparing him from a possible death sentence. On April 17, 1944, Lonergan was sentenced to 35 years to life in prison.

=== Epilogue ===
In prison, Wayne attempted to gain entitlement of the brewery fortune but was denied on the basis that he was "civilly dead". In 1963, Wayne sought a new trial based on the forced confession but this was denied; instead, he was paroled two years later, released on December 2, 1965, having only served 22 years. He was deported back to Canada and started a new relationship with Canadian actress Barbara Hamilton He died of throat cancer in Toronto on January 2, 1986, with reports that he spent his last years as Barbara Hamilton's companion. Billy was raised believing that he was an orphan under a new given name and inherited the brewery fortune in 1954. According to Canadian author Allan Levine; "Over the years, the story of the murder, with the requisite number of theories about Lonergan's sexual identity, has been told and retold in countless tabloid newspapers and magazines and remains a favourite topic of crime and mystery bloggers."

== Pop culture legacy ==
The media sensation was the inspiration for a 1946 Kenneth Fearing novel: The Big Clock published abridged in The American Magazine as The Judas Picture. It was later adapted into three films: The Big Clock (1948), Police Python 357 (1976) and No Way Out (1987).

== Inheritance ==
The art collection of William Burton, due to his Jewish status, was seized by the Nazis in France during the second World War. Genealogists as late as 2022 were looking for the artworks.
