= Harold Vermilyea =

American actor

- Born: October 10, 1889; New York City, New York, U.S.
- Died: January 8, 1958 (aged 68); New York City, New York, U.S.
- Occupation: Actor
- Years active: 1914–1957

Harold Vermilyea (October 10, 1889 – January 7, 1958) was an American actor who had a long and prolific career on Broadway, performing in 32 plays over the course of his career. He made notable appearances in several films of the post-war era, particularly film noirs, and ended his career moving into television.

== Life and career ==
Vermilyea was born October 10, 1889, in Manhattan. He made his first stage appearance in 1914 in "The Lion and the Mouse." Subsequent appearances included "It Pays to Advertise" (1914-1915) and a revival of "Get-Rich-Quick Wallingford" (1917), after which he served with the Army Ambulance Service in France during the First World War.

After WWI came to a close, Vermilyea returned to the Broadway stage and performed in twenty-nine further plays. These were: "A Tailor-Made Man" (1917-1918), "Hobohemia" (1919), "Pagans" (1921), "Captain Applejack" (1921-1922), "The Alarm Clock" (1923-1924), "The Lady Killer" (1924), "The Haunted House" (1924), "The Youngest" (1924-1925), "The Enemy" (1925-1926), "Loose Ankles" (1926-1927), "Los Angeles" (1927-1928), "Killers" (1928), "Anna" (1928), "A Man With Red Hair" (1928), "Midnight" (1930-1931), "We Are No Longer Children" (1932), "Bad Manners" (1933), "The Pure in Heart" (1934), "Boy Meets Girl" (1935-1937), "Fulton of Oak Falls" (1937), "Madame Bovary" (1937), "If I Were You" (1938), "Gloriana" (1938), "Gabrielle" (1941), "Sun-Up" (presumably a revival of the Lula Vollmer play; date unknown), "The Acquittal" (presumably a revival of the Rita Weiman play; date unknown), "Jacobowsky and the Colonel" (1944-1945), "Deep Are the Roots" (1945-1946), and "Deadfall" (1955).

Vermilyea had substantial roles in 1930s radio, supporting Maude Adams in a series and playing a leading role on the Rudy Vallée Show. During the World War II years, he served as Director of the American Theatre Wing's Victory Players.

Vermilyea devoted his time in the post-war era to motion pictures and then to television. TV programs on which he appeared included Lux Video Theatre.

== Death ==
Vermilyea died of an apparent heart attack at his apartment in Manhattan on January 8, 1958.

== Selected filmography ==
=== Film ===
- The Jungle (1914) - Undetermined
- Pride and the Devil (1917) - Undetermined
- The Law That Failed (1917) - Jack Thorpe
- O.S.S. (1946) - Amadeus Brink
- Gentleman's Agreement (1947) - Lou Jordan
- The Miracle of the Bells (1948) - Orloff
- The Big Clock (1948) - Don Klausmeyer
- The Sainted Sisters (1948) - Lederer
- The Emperor Waltz (1948) - Chamberlain
- Beyond Glory (1948) - Raymond Denmore, Sr.
- Sorry, Wrong Number (1948) - Waldo Evans
- California's Golden Beginning [short] (1948)
- Alias Nick Beal (1949) - Chief Justice (uncredited)
- Manhandled (1949) - Dr. Redman
- Chicago Deadline (1949) - Jack Anstruder
- Edge of Doom (1950) - Father Kirkman
- Born to Be Bad (1950) - John Caine
- Katie Did It (1950) - Merill T. Grumby
- Finders Keepers (1952) - Mr. Fitzpatrick

=== Television ===
- Danger
- Man Against Crime
- Studio One
- The Philco Playhouse
