= The Big Clock =

Novel by Kenneth Fearing

- First edition (1946)
- Author: Kenneth Fearing
- Cover artist: Roger
- Language: English
- Genre: Thriller
- Published: 1946
- Publisher: Harcourt, Brace and Company
- Publication place: United States
- Media type: Print (Hardcover)

The Big Clock is a 1946 novel by Kenneth Fearing. Published by Harcourt Brace, the thriller was Fearing's fourth novel, following three for Random House (The Hospital, Dagger of the Mind, Clark Gifford's Body) and five collections of poetry. The story, which first appeared in abridged form in The American Magazine (October 1946) as "The Judas Picture", was adapted for three films: The Big Clock (1948) starring Ray Milland, Police Python 357 (1976) starring Yves Montand, and No Way Out (1987) starring Kevin Costner.

== Plot ==
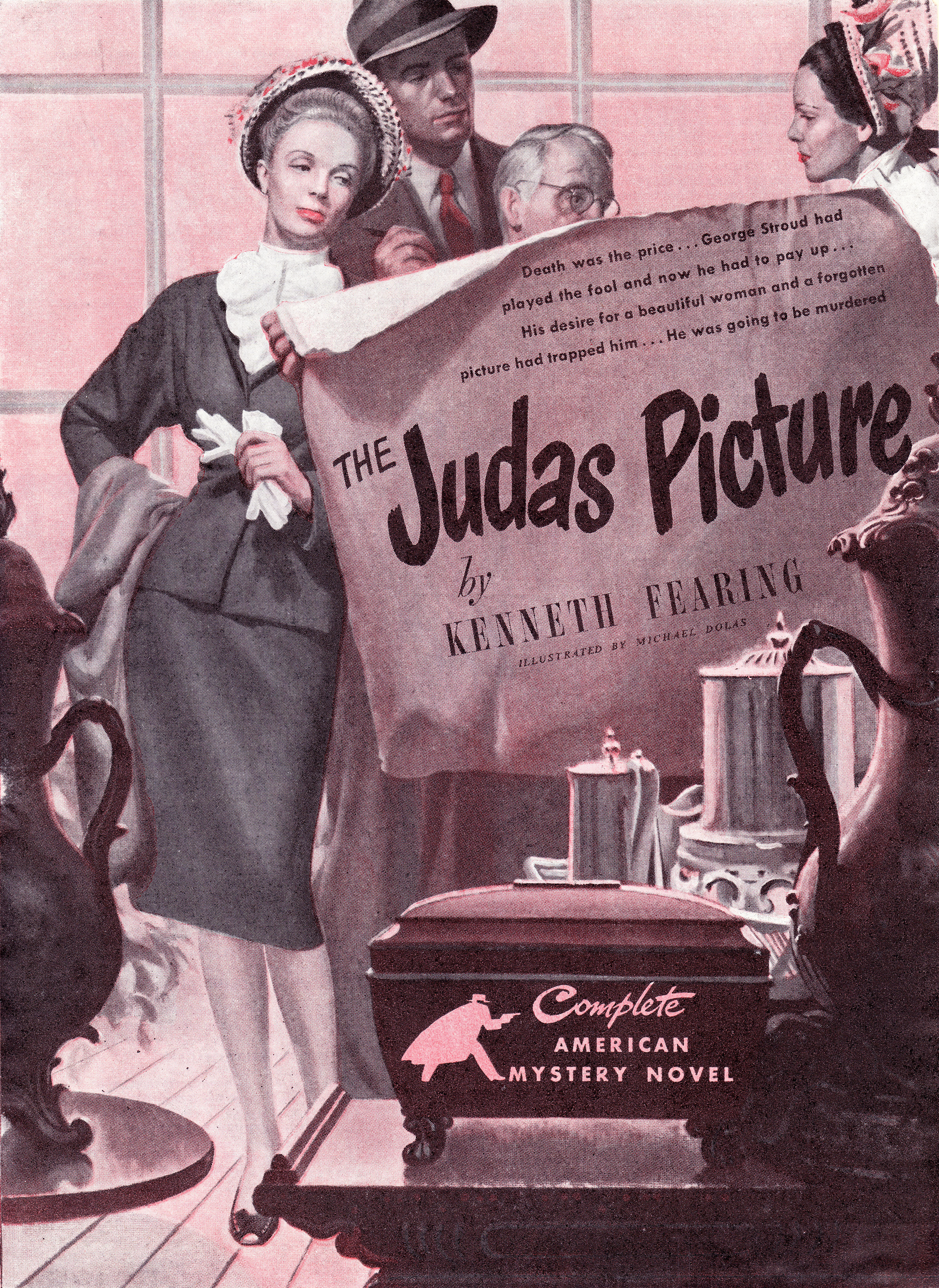
The Big Clock in The American Magazine, with illustrations by Michael Dolas

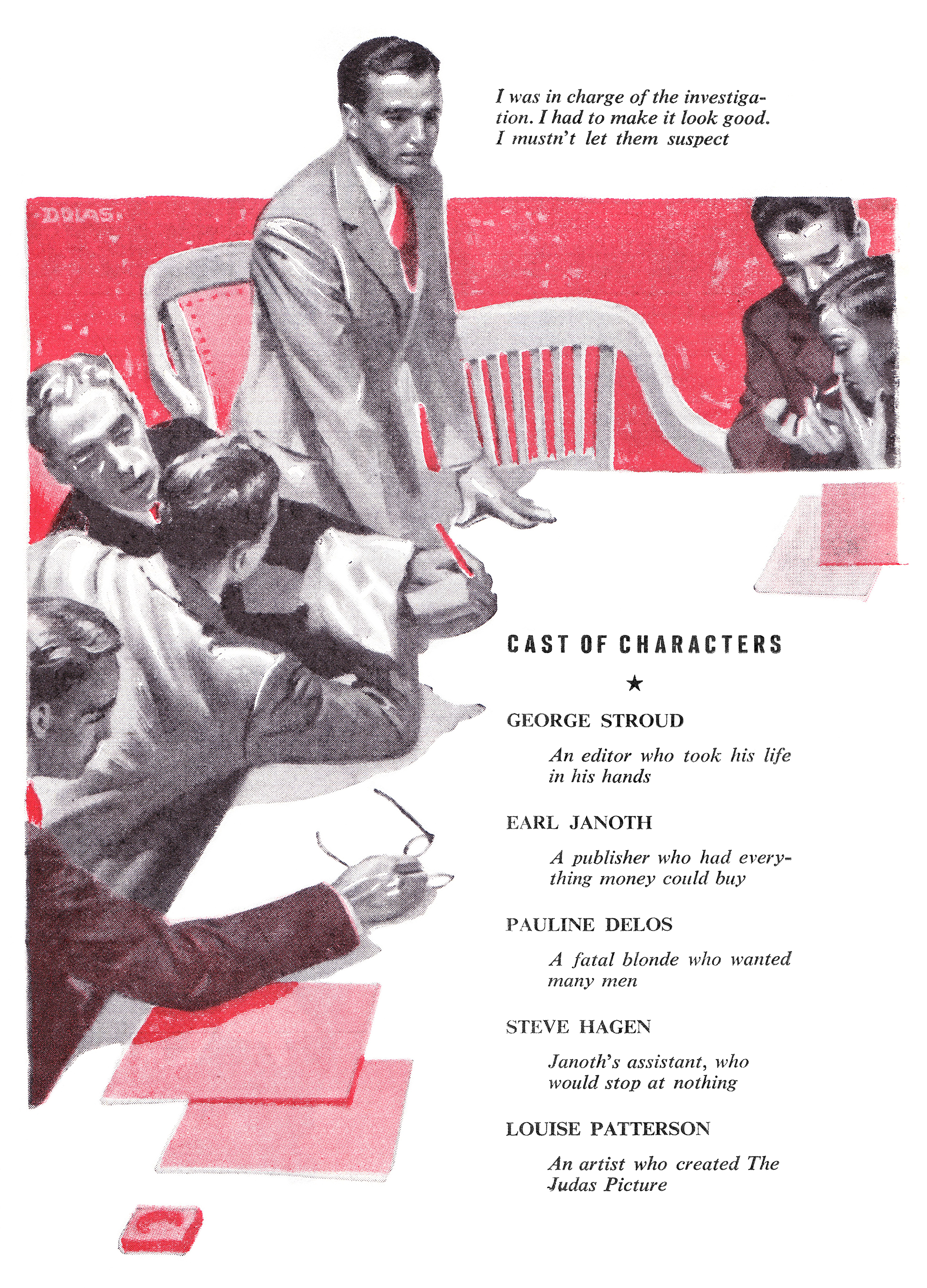
Cast of characters.

The novel's innovative structure is presented from the point-of-view of seven different characters. Each of the 19 chapters adopts the perspective of a single character. The first five chapters are told by George Stroud, who works for a New York magazine publisher not unlike Time-Life.

Stroud is a borderline alcoholic and serial adulterer. His latest affair is with Pauline, who is also the girlfriend of his boss, Earl Janoth. After a weekend together in upstate New York, George and Pauline spend a leisurely evening in Manhattan—eating dinner, bar-hopping, and browsing antique stores. George is a collector of the artist Louise Patterson and finds one of her works in shabby condition in an antique store. He outbids another customer for it. (The other customer turns out to be Patterson herself.) Later, George leaves Pauline at a corner near her Manhattan apartment. He watches her approach the entrance and sees Earl emerge from a limousine and enter the building with her. Earl sees George observing him, but, crucially, he cannot make him out in the shadows.

In Pauline's apartment, she and Earl have a violent argument in which he accuses her of being a cheat and a lesbian. In reply, she suggests that he and his close associate, Steve Hagen, are a gay couple. This enrages Earl and he bludgeons her to death with a crystal decanter. In a panic, he goes to Steve's apartment for assistance. Steve immediately begins planning a coverup and tells Earl he must be prepared to have the man who witnessed him enter the building killed. Earl reluctantly agrees.

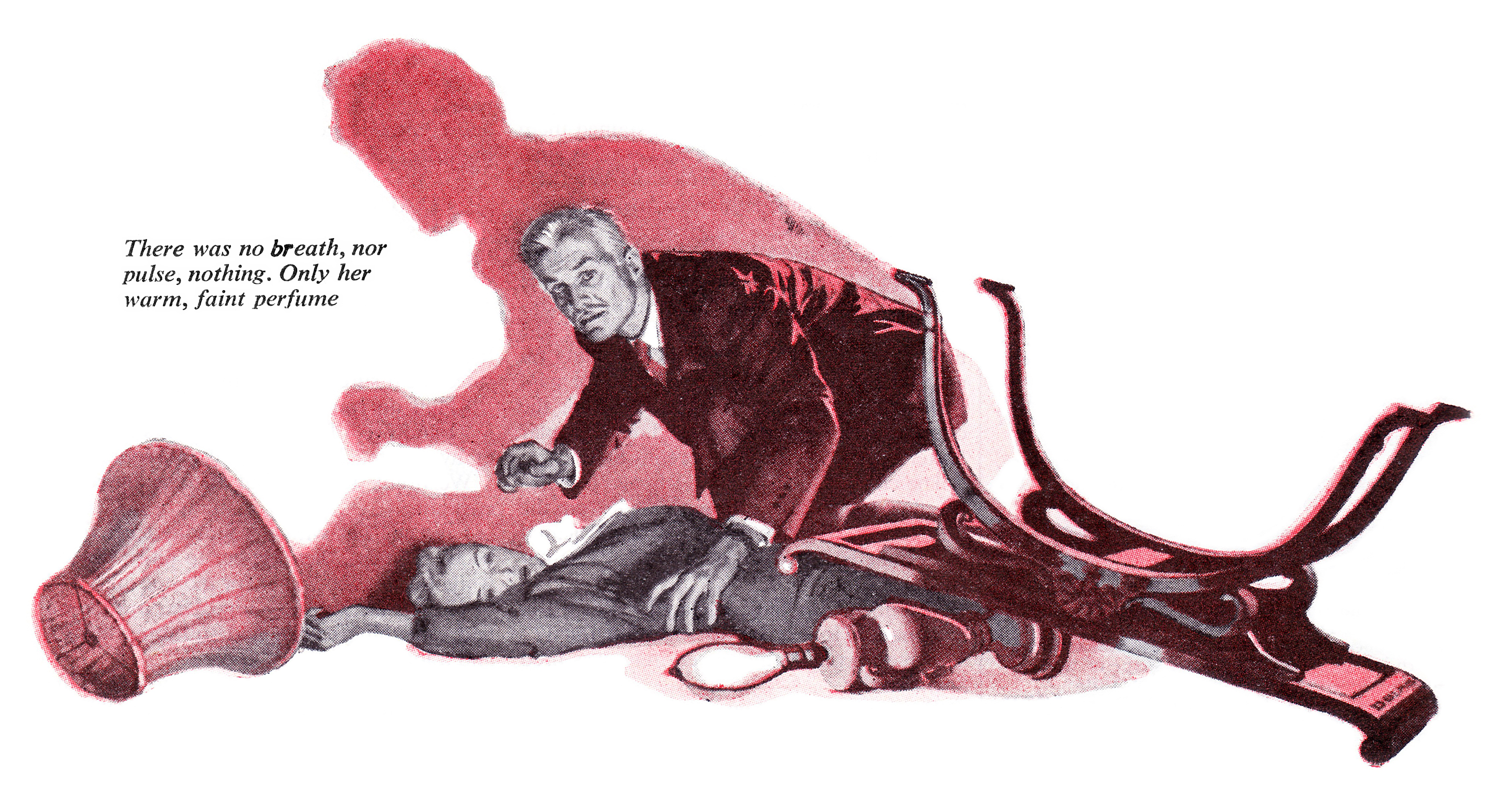
Magazine illustration of Pauline's murder by Earl.

Earl and Steve employ all of the resources of the publishing firm to find the mysterious witness—not realizing that he is right under their noses. They put George in charge of the investigation, as he is their sharpest editor. George sets the investigation in motion, but craftily subverts its chance for success.

Despite the roadblocks George puts in the way of the investigation identifying him as the witness, he comes closer and closer to being found. Eventually, witnesses are brought to the publishing house's building, because it is said that the sought-after individual (name still unknown) is inside. The building is being searched floor-by-floor and it appears inevitable that Stroud will be caught, but Earl snaps under the pressure and surrenders his company to an unfavorable merger. His leaving the company suddenly makes the manhunt moot and it is quickly terminated, without the witnesses seeing George.

The story ends with George meeting Louise in a quirky bar, where they discuss the dispensation of her works. As George leaves to meet his wife for dinner, he sees a newspaper with the headline, "EARL JANOTH, OUSTED PUBLISHER, PLUNGES TO DEATH."

== Development history ==
Fearing based the novel on the October 1943 murder of New York brewery heiress Patricia Burton Bernheimer Lonergan and Sam Fuller's 1944 thriller, The Dark Page. A combination of these two suggested a plot thread to Fearing, and he began writing The Big Clock during August 1944, continuing to work on the manuscript for over a year. He married artist Nan Lurie in 1945, and much of the novel was written in her loft on East 10th Street in New York City. The manuscript was completed by October 1945, and it was published by Harcourt Brace a year later.

In his introduction to Kenneth Fearing: Complete Poems (1994), Robert M. Ryley described the events of publication and the aftermath:

Published in the fall of 1946, The Big Clock made Fearing temporarily rich. Altogether he took in about $60,000 (roughly $360,000 in 1992 dollars): about $10,000 in royalties and from the sale of republication rights (including a condensation in The American Magazine), and $50,000 from the sale of film rights to Paramount. In 1947, Nan won $2,000 in an art competition, a sum they dismissed as negligible but that only two years earlier would have seemed a fortune. But Fearing's successes always contained the germ of disaster. Overestimating his business acumen, he had negotiated his own contract with Paramount, permanently and irrevocably signing away his film rights, and relinquishing his television rights till 1953, by which time, he discovered to his rage and frustration, Paramount was showing late-night reruns and had thus cornered the market. A more immediate problem was alcohol. He told his friend Alice Neel (the model for Louise Patterson, the eccentric painter in The Big Clock) that since he could now afford to start drinking in the morning, he was having trouble getting any work done. On one occasion he almost died from a combination of scotch and phenobarbital, and in 1952 he was so shaken by his doctor's warnings about the condition of his liver that he went on the wagon. For Nan, who for years had been trying to get him to stop drinking, this should have been a cause for rejoicing, but she discovered that without alcohol he was no longer "playful" and "romantic" and that she was no longer interested in the marriage.

== Publication history ==
- 1946, The American Magazine, October 1946, abridged as "The Judas Picture"
- 1946, New York: Harcourt, Brace and Company, hardcover
- 1947, Armed Services Edition
- 1976, New York and London: Garland Publishing, Inc. (Fifty Classics of Crime Fiction 1900–1950), hardcover reprint of 1946 edition with preface by Jacques Barzun and Wendell Hertig Taylor
- 2002, London: Orion Publishing Group (Crime Masterworks), paperback, ISBN 0-7528-5134-9
- 2006, New York: New York Review Books Classics, paperback, introduction by Nicholas Christopher, ISBN 978-1-59017-181-3

== Literary significance and reception ==
In A Catalogue of Crime (1971), a reference guide to detective fiction, Jacques Barzun and Wendell Hertig Taylor describe The Big Clock as "a truly brilliant story, laid in a large mass-communications organization … Tone and talk are sharp and often bitter—the whole business is a tour de force worthy of the highest praise."

Barzun and Taylor selected The Big Clock for their hardcover-reprint series, Fifty Classics of Crime Fiction 1900–1950. "As if showing a man caught in the machinery were not enough, Fearing has multiplied the horrors by adding the secret burden of guilt, the fear of death by execution, and the strain of trying to find a way out of damning circumstances", they wrote in the preface:

The result is a story which just misses being a nightmare too rational to be endured. What gives the reader a chance to breathe and even smile is the admixture of some warm human touches and some excellent unforced humor. By a further display of narrative skill, the story is presented by six persons in nineteen varied episodes, leading to a sufficiently grim smash ending, yet without palpable interruption of the relentless "clock". And when all is over the reader-participant in this drama of the big city and the big outfit will reflect with surprise that the tour de force which so gripped him was a mystery without a mystery.

The Big Clock is one of the novels chosen by author Kevin Johnson to represent the literary origins of film noir in his 2007 book, The Dark Page: Books That Inspired American Film Noir, 1940–1949.

Alan M. Wald, a historian of the American Left, summarizes the "frightening and fragmented hollowness" that Fearing saw in post-war US society and depicted in The Big Clock:

The menacing ambience of dislocation that permeates The Big Clock is structurally and symbolically rendered as industrial capitalism, a socioeconomic order in which the avenues of communication, especially publishing and the airwaves, are evolving into a science of planned manipulation designed to ensure profitability. Well-paid deceivers, together with the naively deceived, are imprisoned as cogs in the apparatus of private enterprise's modern institutions. ... The genius of The Big Clock is its previsioning of the manifold mythological dimensions of a "Consumer's Republic" that would typify the era.

== Adaptations ==
=== Film ===
John Farrow directed The Big Clock (1948), screenwriter Jonathan Latimer's adaptation of the novel. The film stars Ray Milland, Charles Laughton, Rita Johnson, George Macready and Maureen O'Sullivan.

Alain Corneau's Police Python 357 (1976) is a French adaptation of The Big Clock in which the main characters are policemen in Orléans, France.

Directed by Roger Donaldson, No Way Out (1987) stars Kevin Costner, Gene Hackman, and Sean Young. Robert Garland's adaptation updates events to the American political world in Washington, D.C., during the Cold War.

=== Radio ===
In October 1973 The Big Clock was also dramatized on radio as Desperate Witness, an episode of Mutual's The Zero Hour, hosted by Rod Serling.
