= Manhandled (1949 film) =

1949 film by Lewis R. Foster

- Theatrical release poster
- Directed by: Lewis R. Foster
- Screenplay by: Whitman Chambers; Lewis R. Foster
- Based on: the novel The Man Who Stole A Dream by L. S. Goldsmith
- Produced by: William H. Pine; William C. Thomas
- Starring: Dorothy Lamour; Sterling Hayden; Dan Duryea
- Cinematography: Ernest Laszlo
- Edited by: Howard A. Smith
- Music by: Darrell Calker
- Production company: Pine-Thomas Productions
- Distributed by: Paramount Pictures
- Release date: May 12, 1949 (Providence)
- Running time: 96 minutes
- Country: United States
- Language: English

Manhandled is a 1949 American film noir crime film directed by Lewis R. Foster and starring Dorothy Lamour, Sterling Hayden and Dan Duryea. It is based on the 1945 novel The Man Who Stole a Dream by L. S. Goldsmith.

== Plot ==
Struggling writer Alton Bennet explains to psychiatrist Dr. Redman how he has nightmares about murdering his wealthy wife, Ruth, who owns very valuable jewels.

Redman's private secretary, Merl Kramer, casually mentions Bennet's problems to her boyfriend, a private eye, Karl Benson. Merl also mentions that Ruth Bennet is scheduled to drop into Dr. Redman's office that evening for a special session concerning her husband. Benson gets ideas about the jewels, steals Merl's keys and gets duplicates made. Later, he waits outside Redman's office until Ruth arrives, then writes down the Bennets' address from information posted in the car.

Benson is next seen showing his pawnbroker acquaintance, Charlie, jewels and asking him to value them. Charlie, informed by overhearing police radio, mentions there is a "murder rap hanging over this junk" and pays out only for a couple of small pieces. He advises Benson to get rid of the rest. Benson runs into Merl and asks her to deposit the money into her bank account, suggesting he has earned it from a recent job and does not want to be tempted to spend it all. He hides the jewels in the water cooler in his office/apartment.

Ruth Bennet is found murdered, precisely in the manner her husband has been dreaming. Along with Detective Dawson, Insurance Investigator Joe Cooper is on the case. While interviewing Redman, it is revealed that the transcripts concerning Bennet's conversations about his nightmare are missing. Redman is seen to have a bandaged bump on his head, which he claims happened when he slipped the previous evening while walking in the park.

It comes to light that Merl's references for her job with Redman were forged, which raises Dawson's suspicions about whether the woman is an upstanding person. He and Cooper question her and she tells them that she got the references and the job with Redman through a friend, Karl Benson.

Benson plays down his relationship with Merl and suggests he can help Dawson and Cooper with the Bennet case, for a share of the eventual insurance payout. He then goes to talk with Merl, and secretly plants one of the dead woman's rings under her sofa cushion. When Merl finds it, she pawns it for the few dollars she needs to finish paying for a new coat. She tells Cooper, when he asks her about it – the pawnbroker had immediately recognized the ring and had phoned police – that she had no idea that it could be Ruth Bennet's property.

Benson works to frame Merl for the murder and the theft; he shows Dawson and Cooper her bankbook and insinuates the recent large deposit has to do with the stolen loot. In his office/apartment, Benson is then confronted by Redman who has realized it is Benson who has the jewels. Benson had stolen the transcript describing the murder scenario nightmare, and had gone to take the gems; when he arrived, he saw Redman leaving the Bennet apartment after killing Ruth. Benson knocked the man out, thereby giving him the bump on his head, and took the pieces from him.

Benson and Redman make an uneasy deal wherein Benson will ensure he "finds" the jewels in Merl's apartment, turn them in to Dawson and Cooper, and he and Redman can share the insurance payout. Benson then goes to the station where Merl is being interrogated. He denies any knowledge of the money in her bank account, then tells Dawson he would be glad to go check her apartment for him again, to see where she may have hidden things. While there, attempting to hide the stash to make it look like Merl did it, Redman shows up, demanding the items. Benson hands them over but, after the man leaves by the fire escape, Benson runs down to the street and, using Redman's own car, kills him.

After stowing the jewels inside Merl's chair, he phones Dawson to tell him he has found them. When Merl returns to her apartment, he tells her she is going down for the crime. They struggle and he knocks her out; he takes her to the roof, intending to throw her off and make it appear like suicide. The police, having arrived as per Benson's call, hear her screams; Cooper and Dawson rescue her. Back in her apartment, Benson learns that Charlie has been taken in for possession of the stolen property; the private eye is further caught in his web of lies and is arrested.

== Cast ==
- Dorothy Lamour as Merl Kramer
- Sterling Hayden as Joe Cooper
- Dan Duryea as Karl Benson
- Irene Hervey as Ruth, Mrs. Alton Bennet
- Phillip Reed as Guy Bayard
- Harold Vermilyea as Dr. Redman
- Alan Napier as Alton Bennet
- Art Smith as Detective Lt. Bill Dawson
- Irving Bacon as Sgt. Fayle
- Ian Wolfe as Charlie, a Fence
- Maidie Norman as Christine, Bennet's Maid
- James Edwards as Henry, Bennet's Butler
- Ray Hyke as Phil Wilson, Detective
- Morgan Farley as Doc, Police Lab Man
- Keye Luke as Chinese Laundry Owner
- George Humbert as Italian Restaurant Owner

== Production ==
Its working title were The Man Who Stole a Dream and The Betrayal.

== Release ==
The film opened at the Strand in Providence, Rhode Island on May 12, 1949. It was paired with Take My Life and grossed $10,000 in its opening week. The following week it opened in Boston and Buffalo and on May 25, 1949, opened at the Paramount Theatre in New York City where it grossed $56,000 in its first week.

== Reception ==
Audiences and critics found the plot too confusing, and the film was not popular on its release. Lisa Mateas of Turner Classic Movies said that "contemporary audiences ... will find that Manhandled does not disappoint".

The film was described by the producer as "somewhat troublesome" at the box office.
