= Irene Krugman =

American sculptor

- Born: 1925; New York City
- Died: April 15, 1982 (aged 56); Morristown, New Jersey
- Education: Kansas City Art Institute, New York University, The New School for Social Research
- Known for: Installation art

Irene Krugman (1925–15 April 1982) was an American artist, known for creating installations, using a limited number of simplified forms that are repeated on different scales.

Krugman was born in New York City. She studied at the Kansas City Art Institute, New York University, and the New School for Social Research with Yasuo Kuniyoshi. She exhibited widely, in group and solo shows, and her work is owned by the Newark Museum, the New Jersey State Museum, Michigan State University, University of Notre Dame, and Rowan University Art Gallery, among others.

Her work was praised in The New York Times by Grace Glueck, who noted that Krugman's installation at the City University of New York in 1977 consisted of a "mastaba-shape" and "mirror-lined boxes of unfinished wood that carry within themselves identical smaller structures reflected by the mirrors," which she called "an imaginative idea, imaginatively executed." In response to her solo exhibition at OK Harris Gallery in 1978, a reviewer in Arts Magazine characterized Krugman's work as "a model for our perception of the larger world which is also self-reflexive, limited, in other words, by our capacity to measure and know it."

Krugman and her husband, Leonard (1919-1989), lived in Morristown, New Jersey. Their son, Michael Krugman (1951–2016), was a practitioner of self-healing and developed the Sounder Sleep System, a treatment for people suffering from insomnia. Irene Krugman died of cancer, aged 56.
