= Anne Helioff =

American painter (1910–2001)

Anne Helioff Hirschberg (also known as Anna or Annie, December 29, 1910 – November 12, 2001) was an American painter and collage artist of English birth.

A native of Liverpool, Helioff studied at the Art Students League of New York and the Hans Hofmann School of Art in New York City; at the former her teachers included Yasuo Kuniyoshi, with whom she would apprentice and later work as a colleague at the Woodstock Art Association, and Homer Boss. Helioff, who was married to Benjamin Hirschberg, also served at the president of the Woodstock Art Association.

Helioff won numerous awards and honors throughout her career, and her work was featured in solo and group exhibitions both in the United States and abroad. A collection of her papers is held at the Archives of American Art of the Smithsonian Institution.
