= Sara Mazo Kuniyoshi =

American dancer and actress

- Born: Sara Mazo; July 4, 1910; New York
- Died: November 6, 2006 (aged 96)
- Occupations: Dancer, actress, museum professional
- Spouse: Yasuo Kuniyoshi

Sara Mazo Kuniyoshi (July 4, 1910 – November 6, 2006) was an American dancer and actress. She was married to Japanese-born artist Yasuo Kuniyoshi. Later in life she worked at the Museum of Modern Art, as assistant curator of museum collections.

== Early life ==
Sara Mazo was born in New York City. She began taking dance lessons as a schoolgirl, and continued with support from philanthropists Irene Lewisohn and Alice Lewisohn, sisters who took a special interest in theatre.

== Career ==
Mazo starred in a production of Mary Heaton Vorse's Strike in Provincetown in 1933. She was a member of the Sara Mildred Strauss Dancers in the 1930s, and with them appeared in two Broadway shows, Ziegfeld Follies (1934) and Calling All Stars (1934-1935). She left performing after she married in 1935. She wrote for some New York publications in the late 1930s. During and after World War II she worked at the Museum of Modern Art, in the Museum Collection department, until she retired in 1975.

Mazo outlived her artist husband by several decades, and was often interviewed about his life and art, or involved in exhibits of his work. In 1975 she was honored guest at an opening reception for Kuniyoshi's work at the Harry Ransom Center in Texas. In 1987, she donated a collection of his photographs to the Center for Creative Photography, University of Arizona. In the 1990s, she gave to the Children’s Museum of the Arts a collection of children's art created in Works Progress Administration classes in New York City during the 1930s. She gave an oral history interview to the Museum of Modern Art in 1993. In 2003, she was guest of honor at the Woodstock Beaux Arts Ball.

== Personal life ==
Sara Mazo married Japanese-born artist Yasuo Kuniyoshi in 1935. She was widowed when Kuniyoshi died in 1953, and she died in 2006, aged 94 years. The Yasuo Kuniyoshi Papers in the Archives of American Art include materials she collected and created.
