= Yasuo Kuniyoshi =

Japanese-American painter (1889–1953)

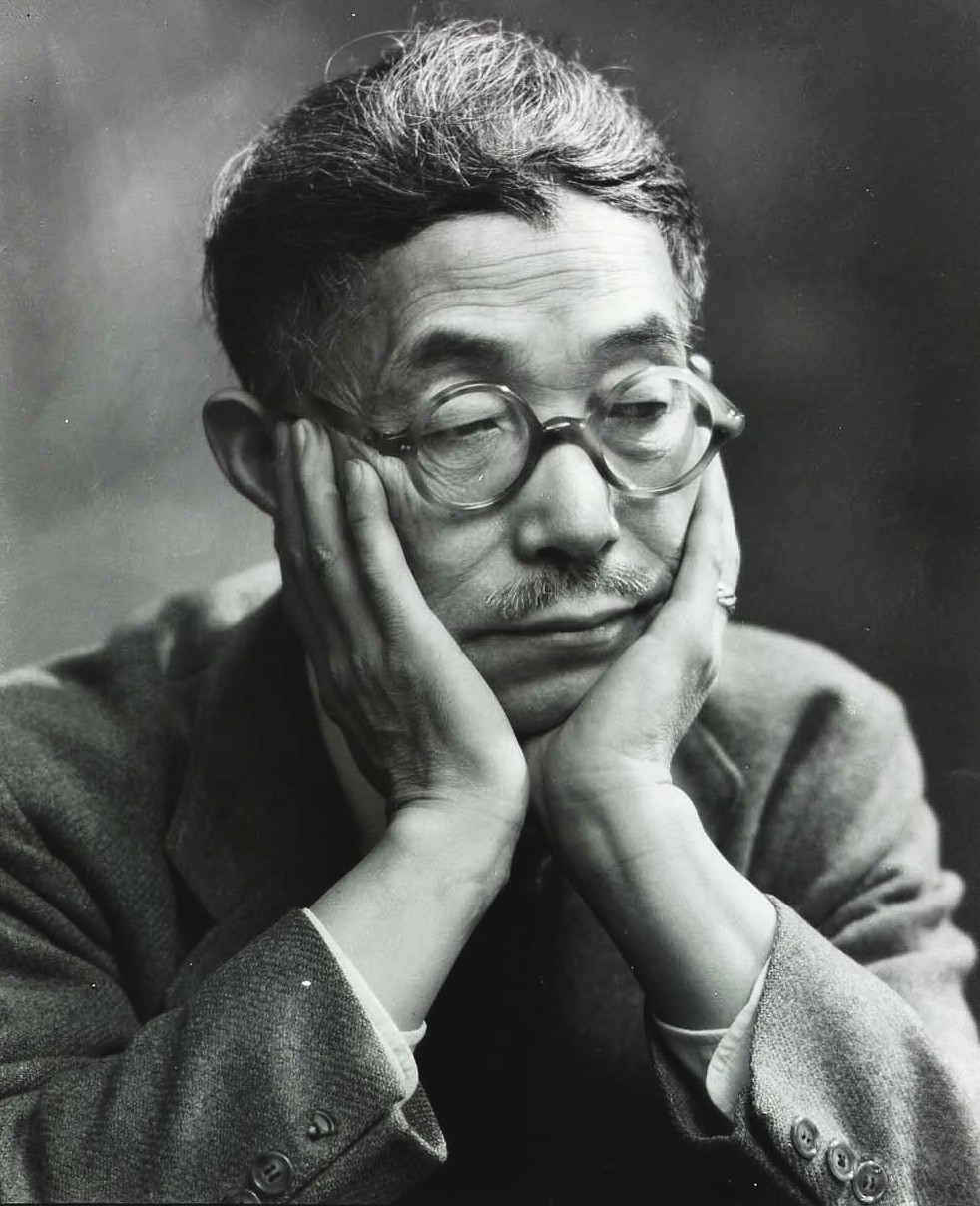
- Kuniyoshi from the Archives of American Art
- Born: September 1, 1889; Okayama, Japan
- Died: May 14, 1953 (aged 63); New York City, US
- Education: Los Angeles School of Art and Design, Art Students League of New York
- Known for: Painting, intaglio printmaking, lithography
- Spouses: Katherine Schmidt (div. 1932); Sara Mazo (m. 1935)
- Awards: Guggenheim Fellowship

Yasuo Kuniyoshi (国吉 康雄, Kuniyoshi Yasuo; September 1, 1889 – May 14, 1953) was a Japanese-American painter, photographer and printmaker.

== Early life ==
Kuniyoshi was born on September 1, 1889, in Okayama, Japan. He immigrated to the United States in 1906 at 17, choosing not to attend military school in Japan. Kuniyoshi originally intended to study English and return to Japan to work as a translator.

He spent some time in Seattle, before enrolling at the Los Angeles School of Art and Design. Kuniyoshi spent three years in Los Angeles, discovering his love for the arts. He then moved to New York City to pursue an art career. Kuniyoshi studied briefly at the National Academy and later at the Independent School of Art in New York City, and then studied under Kenneth Hayes Miller at the Art Students League of New York. He later taught at the Art Students League of New York in New York City and in Woodstock, New York. Nan Lurie was among his students, as was Irene Krugman and Faith Ringgold. Around 1930, the artist built a home and studio on Ohayo Mountain Road in Woodstock. He was an active member of the artistic community there for the rest of his life. One of his pupils from the League, Anne Helioff, would go on to work with him at Woodstock.

Kuniyoshi was awarded the Temple Gold Medal in 1934 from the Pennsylvania Academy of Fine Art. In 1935, Kuniyoshi was awarded the Guggenheim Fellowship. He was also an Honorary member of the National Institute of Arts and Letters and first president of Artists Equity Association, now known as New York Artists Equity Association.

In 1948, Kuniyoshi became the first living artist chosen to have a retrospective at the Whitney Museum of American Art. His work may also be found in the permanent collection of the National Gallery of Art in Washington, DC.

Kuniyoshi also exhibited at the 1952 Venice Biennale.

== Art ==
=== Printmaking ===
Kenneth Hayes Miller introduced Kuniyoshi to intaglio printmaking; he made approximately 45 such prints between 1916 and 1918. One of Kuniyoshi's more popular Intaglio prints is Bust of a Woman, Head Inclined to the Right, which can be found in the collections of both The Metropolitan Museum of Art and the Museum of Modern Art.

In 1922, Kuniyoshi learned about zinc plate lithography and adopted the technique. Kuniyoshi continued making lithographs throughout the remainder of his artistic career.

=== Painting ===
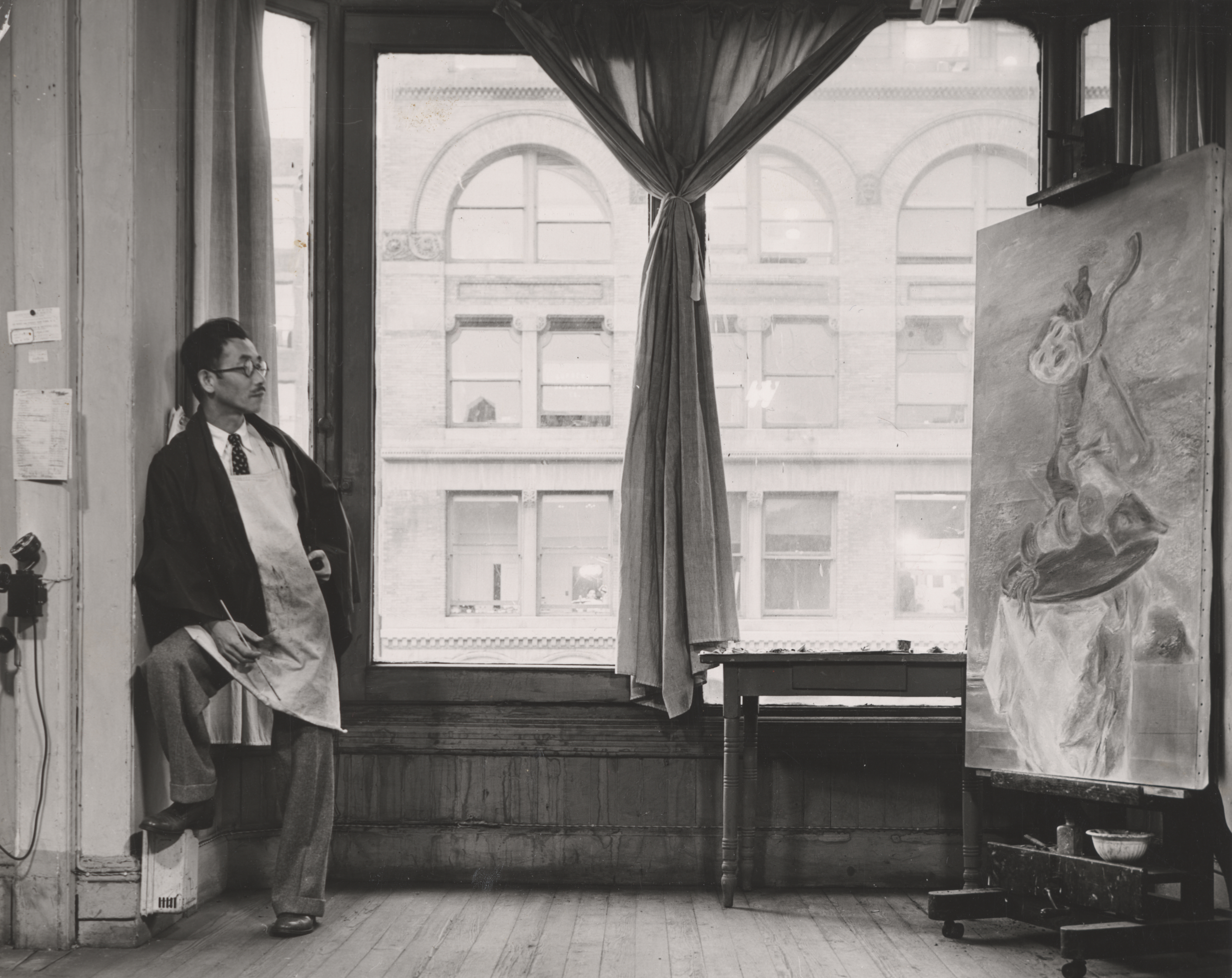
Kuniyoshi working on his painting Upside Down Table and Mask in his studio near Union Square at 30 East Fourteenth Street in New York City

Kuniyoshi was also known for his still-life paintings of common objects, and figurative subjects like female circus performers and nudes. Throughout Kuniyoshi's career he had frequent changes in his technique and subject matter. In the 1920s, Kuniyoshi painted images that were more angular, somewhat Cubist in style and with a tilted plane that allowed him to paint the most detail for each object in his paintings. Kuniyoshi's application of Cubism's angularity can be seen in his painting titled Little Joe with Cow (1923). In these early paintings, Kuniyoshi was painting from a combination of his memory and imagination, which is a Japanese mode of thinking about painting. Instead of painting from life, as in Western painting, traditional Japanese painters typically paint their ideal image of a particular subject. Kuniyoshi combined this with Western painting in the way he applies the bold colors in oil on canvas; in Japan, traditional painters use ink on either silk or rice paper. These early paintings are the precursors to his mature style that we see in the 1930s.

In 1925, Kuniyoshi painted his Circus Girl Resting, after a visit to Paris. He painted a provocative woman of larger proportions, similar to Strong Woman and Child. This painting was purchased and included in the Advancing American Art Exhibition by the US Department of State alongside other well-known modern artists such as Georgia O'Keeffe and Edward Hopper. Due to that era's aversion to modern art, the exhibition was closed down. Kuniyoshi's Circus Girl Resting received harsh criticism from President Harry Truman because of its exotic proportions, not because of its provocative nature.

In the 1930s Kuniyoshi switched from painting from memory to painting from life. This change occurred after his two trips to Europe in 1925 and 1928, where he was exposed to French modern art. In 1928, Goodrich notes, Kuniyoshi spent most of his time in Paris with his friend Jules Pascin, and it was on this later trip that Kuniyoshi realized that his art had grown stale. By switching to painting from life and incorporating perspective into his paintings, he was able to breathe life back into his images; the change in his style can be seen in Daily News (1935). In this painting it appears that the woman, who is seated in a chair, occupies space within the room depicted as opposed to appearing flat as in Little Joe with Cow. The sharp angles in the cow painting are gone in his painting of the woman, but the soft line work and bold use of colors are apparent in both images. His work was also part of the painting event in the art competition at the 1932 Summer Olympics.

Kuniyoshi's "Artificial Flowers and Other Things" appeared in the Whitney Museum's "Second Biennial Exhibition of Contemporary American Painting," which ran from November 27, 1934, to January 10, 1935, and included the work of one other Japanese-American artist, Hideo Noda.

Even in his images of women where they are full-bodied and seem to have a presence in the painting, such as the woman in Daily News, Kuniyoshi did not entirely throw out painting from memory. Goodrich points out that Kuniyoshi did not work with models for the entire painting process. Rather, the artist drew from the model in the early stages of a painting but eventually stopped using her after about a week or so, and then would continue on from his memory, making adjustments as he saw fit. This desire to paint the ideal perfection of a subject was favored in Japanese art, whereas in Western traditions the painting is typically informed by the real object throughout the entire painting process.

== Personal life ==
He married his first wife Katherine Schmidt, who in 1919 lost her American citizenship due to her relationship with Kuniyoshi who was ineligible for American citizenship. They divorced in 1932.

He later married Sara Mazo in 1935.

Although viewed as an immigrant, Kuniyoshi was very patriotic and identified himself as an American. He never received his citizenship due to harsh immigration laws. During World War II, he proclaimed his loyalty and patriotism as a propaganda artist for the United States. This included a number of anti-Japanese propaganda posters.

== Death ==
In the early 1950s, Kuniyoshi contracted cancer, and ended his art career with a series of black-and-white drawings using sumi-e ink. He died on May 14, 1953, aged 63 and is interred at the Woodstock Artists Cemetery in Woodstock, New York.

== Selected works ==
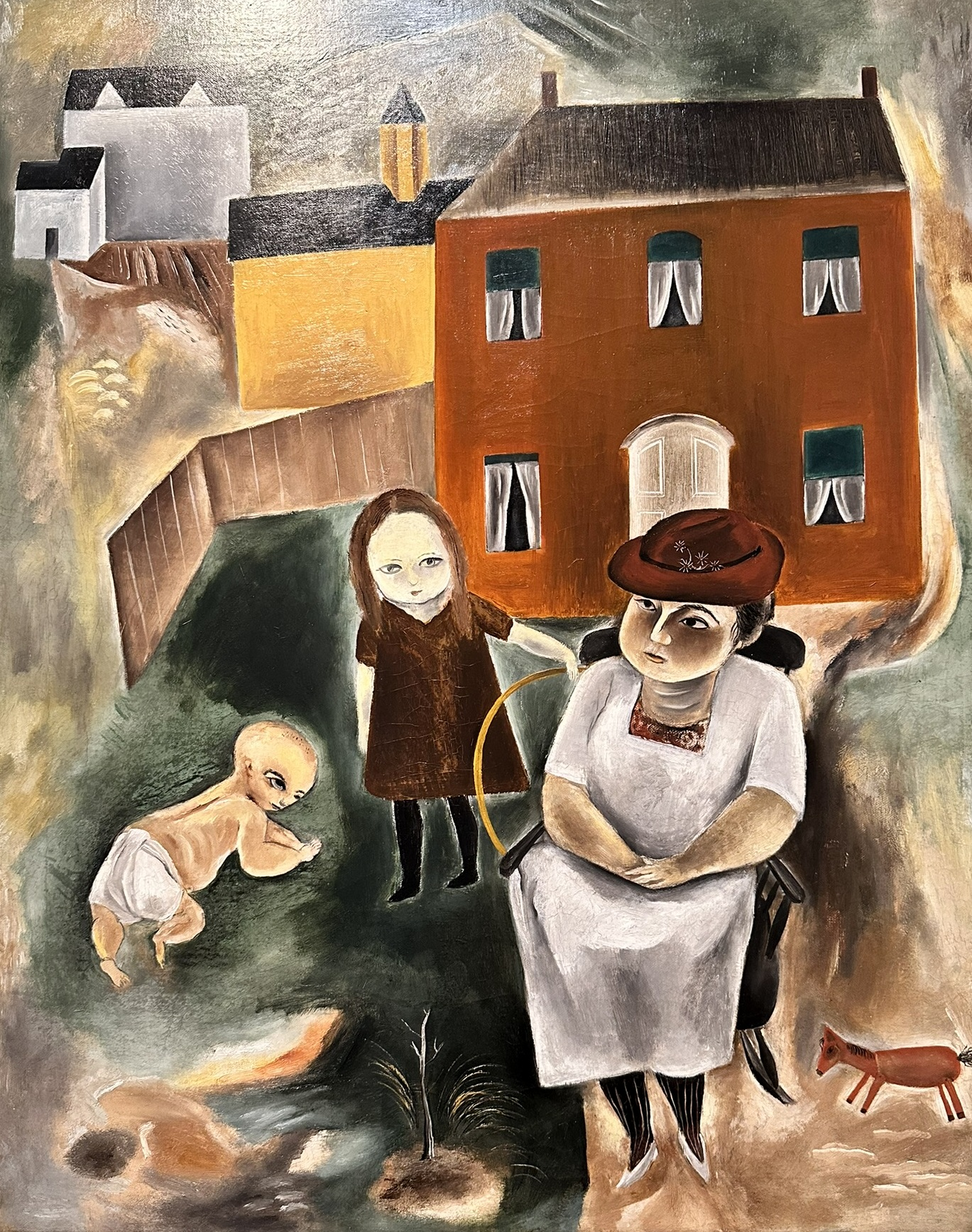
Maine Family (1922), The Phillips Collection

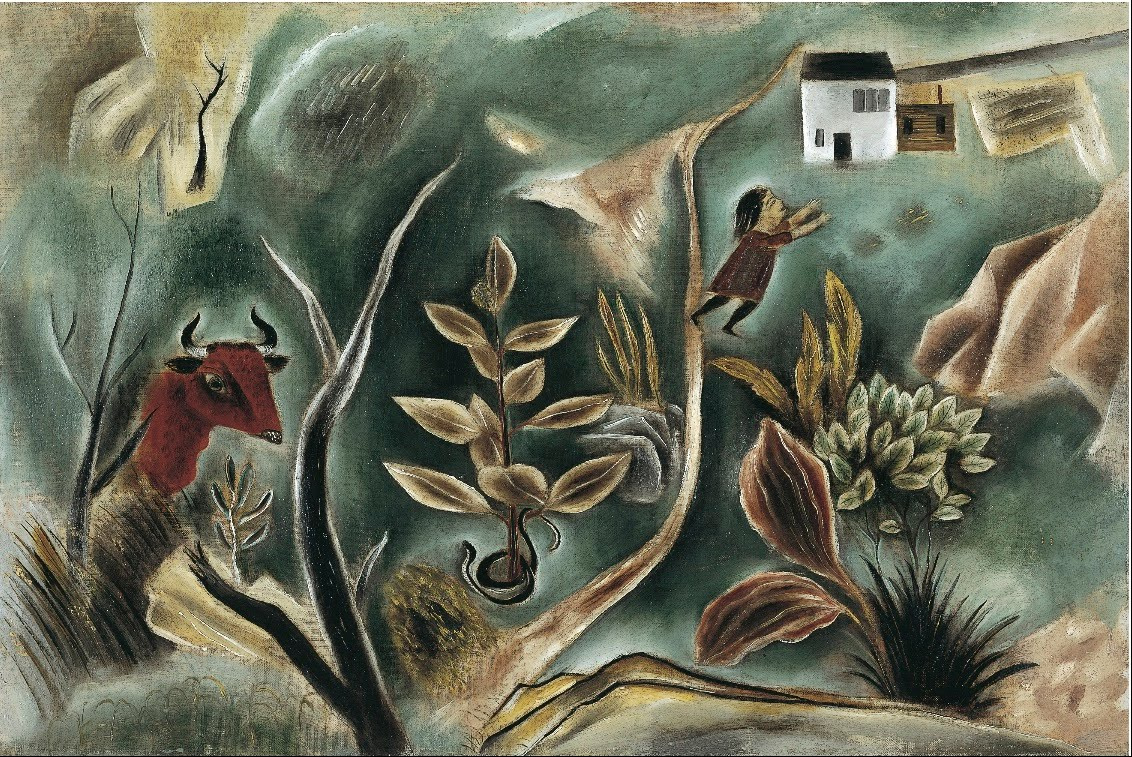
Dream (1922), Artizon Museum

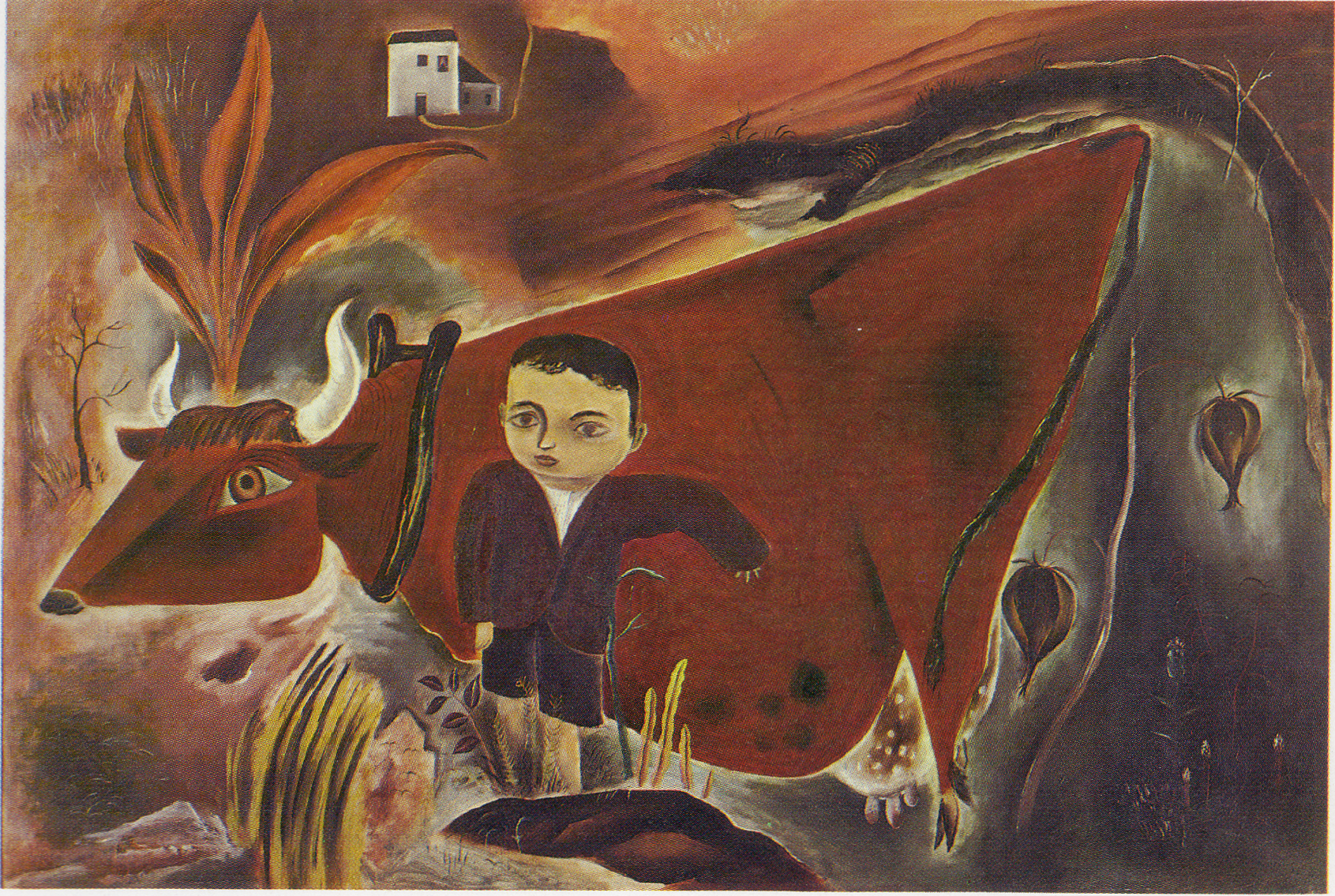
Little Joe with the Cow (1923)

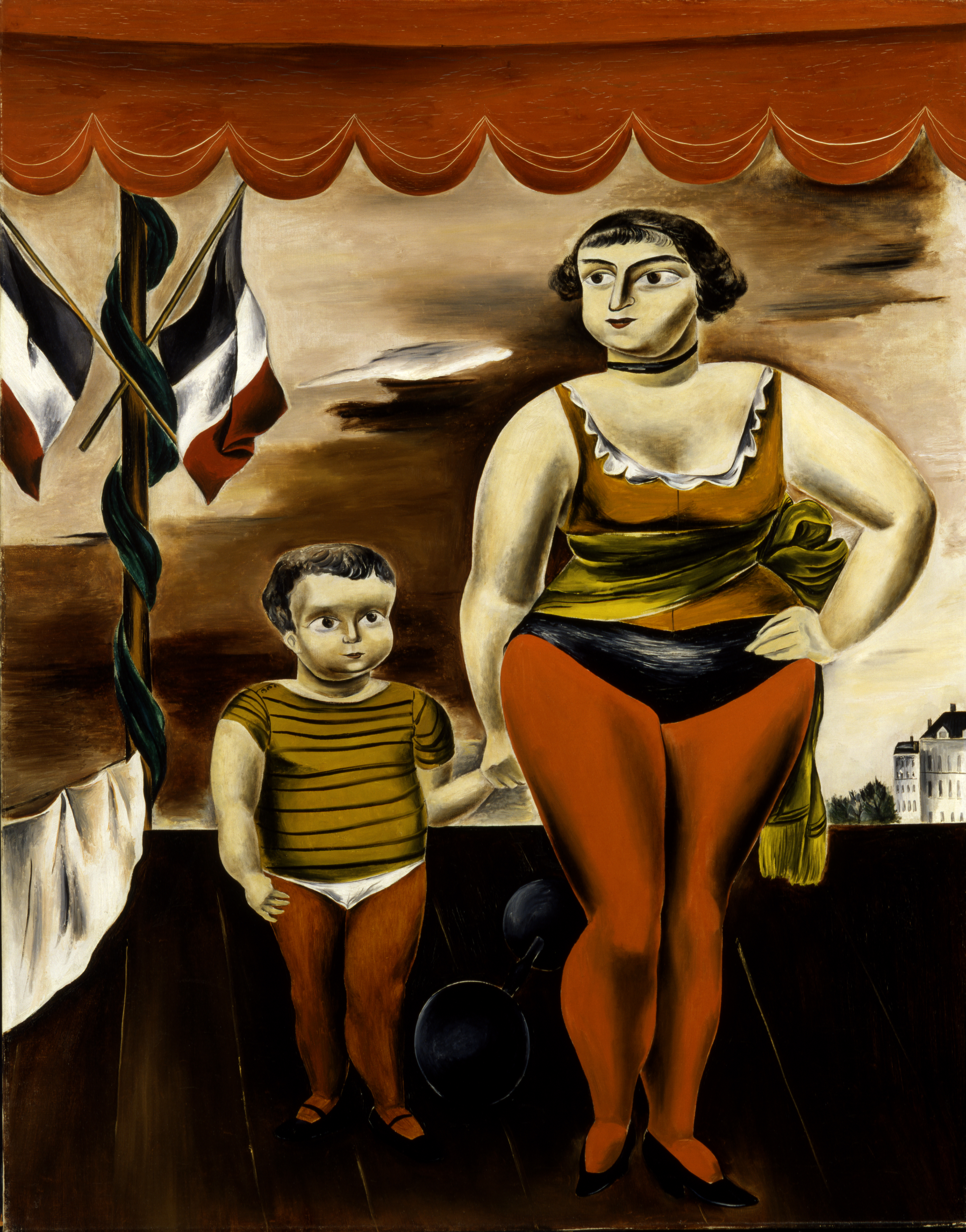
Strong Woman and Child (1925), Smithsonian American Art Museum

== See also ==
- Japanese American Committee for Democracy
- Japanese resistance to the Empire of Japan (1937–1945)

== Bibliography ==
- Goodrich, Lloyd (1969). "Introduction". A Special Loan Retrospective Exhibition of Works by Yasuo Kuniyoshi 1893–1953. Gainesville, FL: University Gallery, University of Florida.
- Riehlman, Franklin; Wolf, Tom (1983). Yasuo Kuniyoshi: artist as photographer. Annandale-on-Hudson, NY: Edith C. Blum Art Institute, The Bard College Center.
- Wolf, Tom (2008). "The Tip of the Iceberg: Early Asian American Artists in New York". Asian Art: A History, 1850–1970. Stanford, CA: Stanford University Press. pp. 83–109.
- Wang, ShiPu (2011). Becoming American: The Art and Identity Crisis of Yasuo Kuniyoshi. Honolulu, HI: University of Hawai'i.
- Yasuo Kuniyoshi 1889–1953: A Retrospective Exhibition. Austin Texas: The University of Texas at Austin. 1975.
- Becoming American?: Asian Identity Negotiated Through the Art of Yasuo Kuniyoshi By Shi-Pu Wang
