= Louis Jean Heydt =

American actor (1903–1960)

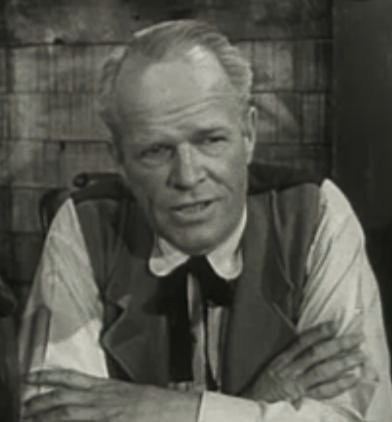
- Heydt in Raiders of Old California (1957)
- Born: April 17, 1903; Montclair, New Jersey, U.S.
- Died: January 29, 1960 (aged 56); Boston, Massachusetts, U.S.
- Resting place: Forest Lawn Memorial Park, Glendale, California
- Education: Dartmouth College
- Occupations: Actor, journalist
- Years active: 1933–1960
- Spouse(s): Leona Maricle (m. 1928; div. 19??) Donna Hanor (m. 1953)

Louis Jean Heydt (April 17, 1903 – January 29, 1960) was an American character actor in film, television, and theatre, most frequently seen in hapless, ineffectual, or fall-guy roles.

== Early life ==
Heydt was born in 1903 (not 1905, as many sources have miscited) in Montclair, New Jersey, the son of German parents George Frederick Heydt, a jeweler and the secretary and executor for Louis Comfort Tiffany, and the former Emma Foerster. He was educated at Montclair High School, Worcester Academy, and Dartmouth College, graduating from the latter in 1926. He initially wanted to be a journalist, and worked as a reporter for The New York World.

== Career ==
=== Stage ===
Heydt received his start in the theatre while visiting a classmate backstage while The Trial of Mary Dugan was in rehearsal. As an actual reporter, he caught the attention of the producers and was offered the role of a reporter in the play. He made his stage debut therein, and went on to appear in a dozen plays, including Strictly Dishonorable, Before Morning, and Happy Birthday. He also played in the London company of The Trial of Mary Dugan as the male lead, replacing the deceased Rex Cherryman.

After he left the Broadway production of The Trial of Mary Dugan, Heydt acted in stock theatre with the Alice Brady Company in Buffalo, Rochester, and Toronto. In the mid-1930s, his wife and he were active in summer stock theatre in Skowhegan, Maine.

=== Film ===
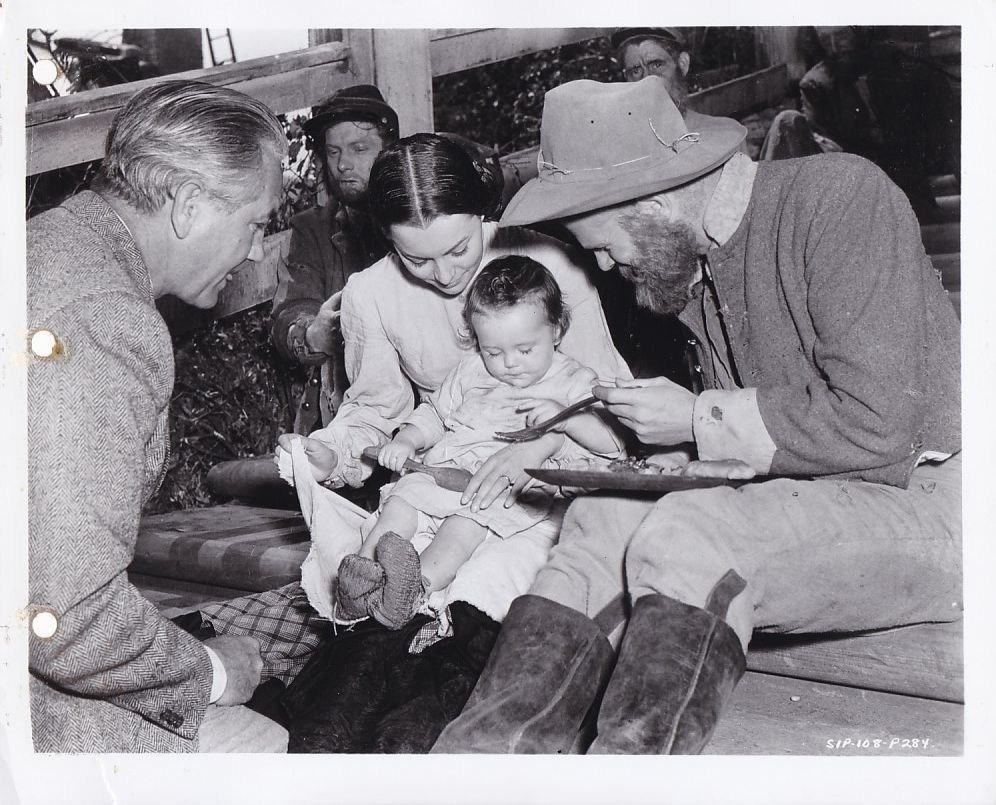
On set of Gone With the Wind (1939). L-R: Director Victor Fleming, Olivia de Havilland, and Louis Jean Heydt as one of the "hungry soldiers" at Tara

In the 1930s, Heydt traveled to Hollywood, where he appeared in over 100 films, including Gone With the Wind (1939), The Great McGinty (1940), Thirty Seconds Over Tokyo (1944), and The Big Sleep (1946). He made an impression as an older, warm-hearted soldier in the 1945 John Ford PT-boat epic They Were Expendable, and co-starred in the 1951 film noir Roadblock in support of Charles McGraw. Heydt remained active in Hollywood throughout the 1950s, appearing in 32 films through 1959.

=== Television ===
Heydt moved early into television, initially taking roles in basic Westerns and related programs such as outlaw Tom Horn on the 1950s Western television series Stories of the Century, starring and narrated by Jim Davis. He appeared in 11 episodes of Richard Carlson's 1958-1959 Western series, Mackenzie's Raiders.

Heydt guest-starred on the Adventures of Superman, Treasury Men in Action, Cavalcade of America, TV Reader's Digest, Crossroads, Lux Video Theatre, Fury, The Man from Blackhawk, Wagon Train, and Maverick.

== Personal life and death ==
Heydt married Leona Maricle, an actress in the Broadway company of The Trial of Mary Dugan, on August 13, 1928, in New York. He later married Donna Hanor.

Heydt died of a heart attack on January 29, 1960, in Boston, where he collapsed immediately after leaving the stage following the first scene of a pre-Broadway performance of the play, There Was a Little Girl, in which he appeared opposite Jane Fonda. Actor Joseph Curtiss carried him to his dressing room, but he apparently had died instantly. Heydt's understudy, William Adler, finished the performance and the run.

== Partial filmography ==
- Before Morning (1933) - Neil Kennedy
- Make Way for Tomorrow (1937) - Doctor
- Borrowing Trouble (1937) - Martin (uncredited)
- No Time to Marry (1938) - McClosky
- Test Pilot (1938) - Greg Benson
- They're Always Caught (1938, Short) - Eddie Diesel
- I Am the Law (1938) - John W. Butler
- They Made Me a Criminal (1939) - Smith
- Let Freedom Ring (1939) - Ned Wilkie
- They Made Her a Spy (1939) - Gillian
- The Flying Irishman (1939) - Man Betting Doug Won't Get Off the Ground (uncredited)
- Stronger Than Desire (1939) - Court Appointed Attorney (uncredited)
- Each Dawn I Die (1939) - Lassiter
- Charlie Chan at Treasure Island (1939) - Paul Essex
- Full Confession (1939) - Defense Attorney (uncredited)
- Mr. Smith Goes to Washington (1939) - Soapbox Speaker (uncredited)
- Dad for a Day (1939, Short) - Bill Henry (uncredited)
- Reno (1939) - Judge Jimmy Howard
- Joe and Ethel Turp Call on the President (1939) - Dr. Standish (uncredited)
- A Child Is Born (1939) - Mr. Kempner
- Gone With the Wind (1939) - Hungry Soldier Holding Beau Wilkes
- The Hunchback of Notre Dame (1939) - Minor Role (uncredited)
- Abe Lincoln in Illinois (1940) - Mentor Graham
- Dr. Ehrlich's Magic Bullet (1940) - Dr. Kunze
- Johnny Apollo (1940) - Guard with Doctor (uncredited)
- All About Hash (1940, Short) - Bob Henry, Mickey's father
- Irene (1940) - 'Biffy' Webster - the Columnist (uncredited)
- The Man Who Talked Too Much (1940) - Barton
- The Great McGinty (1940) - Tommy Thompson
- Pier 13 (1940) - Bill Hamilton
- Santa Fe Trail (1940) - Farmer (scenes deleted)
- Let's Make Music (1941) - Mr. Stevens
- High Sierra (1941) - Bob - Tourist at Robbery (uncredited)
- Sleepers West (1941) - Everett Jason
- Power Dive (1941) - Johnny Coles
- Dive Bomber (1941) - Swede Larson
- How Green Was My Valley (1941) - Miner (uncredited)
- Pacific Blackout (1941) - Harold Kermin
- Dr. Kildare's Victory (1942) - Mr. Ray Johnson (uncredited)
- Captains of the Clouds (1942) - Provost Marshal
- Canal Zone (1942) - Ralph Merrill (uncredited)
- Tortilla Flat (1942) - Young Doctor (uncredited)
- Ten Gentlemen from West Point (1942) - Jared Danforth
- Night in New Orleans (1942) - Bit (uncredited)
- The Glass Key (1942) - Man watching dice throw (uncredited)
- Manila Calling (1942) - Harold Watson
- Commandos Strike at Dawn (1942) - Karl Arnesen
- One Dangerous Night (1943) - Arthur
- Mission to Moscow (1943) - American Newsman (uncredited)
- Stage Door Canteen (1943) - Captain Robinson (uncredited)
- First Comes Courage (1943) - Norwegian (uncredited)
- The Iron Major (1943) - Recruiting Sergeant (uncredited)
- Gung Ho! (1943) - Lt. Roland Browning
- The Miracle of Morgan's Creek (1943) - Army Officer (uncredited)
- See Here, Private Hargrove (1944) - Captain Administering Oath (uncredited)
- Her Primitive Man (1944) - Gerald
- The Story of Dr. Wassell (1944) - Ensign (uncredited)
- The Great Moment (1944) - Dr. Horace Wells
- Thirty Seconds Over Tokyo (1944) - Lieut. Miller
- Betrayal from the East (1945) - Jack Marsden
- Zombies on Broadway (1945) - Douglas Walker
- You Came Along (1945) - Navy Man (uncredited)
- Our Vines Have Tender Grapes (1945) - Mr. Faraassen
- They Were Expendable (1945) - 'Ohio'
- To Each His Own (1946) - American Officer (uncredited)
- The Hoodlum Saint (1946) - Mike Flaherty
- The Big Sleep (1946) - Joe Brody
- Gentleman Joe Palooka (1946) - Chairman
- Abie's Irish Rose (1946) - Priest (uncredited)
- That Brennan Girl (1946) - Hefflin (uncredited)
- Sinbad the Sailor (1947) - Mercenary (uncredited)
- I Cover Big Town (1947) - John Moulton
- Spoilers of the North (1947) - Inspector Carl Winters
- California's Golden Beginning (1948, Short)
- Bad Men of Tombstone (1949) - John Stover
- Make Believe Ballroom (1949) - Jerskin Elliott (uncredited)
- Come to the Stable (1949) - Al Newman (uncredited)
- The Kid from Cleveland (1949) - Carl Novak
- Paid in Full (1950) - Dr. Carter, Psychiatrist
- The Furies (1950) - Bailey
- Al Jennings of Oklahoma (1951) - John Jennings
- The Great Missouri Raid (1951) - Charles Ford
- Rawhide (1951) - Fickert
- Raton Pass (1951) - Jim Pozner
- Two of a Kind (1951) - Chief Petty Officer (uncredited)
- Warpath (1951) - Herb Woodson
- Criminal Lawyer (1951) - Frank Burnett
- Drums in the Deep South (1951) - Col. House
- Roadblock (1951) - Harry Miller
- The Day the Earth Stood Still (1951) - Airforce Captain looking perplexed (uncredited)
- Close to My Heart (1951) - Probation Officer Duncan (uncredited)
- The Old West (1952) - Jeff Bleeker
- Sailor Beware (1952) - Naval Doctor (uncredited)
- Mutiny (1952) - Captain Herwig (uncredited)
- Flesh and Fury (1952) - Whitey
- Models Inc. (1952) - Cronin
- The Vanquished (1953) - Luke Taylor (uncredited)
- Island in the Sky (1953) - Fitch
- The Boy from Oklahoma (1954) - Paul Evans
- A Star Is Born (1954) - Ocean Scene Director (uncredited)
- Ten Wanted Men (1955) - Tom Baines (uncredited)
- Many Rivers to Cross (1955) - Noah Crawford (uncredited)
- The Eternal Sea (1955) - Capt. Walter F. Rodee
- No Man's Woman (1955) - Det. Lt. Colton
- Stranger at My Door (1956) - Sheriff John Tatum
- Wetbacks (1956) - Coast Guard Comdr. Randall
- The Fastest Gun Alive (1956) - Myron Spink (uncredited)
- Official Detective (1957, TV Series) - Detective Herman
- The Wings of Eagles (1957) - Dr. John Keye (uncredited)
- The Badge of Marshal Brennan (1957) - Col. Donaphin
- Raiders of Old California (1957) - Judge Ward Young
- The Man Who Died Twice (1958) - Capt. Andy Hampton
- Inside the Mafia (1959) - Rod Balcom

== Television ==
Year	Title	Role	Notes
1960	Rawhide	Wilson	S2:E15, "Incident of the Devil and His Due"
