= Leona Maricle =

American actress

- Born: December 23, 1905; Wichita Falls, Texas, U.S.
- Died: March 25, 1988 (aged 82); New York City, U.S.
- Occupation: Actress
- Years active: 1933–1946 (film)
- Spouse(s): Louis Jean Heydt (m. 1928; div. 1947 or 1948)

Leona Maricle (December 23, 1905 – March 25, 1988) was an American stage and film actress known for "distinctive characterizations of colorful ladies."

Maricle's parents were Mr. and Mrs. Peter Maricle. She was a graduate of the College of Industrial Arts. Her Broadway debut came in The Trial of Mary Dugan (1927). Her final appearance on Broadway was in Never Too Late (1962).

In the mid-1930s, she and her husband were active in summer stock theatre in Skowhegan, Maine.

Maricle married actor Louis Jean Heydt in New York City in 1928. They divorced in either 1947 or 1948. She did not remarry.

On March 25, 1988, Maricle died of an apparent heart attack in her apartment in Manhattan. Her obituary in The New York Times gave her age as 81.

== Selected filmography ==
- O'Shaughnessy's Boy (1935)
- Theodora Goes Wild (1936)
- Women of Glamour (1937)
- Woman Chases Man (1937)
- The Lone Wolf in Paris (1938)
- Curtain Call (1940)
- Under Age (1941)
- The Hard Way (1943)
- My Reputation (1946)

== Bibliography ==
- Blottner, Gene. Columbia Noir: A Complete Filmography, 1940-1962. McFarland, 2015.
