= No Way Out (1987 film) =

American thriller film by Roger Donaldson

- Theatrical release poster
- Directed by: Roger Donaldson
- Screenplay by: Robert Garland
- Based on: The Big Clock; 1946 novel by Kenneth Fearing
- Produced by: Robert Garland; Laura Ziskin
- Starring: Kevin Costner; Gene Hackman; Sean Young; Will Patton; Howard Duff
- Cinematography: John Alcott
- Edited by: Neil Travis
- Music by: Maurice Jarre
- Distributed by: Orion Pictures
- Release date: August 14, 1987 (US)
- Running time: 114 minutes
- Country: United States
- Language: English
- Budget: $15 million
- Box office: $35.5 million

No Way Out is a 1987 American neo-noir crime thriller film, directed by Roger Donaldson and written by Robert Garland based on the 1946 Kenneth Fearing novel The Big Clock. It stars Kevin Costner as Tom Farrell, a naval officer who enters a romantic relationship with Susan Atwell (Sean Young), the mistress of Secretary of Defense David Brice (Gene Hackman). Will Patton, Howard Duff, George Dzundza, Jason Bernard, Fred Thompson and Iman appear in supporting roles. No Way Out is the third film to be based on Fearing's novel, after The Big Clock (1948) and Police Python 357 (1976).

Upon its theatrical release in the United States on August 14, 1987, by Orion Pictures, No Way Out grossed $35.5 million at the box office and received positive reviews from film critics.

== Plot ==
In a house near the Pentagon, Lieutenant Commander Tom Farrell of the Office of Naval Intelligence is under interrogation, asked how he came to meet Secretary of Defense David Brice.

Six months earlier, Farrell is invited to an inaugural ball by his college friend Scott Pritchard, who glowingly introduces his boss, Secretary Brice. There, he meets Susan Atwell, and they spend a night of passion just before he ships out for the Philippines. Brice recalls Farrell to manage interactions with the CIA. Returning to Washington, D.C. for the assignment, he reunites with his old landlord, and his friend Sam Hesselman, who manages the Pentagon's computer center.

Farrell and Atwell become lovers and spend time together, even after she reveals she is also Brice's mistress, which both he and Pritchard disapprove of. Upon returning from a romantic weekend away, Brice unexpectedly visits Atwell's apartment, forcing Farrell to slip away reluctantly. Furious that Atwell has another lover, Brice strikes her, causing her to fall over an upstairs railing to her death. Distraught, he goes to Pritchard, who then meticulously removes all evidence of Brice from Atwell's apartment, including an indiscernible negative of a Polaroid photograph she had taken of Farrell.

Pritchard schemes to conflate Atwell's lover with a long-rumored KGB sleeper agent code-named Yuri – invoking "Yuri" puts the entire department's focus on finding Atwell's lover. Thereby he would then be killed before the investigation reached Brice's involvement with Atwell. After confirming Atwell never photographed Brice, he plants the Polaroid negative with the other evidence collected from her apartment.

Shocked to learn of Atwell's death, Farrell realizes that the evidence implicates himself. His position becomes more endangered when Pritchard informs him of their plot to kill Atwell's lover. The CIA are puzzled by the resources allocated to the investigation and quickly conclude that Pritchard, being homosexual, could not be Atwell's lover.

Hesselman commences a computer image enhancement of the weak photograph, a process that can take days. Army CID Officers turn in a Moroccan jewel box to Farrell that Brice had gifted Atwell. Farrell requests Hesselman search the State Department's computers for Brice's declaration of receipt of the foreign gift. Pritchard and Farrell question Atwell's friend Nina Beka, who reveals she knew Brice was seeing Atwell, but keeps Farrell's involvement secret. Pritchard sends two assassins to eliminate her, but Farrell chases them and saves her.

As the computer slowly reveals features in the photograph, Farrell confides in Hesselman that he is the person in the photo, and that he was in love with Atwell. He convinces him to delay the image enhancement to buy time. The CID bring in two witnesses who can identify Atwell's lover; one of them spots Farrell across the hall, confirming to the investigators that "Yuri" is inside the Pentagon, so they commence a room-by-room search, which Farrell narrowly eludes by climbing into a ceiling vent in his office.

Under pressure to clear himself, Farrell informs Hesselman of Brice's guilt and his incriminating gift to Atwell. He then desperately persuades him to insert into the computer registry a fake declaration of receipt of the Moroccan jewel box. Concerned at Farrell's behavior, Hesselman consults Pritchard in private, who shoots him dead.

Farrell evades Pritchard's assassins, and confronts Brice with a printout of the foreign gift registry. Pritchard implicates Farrell for the two murders and pulls a gun on him. Comprehending that Pritchard really killed Hesselman, Brice comes to his senses and separates them. He suggests Pritchard take the fall for Atwell's murder with the motive being Pritchard's infatuation with Brice and jealousy of his time spent with her.

Pritchard is devastated at Brice's betrayal, his callous revelation of his insecurities, and his change of allegiance to Farrell. He shoots himself and Brice indicates to the investigators that Pritchard is Yuri, concluding the search. Farrell sends the printout to the CIA director Marshall, and leaves as the finished photograph reveals him as Atwell's lover.

Sitting at Atwell's grave, Farrell is picked up by a pair of operatives and interrogated at the house. His landlord Schiller is revealed to be his handler – all of them are Soviet agents, and Farrell turns out to in fact be "Yuri", a deep-cover spy serving as a high-level mole. He is offered a chance to return to the Soviet Union, but he declines and leaves.

== Cast ==
- Kevin Costner as Lieutenant Commander Tom Farrell
- Gene Hackman as Secretary of Defense David Brice
- Sean Young as Susan Atwell
- Will Patton as Scott Pritchard
- Howard Duff as Senator Duvall
- George Dzundza as Dr. Sam Hesselman
- Jason Bernard as Major Donovan
- Iman as Nina Beka
- Fred Dalton Thompson as CIA Director Marshall
- Leon Russom as Kevin O'Brien
- Dennis Burkley as Mate
- Marshall Bell as Contra #1
- Chris D. as Contra #2
- Nicholas Worth as Cup Breaker
- John D'Aquino as Lieutenant John Chadway
- Michael Shillo as Schiller
- David Paymer as Technician
- Robert Kerman as CID Man

== Production ==
=== Writing ===
The film is based on Kenneth Fearing's 1947 novel The Big Clock with screen story and screenplay by Robert Garland.

=== Filming ===
The exteriors were shot on location in Baltimore, Annapolis, Arlington, Washington, D.C., and Auckland, New Zealand, between April and June 1986. The film is dedicated to the memory of its celebrated British cinematographer John Alcott, who died at the age of 55 after principal photography had wrapped in July 1986, a year before the film's release.

=== Music ===
The film features original music by Academy Award-winning composer Maurice Jarre. The title song, "No Way Out", was performed by Paul Anka.

== Reception ==
=== Box office ===
The film debuted at number two at the US box office after Stakeout with $4.3 million. The film's budget was an estimated $15 million; its total U.S. gross was $35.5 million.

=== Critical response ===
Contemporary film critic Roger Ebert gave the film 4 out of 4 stars, calling it "truly labyrinthine and ingenious." Richard Schickel of Time wrote, "Viewers who arrive at the movie five minutes late and leave five minutes early will avoid the setup and payoff for the preposterous twist that spoils this lively, intelligent remake of 1948's The Big Clock." Desson Thomson of The Washington Post wrote, "The film makes such good use of Washington and builds suspense so well that it transcends a plot bordering on ridiculous."

As of 2022, the film holds an approval rating of 92% on Rotten Tomatoes based on 48 reviews, with an average rating of 7.4/10. The website's critics consensus states: "Roger Donaldson's modern spin on the dense, stylish suspense films of the 1940s features fine work from Gene Hackman and Sean Young, as well as the career-making performance that made Kevin Costner a star." The film has a weighted average score of 77 out of 100 on Metacritic, based on 18 critics, indicating "generally favorable reviews". Audiences polled by CinemaScore gave the film an average grade of "B+" on an A+ to F scale.

== See also ==
- Culture during the Cold War
