= The Electric Horseman =

1979 film by Sydney Pollack

- Theatrical release poster
- Directed by: Sydney Pollack
- Written by: Paul Gaer; Robert Garland
- Story by: Shelly Burton
- Produced by: Ray Stark
- Starring: Robert Redford; Jane Fonda; Valerie Perrine; Willie Nelson
- Cinematography: Owen Roizman
- Edited by: Sheldon Kahn
- Music by: Dave Grusin
- Production companies: Universal Pictures; Columbia Pictures; Wildwood Enterprises; Rastar Films
- Distributed by: Columbia Pictures (United States); Universal Pictures (through Cinema International Corporation; International)
- Release date: December 21, 1979
- Running time: 121 minutes
- Country: United States
- Language: English
- Budget: $12.5 million
- Box office: $61.8 million

The Electric Horseman is a 1979 American Western comedy-drama film starring Robert Redford and Jane Fonda and directed by Sydney Pollack. The film is about a former rodeo champion who is hired by a cereal company to become its spokesperson, and then runs away on a $12 million electric-lit horse and costume he is given to promote it in Las Vegas after he finds that the horse has been abused.

The Electric Horseman was released by Columbia Pictures on December 21, 1979 in the United States, with Universal Pictures (through Cinema International Corporation) releasing in other territories. The film received mixed reviews from critics and grossed $61.8 million against a $12.5 million budget.

== Plot ==
Retired rodeo champion Sonny Steele is the national spokesman for Ranch breakfast cereal, touring the country in a flashy cowboy costume. His manager, Wendell, and assistant, Leroy, struggle to keep Sonny sober, and his employer, AMPCO Industries, is increasingly disappointed in his performance. Hallie Martin, a New York television newscaster, attends an AMPCO media event in Las Vegas, and wonders why the company discourages interviews with Sonny.

During rehearsals for a variety show at Caesars Palace, Sonny notices that Rising Star, the champion racehorse he will be riding, has been drugged with tranquilizers. He complains to AMPCO's chairman, Hunt Sears, that the stallion - AMPCO's new corporate symbol - is being exploited. Sears rebuffs him. At the performance, Sonny rides Rising Star on stage in the middle of a disco musical number, then out of the casino and out of town. AMPCO executives want to locate Sonny before the press, worried he will expose their treatment of Rising Star and jeopardize a pending $300 million merger.

Sonny borrows a camper van from his friend Gus Atwater in the Nevada desert, and drives to Utah with Rising Star. He detoxifies the stallion and treats a swollen tendon. Hallie, investigating Sonny's disappearance, tracks down Gus and follows Sonny's trail to a campsite. Sonny refuses to answer her questions and punctures the tires of her car to prevent pursuit. Hallie returns to Las Vegas and reports she found Sonny and Rising Star but keeps the location confidential.

Sonny travels to St. George, Utah, and learns a massive search is underway for Rising Star. AMPCO has publicly accused him of being an alcoholic who seeks to harm the horse, and have accused him of grand larceny. He telephones Hallie and promises her a story if she can leave Las Vegas without being followed. They meet in a remote canyon and Hallie videotapes Sonny disclosing that Rising Star was pumped with drugs. Declaring the horse has earned a better life, Sonny confides to Hallie he'll set Rising Star loose at a secret destination.

Based on interviews with Sonny's estranged wife, Hallie assumes Sonny is taking Rising Star to Rim Rock Canyon. Hallie arranges to meet a camera crew at Rim Rock and sees a strong police presence there. She dispatches the videotape to a television affiliate in St. George, and returns to warn Sonny that if he doesn't accompany her, the authorities will force her to reveal all she knows. Sonny tells Hallie to drive the camper to a lake near Cisco Falls, while he distracts the police on Rising Star. Using his rodeo skills and the horse's speed, Sonny evades capture and meets Hallie at the lake.

When the videotape is broadcast, the public perceives him as a hero. Sonny, Hallie, and Rising Star leave the camper behind and begin walking. They encounter a local farmer who offers to drive them to the next county in a tractor-trailer, forgoing the $50,000 reward for Sonny's capture. The animosity between Sonny and Hallie dissipates, and they become lovers. Hallie is impressed by Sonny's knowledge of the outdoors and his integrity, and Sonny admires her street smarts and talents as a reporter.

The AMPCO executives notice that Sonny's newfound popularity has boosted cereal sales, and they begin to reverse their position. Sonny and Hallie spend the night at an old hunting cabin, and Hallie reveals she ordered television cameras to meet them at Rim Rock but now regrets it. Sonny refuses to change his plans despite the possibility the police will be there. They arrive at a deserted canyon and Sonny explains to a confused Hallie there are no cameras because he had always intended to free Rising Star in Silver Reef. Hallie kisses Rising Star goodbye before Sonny releases the stallion into a herd of feral horses.

AMPCO executives waiting at Rim Rock with television reporters and a welcoming banner realize the've been tricked. Hallie and Sonny enjoy a meal together in St. George before going their separate ways. Back in New York City, Hallie reports on her journey with Sonny and mentions that all charges against the cowboy have been dropped, while the whereabouts of Rising Star are still unknown.

== Cast ==
- Robert Redford as Norman "Sonny" Steele
- Jane Fonda as Alice “Hallie” Martin
- Valerie Perrine as Charlotta Bell
- Willie Nelson as Wendell Hickson
- John Saxon as Hunt Sears
- Nicolas Coster as Fitzgerald
- Allan Arbus as Danny
- Wilford Brimley as Farmer
- Will Hare as Gus Atwater
- Basil Hoffman as Toland
- Timothy Scott as Leroy
- James B. Sikking as Dietrich

== Production ==
=== Development ===
Casting for The Electric Horseman either continued or led to many reoccurring collaborations between cast and crew members. On November 28, 1978, Robert Redford was announced to star in the film, becoming the fifth film in which Sydney Pollack directed Redford following This Property Is Condemned (1966), Jeremiah Johnson (1972), The Way We Were (1973), and Three Days of the Condor (1975). This director-actor relationship would continue with two more films: Out of Africa (1985) and Havana (1990). Pollack had also previously directed Fonda in They Shoot Horses, Don't They? (1969), whereas Redford and Fonda previously teamed on The Chase (1966) and Barefoot in the Park (1967).

The Electric Horseman is noted as being the debut acting performance of long-time country and western singer Willie Nelson, who plays the role of Wendell Hickson. According to Pollack, Nelson improvised most of his dialogue in the film. Pollack later would be executive producer for Nelson's 1980 starring vehicle Honeysuckle Rose. The film was also only the second film performance of character actor Wilford Brimley, who later teamed with Redford in The Natural (1984).

=== Filming ===
"For Electric Horseman, I literally ended up writing half of every night before we would shoot. We make jokes now about my saying, 'Let's pick the longest location cause I have time to write the scene by the time we get there.' And that's literally true. There were yellow pads all over the place; we're writing out to work in the morning."

— Sydney Pollack, describing script troubles.

Principal photography for The Electric Horseman took place during late 1978 and early 1979 throughout Nevada and Utah. While the film was prominently shot on location in Las Vegas and Red Rock Canyon National Conservation Area, additional filming took place in various locations across the state of Utah, including Grafton, St. George, and Zion National Park.

While filming generally went smoothly, Pollack struggled with revising the script while filming was underway. In addition, one particular day occurred in which production was continuously delayed due to traveling thunderstorms that interrupted the 20-second kissing scene between Redford and Fonda. Ultimately, the scene ended up requiring 48 takes that pushed costs to $280,000. The film went over budget by $1.3 million, spending a total of $12.5 million.

=== Music ===
The musical score to The Electric Horseman was composed by Dave Grusin. In addition to co-starring, Willie Nelson contributed significantly to the film's soundtrack, singing five songs, including "My Heroes Have Always Been Cowboys", "Midnight Rider", "Mammas Don't Let Your Babies Grow Up to Be Cowboys", "So You Think You're a Cowboy", and "Hands on the Wheel". Coinciding with the film's release, a soundtrack album was released featuring both Nelson's songs and Grusin's score.

== Release and reception ==
The Electric Horseman was released theatrically in the United States on December 21, 1979. Even with the budget escalating to $12.5 million, the film was a box-office success after grossing a domestic total of nearly $62 million. While the film was co-produced by Columbia Pictures and Universal Pictures, and distributed by Columbia domestically and Universal internationally, the US film rights later reverted to Universal. It has since been released on CED (Capacitance Electronic Disc) Videodiscs, VHS, Betamax, LaserDisc, DVD and Blu-ray by Universal Studios, although current home video releases have replaced "My Heroes Have Always Been Cowboys" with a generic instrumental sound-alike recording in the opening title sequence. A 2019 North American Universal Blu-ray edition returns the music removed on many past video releases.

While the film was a commercial success, it received mixed reviews upon release. Film review aggregate website Rotten Tomatoes reports that 64% of critics gave the film a positive review based on 22 reviews with a "Fresh" rating, with an average score of 5.83/10. The film was also nominated for an Academy Award in 1980 for Best Sound (Arthur Piantadosi, Les Fresholtz, Michael Minkler and Al Overton Jr.). Gene Siskel of the Chicago Tribune called the film "a nicely polished piece of entertainment from director Sydney Pollack, who regularly works with the biggest of stars and rarely lets his camera get in the way of those stars." Siskel, who gave the film three stars, highlighted what he detected to be genuine chemistry between Redford and Fonda. He also lauded the movie's "outstanding secondary cast", including Saxon, Coster, and Nelson. Roger Ebert gave the film three out of four stars and called it "the kind of movie they used to make. It's an oddball love story about a guy and a girl and a prize racehorse, and it has a chase scene and some smooching and a happy ending. It could have starred Tracy and Hepburn, or Gable and Colbert, but it doesn't need to because this time it stars Robert Redford and Jane Fonda."

== See also ==
- List of films about horses
