= Before Morning =

1933 film

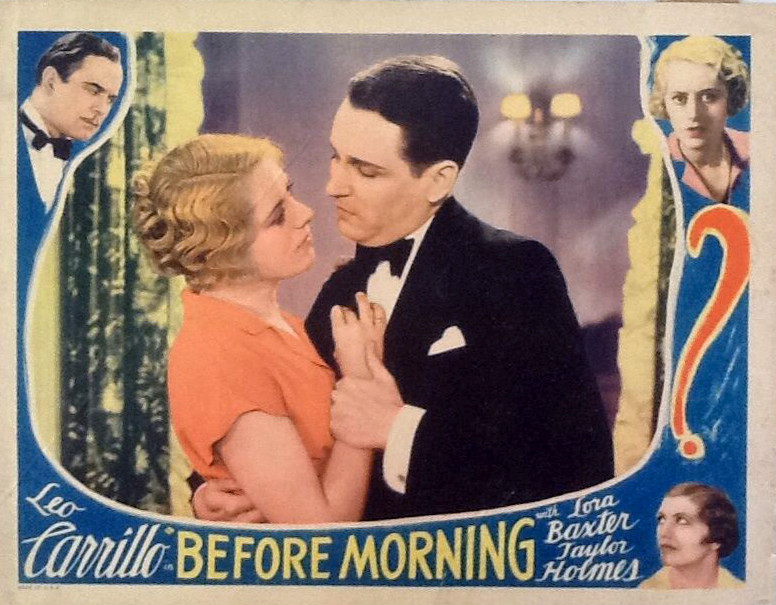
- Film's lobby card
- Directed by: Arthur Hoerl
- Written by: Arthur Hoerl (adaptation)
- Based on: Before Morning by Edward and Edna Riley
- Produced by: Robert Mintz
- Starring: Leo Carrillo; Lora Baxter; Taylor Holmes
- Cinematography: Frank Zucker; Walter Strenge
- Edited by: Joseph Silverstein
- Production companies: Stage and Screen Productions, Inc.
- Distributed by: State Rights
- Release date: November 18, 1933
- Running time: 56 minutes
- Country: United States
- Language: English

Before Morning is a 1933 American pre-Code crime drama directed by Arthur Hoerl, and starring Leo Carrillo, Lora Baxter, and Taylor Holmes. The film was adapted for the screen by Arthur Hoerl, from the 1933 Broadway play of the same name by Edward and Edna Riley.

== Plot ==
Actress Elsie Manning is engaged to Horace Baker, but has also been in a romantic relationship with James Nichols who has named her as the beneficiary in his will. Not knowing about her engagement, Nichols asks his wife for a divorce and is refused. Nichols dies in Manning's apartment after she tells him she's engaged to Baker. When Baker arrives on the scene, he agrees to help her dispose of the body by having Nichols moved to a sanitarium. The owner, Dr. Gruelle, tells them Nichols was murdered by poison and attempts to extort money from Manning for his statement that the death was of natural causes. Gruelle tries the same scam on the widow of Nichols, who eventually agrees when the poison is found in her purse. It is revealed that Gruelle is in reality Police Inspector Maitland, intent on solving the murder.

== Cast ==
- Leo Carrillo – Dr. Gruelle/Mr. Maitland
- Lora Baxter as Elsie Manning
- Taylor Holmes as Leo Bergman
- Blaine Cordner as Horace Baker
- Louise Prussing as Mrs. Nichols
- Russell Hicks as James Nichols
- Louis Jean Heydt as Neil Kennedy
- Jules Epailly as Ben Ayoub
- Constance Bertrand as Diane
- Terry Carroll as Doris
- Victor Kilian as House Detective (uncredited)
