= Women of Glamour =

1937 film by Gordon Wiles

- Directed by: Gordon Wiles
- Written by: Lynn Starling; Mary C. McCall Jr.; Milton Herbert Gropper
- Starring: Virginia Bruce; Melvyn Douglas; Reginald Denny
- Cinematography: Henry Freulich; J. Peverell Marley
- Edited by: Otto Meyer
- Music by: Morris Stoloff
- Production company: Columbia Pictures
- Distributed by: Columbia Pictures
- Release date: March 9, 1937
- Running time: 68 minutes
- Country: United States
- Language: English

Women of Glamour is a 1937 American comedy film directed by Gordon Wiles and starring Virginia Bruce, Melvyn Douglas and Reginald Denny.

It is a remake of the 1930 film Ladies of Leisure, which was itself based on the 1926 silent film Ladies of Leisure. The film's sets were designed by the art director Stephen Goosson.

== Main cast ==
- Virginia Bruce as Gloria Hudson
- Melvyn Douglas as Richard 'Dick' Stark
- Reginald Denny as Fritz 'Frederick' Eagan
- Pert Kelton as Nan LaRoque
- Leona Maricle as Carol Coulter
- Thurston Hall as Mr. Stark
- Mary Forbes as Mrs. Stark
- Maurice Cass as Caldwell
- Clarissa Selwynne as Woman

== Bibliography ==
- Goble, Alan. The Complete Index to Literary Sources in Film. Walter de Gruyter, 1999.
