= The Big Clock (film) =

1948 film by John Farrow

- Theatrical release poster
- Directed by: John Farrow
- Screenplay by: Jonathan Latimer
- Based on: The Big Clock; 1946 novel by Kenneth Fearing
- Produced by: Richard Maibaum
- Starring: Ray Milland; Charles Laughton; Maureen O'Sullivan; George Macready; Rita Johnson; Elsa Lanchester; Harold Vermilyea
- Cinematography: John F. Seitz
- Edited by: LeRoy Stone
- Music by: Victor Young
- Color process: Black and white
- Production company: Paramount Pictures
- Distributed by: Paramount Pictures
- Release date: April 9, 1948 (United States)
- Running time: 95 minutes
- Country: United States
- Language: English
- Box office: $2 million (U.S. rentals)

The Big Clock is a 1948 American film noir thriller directed by John Farrow and adapted by novelist-screenwriter Jonathan Latimer from the 1946 novel of the same title by Kenneth Fearing. The Big Clock stars Ray Milland and Charles Laughton, with Maureen O'Sullivan, George Macready, Rita Johnson and Elsa Lanchester in support.

== Plot ==
George Stroud, editor-in-chief of Crimeways magazine, hides from building security inside the "big clock" which dominates the lobby of the Janoth Publications building where he works. It is the largest and most sophisticated clock ever built.

Thirty-six hours earlier, Stroud was eager to embark on a long-postponed honeymoon in Wheeling, West Virginia, with his wife Georgette and son George Jr. His tyrannical boss Earl Janoth wants him to stay in New York City to pursue a missing-person story that Stroud has just cracked, but Stroud refuses and Janoth fires him. Stroud goes to a bar to drink and is distracted by the attentions of Janoth's glamorous mistress, Pauline York, who proposes a blackmail plan against Janoth. When Stroud loses track of time and misses his train, Georgette angrily leaves without him. Stroud spends the evening painting the town with York, buying a painting and a sundial.

Stroud and York go to her apartment, but York sees Janoth arriving and Stroud leaves. Janoth sees someone depart but does not recognize the figure in the dark. Janoth assumes that York is cheating on him, leading to a quarrel in which he strikes York with the sundial, killing her. Janoth goes to his assistant Hagen and tells him what happened, intending to surrender to the police and confess. However, Hagen convinces him that they can frame the man whom Janoth saw leaving York's apartment for the crime. Janoth decides to use the resources of Crimeways to find the man instead of calling the police.

Stroud has since caught up with Georgette and George Jr. in West Virginia and tells her that he has been fired, but leaves out his adventures with York. Janoth calls to rehire him to lead the effort to find the "mystery man" Janoth claims is responsible for murdering York. Stroud reluctantly agrees to return to New York, to Georgette's disappointment.

During the manhunt, Stroud makes a pretense of leading the investigation diligently while secretly conducting his own probe. York's identity is revealed by the Crimeways team, and witnesses who saw her on the town with the mystery man are brought to the Janoth Building. One is eccentric artist Louise Patterson, who painted the canvas that Stroud purchased. Asked to create a portrait of the mystery man, she produces a modernist abstract of blobs and swirls.

Stroud tries to avoid the witnesses, but one sees and recognizes him as the mystery man. He slips away before he can be identified to investigators, who now know that the mystery man is in the building. All exits are sealed but the main door. Security men sweep the building for the suspect.

Stroud evades the dragnet by various maneuvers, finally hiding in the clock. He confronts Janoth and Hagen and presents evidence that appears to point to Hagen as the killer. Hagen implores Janoth to clear him, but Janoth tells him only that he will provide him with the best possible legal defense. Enraged, Hagen turns on Janoth and reveals that Janoth killed York and that he helped with the coverup. Janoth shoots Hagen and flees to the elevator, but its car is stuck floors below. Janoth falls down its shaft to his death.

== Cast ==
- Ray Milland as George Stroud
- Charles Laughton as Earl Janoth
- Maureen O'Sullivan as Georgette Stroud
- George Macready as Steve Hagen
- Rita Johnson as Pauline York
- Elsa Lanchester as Louise Patterson
- Harold Vermilyea as Don Klausmeyer
- Dan Tobin as Ray Cordette
- Henry Morgan as Bill Womack
- Richard Webb as Nat Sperling
- Elaine Riley as Lily Gold
- Luis Van Rooten as Edwin Orlin
- Lloyd Corrigan as Colonel Jefferson Randolph/McKinley
- Frank Orth as Burt
- Philip Van Zandt as Sidney Kislav
- Henri Letondal as Antique Dealer
- Douglas Spencer as Bert Finch
- Margaret Field as Second Secretary
- Bobby Watson as Morton Spaulding
- B.G. Norman as George Stroud Jr.
- Frances Morris as Grace Adams
- Harry Rosenthal as Charlie
- Ernő Verebes as Waiter
- James Burke as O'Brien
- Lucille Barkley as Hat Check Girl

== Production ==
Paramount bought the rights to the novel The Big Clock by Kenneth Fearing before publication for a reported $45,000. Fearing's 1939 novel The Hospital had been a best seller. Jonathan Latimer was assigned to write the script and Ray Milland to star. Leslie Fenton was announced as director, but he was held up on Saigon so John Farrow took over. Charles Laughton was cast as the villain Earl Janoth. This was Maureen O'Sullivan's first film in five years, since Tarzan's New York Adventure, after which she had concentrated on raising her family. She did it as a favor for her husband, director John Farrow.

Filming began February 17, 1947.

== Reception ==
The film was very well received by critics.

Bosley Crowther of The New York Times extolled the film's virtues as a thriller, writing, "When you hear the musical chime at the end of this ticking review of The Big Clock, it will be exactly the time for all devotees of detective films to make a mental memorandum to see it without possible fail." He added that the film "is a dandy clue-chaser of the modern chromium-plated type [and] requires close attention from the start ... Scriptwriter Jonathan Latimer and Director John Farrow have fetched a film which is fast-moving, humorous, atmospheric and cumulative of suspense." Critic James Agee writing in The Nation in 1948 characterized it as "An overrated but slickly amusing melodrama, with many good bits of comic directing by John Farrow."

Film critic Bruce Eder wrote, "The Big Clock is a near-perfect match for the book, telling in generally superb visual style a tale set against the backdrop of upscale 1940s New York and offering an early (but accurate) depiction of the modern media industry." Leonard Maltin gave it three of four stars: "Vibrant melodrama; taut script by Jonathan Latimer ... Elsa Lanchester has hilarious vignette as eccentric artist." Leslie Halliwell wrote: "Slick but rather empty thriller with judicious use of adequate talent."

In a 1996 essay, film noir historians Alain Silver and James Ursini discussed Farrow's technique: "Narration and long take are combined to enhance suspense...but the other items of noir style, the dark cityscape, the camera moves, the low-key sets, all these are used to disorient the viewer." In 1998, film writer David N. Meyer wrote, "More screwball comedy than noir, The Big Clock's big moments derive from snappy dialogue and over-the-top humor." Dennis Schwartz wrote in 2004 that "John Farrow directs this thrilling psychological film noir with style, though it's barely a work of noir in the full sense of that genre."

In 2001, the American Film Institute nominated this film for AFI's 100 Years...100 Thrills.

As of October 23, 2022, the film holds a rare 100% "Fresh" rating on Rotten Tomatoes based on 10 reviews, with an average rating of 7.8/10.

== Remakes ==
The story was remade in 1976 as Police Python 357 with Yves Montand, and in 1987 as No Way Out with Kevin Costner. The 1948 film is closest to the novel. The 1976 remake, on the other hand, updated the events to the Orléans Police Department in France, whereas the 1987 remake updated the events to the United States Department of Defense in Washington, D.C. during the Cold War.
