= Robert Garland (screenwriter) =

American screenwriter and film producer (1937–2020)

- Born: May 1, 1937; Brooklyn, New York City, New York, U.S.
- Died: November 21, 2020 (aged 83); Baltimore, Maryland, U.S.
- Occupation(s): Screenwriter, film producer
- Children: 1

Robert Warner Garland (May 1, 1937 – November 21, 2020) was an American screenwriter and film producer best known for his work in the films The Electric Horseman (1979) and No Way Out (1987). He was a member of the Writers Guild of America.

== Early life and education ==
Garland was born on May 1, 1937, in Brooklyn. He attended St. John's College in Annapolis, Maryland.

== Personal life and death ==
Garland retired from screenwriting in the mid-1990s and resided in several places around the world including Paris, France, Liguria and Key West.

Garland died from complications of dementia at the age of 83 in Baltimore on November 21, 2020. He is survived by his son Michael, daughter-in-law Hedda and grandsons Jonah and Felix.

== Filmography ==
- The Electric Horseman (1979; screenwriter)
- No Way Out (1987; screenwriter/producer)
- The Big Blue (1988; screenwriter)
