= Hobohemia =

Term for type of neighborhood

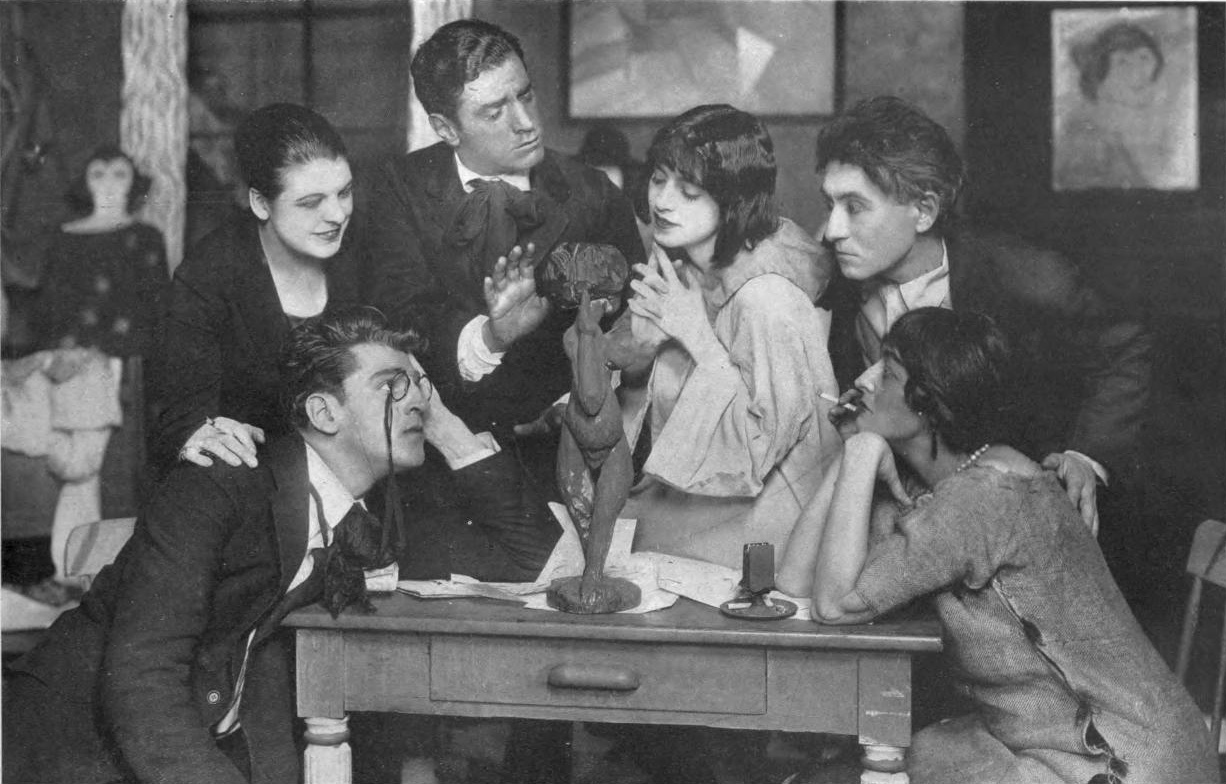
A scene from Sinclair Lewis's 1919 play Hobohemia

Hobohemia is a low-rent district in a city where artistic bohemians and the down-and-outs or hobos mix. In Chicago from the turn of the century to circa 1940s this was Tower Town and the area often known as "The West Madison Stem" (Madison Street west of downtown) which was known as "Skid road" and home to thousands of transient men and women, and Ben Reitman's Hobo College. In New York City it was the neighborhood of the Bowery, and Greenwich Village. It was the title of a short story by Sinclair Lewis originally published in The Saturday Evening Post, which Lewis subsequently reworked into a three-act comedy which was first performed at the Greenwich Village Theatre in 1919.

A reference appears in the Rodgers and Hart song The Lady is a Tramp: "My Hobohemia is the place to be."

== See also ==
- Skid row
