= Nan Lurie =

American artist

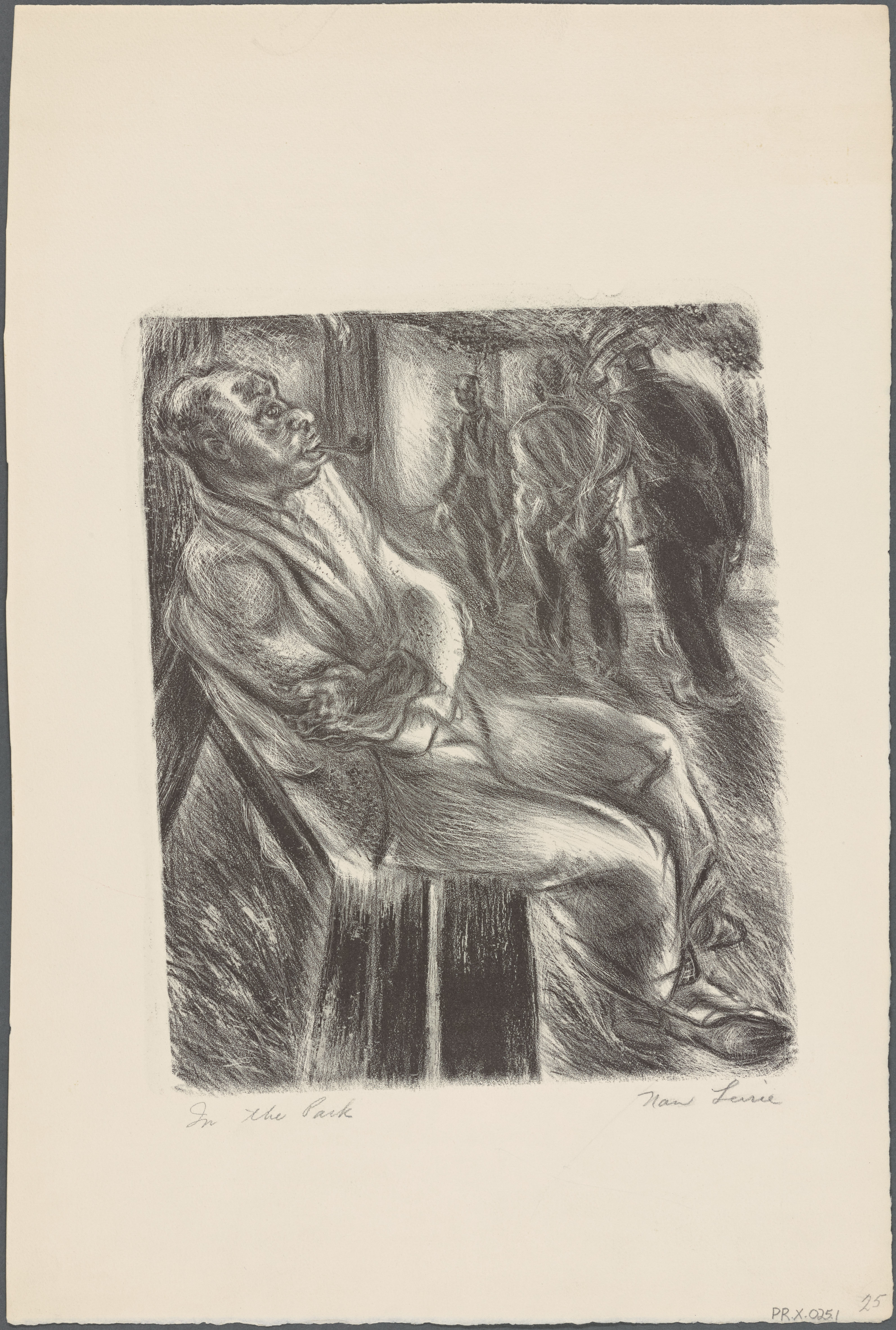
In the Park, lithograph by Nan Lurie for the Federal Art Project

Nan Lurie (1906–1985) was an American printmaker and engraver (born in Odessa) known for 1930s works about racism and about the daily life of African Americans.

She studied with Yasuo Kuniyoshi at the Art Students League. She married Kenneth Fearing on June 18, 1945.

She was a member of the Federal Art Project in New York City from 1935 to 1942.

Her work is held by the Smithsonian American Art Museum.

== Works ==
- Despair lithograph, n.d.
- Old Tales lithograph, n.d.
- Sand Yard lithograph, n.d.
- Sandyard lithograph, n.d.
- Speaker lithograph, n.d.
- Subway Bootblack lithograph, 1935-1943
- Subway Scene lithograph, n.d.
- Sunday Afternoon lithograph, n.d.
- Women's House of Detention print, 1936-1939
- Technological Improvements, print, 1936-1939
- Next, lithograph, 1936-1939
