= California's Golden Beginning =

1948 film

- Directed by: Cecil B. DeMille; Herbert Coleman
- Written by: Jack Roberts
- Produced by: Grant Leenhouts
- Starring: John Eldredge; Louis Jean Heydt
- Edited by: Frank Brock
- Distributed by: Paramount Pictures
- Release date: 1948
- Country: United States
- Language: English

California's Golden Beginning is a 1948 short film directed by Cecil B. DeMille. It was preserved by the Academy Film Archive in 2010.

== Cast ==
- John Eldredge
- Louis Jean Heydt
- Harold Vermilyea
- Lane Chandler
- Will Wright
- Irving Bacon
