= Police Python 357 =

- Directed by: Alain Corneau
- Screenplay by: Alain Corneau; Daniel Boulanger
- Story by: Alain Corneau; Daniel Boulanger
- Based on: The Big Clock by Kenneth Fearing
- Produced by: Albina du Boisrouvray
- Starring: Yves Montand; Simone Signoret; François Périer; Mathieu Carrière; Stefania Sandrelli
- Cinematography: Étienne Becker
- Edited by: Marie-Josèphe Yoyotte
- Music by: Georges Delerue
- Production companies: Albina Productions; TIT Film-produktion
- Distributed by: Les Films La Boëtie
- Release dates: March 31, 1976 (France); September 9, 1976 (West Germany)
- Running time: 125 minutes
- Countries: France; West Germany
- Language: French

Police Python 357 (also known as The Case Against Ferro) is a 1976 French crime-thriller film written and directed by Alain Corneau. It is partially an adaptation of the storyline of Kenneth Fearing's 1946 novel, The Big Clock, along with childhood experiences by Corneau.

== Plot ==
1975, Marc Ferrot Police Officer in Orléans, France is nearing retirement age. He has an affair with the younger woman Sylvia. Sylvia does not tell that she has an affair with some one else: Sylvia gets killed by Ganay.

Ganay tells his wife who is bedridden that he killed Sylvia. His wife who knows that he has an affair with Sylvia (for a long time) tells him not to tell the police.

Marc Ferrot gets the murder case by his superior who is Ganay. Neither knows of each others involvement in Sylvia.

== Cast ==
- Yves Montand as Inspector Marc Ferrot
- Simone Signoret as Thérèse Ganay
- François Périer as Police Commissioner Ganay
- Mathieu Carrière as Inspector Ménard
- Stefania Sandrelli as Sylvia Leopardi
- Vadim Glowna as Inspector Acadie
- Claude Bertrand as Merchant of Pigs
- Serge Marquand as "The Red"

== Production ==
For his second film after France société anonyme, which a commercially unsuccessful, director Alain Corneau said to himself that he had to ask "What is that [I] really like about cinema?" and said that he loved film noir by Fritz Lang, Don Siegel and American b-movies and wanted to make a detective film. Corneau submitted his idea to producer Albina de Boisrouvray that was part based on a personal memory of his youth and part on Kenneth Fearing's novel The Big Clock. The producer suggested he teamup with playight and poet Daniel Boulganger. The film was shot and set in Orléans.

Police Python 357 was a international co-production between France and West Germany. It was 70% funded by the Paris based Albina Productions and 30% funded by the Munich based TIT Film-produktion.

== Release ==
Police Python 357 was released in France on March 31, 1976. The authors of French Thrillers of the 1970s: Volume I, Crime Films (2026) described it as being successful at the French box office, with over 1,464,000 spectators in France.

It was released in West Germany on September 9, 1976 as Im tödlichen Kreis. It was released in Los Angeles' international film festival; the Filmex Film Festival; as Police Python 357 on March 19, 1977. It was released in Santa Cruz on December 21, 1978 as Police Python while in Miami in December 21, 1979, it was re-titled The Case Against Ferro.

== Reception ==
Police Python 357 won a César Award for Best Editing.
