= Kenneth Fearing =

American poet and novelist (1902–1961)

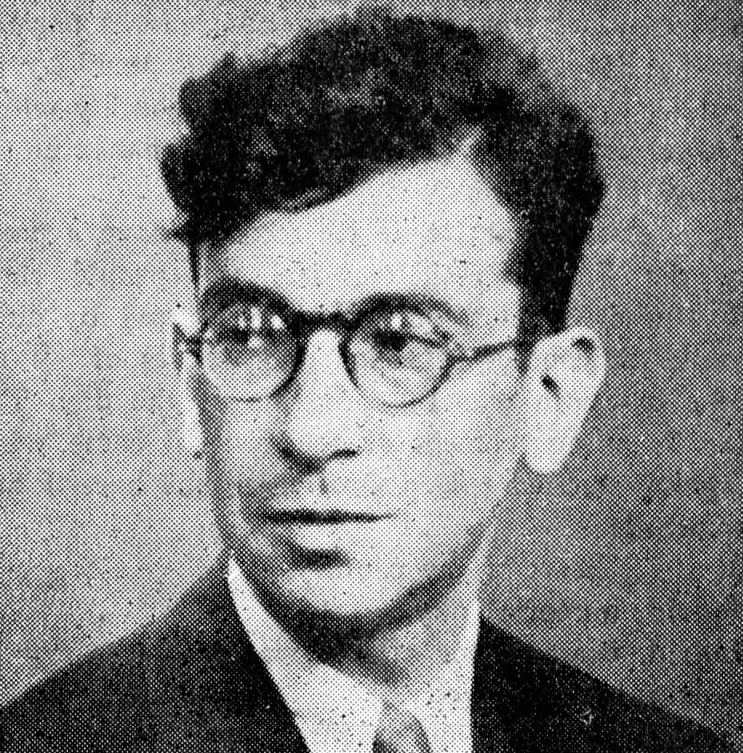
- Fearing c. 1939
- Born: July 28, 1902; Oak Park, Illinois, U.S.
- Died: June 26, 1961 (aged 58); New York City, U.S.
- Occupations: Poet, novelist

Kenneth Flexner Fearing (July 28, 1902 – June 26, 1961) was an American poet and novelist. A major poet of the Depression era, he addressed the shallowness and consumerism of American society as he saw it, often by ironically adapting the language of commerce and media. Critics have associated him with the American Left to varying degrees; his poetry belongs to the American proletarian poetry movement, but is rarely overtly political. Fearing published six original collections of poetry between 1929 and 1956. He wrote his best-known poems during the late 1920s and 1930s.

He moved from Illinois to New York City in 1924, and spent the rest of his life there. He supported himself by writing pulp fiction, often under pseudonyms. Around 1939 he began to write novels and wrote less poetry. His seven novels are mystery and thriller stories with some unconventional characteristics. They often feature many characters who are given one or more chapters from their point of view, and in a few later novels he used fictional newspaper articles and radio transcripts to further the narrative. His most famous novel, The Big Clock, has remained in print since its 1946 publication and was adapted for film.

== Personal biography ==
Fearing was born in Oak Park, Illinois, to a successful family: his father was Harry Lester Fearing (d. 1940), a successful Chicago attorney and descendant of the family of Calvin Coolidge. His mother Olive Flexner Fearing was of Jewish descent and a cousin of the educator Abraham Flexner. His parents divorced when he was a year old, and they each had custody of him six months of the year. He was raised mainly by his aunt, Eva Fearing Scholl, in the other half of a duplex that the Fearings owned and lived in. He had a half-sister Ethel (b. 1916) and a half-brother Ralph (b. 1918). Fearing went to school at Oak Park and River Forest High School, where he was voted "wittiest boy and class pessimist". He was the editor of the student newspaper, a position previously held by Ernest Hemingway. He studied English at the University of Illinois at Urbana–Champaign (1920–1922) and the University of Wisconsin (1922–1924). At the latter, he became editor-in-chief of the school's literary magazine, but was forced to resign in part for his acceptance of Modernist writing and other controversial material. He left without graduating, being one class short of a degree. In 1938 the University of Wisconsin awarded him the degree in absentia; presumably the school wanted to recognize his fame.

As a young man Fearing was thin, with dark hair and skin, and liked to wear dark suits. His voice was low and lispy. He had a "little-boy appeal", with messy hair and habits, horn-rimmed glasses, and an immature disposition—some of which may be seen in Alice Neel's oil portrait, painted in 1935, which is now at the Museum of Modern Art in New York. The portrait includes some references to Fearing's poetry and shows a small skeleton in his chest, grasping his heart and pouring blood from it; Neel commented that "He really sympathized with humanity ... His heart bled for the grief of the world." After his death, according to Robert M. Ryley, friends remembered "his charm, his eloquence, his almost courtly manners, his prickly independence, his not-quite-hidden vulnerability and innocence—but mostly they would remember his gloomy, sardonic skepticism".

During the late 1920s he had a romantic relationship with the writer and activist Margery Latimer, whom he met at Wisconsin. (Latimer's roman à clef This Is My Body includes a character based on Fearing.) Fearing cheated on Latimer and never proposed to her; she rejected his later attempt to renew their relationship. In 1931, he met Rachel Meltzer, a nurse by training and a medical social worker. Fearing was poor at expressing affection in person (if not in his letters) and less interested in marriage than Meltzer. She later said of her husband, "Kenneth spent his whole life hiding his inner self from other people"; "[he] needed someone to take care of him." They were married on April 26, 1933, and their son, Bruce Fearing, was born on July 19, 1935. The family soon travelled to Europe for nine months thanks to the $2,500 that came with Kenneth's 1935 Guggenheim Fellowship. Partly due to Fearing's growing alcoholism, he and Rachel divorced in 1941, with Rachel having custody of their son.

He stayed at the Yaddo artists' retreat for the first time in 1938 and returned often. At Yaddo he began a relationship with the painter Nan Lurie and they married on June 18, 1945. In this period his drinking became dangerous to his health, which scared him into temperance. Nan found him duller as a result, and their relationship suffered. They separated in 1952. This was his last marriage.

Fearing lacked money for much of his life (the period following his most successful novel was the exception). In New York, he received a monthly allowance from his mother until 1935, when she decided that her son should bear full responsibility for his new child. His mother had been skeptical of his choice of writing career. He also relied on gifts from his father and loans from Latimer in those years. He held few full-time jobs for more than a few months, despite claiming, apparently falsely, to have worked as a salesman, a journalist, and even a lumberjack in press materials. In the 1950s, he worked for the "Books" section of Newsweek magazine (1952–1954), and, during his single longest period of employment, he developed press material and annual reports for the Muscular Dystrophy Association of America (1955–1958). Still, he lived in poverty in the 1950s, and had smoked and drank heavily for most of his life, which seriously affected his health in his last years. In early 1961, he felt a sharp pain in his back that worsened through June, when his son Bruce moved in to care for him. They went to Lenox Hill Hospital on June 21, and five days later Fearing died of a melanoma of his left chest and pleural cavity. He is buried at Forest Home Cemetery in Forest Park, Illinois.

== Literary career ==
In December 1924, Fearing moved to New York City, joining Latimer, where he pursued a writing career. His friend the poet Horace Gregory noted that his early writing was not particularly successful, but Fearing was particularly determined to make a living in writing. His early work was commercial, including stories for pulp magazines, and he often wrote under pseudonyms. He wrote sex-pulp novels at half a cent a word, which were published under the pseudonym Kirk Wolff. Meanwhile, he searched for editors who would publish his poetry.

Fearing told a writers' convention in 1948 that "Literature is a means for crystallizing the myths under which society lives." His poetic influences included Walt Whitman, who he said was "the first writer to create a technique indigenous to the whole of this country's outlook", and François Villon, John Keats, and Edwin Arlington Robinson. He enjoyed Maurice Ravel and the painter George Grosz. His early poems were published in magazines such as Poetry, Scribner's, The New Yorker, the New Masses, Free Verse, Voices, and The Menorah Journal. About 44 of his poems were published before his first book of poetry came out. He was involved in the formation of the League of American Writers in 1935 and worked for its national council in the first year. He participated in the Federal Writers' Project during the Depression, and in 1939 he taught at the New York Writers School.

=== Poetry ===
Fearing's first book of poetry, Angel Arms (1929), was dedicated to Margery Latimer and had an introduction by Edward Dahlberg. The next book, Poems (1935), was a success and won him the first of two Guggenheim Fellowships (the fellowship was renewed in 1939). These two volumes contain some of his best-known poems, such as "Jack Knuckles Falters", "1935", "X Minus X", and "Dirge".

He published five original poetry collections; the remaining three are Dead Reckoning: A Book of Poetry (1938), Afternoon of a Pawnbroker and Other Poems (1943), and Stranger at Coney Island and Other Poems (1948). While his early poetry was well received, critics began to find his work repetitive in the 1940s. He was first anthologized in Collected Poems of Kenneth Fearing (1940). Fearing was most productive, and his future most bright, between 1938 and 1943, when he published a book of poetry or a novel each year. Even then, his royalties during this period were minimal, and only exceeded the publisher's advance on two occasions (the Collected Poems and the novel The Hospital). Despite the fame, he remained dependent on his wife Rachel's income.

==== Poetic themes and style ====
His poetry is concerned with "a society that was morally bankrupt and ... sapped by the economic and political maneuvers necessary to support the American ideal of 'getting ahead'". The characters in many of his poems are "types", and the effects of commerce and consumerism on the psyche are presented as if typical to everyone. The narrator is often superficially dispassionate, an ironic surveyor of the scene, but may reveal anger in the form of "sarcasm, contemptuous reductiveness, caricature, cartoony distortion, mocking hyperbole".

In "Dirge" (Poems), a successful "executive type" eventually loses his status via setbacks—"nevertheless, they shut off his gas; nevertheless, the / bank foreclosed; nevertheless, the landlord called"—and dies by suicide. The poem ironically intersperses comic-book language in its otherwise emotionless recounting: "And wow he died as wow he lived, / going whop to the office and blooie home to sleep and / biff got married and bam had children and oof got fired, / zowie did he live and zowie did he die". This effect, according to Nathaniel Mills, "indicates the manner in which mass culture works to deaden the sensory reality of pain ... For the reader, the aesthetic response of disorientation, unexpected excitement, or shock prompts a critical reflection: what sort of cultural and political formation could cheapen experience to the extent of rendering an obituary as 'zowie did he live and zowie did he die?'"

The language of mass media similarly intrudes in "Jack Knuckles Falters" (1926), in which a war veteran has been sentenced to death for murder. In his final words, he struggles with his competing needs to proclaim his innocence and meet his death with "dignity". Newspaper headlines that cover his execution interrupt each stanza and undermine his speech: "HAS LITTLE TO SAY ... THANKS WARDEN FOR KINDNESS ... STAGGERS WHEN HE SEES ELECTRIC CHAIR ... WILL RUMANIAN PRINCE WED AGAIN?" They convey nothing of his personal struggle but rather satisfy the public's need for a simple narrative in which a "criminal" is punished. The headline has moved on to another topic as the man proclaims his innocence. According to the poet Mark Halliday, "Fearing in 1926 (before television, before the Internet) is not calling for some practical redesigning of news delivery; he is asking his reader to think about the psychological effect of the simultaneous availability of countless bits of information, all formatted for quick-snack consumption."

Fearing commonly uses a particular syntax, which Halliday describes as an "anaphoric elaboration of a subordinate clause that waits in limbo for its controlling statement to arrive". This delay can be "a way of representing a life which people mostly can't shape for themselves, a world of people who can't be the agents of their experience and mostly live subordinated to great mysterious forces". The first two stanzas of "X Minus X" (from Poems) illustrate this style:

Even when your friend, the radio, is still; even when her
dream, the magazine, is finished; even when his life,
the ticker, is silent; even when their destiny, the
boulevard, is bare;
and after that paradise, the dancehall, is closed; after that
theater, the clinic, is dark,

Still there will be your desire, and her desire, and his
desire, and their desire,
your laughter, their laughter,
your curse and his curse, her reward and their reward,
their dismay and his dismay and her dismay and yours— [...]

=== Fiction ===
As the critical reception of his poetry declined into the 1940s—Halliday suggests that Fearing "seems to have felt increasingly jaded and skeptical about poetry's chance to participate in public life"—Fearing turned to novels. Between 1939 and 1960 he wrote seven mystery or "thriller" novels, although their formal qualities defy simple genre categorization. The most significant are The Hospital (1939), Dagger of the Mind (1941), Clark Gifford's Body (1942), and The Big Clock (1946).

Fearing was well known in 1939, and his first novel, The Hospital, quickly sold six thousand copies. A power outage at a hospital, caused by a drunk janitor, is the central event around which numerous characters' lives are portrayed. Each chapter is devoted to one character's point of view, a style common to all of Fearing's novels. The novel was criticized for the large number of characters and their lack of depth, a complaint that continued throughout Fearing's fiction career. Critics, however, praised its crisp prose style—one called it a "staccato prose poem"—and its portrayal of lower-class characters like the janitor. Dagger of the Mind (1941) is a psychological thriller in which there is a murder at an art colony. The creation of suspense from states of mind (via interior monologue) rather than physical violence was a departure from most novels of its type. Clark Gifford's Body (1942) recounts a revolution in an unnamed country that begins with the title character's attack on a radio station. It has more than twenty characters, moves back and forth in time, and inserts contradictory radio and newspaper accounts of events. The novel's experimental aspects and pessimism were not met well by readers.

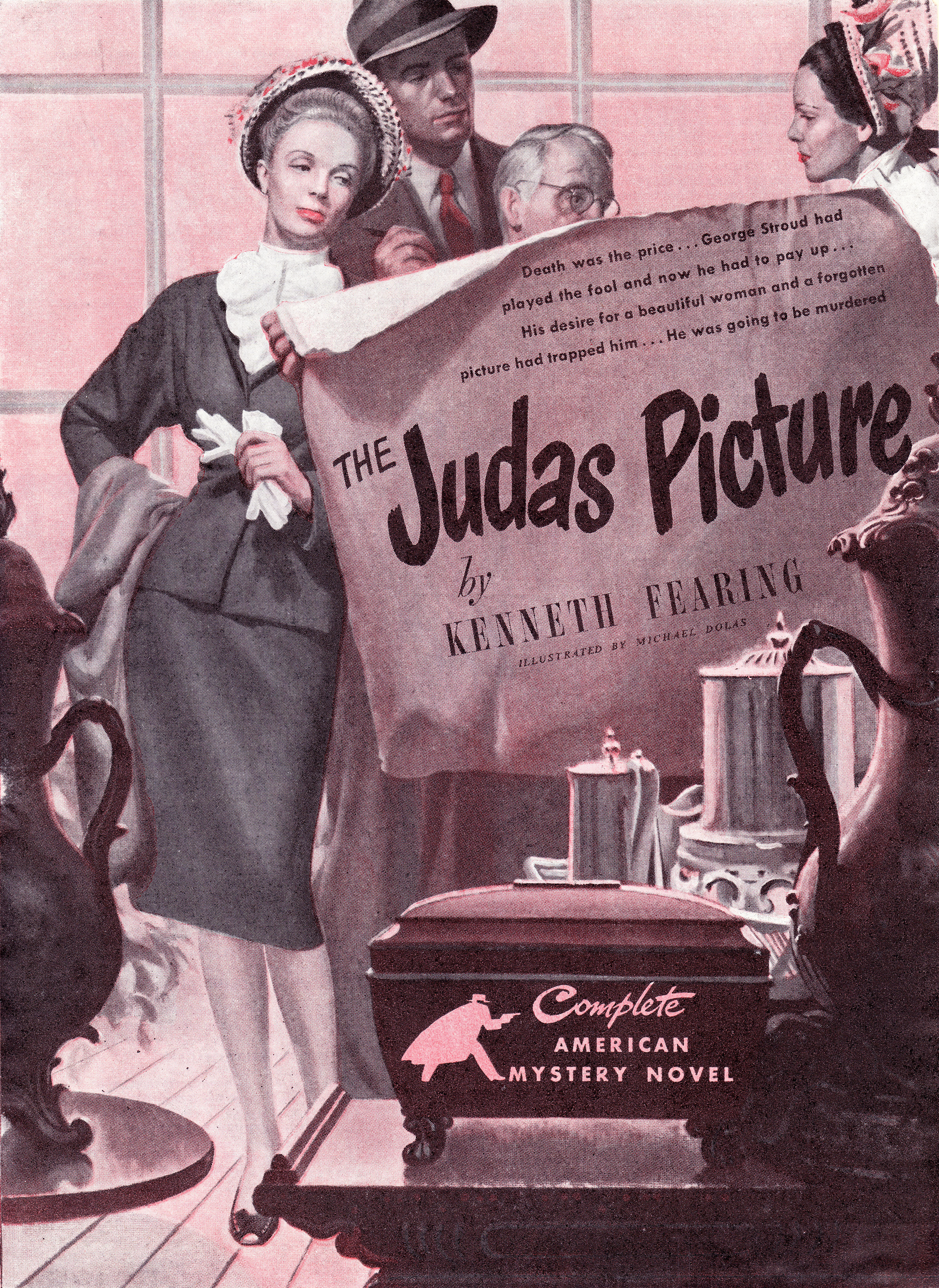
The Big Clock first appeared in an abridged form in The American Magazine as "The Judas Picture" (October 1946)

He worked for 14 months on his most well-known novel, The Big Clock (1946), whose protagonist, an editor for a crime magazine, is put in charge of a murder investigation by his boss—but both men had had a relationship with the murdered woman. The novel was more successful than his prior efforts artistically and commercially, with an engaging plot and more character depth. Alan M. Wald, an historian of the American Left, calls it "a psychosexual roman noir stressing the sinister effect of market segmentation in the publishing industry". It was critically well-received, and was popular enough that a Bantam paperback and an Armed Services Edition soon followed. It remains in print. The novel was developed into a film of the same name in 1948, and again in 1987 (No Way Out). The novel earned Fearing $60,000 from republication and film rights. His financial success was short-lived, as income from the novel dried up due to the unfavorable contracts that he had negotiated himself.

Wald summarizes the "frightening and fragmented hollowness" that Fearing saw in post-war US society and depicted in The Big Clock:

The menacing ambience of dislocation that permeates The Big Clock is structurally and symbolically rendered as industrial capitalism, a socioeconomic order in which the avenues of communication, especially publishing and the airwaves, are evolving into a science of planned manipulation designed to ensure profitability. Well-paid deceivers, together with the naively deceived, are imprisoned as cogs in the apparatus of private enterprise's modern institutions. ... The genius of The Big Clock is its previsioning of the manifold mythological dimensions of a "Consumer's Republic" that would typify the era.

In Loneliest Girl in the World (1951), an audio recording and storage device named "Mikki" is at the center of a mystery. Ellen Vaughn, the daughter of its inventor, uses the machine's "463,635 hours of recorded speeches, music, and business transactions" to determine the circumstances of her father's death. She finds a recording in which her father and his brother argue about the best way to exploit "Mikki", which Ellen ultimately destroys with a gun. The story is unusual in that the mystery is resolved with retrieved information rather than "detection".

The Crozart Story (1960) is about the heads of two rival public relations firms. Fearing has one PR head explain how he shaped public opinion: "The fantasies we were adroitly joining and fashioning into loaded rumors, those gossamer rumors we were transmuting into triggered press releases, those childlike releases we were everywhere implementing with public degradation, internal exile, imprisonment, those incandescent anxieties we were molding and hardening into death's-head taboos—all these components of the commando raids we were mounting for the world's richest haul consisted of words, basically, only words." The novel was abstract and lacking in plot, and its reception was poor. It did not earn enough to pay Fearing's advance. Critics state that Fearing's two last novels, particularly The Crozart Story, are more like unfinished sketches in places, and are suggestive of his declining motivation to write, his declining health due to alcoholism, or both.

=== Politics ===
Accounts vary as to Fearing's degree of association with Marxism and the American Left. Marxists courted him and suggested that he contribute to periodicals like the New Masses, which he did, beginning in 1926, and he was a contributing editor there from 1930 to 1933. He was a founding member of the John Reed Club in 1929, where he was on the editorial board of the communist Partisan Review; he is commonly included among its cofounders after the magazine repositioned itself as anti-Stalinist. He put his name to various pro-Soviet declarations from 1931 through to the 1939 "Open Letter of the 400", which defended Stalin's regime.

Yet Fearing's poems were almost never overtly political, and his associates often found him uncommitted to communism. He told the Daily Worker in 1938, "I've not tried deliberately to be Marxist in my poetry ... Marxism is valuable in literature only to the extent that the writer assimilates it. Consequently its principles become part of a writer's background, the way he thinks and feels and interprets it." Fearing's family maintained that "politics was never an important part of his life". His son Bruce said that his father "used a leftist political milieu to get his poetry published; he didn't believe in politics, he believed in poetry". As a Jew, a pacifist, and an anti-fascist, Fearing was uncomfortable with the American Communist Party's support of the Hitler-Stalin pact in 1939. (As a child, Fearing witnessed the "reflexive anti-semitism" of his father towards his wife's family.) The Molotov–Ribbentrop Pact prompted him to write a poem, "Pact", which was published in the New Yorker that year and contained hints to his allies that he was breaking rank. Wald writes that Fearing had "a mistrust of all political premises and a disbelief in all ameliorative options, [which] ran contrary to any connection with a large organization that demanded ideological conformity and an activist commitment". In the era of McCarthyism his political associations were sufficient for him to be interviewed by the FBI and called before the House Un-American Activities Committee. The FBI reported that "[Fearing said] he had become a 'fellow traveler' in 1933, and that prior to that time he had not been very interested in the meetings of the John Reed Club due to the fact that he was not interested in the politics discussed at all the meetings." Before the Committee in 1950, when asked if he was a member of the Communist Party, Fearing replied, "Not yet."

== Legacy ==
The literary critic Macha Rosenthal called Fearing "the chief poet of the American Depression". He influenced the Beat poets, such as Allen Ginsberg. Alan Filreis writes that Fearing's "demotic, chatty, antic, digressive style made Ginsberg possible", and Fearing's contemporary Marya Zaturenska said of Ginsberg, "isn't 3/4 of him straight out of Kenneth Fearing?"

Since Fearing's death, critics have offered more positive appraisals of his later poetry. In a 1970 article on the "Dynamo" school of poets, Estelle Novak wrote, "Fearing's true appeal as a revolutionary poet was his ability to combine realistic description and political comment in the form of a readable poem that lost nothing of its quality as poem while it gained in propaganda value." By the 1990s there was a "minor revival", with the National Poetry Foundation's publication of Kenneth Fearing Complete Poems in 1994, and the poet Mark Halliday published an essay, "Damned Good Poet: Kenneth Fearing" (2001), which included an analysis of the poet's themes. A selection of Fearing's poems has been published as part of the Library of America's American Poets Project.

== Bibliography ==
=== Poetry ===
- Angel Arms, Coward McCann (New York, NY), 1929.
- Poems, Dynamo (New York, NY), 1935.
- Dead Reckoning: A Book of Poetry, Random House (New York, NY), 1938.
- Collected Poems of Kenneth Fearing, Random House, 1940.
- Afternoon of a Pawnbroker and Other Poems, Harcourt (New York City), 1943.
- Stranger at Coney Island and Other Poems, Harcourt, 1948.
- New and Selected Poems, Indiana University Press (Bloomington), 1956.
- Complete Poems, ed. Robert M. Ryley, National Poetry Foundation (Orono, Maine), 1994.

=== Novels ===
- The Hospital, Random House, 1939.
- Dagger of the Mind, Random House, 1941, as Cry Killer!, Avon (New York, NY), 1958.
- Clark Gifford's Body, Random House, 1942.
- The Big Clock, Harcourt, 1946, as No Way Out, Perennial (New York, NY), 1980. New York : New York Review Books, 2006, introduction by Nicholas Christopher, ISBN 978-1-59017-181-3; Die große Uhr : ein Klassiker des Noir-Thrillers, herausgegeben von Martin Compart; Übertragung ins Deutsche Jakob Vandenberg, Coesfeld : Elsinor, 2023, ISBN 978-3-942788-71-7
- (With Donald Friede and H. Bedford Jones under joint pseudonym Donald F. Bedford) John Barry, Creative Age Press (New York, NY), 1947.
- Loneliest Girl in the World, Harcourt, 1951, as The Sound of Murder, Spivak (New York, NY), 1952.
- The Generous Heart, Harcourt, 1954.
- The Crozart Story, Doubleday, 1960.

=== Essays ===
- "Reading, Writing, and the Rackets." New and Selected Poems. Bloomington: Indiana UP, 1956, ix–xxiv.
- "The Situation in American Writing: Seven Questions." Partisan Review, Summer 1939, 33–35.
