= Lens speed =

Maximum aperture diameter, or minimum f-number, of a photographic lens

A fast prime (fixed focal length) lens, the Canon 50mm f/1.4 (left), and a slower zoom lens, the Canon 18–55mm f/3.5–5.6 (right); this lens is faster at 18mm than it is at 55mm.

Lens speed is the maximum aperture diameter, or minimum f-number, of a photographic lens. A lens with a larger than average maximum aperture (that is, a smaller minimum f-number) is called a "fast lens" because it can achieve the same exposure as an average lens with a faster shutter speed. Conversely, a smaller maximum aperture (larger minimum f-number) is "slow" because it delivers less light intensity and requires a slower (longer) shutter speed.

A fast lens speed is desirable in taking pictures in dim light, for stability with long telephoto lenses, and for controlling depth of field and bokeh, especially in portrait photography, as well as for sports photography and photojournalism.

Lenses may also be referred to as being "faster" or "slower" than one another; so an f/3.5 lens can be described as faster than an f/5.6 despite f/3.5 not generally being considered "fast" outright. What is considered fast largely depends on focal length, image diameter (i.e. format covered, such as APS, full frame, medium format), and in the case of zoom lenses, zoom factor.

== Tradeoffs ==
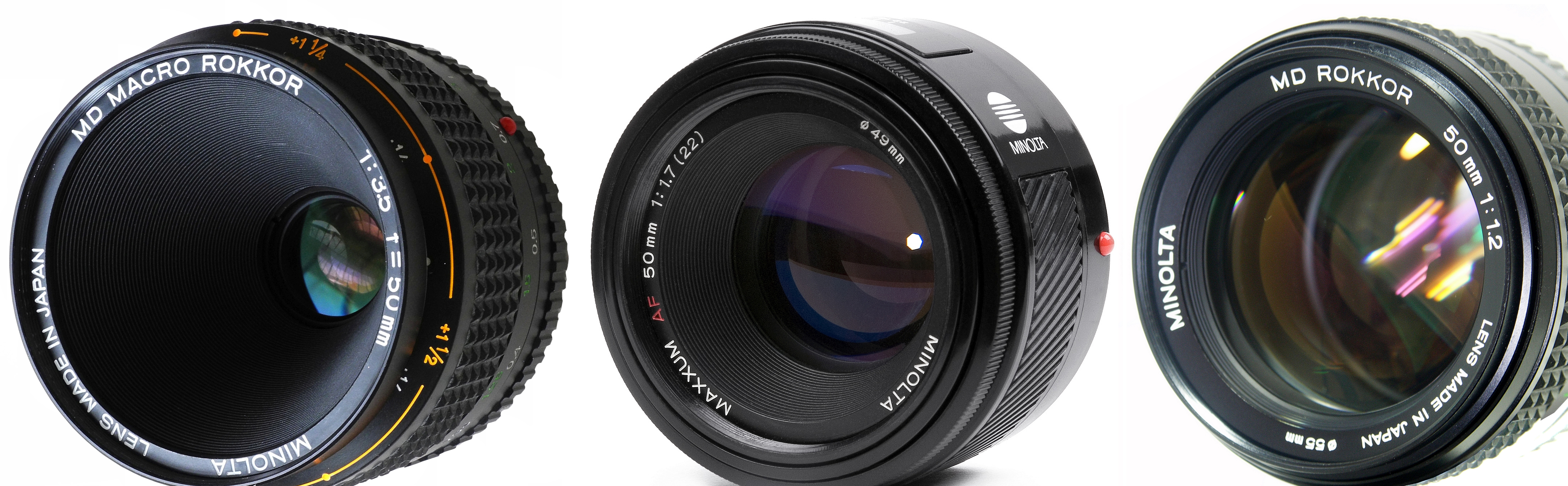
Three 50 mm prime lenses from Minolta with lens speed 3.5 (a macro photography lens, speed of less priority), 1.7 (standard), and 1.2 (large opening and high speed, typically expensive), showing the relation between entry lens diameter and lens speed.

Attaining maximum lens speed requires engineering tradeoffs, and as such, "prime" (fixed focal length) lenses are generally faster than zoom lenses.

With 35mm film cameras and full-frame digital cameras, the fastest lenses are typically in the "normal lens" range near 50mm; here, there are several relatively inexpensive high-quality fast lenses available. For example, the Canon EF 50mm f/1.8 II or Nikon AF Nikkor 50mm f/1.8D are very inexpensive, but quite fast and optically well-regarded. Old fast manual focus lenses, such as the Nikkor-S(C) or Nikkor AI-S 50mm f/1.4, or Canon's FD and M39 counterparts, were historically produced abundantly, and are thus sold relatively inexpensively on the used lens market.

Especially outside of the "normal" focal length, lens speed also tends to correlate with the price and/or quality of the lens. This is because lenses with larger maximum apertures require greater care with regard to design, precision of manufacture, special coatings and quality of glass. At wide apertures, spherical aberration becomes more significant and must be corrected. Thus, faster telephoto and wide-angle retrofocus designs tend to be much more expensive.

A telecompressor, also known as a speed booster, may be used to increase the speed of a lens with a corresponding reduction to its focal length. For example, the Metabones 0.58x BMPCC speed booster may be combined with a f/1.2 lens to produce f/0.74.

== Fast lenses ==
While the fastest lenses in general production in the 2010s were f/1.2 or f/1.4, the 2020s have seen several f/0.95 lenses, see below.

What is considered "fast" has evolved to lower f-numbers over the years, due to advances in lens design, optical manufacturing, quality of glass, optical coatings, and the move toward smaller imaging formats. For example, the 1911 Encyclopædia Britannica states that "...[Lenses] are also sometimes classified according to their rapidity, as expressed by their effective apertures, into extra rapid, with apertures larger than f/6; rapid, with apertures from f/6 to f/8; slow, with apertures less than f/11" whilst today, f/6 would be deemed at the rather slow end.

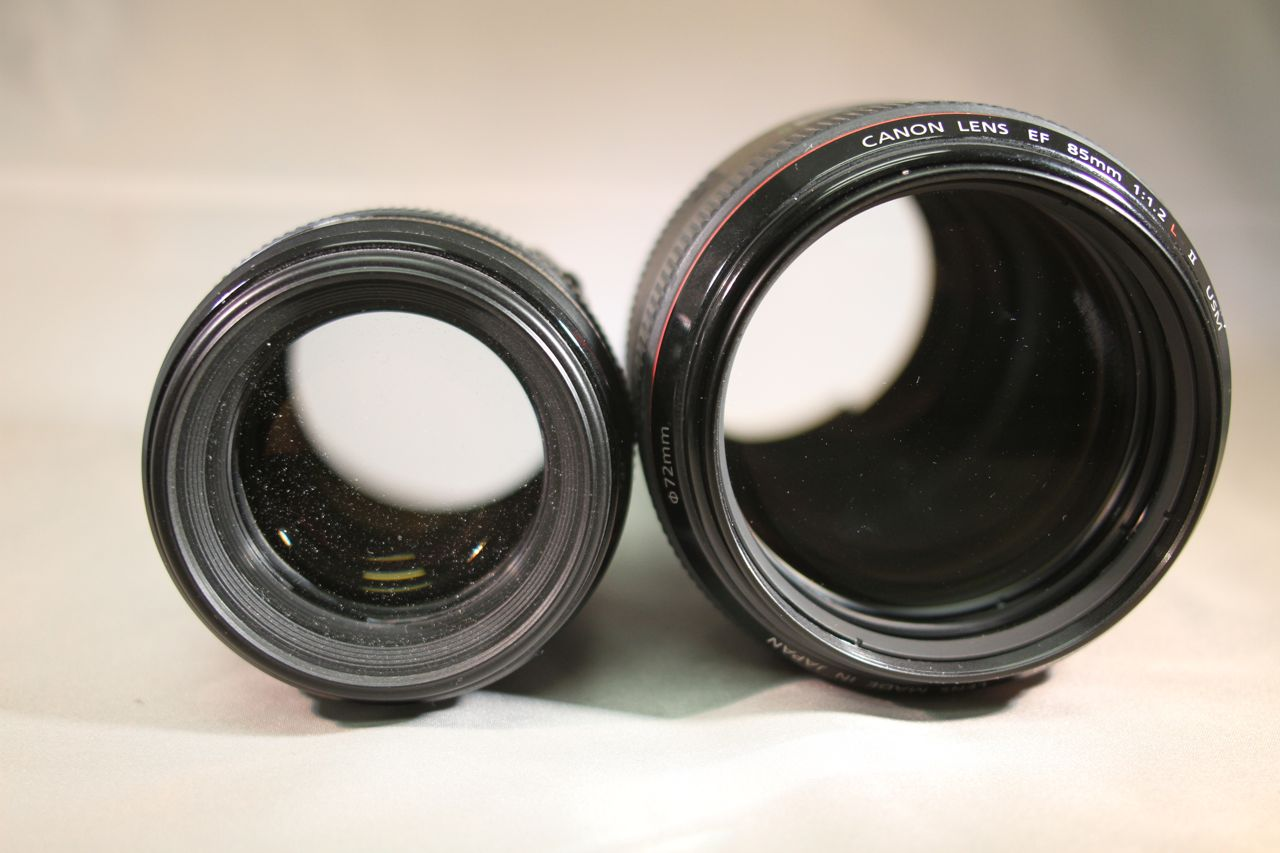
Canon 85mm f/1.8 and f/1.2 showing their large entrance pupils

For scale, note that f/0.5, f/0.7, f/1.0, f/1.4, and f/2.0 are each 1 f-stop apart (2× as fast), as an f-stop corresponds to a factor of the square root of 2, about 1.4. Thus around f/1.0, a change of 0.1 corresponds to about 1/4 of an f-stop (by linear approximation): f/1.0 is about 50% faster than f/1.2, which is about 50% faster than f/1.4.

As of 2017, Canon, Nikon, Pentax and Sony all make an autofocus 50mm f/1.4 lens. These are not unusual lenses and are relatively inexpensive. As of 2023, Canon also makes autofocus 50mm and 85mm f/1.2 lenses, while Nikon makes a manual focus 58mm f/0.95 lens and autofocus 50 and 85mm f/1.2 lenses; see Canon EF 50mm lenses and Canon EF 85mm lenses for details. Pentax makes a 50mm f/1.4 lens and 55mm f/1.4 lens for APS-C cameras; see Pentax lenses. Sony makes several 50mm f/1.4 lenses as well as a 50mm f/1.2.

The maximum exposure time for hand-held photography can be increased with an image stabilisation system. In 2014, Panasonic introduced the fastest lens with in-built stabilisation, the Leica Nocticron 42.5 mm f/1.2, which can even be operated with dual image stabilisation (Dual I.S.), provided that the camera body has an additional stabilising system at the image sensor.

In the mid 1960s, there was something of a fad for fast lenses among the major manufacturers. In 1966, in response to the trend, Carl Zeiss displayed a prop lens christened the Super-Q-Gigantar 40mm f/0.33 at photokina. Made from various parts found around the factory (the lenses came from a darkroom condenser enlarger), the claimed speed and focal lengths were purely nominal and it wasn't usable for photography.

=== Maximum possible speed ===
Theoretically, the smallest f-number is 0 (or numerical aperture of 1), corresponding to a lens with an infinite entrance pupil diameter. In practice, that cannot be reached due to mechanical constraints of the camera system (shutter clearance, mount diameter). Even for systems that can be designed without significant constraints on lens size and image plane distance (e.g. microscopy and photolithography systems), the cost of going beyond a numerical aperture of 0.95 (f/0.164) is usually prohibitive.

In SLR camera systems, typical mount diameters are in the range of 44–54 mm, with flange distances around 45 mm. This limits the maximum possible f-number to f/1.0 to f/1.2, with rather strong vignetting towards the edges of the image. Flange distances are significantly smaller for rangefinder and mirrorless cameras (even below 20 mm), theoretically enabling designs down to something like f/0.7 or even faster. The chance of seeing such lenses designed for use with 35mm ("full-frame") cameras, digital or film, in practice will be slim, since their cost and weight are likely not competitive with respect to equivalent imaging solutions employing larger sensors.

=== List of ultrafast lenses ===
Some of the fastest camera lenses in production as of 2021 were as follows:

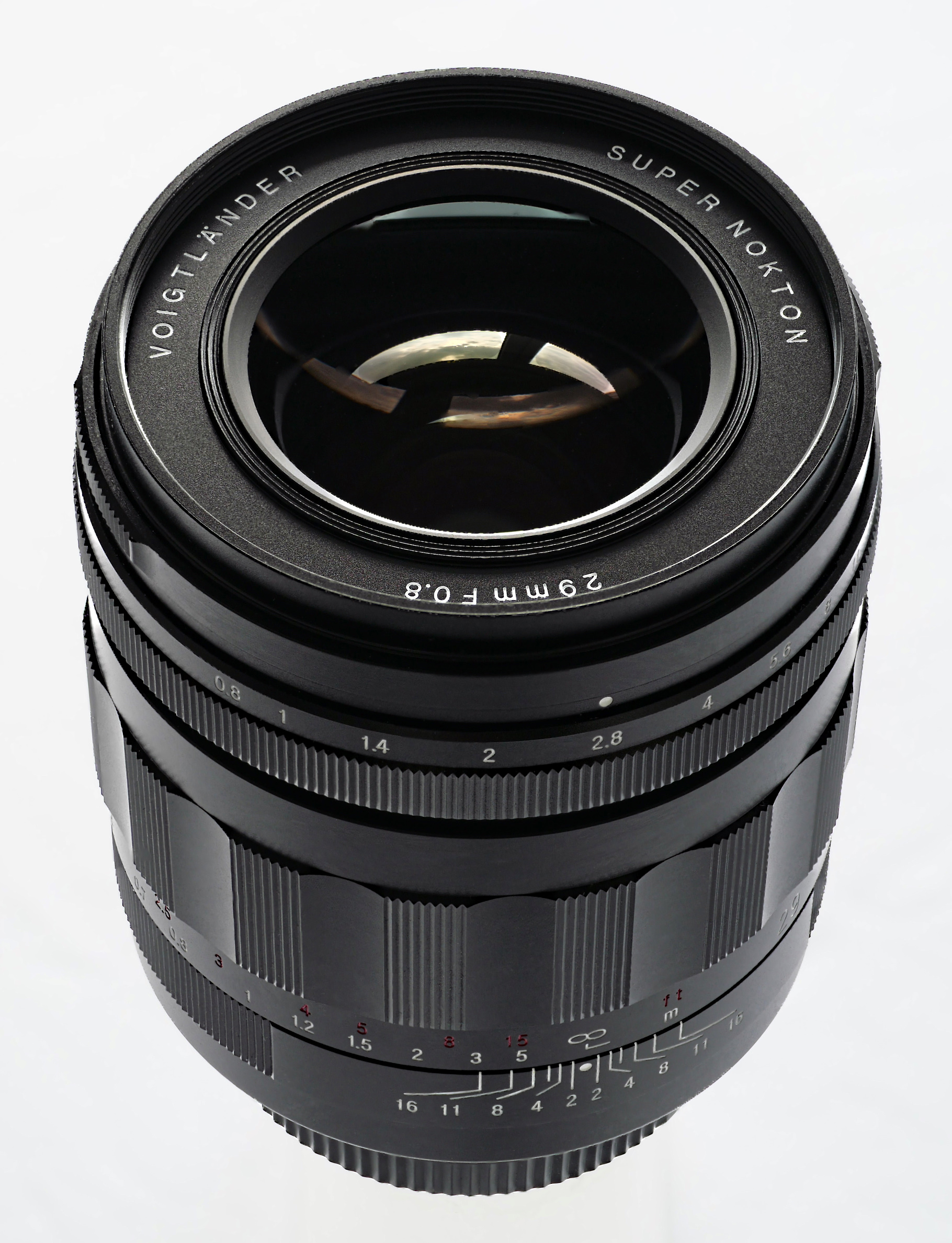
Cosina Voigtländer Super Nokton 29 mm / 0.8

- Scintica 50mm f/0.7 Newton FT-900 Bioluminescence & fluorescence imager
- Cosina Voigtländer Super Nokton 29mm f/0.8 Micro Four Thirds mount
- Cosina Voigtländer Nokton 10.5mm, 17.5mm, 25mm, 42.5mm, 60mm f/0.95 for Micro Four Thirds mount
- Vantage One T1.0 Cine lenses from 17.5mm to 120mm (Super35mm Spherical Primes)
- SLR Magic 25mm T/0.95
- SLR Magic 35mm T/0.95
- Laowa 18mm, 25mm, 33mm f/0.95 (T1.0) For Super35mm Frame sensor
- Laowa 28mm, 35mm, 45mm f/0.95 (T1.0) For Full Frame sensor
- Handevision Ibelux 40mm f/0.85 (made for Micro Four Thirds and various APS camera mounts, including Sony E-Mount and Fujifilm X-Mount)
- Fujinon 43mm f/0.85 VRF43LMD (used in LAS 3000 biomolecular Imager)
- Leica Noctilux-M 50mm f/0.95 ASPH (announced on September 15, 2008, then the fastest aspherical lens to have reached mass production; MSRP of £6290 or approximately US$10,000).
- Zhongyi Mitakon 50mm and 35mm f/0.95 in various optical versions and mounts, of which at least the 50mm for Leica M rangefinders has been found to in fact only be f/1.06!
- Nikon Noct-Nikkor Z 58mm f/0.95

The following lenses are no longer in production as of 2021:

- American Optical 81mm 3.259" f/0.38 Solid Schmidt Mirror lens (designed for aerial reconnaissance)
- GOI CV 20mm f/0.5 Mirror lens (2.9 mm image diameter, 1948; design and glass types used are well documented for anyone wanting to build their own
- Signal Corps Engineering 33mm f/0.6
- GOI Iskra-3 72mm f/0.65 Mirror lens
- Fujinon-IDEAX 125mm f/0.67 and/or f/0.85 (X-ray lens, two speeds quoted on front ring)
- Zeiss Planar 50mm f/0.7 (Limited 10-copies production for the NASA space program, later used on 35mm movie cameras by Stanley Kubrick for some candlelit scenes in Barry Lyndon)
- Tokyo Kogaku Similar 50mm f/0.7 (8 elements in 4 groups, limited production in 1944 for Japanese Army. In 1951, another three were produced, two of which were used on a South Pole expedition)
- Kinoptik Lynxar 60mm f/0.7 (Reproduction lens, usable but not optimised for photography)
- Wray 64mm f/0.71 (Reproduction lens, usable but not optimised for photography)
- LOMO 60mm f/0.75 (Reproduction lens, usable but not optimised for photography)
- Aerojet Delft Rayxar 105mm f/0.75 Full Frame aerial photography lens
- Aerojet Delft Rayxar 150mm f/0.75 Medium Format aerial photography lens
- Aerojet Delft Rayxar 250mm f/0.75 Large Format aerial photography lens
- Baker-Nunn camera 500mm f/0.75 twelve used for tracking satellites
- American Optical 43mm 1.715" f/0.8
- JML Optical 64mm f/0.85
- Leica Summar 75mm f/0.85 Reproduction lens, not for photography.
- Leica Leitz-IR 150mm f/0.85 Reproduction lens, not for photography.
- Farrand Super Farron 76mm f/0.87
- Farrand Super Farron 150mm f/0.87 Medium Format aerial photography lens
- Canon 50mm f/0.95 (made as a rangefinder-coupled version with proprietary external bayonet for Canon 7 rangefinders, and an uncoupled C-mount "TV" version)
- Kiev Рекорд-4 (Rekord-4) 52mm f/0.9 (rangefinder lens, remained a prototype despite better resolution than the Canon 50mmf/0.95 rangefinder lens)
- Nikon TV-Nikkor 35mm f/0.9 (Fastest Nikon lens ever made; TV lens in M39 lens mount, 12.6 mm diameter image circle)
- Noktor 50mm f/0.95 (C-mount lens converted for mirrorless cameras; the actual C-mount lens is still being made as D.O. Industries Kowa Navitron, JML, Tarcus; Elgeet Navitar, SLRMagic Hyperprime, Senko, Yakumo; Goyo; Ernitec Super)
- SLR Magic HyperPrime CINE and LM 50mm f/0.92 T0.95 (rangefinder lens, Erwin Puts measured it to be T1.12!Noctilux 0.95/50)
- Astro Berlin 52mm f/0.95 (Super-35 Cine lens)
- Leitz Perkin Elmer 4.5" 114mm f/0.95 T1 (aerial photography lens, 40mm image diameter, 1967)
- Pacific Optical 25mm f/1.0 (Medium Format 150° Fish-eye lens, 55 mm image diameter; only 3 copies were ever made: for the Canadian Government for aurora borealis research in the late 60s/early 70s. One of these lenses was used in the production of the IMAX movie Solarmax, one is presumed lost; the cost per piece was estimated at 250,000 USD)
- Leica Noctilux-M 50mm f/1.0 (Leica M mount, 1976; discontinued and replaced 2008 with a new Noctilux, see above)
- Canon EF 50mm f/1.0 L USM (for Canon EOS autofocus SLRs, announced 1987, released 1989, discontinued 2009)
- Panavision 50mm f/1.0 (Super-35 cine lens)
- Nikkor-O 50mm f/1.0 Prototype lens for Nikkor-S Rangefinder camera
- Leica ELCAN 90mm f/1.0
- Wild Heerbrugg Reconar 98mm f/1.0 Medium Format aerial photography lens
- Kollmorgen 153mm f/1.0
- Zeiss UR 250mm f/1.0
- Canon 8.5–25.5mm f/1.0 zoom lens (made 1975–1983 for the 310XL Super 8mm silent and sound camera series, the fastest zoom lens ever made for Super8, originally advertised as facilitating "shooting at candlelight" in combination with 160-ASA films.)

Apart from those already mentioned, many very fast lenses exist in C-mount (as used by 16mm film cameras, CCTV, medical & scientific imaging systems), including:

- Fujinon 50mm f/0.7
- Panasonic 6mm f/f0.75
- Canon 'TV-16' 25mm f/0.78
- Computar 8mm f/0.8 (6.4 x 4.8 mm image)
- VS Technology 25mm f/0.85
- VS Technology 50mm f/0.85
- Apollo 25mm f/0.85
- Ernitec 25mm f/0.85
- Fujinon 25mm f/0.85
- Tarcus 25mm f/0.85
- Kern Switar 18mm f/0.9 (built for NASA for the Apollo Moon landing)
- Fujinon YV2.7x2.9LR4A-SA 2.9-8mm f/0.95
- Ampex 'LE610 Television Lens' 25mm f/0.95
- Angénieux 25mm f/0.95 Type 'M1' and 'M2' (M1 was the original, more common, consumer-grade product, while M2 was aimed at the professional cine market, with better correction for aberrations and distortions)
- Angénieux 28mm f/0.95 Type 'M1' and 'M2' (for 16mm film)
- Angénieux 35mm f/0.95
- Angénieux 50mm f/0.95 Type 'M1' and 'M2'
- AstroScope 25mm f/0.95
- Avenir 25mm f/0.95
- Century 'Nighthawk' 25mm f/0.95
- Carl Meyer 25mm f/0.95
- Cinetar 25mm f/0.95
- Goyo Optical 17mm, 25mm, and 50mm f/0.95
- JML 25mm and 50mm f/0.95
- Navitar 25mm and 50mm f/0.95 (see also above entry to the Noktor)
- Navitron 25mm and 50mm f/0.95 (see also above entry to the Noktor)
- Schneider Kreuznach 'Xenon' 17mm, 25mm, and 50mm f/0.95
- Senko 25mm and 50mm f/0.95 (see also above entry to the Noktor)
- Soligor 'Super Elitar' 25mm f/0.95
- Som Berthiot 'Cinor' 25mm and 50mm f/0.95
- Tarcus 'I.T.V. Lens' 50mm f/0.95
- Precise Optics 50mm f/0.95
- Kowa 50mm f/0.95
- Yakumo 25mm and 50mm f/0.95
- Zeika 'Nominar' 25mm f/0.95
- Kaligar 'Nominar' 25mm f/0.95
- Dallmeyer 25mm f/0.99 (1930)
- Astro Berlin 25mm f/1.0
- Bausch & Lomb 29mm f/1.0
- Astro Berlin 'Tachonar' 35mm and 75mm f/1.0
- Carl Meyer Videostigmat 1.5" 38mm f/1.0
- RTH (Rank/Taylor Hobson) Monital 130mm f/1.0 made by SOPELEM in France, Super35mm cine lens

Very fast lenses in D-mount for use in (Super-)8mm film and video (Hi)8 cameras:

- Kern Switar 13mm f/0.9
- Cinetor 'TELE-PHOTO' 37.5mm f/1.0
- Walz 'TELEPHOTO' 37.5mm f/1.0
- Amitar 'Telephoto' 38.1mm f/1.0
- Rexer 'TELE' 38mm f/1.0
- Manon 'Telephoto' 37.5mm f/1.0

Very fast lenses used in X-ray machines:

- Canon X 60mm f/0.7
- Canon X 100mm f/0.7
- Zeiss R-Biotar 100mm f/0.73
- LOMO 100mm f/0.73
- Canon 50mm and 65mm f/0.75
- Leitz 50mm and 65mm f/0.75
- Astro-Berlin Tachon 65mm f/0.75
- De Oude Delft Rayxar 50mm, 65mm and 105mm, and allegedly 150mm f/0.75
- De Oude Delft Rayxar 90mm f/1.0
- Rodenstock XR-Heligon 42mm and 50mm f/0.75
- Rodenstock XR-Heligon 68mm f/1
- Kowa 42mm and 65mm f/0.75
- Carl Zeiss Jena 50mm f/0.77
- Kowa 55mm f/0.8
- Zeiss R-Biotar 125mm f/0.8
- Zeiss R-Biotar 55mm f/0.85
- Lenzar Optics 184.6mm f/0.9 (Photographic lens made by Lenzar Optics Corp., Riviera Beach FL, f/0.9–8)
- Kowa 33.5mm f/0.95
- Kowa 55mm f/1.0
- Rodenstock Heligon 68mm f/1.0
- Canon 65mm and 90mm f/1.0
- Fuji 90mm f/1.0
- Kowa 90mm f/1.0
