= Barry Lyndon =

1975 film by Stanley Kubrick

- Re-release poster by Jouineau Bourduge
- Directed by: Stanley Kubrick
- Screenplay by: Stanley Kubrick
- Based on: The Luck of Barry Lyndon by William Makepeace Thackeray
- Produced by: Stanley Kubrick
- Starring: Ryan O'Neal; Marisa Berenson; Patrick Magee; Hardy Kruger; Diana Körner; Gay Hamilton
- Cinematography: John Alcott
- Edited by: Tony Lawson
- Production companies: Hawk Films; Peregrine Productions; Warner Bros.
- Distributed by: Columbia-Warner Distributors (UK); Warner Bros. (US)
- Release dates: 11 December 1975 (Warner West End, premiere); 18 December 1975 (UK & US)
- Running time: 185 minutes
- Countries: United Kingdom; United States
- Language: English
- Budget: $11–12 million
- Box office: $20.3 million

Barry Lyndon is a 1975 epic historical drama film written, produced, and directed by Stanley Kubrick, based on the 1844 novel The Luck of Barry Lyndon by William Makepeace Thackeray. Narrated by Michael Hordern, and starring Ryan O'Neal, Marisa Berenson, Patrick Magee, Leonard Rossiter, and Hardy Krüger, the film recounts the early exploits and later unravelling of an 18th-century Irish rogue and gold digger who marries a rich widow in order to attempt to climb the social ladder and assume her late husband's aristocratic position.

Kubrick began production on Barry Lyndon after his 1971 film A Clockwork Orange. He had originally intended to direct a biopic on Napoleon, but lost his financing because of the commercial failure of the similar 1970 Dino De Laurentiis–produced Waterloo. Kubrick eventually directed Barry Lyndon, set partially during the Seven Years' War, utilising his research from the Napoleon project. Filming began in December 1973 and lasted roughly eight months, taking place in England, Ireland, and Germany.

The film's cinematography has been described as ground-breaking. Especially notable are the long double shots, usually ended with a slow backwards zoom, the scenes shot entirely in candlelight, and the settings based on William Hogarth paintings. The exteriors were filmed on location in England, Ireland, and Germany, with the interiors shot mainly in London. The production had problems related to logistics, weather, and politics (Kubrick feared that he might be an IRA hostage target).

Barry Lyndon won four Oscars at the 48th Academy Awards: Best Scoring: Original Song Score and Adaptation or Scoring: Adaptation, Best Costume Design, Best Art Direction, and Best Cinematography, while Kubrick himself was nominated for Best Picture, Best Director and Best Adapted Screenplay. Although some critics took issue with the film's slow pace and restrained emotion, its reputation, like that of many of Kubrick's works, has grown over time, and it is widely considered one of the greatest films of all time. In the 2022 Sight & Sound Greatest Films of All Time poll, Barry Lyndon placed 12th in the directors' poll and 45th in the critics' poll.

== Plot ==
=== Part I: "By What Means Redmond Barry Acquired the Style and Title of Barry Lyndon" ===
In 1750, in the Kingdom of Ireland, Redmond Barry's father is killed in a duel. Barry, of a genteel but impoverished Irish Protestant family, becomes infatuated with his cousin Nora Brady, and shoots her suitor, Army captain John Quin, in a duel. He flees but is robbed by highwaymen on his way to Dublin. Penniless, Barry enlists in the Army. Family friend Captain Grogan informs him that Quin is not dead: the duel was staged, Barry's bullet having been swapped for a plug of tow, so that Nora's family could get rid of Barry and improve their finances through her marriage to Quin.

Barry serves with his regiment in Germany during the Seven Years' War, but deserts after Grogan dies in combat against the French. Absconding with a lieutenant's horse and uniform, Barry has a brief affair with Frau Lieschen, a married German peasant woman. On his way to Bremen, he encounters Captain Potzdorf, who sees through his attempted deception and impresses him into the Prussian Army. Barry later saves Potzdorf's life and receives a commendation from Frederick the Great.

At the end of the war, Barry is recruited by Captain Potzdorf's uncle into the Prussian Ministry of Police. The Prussians suspect that the Chevalier de Balibari, an Austrian diplomat and professional gambler, is in fact an Irishman and a spy for Empress Maria Theresa, and assign Barry to become his manservant. An emotional Barry confides everything to the Chevalier and they become confederates. After they win an enormous sum from the Prince of Tübingen at cards, the Prince correctly accuses the Chevalier of cheating (though without proof), refuses to pay his debt, and demands satisfaction. To avoid a scandal, the Ministry of Police decides to quietly escort the Chevalier outside Prussian borders, which allows Barry, disguised as the Chevalier, to leave the country as well, the Chevalier himself having uneventfully crossed the border the night before.

Barry and the Chevalier travel across Europe, perpetrating similar gambling scams, with Barry forcing payment from debtors with sword duels. In Spa, he encounters the beautiful, wealthy, and visibly depressed Lady Lyndon. He seduces her, and goads her elderly husband Sir Charles Lyndon to death with verbal repartee.

This is followed by an intermission.

=== Part II: "Containing an Account of the Misfortunes and Disasters Which Befell Barry Lyndon" ===
In 1773, Barry marries Lady Lyndon, adds her last name to his and settles in England. The Countess bears Barry a son, Bryan Patrick, whom Barry spoils. The marriage is unhappy: Barry is openly unfaithful and squanders his wife's wealth while keeping her in seclusion. Lord Bullingdon, Lady Lyndon's son by Sir Charles, still grieves for his father and sees Barry as a rake who married his mother as a means to improve his standing and wealth. Barry responds with years of escalating emotional and physical abuse.

Barry's mother comes to live with him and warns him that if Lady Lyndon dies, Bullingdon will inherit everything. She advises her son to obtain a title. To this end, Barry cultivates the influential Earl of Wendover and spends even larger sums of Lady Lyndon's money to ingratiate himself with high society. Bullingdon, now a young adult, interrupts a society party Barry throws. He publicly accuses his stepfather of infidelity, abuse, and financial mismanagement, and announces that he will leave the Lyndon estate for as long as Barry remains there. Barry responds by attacking Bullingdon until they are physically separated by the party attendees. In the aftermath, Barry is ostracised by the British well-to-do and plunges further into financial ruin.

Barry arranges to give Bryan a full-grown horse for his ninth birthday. An impatient Bryan rides the horse unaccompanied and dies from complications following a riding accident. Barry sinks into alcoholism, while Lady Lyndon seeks religious counseling from clergyman Samuel Runt, who had been tutor to Bullingdon and Bryan and a longtime companion of Lady Lyndon. When Barry's mother dismisses Runt to keep her son from losing control, Lady Lyndon attempts suicide. Runt and Graham, the family's steward, write to Bullingdon, who returns to the estate and challenges his stepfather to a duel.

When the duel takes place, Bullingdon's first shot is an accidental misfire. Instead of exploiting his stepson's mistake, Barry deliberately fires into the ground. This gives Bullingdon grounds to claim satisfaction and end the duel, which he refuses. Bullingdon fires again, shooting Barry in the leg. This wound forces Barry to have an amputation below the knee. While Barry is recovering, Bullingdon takes control of the Lyndon estate. Through Graham, he reminds Barry that his credit is exhausted and offers him 500 guineas a year to leave Lady Lyndon, her estates, and England forever. Barry grudgingly accepts and resumes his former gambling profession, but without any real success. In December 1789, Lady Lyndon signs Barry's annuity cheque as her son looks on.

=== "Epilogue" ===
It was in the reign of George III that the aforesaid personages lived and quarreled; good or bad, handsome or ugly, rich or poor they are all equal now.

== Cast ==
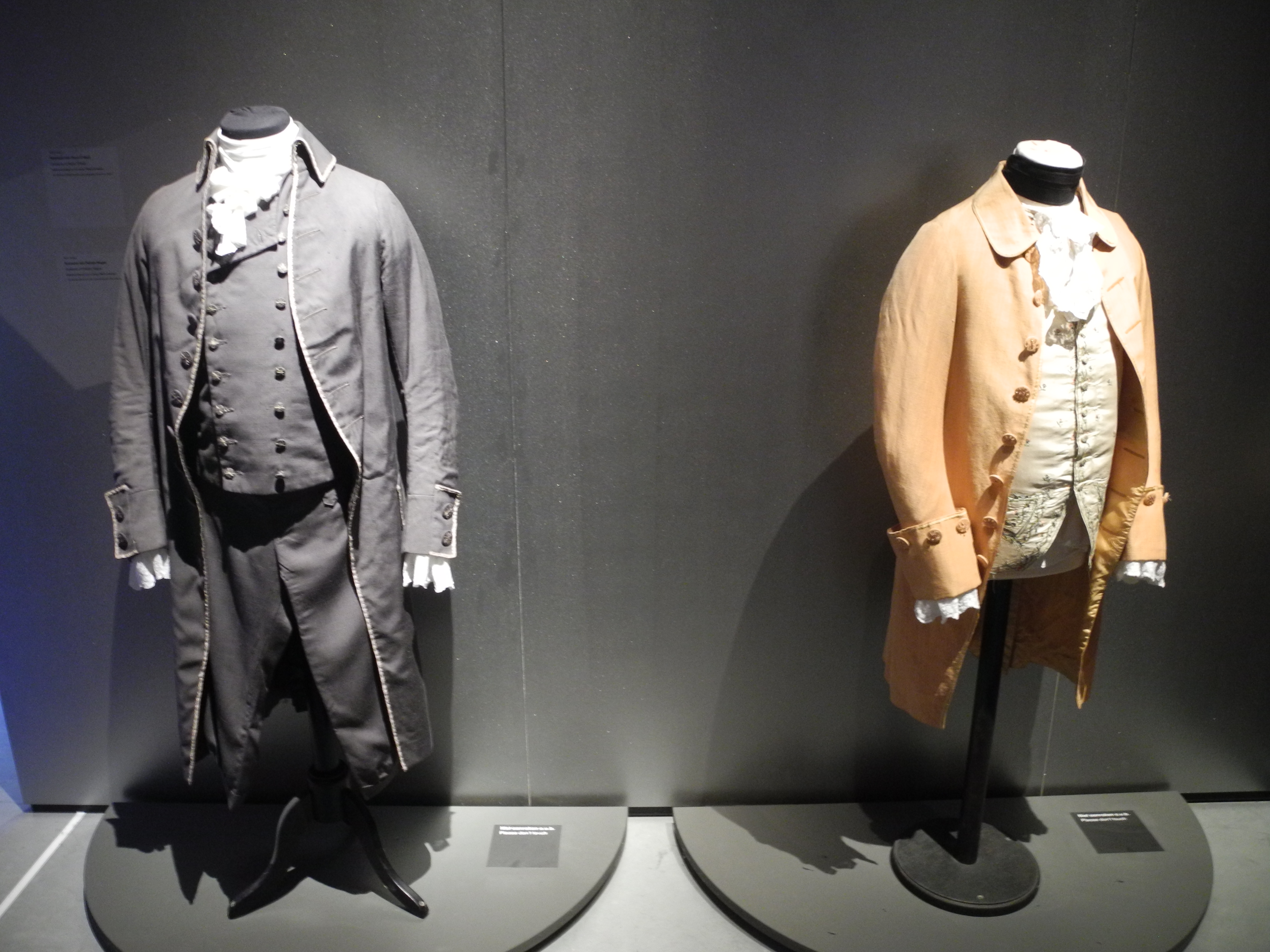
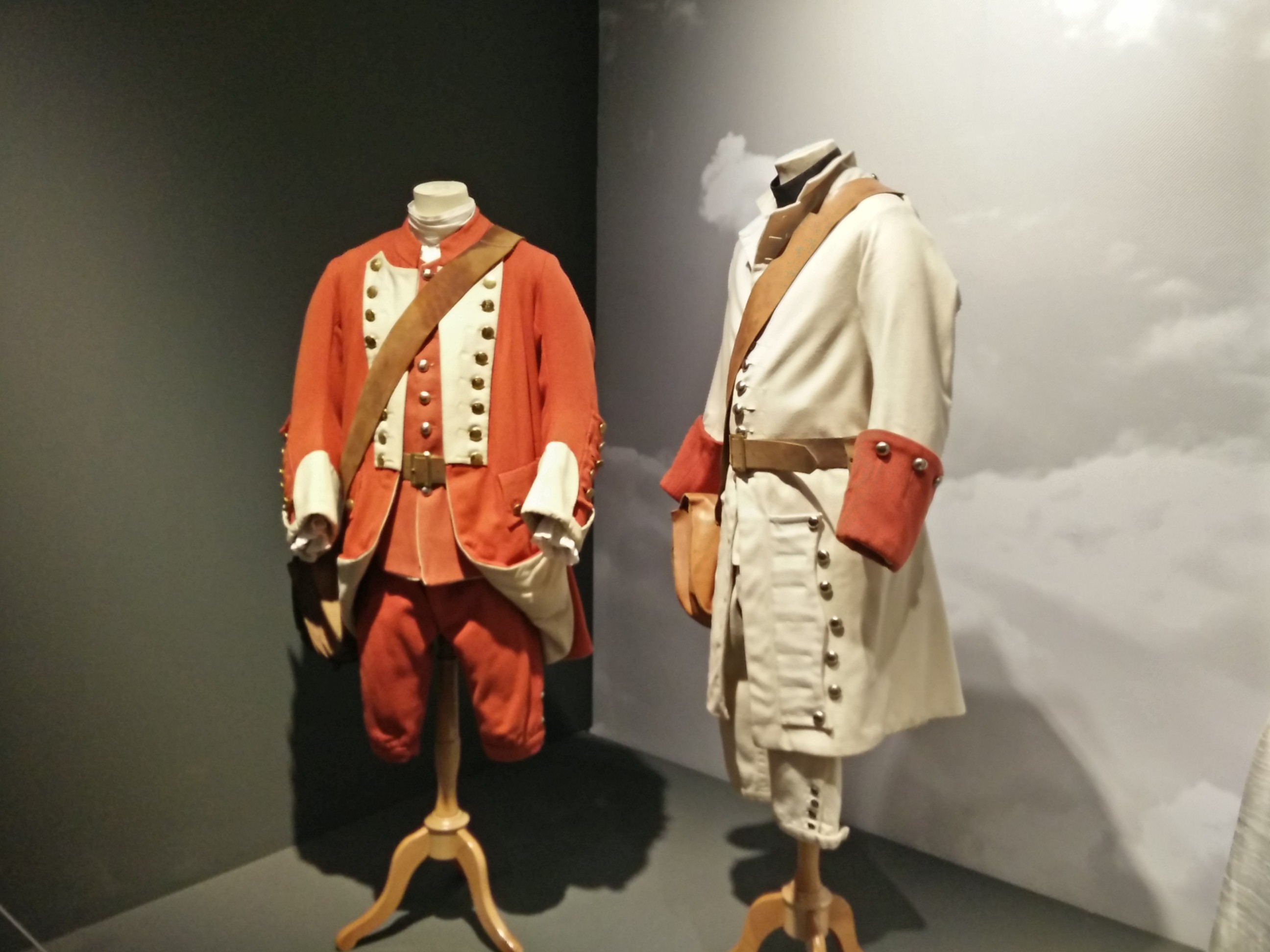
Costumes worn in Barry Lyndon
- Ryan O'Neal as Redmond Barry (later Redmond Barry Lyndon)
- Marisa Berenson as Lady Honoria Lyndon
- Patrick Magee as the Chevalier de Balibari
- Hardy Krüger as Captain Potzdorf
- Gay Hamilton as Nora Brady
- Godfrey Quigley as Captain Grogan
- Steven Berkoff as Lord Ludd
- Marie Kean as Belle, Barry's mother
- Murray Melvin as Reverend Samuel Runt
- Frank Middlemass as Sir Charles Reginald Lyndon
- Leon Vitali as adult Lord Bullingdon
  - Dominic Savage as young Bullingdon
- Leonard Rossiter as Captain John Quin
- André Morell as Lord Wendover
- Anthony Sharp as Lord Hallam
- Philip Stone as Graham
- David Morley as Bryan Patrick Lyndon
- Diana Koerner as Lieschen (German Girl)
- Arthur O'Sullivan as Captain Feeney
- Patrick Dawson as Seamus Feeney
- Jonathan Cecil as Lt Jonathan Fakenham
- Peter Cellier as Sir Richard Brevis
- Geoffrey Chater as Dr Broughton
- Wolf Kahler as Prinz von Tübingen
- Liam Redmond as Mr Brady
- Billy Boyle as Michael Brady
- Pat Laffan as Ulick Brady
- Roger Booth as King George III
- Ferdy Mayne as Colonel Bulow
- John Sharp as Doohan
- Pat Roach as Corporal Toole
- Hans Meyer as Joseph
- Frederick Schiller as Von Potzdorf
- George Sewell as Barry's Second
- Harry Towb as Innkeeper
- Michael Hordern as the voice of the narrator

=== Casting notes ===
Critic Tim Robey suggests that the film "makes you realise that the most undervalued aspect of Kubrick's genius could well be his way with actors." He adds that the supporting cast is a "glittering procession of cameos, not from star names but from vital character players."

Leon Vitali, who played the older Lord Bullingdon, later became Kubrick's personal assistant, working as the casting director on his following films and supervising film-to-video transfers. Their relationship lasted until Kubrick's death. The film's cinematographer, John Alcott, appears at the men's club in the non-speaking role of the man asleep in a chair near the title character when Lord Bullingdon challenges Barry to a duel. Kubrick's daughter Vivian also appears (in an uncredited role) as a guest at Bryan's birthday party.

Other Kubrick featured regulars were Leonard Rossiter (2001: A Space Odyssey), Steven Berkoff, Patrick Magee, Godfrey Quigley, Anthony Sharp, and Philip Stone (A Clockwork Orange). Stone went on to feature in The Shining.

== Thematic analysis ==
A main theme explored in Barry Lyndon is one of fate and destiny. Barry is pushed through life by a series of key events, some of which seem unavoidable. As critic Roger Ebert says, "He is a man to whom things happen." He declines to eat with the highwayman Captain Feeney, where he would most likely have been robbed, but is robbed anyway farther down the road. The narrator repeatedly emphasises the role of fate as he announces events before they unfold on screen, like Bryan's death and Bullingdon seeking satisfaction. This theme of fate is also developed in the recurring motif of the painting. Just like the events featured in the paintings, Barry is participating in events which always were.

Another major theme is between father and son. Barry lost his father at a young age and throughout the film he seeks and attaches himself to father-figures. Examples include his uncle, Grogan, and the Chevalier. When given the chance to be a father, Barry loves his son to the point of spoiling him. This contrasts with his role as stepfather to Lord Bullingdon, whom he disregards and punishes.

== Production ==
=== Development ===
After completing post production on 2001: A Space Odyssey, Kubrick resumed planning a film about Napoleon. During pre-production, Sergei Bondarchuk and Dino De Laurentiis's Waterloo was released, and failed at the box office. Reconsidering, Kubrick's financiers pulled funding, and he turned his attention towards a film adaptation of Anthony Burgess's 1962 novel A Clockwork Orange. Subsequently, Kubrick showed an interest in Thackeray's Vanity Fair but dropped the project when a serialised version for television was produced. He told an interviewer, "At one time, Vanity Fair interested me as a possible film but, in the end, I decided the story could not be successfully compressed into the relatively short time-span of a feature film ... as soon as I read Barry Lyndon I became very excited about it."

Having earned Oscar nominations for Dr. Strangelove, 2001: A Space Odyssey and A Clockwork Orange, Kubrick's reputation in the early 1970s was that of "a perfectionist auteur who loomed larger over his movies than any concept or star". His studio—Warner Bros.—was therefore "eager to bankroll" his next project, which Kubrick kept "shrouded in secrecy" from the press partly due to the furor surrounding the controversially violent A Clockwork Orange (particularly in the UK) and partly due to his "long-standing paranoia about the tabloid press". Kubrick was initially rumored to be developing an adaptation of Arthur Schnitzler's 1926 novella Dream Story, which would serve as the source material for his later film Eyes Wide Shut (1999).

In 1972 Kubrick finally set his sights on Thackeray's 1844 "satirical picaresque about the fortune-hunting of an Irish rogue", The Luck of Barry Lyndon, the setting of which allowed Kubrick to take advantage of the copious period research he had done for the now-aborted Napoleon. At the time, Kubrick merely announced that his next film would star Ryan O'Neal (deemed "a seemingly un-Kubricky choice of leading man") and Marisa Berenson, a former Vogue and Time magazine cover model, and be shot largely in Ireland. So heightened was the secrecy surrounding the film that "Even Berenson, when Kubrick first approached her, was told only that it was to be an 18th-century costume piece [and] she was instructed to keep out of the sun in the months before production, to achieve the period-specific pallor he required."

=== Screenplay ===
Kubrick based his adapted screenplay on William Makepeace Thackeray's The Luck of Barry Lyndon (republished as the novel Memoirs of Barry Lyndon, Esq.), a picaresque tale written and published in serial form in 1844.

The film departs from the novel in several ways. In Thackeray's writings, events are related in the first person by Barry himself. A comic tone pervades the work, as Barry proves both a raconteur and an unreliable narrator. Kubrick's film, by contrast, presents the story objectively. Though the film contains voice-over (by actor Michael Hordern), the comments expressed are not Barry's, but those of an omniscient narrator. Kubrick felt that using a first-person narrative would not be useful in a film adaptation:

I believe Thackeray used Redmond Barry to tell his own story in a deliberately distorted way because it made it more interesting. Instead of the omniscient author, Thackeray used the imperfect observer, or perhaps it would be more accurate to say the dishonest observer, thus allowing the reader to judge for himself, with little difficulty, the probable truth in Redmond Barry's view of his life. This technique worked extremely well in the novel but, of course, in a film you have objective reality in front of you all of the time, so the effect of Thackeray's first-person story-teller could not be repeated on the screen. It might have worked as comedy by the juxtaposition of Barry's version of the truth with the reality on the screen, but I don't think that Barry Lyndon should have been done as a comedy.

Kubrick made several changes to the plot, including the addition of the final duel.

=== Filming ===
Principal photography lasted 300 days, from spring 1973 through to early 1974, with a break for Christmas. Kubrick initially wished to film the entire production near his home in Borehamwood, but Ken Adam convinced him to relocate the shoot to Ireland. The crew arrived in Dublin in May 1973. Jan Harlan recalls that Kubrick "loved his time in Ireland – he rented a lovely house west of Dublin, he loved the scenery and the culture and the people".

Many of the exteriors were shot in Ireland, playing "itself, England, and Prussia during the Seven Years' War". Kubrick and cinematographer Alcott drew inspiration from "the landscapes of Watteau and Gainsborough", and also relied on the art direction of Ken Adam and Roy Walker. Alcott, Adam and Walker were among those who would win Oscars for their work on the film.

Several of the interior scenes were filmed in Powerscourt House, an 18th-century mansion in County Wicklow. The house was destroyed in an accidental fire several months after filming (November 1974), so the film serves as a record of the lost interiors, particularly the "Saloon" which was used for more than one scene. The Wicklow Mountains are visible, for example, through the window of the saloon during a scene set in Berlin. Other locations included Kells Priory, County Kilkenny (the English Redcoat encampment); Huntington Castle, County Carlow (exterior) and Dublin Castle, County Dublin (the chevalier's home). Some exterior shots were also filmed at Waterford Castle, County Waterford (now a luxury hotel and golf course) and Little Island, Waterford. Moorstown Castle in County Tipperary also featured. Several scenes were filmed at Castletown House in Celbridge, County Kildare; outside Carrick-on-Suir, County Tipperary, and at Youghal, County Cork.

The filming took place in the backdrop of some of the most intense years of the Troubles in Ireland, during which the Provisional Irish Republican Army (Provisional IRA) was waging an armed campaign in order to unite the island. On 30 January 1974, while filming in Dublin City's Phoenix Park, shooting had to be cancelled due to the chaos caused by 14 bomb threats. One day a phone call was received and Kubrick was given 24 hours to leave the country; he left within 12 hours. The phone call alleged that the Provisional IRA had him on a hit list and Harlan recalls: "Whether the threat was a hoax or it was real, almost doesn't matter ... Stanley was not willing to take the risk. He was threatened, and he packed his bag and went home." Production of the film was one-third completed when this occurred, and it was rumored that the film would be abandoned. Nonetheless, Kubrick continued shooting the remainder of the film at locations in England, mainly southern England, and in Scotland, West Germany, and East Germany.

Locations in England include Blenheim Palace, Oxfordshire; Castle Howard, North Yorkshire (exteriors of the Lyndon estate, "Castle Hickham"); Corsham Court, Wiltshire (various interiors and the music room scene); Petworth House, West Sussex (chapel); Stourhead, Wiltshire (lake and temple); Longleat, Wiltshire; Wilton House, Wiltshire (interior and exterior) and Lavenham Guildhall at Lavenham in Suffolk (amputation scene). Filming took place at Dunrobin Castle (exterior and garden as Spa) in Sutherland, Scotland. Locations in West Germany include Ludwigsburg Palace in Ludwigsburg and Hohenzollern Castle in Hechingen, both near Stuttgart. Frederick II of Prussia's Neues Palais at Potsdam near Berlin, at the time East Germany, was also used as a location (suggesting Berlin's main street Unter den Linden as construction in Potsdam had just begun in 1763).

=== Cinematography ===
Special ultra-fast lenses were used for Barry Lyndon to allow filming using only natural light.

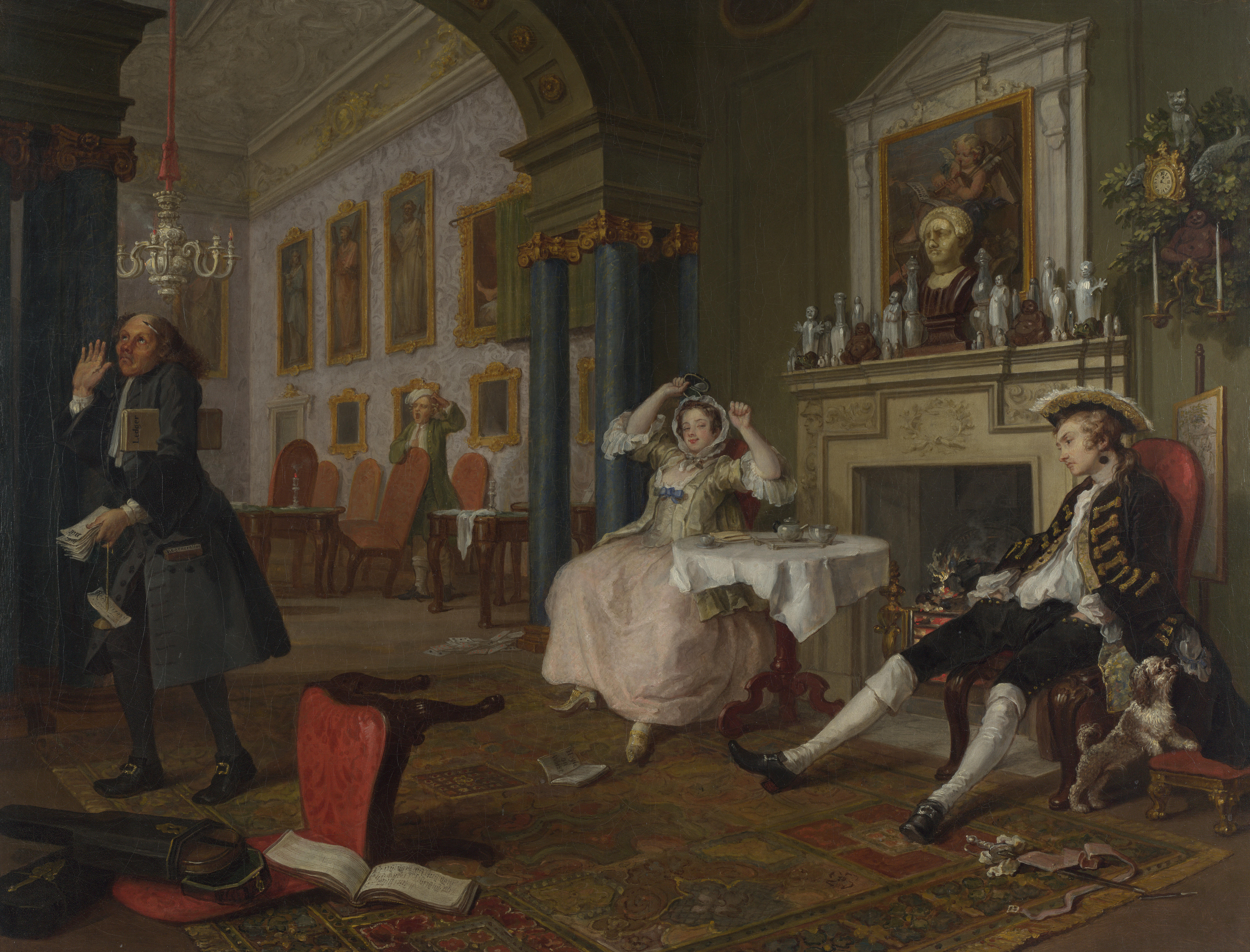
Marriage à-la-mode, Shortly After the Marriage (scene two of six).

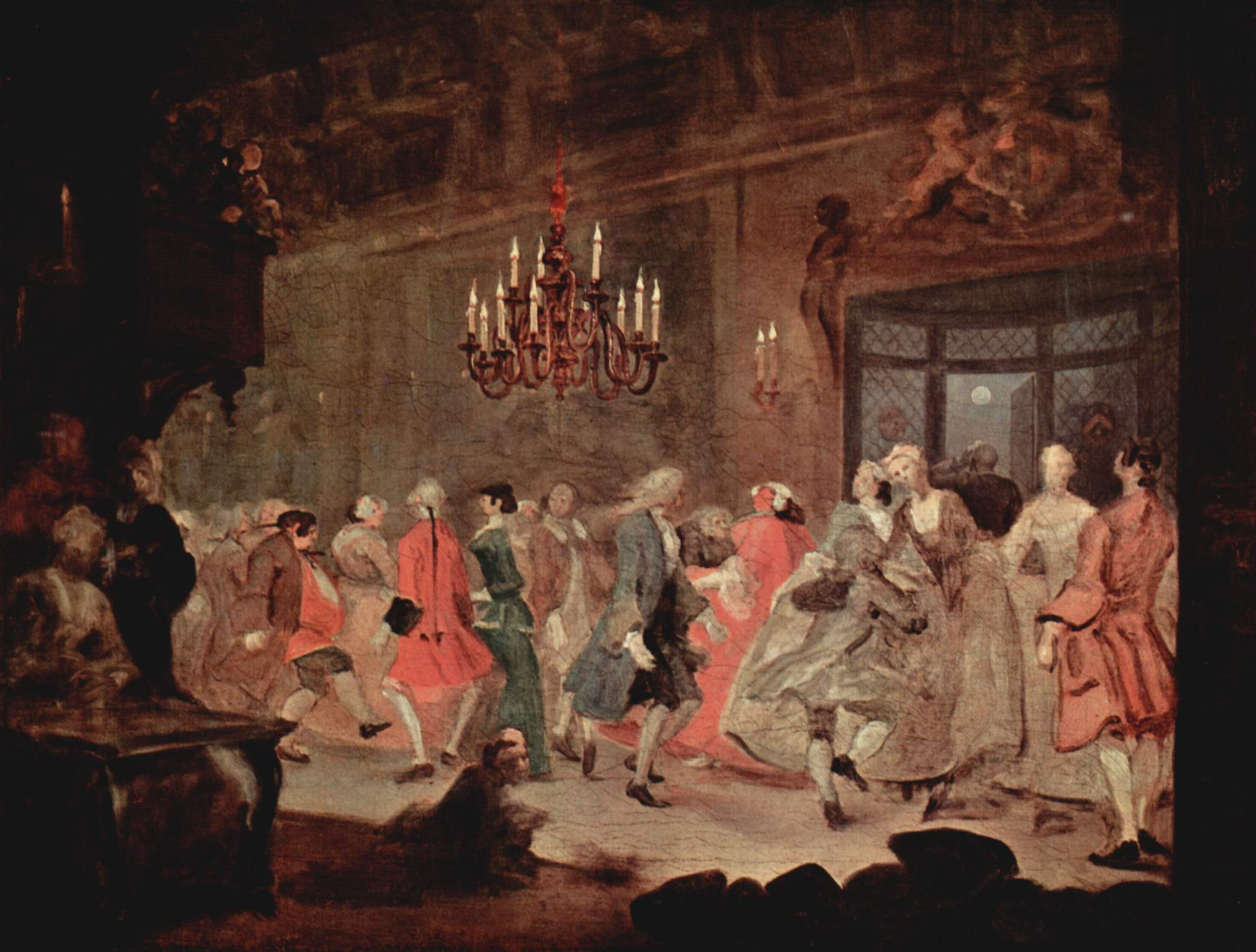
Hogarth's Country Dance (c.1745) illustrates the type of interior scene that Kubrick sought to emulate with Barry Lyndon.

The cinematography of the film, like Kubrick's previous efforts, was innovative. While 2001: A Space Odyssey had featured "revolutionary effects", and The Shining would later feature heavy use of the Steadicam, Barry Lyndon saw a considerable number of sequences shot "without recourse to electric light". The film's cinematography was overseen by director of photography John Alcott (who won an Oscar for his work), and is particularly noted for the technical innovations that made some of its most spectacular images possible. To achieve photography without electric lighting "[f]or the many densely furnished interior scenes … meant shooting by candlelight", which is known to be difficult in still photography, "let alone with moving images".

Kubrick was "determined not to reproduce the set-bound, artificially lit look of other costume dramas from that time". After "tinker[ing] with different combinations of lenses and film stock," the production obtained three super-fast 50mm lenses (Carl Zeiss Planar 50mm f/0.7) developed by Zeiss for use by NASA in the Apollo Moon landings, which Kubrick had discovered. These super-fast lenses "with their huge aperture (the film actually features the lowest f-stop in film history) and fixed focal length" were problematic to mount, and were extensively modified into three versions by Cinema Products Corporation for Kubrick to gain a wider angle of view, with input from optics expert Richard Vetter of Todd-AO. The rear element of the lens had to be 2.5 mm away from the film plane, requiring special modification to the rotating camera shutter. This allowed Kubrick and Alcott to shoot scenes lit in candlelight to an average lighting volume of only three candela, "recreating the huddle and glow of a pre-electrical age". In addition, Kubrick had the entire film push-developed by one stop.

Although Kubrick and Alcott sought to avoid electric lighting where possible, most shots were achieved with conventional lenses and lighting, but were lit to deliberately mimic natural light rather than for compositional reasons. In addition to potentially seeming more realistic, these methods also gave a particular period look to the film which has often been likened to 18th-century paintings (which of course depict a world devoid of electric lighting), in particular owing "a lot to William Hogarth, with whom Thackeray had always been fascinated".

The film is widely regarded as having a stately, static, painterly quality, mostly due to its lengthy, wide-angle long shots. To illuminate the more notable interior scenes, artificial lights called "Mini-Brutes" were placed outside and aimed through the windows, which were covered in a diffuse material to scatter the light evenly through the room rather than being placed inside for maximum use as most conventional films do. In some instances, the natural daylight was allowed to come through, which when recorded on the film stock used by Kubrick showed up as blue-tinted compared to the incandescent electric light.

Despite such slight tinting effects, this method of lighting not only gave the look of natural daylight coming in through the windows, but it also protected the historic locations from the damage caused by mounting the lights on walls or ceilings and the heat from the lights. This helped the film "fit ... perfectly with Kubrick's gilded-cage aesthetic – the film is consciously a museum piece, its characters pinned to the frame like butterflies".

=== Music ===
Barry Lyndon

Soundtrack album by various artists
- Released: 27 December 1975
- Genres: Classical, folk
- Length: 49:48
- Label: Warner Bros.
- Producer: Leonard Rosenman

The film's period setting allowed Kubrick to indulge his penchant for using classical music, and the film score includes pieces by Vivaldi, Bach, Handel, Paisiello, Mozart, and Schubert. (Note: The soundtrack album attributes the composition of the Hohenfriedberger March to Frederick II of Prussia; the origin of this attribution is uncertain.) The piece most associated with the film, however, is the main title music, Handel's Sarabande from the Keyboard suite in D minor (HWV 437). Originally for solo harpsichord, the versions for the main and end titles are performed with strings, timpani, and continuo. The score also includes Irish folk music, including Seán Ó Riada's song "Women of Ireland", arranged by Paddy Moloney and performed by The Chieftains. "The British Grenadiers" also features in scenes with Redcoats marching.

No.	Title	Writer(s)	Performer/conductor/arranger	Length
1.	"Sarabande–Main Title"	George Frideric Handel	National Philharmonic Orchestra	2:38
2.	"Women of Ireland"	Seán Ó Riada	The Chieftains	4:08
3.	"Piper's Maggot Jig"	traditional	The Chieftains	1:39
4.	"The Sea-Maiden"	traditional	The Chieftains	2:02
5.	"Tin Whistles"	Ó Riada	Paddy Moloney & Seán Potts	3:41
6.	"The British Grenadiers"	traditional	Fifes & Drums	2:12
7.	"Hohenfriedberger March"	Frederick II of Prussia	Fifes & Drums	1:12
8.	"Lillibullero"	traditional	Fifes & Drums	1:06
9.	"Women of Ireland"	Ó Riada	Derek Bell	0:52
10.	"March from Idomeneo"	Wolfgang Amadeus Mozart	National Philharmonic Orchestra	1:29
11.	"Sarabande–Duel"	Handel	National Philharmonic Orchestra	3:11
12.	"Lillibullero"	traditional	Leslie Pearson	0:52
13.	"German Dance no. 1 in C major"	Franz Schubert	National Philharmonic Orchestra	2:12
14.	"Sarabande–Duel"	Handel	National Philharmonic Orchestra	0:48
15.	"Film Adaptation of the Cavatina from Il barbiere di Siviglia"	Giovanni Paisiello	National Philharmonic Orchestra	4:28
16.	"Cello Concerto in E minor (third movement)"	Antonio Vivaldi	Lucerne Festival Strings/Pierre Fournier/Rudolf Baumgartner	3:49
17.	"Adagio from Concerto for two harpsichords in C minor"	Johann Sebastian Bach	Münchener Bach-Orchester/Hedwig Bilgram/Karl Richter	5:10
18.	"Film Adaptation of Piano Trio in E-flat, op. 100 (second movement)"	Schubert	Moray Welsh/Anthony Goldstone/Ralph Holmes	4:12
19.	"Sarabande–End Title"	Handel	National Philharmonic Orchestra	4:07
Total length:				49:48

==== Charts ====
Chart (1976)	Position
Australia (Kent Music Report)	99

==== Certifications ====
Region	Certification	Certified units/sales
France (SNEP)	Platinum	300,000^{*}
^{*} Sales figures based on certification alone.

== Reception ==
=== Contemporaneous ===
The film "was not the commercial success Warner Bros. had been hoping for" within the United States, although it fared better in Europe. In the US it earned $9.1 million. The film grossed a worldwide total of $20.3 million against a production budget of $11–12 million.

This mixed reaction saw the film (in the words of one retrospective review) "greeted, on its release, with dutiful admiration – but not love. Critics ... rail[ed] against the perceived coldness of Kubrick's style, the film's self-conscious artistry and slow pace. Audiences, on the whole, rather agreed".

Roger Ebert gave the film three and a half stars out of four and wrote that it "is almost aggressive in its cool detachment. It defies us to care, it forces us to remain detached about its stately elegance." He added, "This must be one of the most beautiful films ever made." Vincent Canby of The New York Times called the film "another fascinating challenge from one of our most remarkable, independent-minded directors." Gene Siskel of the Chicago Tribune gave the film three and a half stars out of four and wrote "I found Barry Lyndon to be quite obvious about its intentions and thoroughly successful in achieving them. Kubrick has taken a novel about a social class and has turned it into an utterly comfortable story that conveys the stunning emptiness of upper-class life only 200 years past." He ranked the film fifth on his year-end list of the best films of 1975.

Charles Champlin of the Los Angeles Times called it "the motion picture equivalent of one of those very large, very heavy, very expensive, very elegant and very dull books that exist solely to be seen on coffee tables. It is ravishingly beautiful and incredibly tedious in about equal doses, a succession of salon quality still photographs—as often as not very still indeed." The Washington Post wrote, "It's not inaccurate to describe 'Barry Lyndon' as a masterpiece, but it's a deadend masterpiece, an objet d'art rather than a movie. It would be more at home, and perhaps easier to like, on the bookshelf, next to something like 'The Age of the Grand Tour,' than on the silver screen." Pauline Kael of The New Yorker wrote that "Kubrick has taken a quick-witted story" and "controlled it so meticulously that he's drained the blood out of it," adding, "It's a coffee-table movie; we might as well be at a three-hour slide show for art-history majors." Steven Spielberg compared the experience of watching Barry Lyndon to “going through the Prado without lunch”.

Jean Baudrillard referenced Barry Lyndon in his seminal work Simulacra and Simulation as an example of hyperreality in cinema. "Let's understand each other: [Barry Lyndon's] quality is not in question. The problem is rather that in some sense we are left completely indifferent... one never did better, one will never do better in . . . in what? Not in evoking, not even in evoking, in simulating".

This "air of disappointment" affected Kubrick's choice for his next film, an adaption of Stephen King's The Shining, a project that would not only please him artistically, but was more likely to succeed financially.

=== Retrospective ===
In the decades following its release, the film gained a more positive reaction. On review aggregator website Rotten Tomatoes, Barry Lyndon has an approval rating of 77% based on 159 reviews. The website's critical consensus reads, "Visually astonishing and placid as a pond in the English countryside, Stanley Kubrick's maddening and masterful Barry Lyndon renders a hollow life with painterly poise." On Metacritic, the film has a weighted average score of 89 out of 100 based on reviews from 21 critics, indicating "universal acclaim". Roger Ebert added the film to his 'Great Movies' list on 9 September 2009 and increased his original rating from three and a half stars to four, writing, "Stanley Kubrick's Barry Lyndon, received indifferently in 1975, has grown in stature in the years since and is now widely regarded as one of the master's best. It is certainly in every frame a Kubrick film: technically awesome, emotionally distant, remorseless in its doubt of human goodness."

The Village Voice ranked the film at number 46 in its Top 250 "Best Films of the Century" list in 1999, based on a poll of critics. Director Martin Scorsese has named Barry Lyndon as his favourite Kubrick film, and it is also one of Lars von Trier's favourite films. Barry Lyndon was included on Time's All-Time 100 best movies list. In the 2012 Sight & Sound Greatest Films of All Time poll, Barry Lyndon placed 19th in the directors' poll and 59th in the critics' poll. The film ranked 27th in BBC's 2015 list of the 100 greatest American films. In 2016, the Directors Guild of America ranked the film 73rd on its list of The 80 Best-Directed Films since the Guild’s founding in 1936. In the 2022 Sight & Sound Greatest Films of All Time poll, Barry Lyndon placed 12th in the directors' poll and 45th in the critics' poll.

The Japanese filmmaker Akira Kurosawa cited the movie as one of his 100 favourite films.

In a list compiled by The Irish Times critics Tara Brady and Donald Clarke in 2020, Barry Lyndon was named the greatest Irish film of all time.

By the time of the film's re-release on its half-centenary in 2025, it was considered a masterpiece. The Financial Times attributed its popularity with 2020s audiences to an influential 2021 edit which overlayed scenes from the film with 21 Savage's "A Lot" which "took the internet by storm".

=== Accolades ===
Award	Category	Recipient	Result	Ref.
Academy Awards	Best Picture	Stanley Kubrick	Nominated	
Academy Awards	Best Director	Stanley Kubrick	Nominated	
Academy Awards	Best Adapted Screenplay	Stanley Kubrick	Nominated	
Academy Awards	Best Art Direction	Art Direction: Ken Adam and Roy Walker; Set Decoration: Vernon Dixon	Won	
Academy Awards	Best Cinematography	John Alcott	Won	
Academy Awards	Best Costume Design	Milena Canonero and Ulla-Britt Söderlund	Won	
Academy Awards	Best Music, Scoring Original Song Score and/or Adaptation	Leonard Rosenman	Won	
British Academy Film Awards	Best Film		Nominated	
British Academy Film Awards	Best Director	Stanley Kubrick	Won	
British Academy Film Awards	Best Art Direction	Ken Adam	Nominated	
British Academy Film Awards	Best Cinematography	John Alcott	Won	
British Academy Film Awards	Best Costume Design	Milena Canonero and Ulla-Britt Söderlund	Nominated	
British Society of Cinematographers	Best Cinematography	John Alcott	Won	
César Awards	Best Foreign Film	Stanley Kubrick	Nominated	
Directors Guild of America Awards	Outstanding Directing – Feature Film	Stanley Kubrick	Nominated	
Golden Globe Awards	Best Motion Picture – Drama		Nominated	
Golden Globe Awards	Best Director	Stanley Kubrick	Nominated	
Los Angeles Film Critics Association Awards	Best Cinematography	John Alcott	Won	
National Board of Review Awards	Best Film		Won (Note: Tied with Nashville.)	
National Board of Review Awards	Top Ten Films		Won (Note: This award does not have a single winner, but recognizes multiple films.)	
National Board of Review Awards	Best Director	Stanley Kubrick	Won (Note: Tied with Robert Altman for Nashville.)	
National Society of Film Critics Awards	Best Cinematography	John Alcott	Won	
Sant Jordi Awards	Best Foreign Film	Stanley Kubrick	Won	
Writers Guild of America Awards	Best Drama Adapted from Another Medium	Stanley Kubrick	Nominated	

== Home media ==
Barry Lyndon was released by Warner Home Video on DVD in 1999. The film was released on Blu-ray by Warner Bros. in 2011. It was released on Blu-ray and DVD by The Criterion Collection in October 2017, featuring a new remaster in the film's original 1.66:1 aspect ratio (compared to the Warner Blu-ray's 16:9 aspect ratio). The film was released on Ultra HD Blu-ray by Criterion in July 2025. This release was included in the Criterion Collection box set The Complete Kubrick which features Kubrick's entire filmography presented on 4K UHD Blu-Rays. The set was released in October 2026.

== See also ==
- List of American films of 1975
- Overlord – the 1975 Stuart Cooper WWII film cinematographer John Alcott also worked on
- Cinema of Ireland
- List of films considered the best
