= John Alcott =

English cinematographer (1930–1986)

- Born: 27 November 1930; Isleworth, Middlesex, England
- Died: 28 July 1986 (aged 55); Cannes, Alpes-Maritimes, France
- Years active: 1948–1986

John Alcott, BSC (27 November 1930 – 28 July 1986) was an English cinematographer, best known for his collaboration with director Stanley Kubrick, with his work on Barry Lyndon (1975) earning him the Academy Award for Best Cinematography.

== Early life ==
Alcott was born in Isleworth, England, in 1930.

He was the son of Arthur Alcott, an executive at Gainsborough Pictures and later Pinewood Studios.

== Career ==
Alcott began his career at a young age as a clapper boy. During the production of 2001: A Space Odyssey (1968), Kubrick promoted Alcott to lighting cameraman, completing the "Dawn of Man" sequence after Geoffrey Unsworth's schedule forced him to depart from production.

Alcott subsequently shot three more films for Kubrick: A Clockwork Orange (1971), Barry Lyndon (1975), and The Shining (1980).

His work on Barry Lyndon broke new grounds in terms of natural lighting. Kubrick completely discarded electric lighting in favor of candle lighting to recreate the mood of an 18th century setting. The film ultimately won Alcott an Academy Award and BAFTA Award for Best Cinematography.

Alcott's work on The Shining also became innovative for inventive uses of a Steadicam to create more fluid camera movements.

In 1981, Alcott moved to the United States, where he directed and shot commercials for television at Paisley Productions.

Alcott was featured in the 1986 PBS documentary Six Kinds Of Light (Masters Of Cinematography).

== Death ==
Alcott died of a heart attack in Cannes, France in 1986, at the age of 55.

His final two films, White Water Summer and No Way Out, were released posthumously, and were dedicated to his memory.

In his memory, the "BSC John Alcott ARRI Award" was created by the British Society of Cinematographers in 1990.

== Filmography ==
Year	Title	Director	Notes
1971	A Clockwork Orange	Stanley Kubrick	
1974	Little Malcolm	Stuart Cooper	
1975	Overlord	Stuart Cooper	
1975	Barry Lyndon	Stanley Kubrick	
1977	March or Die	Dick Richards	
1977	The Disappearance	Stuart Cooper	
1978	Who Is Killing the Great Chefs of Europe?	Ted Kotcheff	
1980	The Shining	Stanley Kubrick	
1980	Terror Train	Roger Spottiswoode	
1981	Fangio: Una vita a 300 all'ora	Hugh Hudson	Documentary film
1981	Fort Apache, the Bronx	Daniel Petrie	
1982	Vice Squad	Gary Sherman	
1982	The Beastmaster	Don Coscarelli	
1983	Triumphs of a Man Called Horse	John Hough	With John Cabrera
1983	Under Fire	Roger Spottiswoode	
1984	Greystoke: The Legend of Tarzan, Lord of the Apes	Hugh Hudson	
1985	Baby: Secret of the Lost Legend	Bill L. Norton	
1986	Miracles	Jim Kouf	
1987	White Water Summer	Jeff Bleckner	Posthumous release
1987	No Way Out	Roger Donaldson	Posthumous release

== Awards and nominations ==
Year	Award	Category	Title	Result	Ref.
1975	Academy Awards	Best Cinematography	Barry Lyndon	Won	
1971	British Academy Film Awards	Best Cinematography	A Clockwork Orange	Nominated	
1975	British Academy Film Awards	Best Cinematography	Barry Lyndon	Won	
1984	British Academy Film Awards	Best Cinematography	Greystoke: The Legend of Tarzan, Lord of the Apes	Nominated	
1975	British Society of Cinematographers	Best Cinematography	Barry Lyndon	Won	
1984	British Society of Cinematographers	Best Cinematography	Greystoke: The Legend of Tarzan, Lord of the Apes	Nominated	
1982	Evening Standard British Film Awards	Special Award		Won	
1985	Evening Standard British Film Awards	Best Technical/Artistic Achievement		Won	
1975	Los Angeles Film Critics Association	Best Cinematography	Barry Lyndon	Won	
1975	National Society of Film Critics	Best Cinematography	Barry Lyndon	Won	
1983	National Society of Film Critics	Best Cinematography	Under Fire	Nominated	
