= Little Malcolm and His Struggle Against the Eunuchs =

1965 play by David Halliwell

- Original language: English
- Written by: David Halliwell
- Characters: Malcolm Scrawdyke

Premiere
- Date: March 30, 1965
- Place: Unity Theatre, London
- Directed by: Mike Leigh

Little Malcolm and His Struggle Against the Eunuchs is a 1965 play by British dramatist David Halliwell. The play launched Halliwell's career and it remains his best-known work. It was produced on the West End, on Broadway (where it was retitled Hail Scrawdyke! for American licensing) and in numerous productions and revivals since. It was adapted into a feature film in 1974 and a radio play in 1992.

== Origin ==
Author David Halliwell attended Huddersfield College of Art, from which he was later expelled, before training at the Royal Academy of Dramatic Art. There, he met lifelong friend Mike Leigh. "He was always writing this play," Leigh recalled to The Guardian, referencing an original script that was approximately 191 pages long. Halliwell's desired title was One Long Wank.

The two rented the Unity Theatre to mount the first production as the "Dramagraph" group. The two-week run was poorly attended. Halliwell took on the title role himself in a show that ran for four to six hours. Though Halliwell denied it was autobiographical, Leigh noted that there were some similarities between him and the main character, particularly in his iconoclastic personality and style.

"I got terribly depressed with the play to start with," Halliwell told the Daily Mail. "I'd been living on National Assistance, the Hampstead Theatre Club refused to put it on, the Royal Court didn't want to know. After it had finished a ten-day run at the Unity, still nothing happened."

Despite its lack of success, it came to the attention of producer Michael Codron, who mounted a new production, cut down to a more manageable length. Codron brought it first to the Dublin Theatre Festival in the fall of 1965, where it generated significant attention, edited to a two and a half hour length. By January 1966, the run time was three hours when it opened in the West End.

== Productions ==
=== World Premiere ===
The play premiered at London's Unity Theatre on 30 March 1965, where its run time was reportedly six hours long. It starred Halliwell himself in the title role, and was directed by Mike Leigh. It also starred longtime friend and Halliwell collaborator Philip Martin, who later served as a resident writer for his Quipu company and directed a number of Halliwell's works for radio.

- Scrawdyke - David Halliwell
- Ingham - Michael Cadman
- Wick - Philip Martin
- Nipple - Ron Cream
- Ann - Julian Burbury

=== West End ===
Producer Michael Codron presented the play at the Gaiety Theatre in Dublin as part of the Dublin Theatre Festival that September, where it received good notices. On 3 February 1966 it moved to the Garrick Theatre in London. Patrick Dromgoole directed, with the following cast:

- Scrawdyke - John Hurt
- Ingham - Rodney Bewes
- Wick - Kenneth Colley
- Nipple - Tim Preece
- Ann - Susan Ashworth

=== Broadway ===
Originally to be retitled Follow the Leader, the play premiered in the United States as Hail Scrawdyke!. It opened at the Booth Theatre on Broadway in November 1966. Directed by Alan Arkin, its cast consisted of:

- Scrawdyke - Victor Henry
- Ingham - Austin Pendleton
- Wick - Drewe Henley
- Nipple - Tim Preece
- Ann - Ann Stockdale

Tim Preece was the only actor to transfer from the West End production. Victor Henry, 23 at the time of the production, hailed from Yorkshire, as did Halliwell. He originally auditioned for the part of Wick but was cast as the lead at the behest of the producer. He was announced as the star of the film version, to begin shooting the following year, though the part eventually went to John Hurt instead.

=== Subsequent productions and revivals ===
- 1966 at Citizens Theatre
- 1966 Royal Court Theatre in London, starring Timothy Dalton and directed by Michael Croft.
- 1966 at Royal Lyceum Theatre in Edinburgh, starring Bryan Marshall and directed by Richard Eyre.
- 1967 Everyman Theatre starring Barry Justice
- 1967 at Oxford Playhouse, starring David Collings and Clive Merrison, directed by Michael Healey.
- 1967 at South Coast Repertory starring Ron Boussom and directed by Ron Thronson
- 1968 at Midland Arts Theatre in Birmingham.
- 1969 at Company of Angels in Los Angeles, directed by Carol Reis and starring Henry Olek.
- 1970 at Compass Theater by Wisconsin Players Repertory
- 1971 at Drummond Studio at Cornell University, directed by Alfred Gingold and starring William Lacey and Jordan Clarke
- 1974 at Human Ensemble Repertory Theatre in Salt Lake City, Utah. Directed by Randy Milligan.
- 1974 at Actors Experimental Unit in New York City. A "stirring revival" directed by Gary Robertson.
- 1976 at Lexington Conservatory Theatre and transferred to Off-Off Broadway in 1977, directed by Oakley Hall III
- 1978 at Goodman Theatre in Chicago under artistic director Gregory Mosher, directed by Michael Maggio and starring Tom Mula.
- 1991 at Basingstoke, directed by Graham Sinclair and starring Michael McElhatton.
- 1998 at Hampstead Theatre in London, directed by Denis Lawson and starring Ewan McGregor
- 2001 at Hull Truck Theatre, directed by Alice Bartlett and starring Stuart Wade.
- 2004 at Bolton Octogon, directed by Mark Babych and starring Paul Simpson.
- 2015 at Southwark Playhouse, produced by Barney McElholm and starring Daniel Easton.

== Critical reception and impact ==
The West End production received significant attention though the run was short and poorly attended, lasting only 20 performances. Critic R.B. Marriott gave it a mixed review, disliking the theme and plot but praising the performances and the talent of Halliwell as a writer. J.C. Trewin praised Hurt's performance, disliking the repetition and harshness of Halliwell's style but recognizing the author's promise. The Daily Telegraph called Halliwell "a dramatist of real promise who seems at the moment to not have his gifts under control." "Its merits much outweigh its defects," according to The London Times.

Critic Alan Brien considered the production as the birth of a new, generational talent for playwriting. He praised it in a review of the original, lengthy Unity Theatre production and considered its revised form at the Dublin Theatre Festival as the discovery of the year. Of its debut in the West End, he said it was "...the first British play to attempt to show us, from the inside, what is bubbling beneath the Cavalier locks, the frosty scowls, the hairy greatcoats and military jeans of the new young," he wrote.

John Hurt's riveting three-hour performance was admired by director Fred Zinneman, resulting in his being cast in the film A Man for All Seasons, his first major film role. A few years later, he returned to the role of Scrawdyke for the film version of the play.

A few weeks after the West End production closed, it was revived at Citizens Theatre in Glasgow by Michael Blakemore, and was subsequently picked up by other theatres. It became profitable and influential as its cult status spread. Halliwell used this success to start his own theatre company, Quipu.

Later in 1966, the play was revived by the National Youth Theatre at the Court Theatre as their first production of a modern play. It was a week-long run, ending a season sponsored by the Daily Mail. It starred a young Timothy Dalton and was hailed by critic R.B. Marriott, who had previously given the West End debut a tepid review. "It is a play with a vital life of its own, of such originality of feeling and approach, that it will somehow survive for a long time," Marriott said, comparing this potential longevity, in spite of divided critical views, to John Arden's Serjeant Musgrave's Dance. The Daily Mail called it "a triumph." The production was critically acclaimed, with praise for Dalton's performance and for the National Youth Theatre's transition from classical repertoire to important contemporary plays. It coincided with a rise in the popularity of the play, despite its initial lack of commercial success, with productions at the Edinburgh Theatre Festival and in Brussels

In January 1967, drama critic Philip Hope-Wallace presented Halliwell with the Evening Standard award for "most promising playwright".

In the United States, the play was retitled Hail Scrawdyke! for the premiere and was actor Alan Arkin's Broadway directing debut. The run was unsuccessful critically and commercially. Walter Kerr panned it, saying "Finally someone has gotten around to telling us what England's angry young men are so angry about...I'd rather not have known." It closed after eight performances.

The 1968 production in Birmingham prompted outcry from some critics regarding the use of profanity in the play. Halliwell responded with an editorial defending his use of such words, stating that the obligation of artists is to extend awareness and to accurately relate to the world, and that shielding students from words they already know amounted to a situation in which "artificial problems are allowed to obliterate the consideration of genuine ones."

In 1998, Ewan McGregor starred in a well-received revival at Hampstead Theatre, under the direction of Denis Lawson. It was McGregor's London theatre debut.

== Adaptations ==
=== Little Malcolm ===
Beatles guitarist George Harrison attended a production of Halliwell's play in 1966, and reportedly loved it; he agreed a few years later to finance the production of a feature film version. Through the Suba company, an entity created to realize the profits of the film Yellow Submarine, Harrison fully financed the approximately one million pound production costs. The film was shot in 1973 and directed by American filmmaker Stuart Cooper. It quickly became embroiled in the lawsuits and legal actions resulting from the breakup of the Beatles. At the 24th Berlin International Film Festival it won the Silver Bear award. Its brief theatrical run attracted critical acclaim, but the film was generally unavailable until a 2011 home media release.

=== BBC Radio adaptation ===
Halliwell, who wrote numerous plays for radio during his career, adapted the play for the BBC in 1992. It was broadcast on 1 November as an edition of the Sunday Play on BBC Radio 3. Directed by Philip Martin, it starred David Streames as Malcolm, Richard Pearce as Wick, Mark Kilmurry as Ingham, Adrian Lochhead as Nipple, and Annette Badland as Ann.
