= Tim Preece =

English actor (born 1938)

- Born: 5 August 1938 (age 88); Shrewsbury, England
- Occupation: Actor

Tim Preece (born 5 August 1938) is an English actor. He has appeared on British television since the 1960s and also acted on stage.

== Early life ==
Preece was born in Shrewsbury in Shropshire and was educated at the Priory Grammar School for Boys, Shrewsbury. He trained as an actor at the Bristol Old Vic.

== Career ==
In 1965, Preece was cast as Nipple in Little Malcolm and His Struggle Against the Eunuchs by David Halliwell. He played the role in 1965 at the Dublin Theatre Festival, at the West End premiere opposite John Hurt in 1966, and later that autumn in the Broadway premiere directed by Alan Arkin. He was the only original cast member to transfer to Broadway.

Preece's television roles include playing Codal in the six-part Doctor Who serial Planet of the Daleks (1973) and Tom Patterson in the first two series of The Fall and Rise of Reginald Perrin (1976–77). He later returned to the role for The Legacy Of Reginald Perrin (1996). He also appeared as the editor of a local newspaper in "The Journalist", an episode of People Like Us (2001) with Chris Langham. Preece played the recurring role of Rev. Sparrow in Waiting for God (1992–94).

His other television appearances include the Foyle's War episode "War Games" (2003) as James Philby, the pilot of a doomed holiday jet in the Casualty episode "Cascade" (1992), and as Mark's careers guidance counsellor and therapist in the Peep Show episode "Dream Job" (2003).

In 2017, Preece appeared in a Royal National Theatre production of the improvised play Lost Without Words.

== Selected filmography ==
- Crossplot (1969)
- Out of the Trees (1976, TV)
- Brimstone and Treacle (1982)
- Vanity Fair (2004)
- Elizabeth: The Golden Age (2007)
- The Ghost Writer (2010)
