= Overlord (1975 film) =

- Directed by: Stuart Cooper
- Written by: Stuart Cooper; Christopher Hudson
- Produced by: James Quinn
- Starring: Brian Stirner; Davyd Harries
- Cinematography: John Alcott
- Edited by: Jonathan Gili
- Music by: Paul Glass
- Release date: 1975
- Running time: 84 minutes
- Country: United Kingdom
- Language: English
- Budget: £89,951
- Box office: £41,007

Overlord is a 1975 black-and-white British war film written and directed by Stuart Cooper. Set during the Second World War, around the D-Day invasion (Operation Overlord), the film is about a young British soldier's experiences and his meditations on being part of the war machinery, including his premonitions of death. The film won the Silver Bear - Special Jury Prize at the 25th Berlin International Film Festival. “Overlord is not about military heroics; on the contrary, it is about the bleakness of sacrifice”, Cooper said.

== Plot ==
The film opens with footage taken by the victorious German Army following the Battle of France in 1940 and aerial shots, including Adolf Hitler surveying conquered territory from an aeroplane. Cut to the interior of a landing craft on D-Day, filled with as yet unidentified characters, young soldiers. A blurry image of a soldier running, alone and falling, shot dead, dissolves to a man running down an English lane to his home. This is Tom and the film follows this everyman through his call up to the East Yorkshire Regiment, his training, his meeting a young girl, his journey to France and his death on D-Day at Sword Beach.

== Cast ==
Data from TCM.com

- Brian Stirner as Thomas Beddows
- Davyd Harries as Jack
- Nicholas Ball as Arthur
- Julie Neesam as the Girl
- John Franklyn-Robbins as Dad
- Stella Tanner as Mum
- David Warner (actor) as Voice of Authority

== Production ==
In an 18 January 2008 article he wrote for The Guardian to coincide with the film's re-release, Stuart Cooper described at length the creation of this film. He originally intended to make a documentary about the Overlord Embroidery tapestry. Cooper was told that it would take nine years to review all the footage in the collection, which included dangerous nitrate film stock. He wrote that after narrowing his selection,

I spent approximately 3,000 hours in that dark cell between 1971 and 1975...It was during the archival research that I developed the idea of a dramatised feature film about an English soldier who sees his first action on D-Day, interweaving the archive footage to expand and tell the story. More research in the museum's document section - reading letters and unpublished diaries of ordinary soldiers who saw action in the first wave of D-Day - refined the concept...The film archive controlled what historical events our soldier's story would encompass. Once that was established, [Christopher] Hudson was able to dramatise some wonderful and totally original scenes extracted from diaries and letters of real servicemen.

The Imperial War Museum and the Ministry of Defence assisted the production in many ways, from help with costumes and props to training actors and a flight by the last operational Lancaster bomber over Bristol.

Seventy per cent of Overlord is "live action" (newly shot footage), filmed in ten days. The rest is archival footage, from British training missions to the invasion and captured German film. Cooper and his cinematographer, John Alcott, tried to create a consistent look when filming the contemporary footage. Cooper said, "After Alcott examined [the pristine nitrate negatives], we decided to film Overlord on period lenses. Alcott scoured England and found two sets of 1936 and 1938 German Goerz and Schneider lenses. Alcott then applied a lighting style in keeping with the war photography".

== Reception and legacy ==
Overlord originally failed to get US theatrical distribution and was only shown there in select screenings and on television (including a run on California's Z Channel in 1982, which was highlighted in the acclaimed 2004 TV documentary film Z Channel: A Magnificent Obsession). In 2006, the film saw its first US release through Janus Films and in early 2008 a re-mastered edition was re-released in cinemas (on 1 February, with a launch at the Institute of Contemporary Arts) and on DVD (on 3 March) in Britain. Overlord was released as part of the Criterion Collection in 2007.

On review aggregator website Rotten Tomatoes, the film received an approval rating of 90% based on 20 reviews, with an average rating of 8.04/10. On Metacritic, the film has a weighted average score of 88 out of 100 based on 8 critics, indicating "universal acclaim". Roger Ebert gave the film a full four stars upon its re-release and argued that it "combines its newsreel and fictional footage so effectively that it has a greater impact than all fiction, or all documentary, could have achieved". Jonathan Rosenbaum, however, said the film was "an interesting failure" criticizing the sincere yet clichéd story integrating with a remarkable selection of newsreels.

== See also ==
- Barry Lyndon - the 1975 Academy Award-winning film by Stanley Kubrick that John Alcott also worked on
- List of British films of 1975
