= Victor Henry (actor) =

British actor (1943–1985)

- Born: 30 July 1943; Leeds, Yorkshire, England
- Died: 20 November 1985 (aged 42); Wakefield, West Yorkshire, England
- Occupation: Actor
- Years active: Mid 1960s–early 1970s
- Notable work: All Neat in Black Stockings

Victor Henry (30 July 1943, in Leeds, Yorkshire – 20 November 1985, in Wakefield, West Yorkshire) was an English actor best known for his work on stage particularly at the Royal Court. Simon Callow called him "a phenomenal actor."

== Career ==
Educated at RADA, Henry appeared from the mid-1960s in various stage roles and was praised by Laurence Olivier. In 1966, he appeared on Broadway in the title role of Hail Scrawdyke! by David Halliwell, directed by Alan Arkin. It closed after eight performances.

Henry also worked in a number of TV shows such as Diary of a Young Man, The Gamblers and The Contenders. He also appeared sporadically in films, notably playing a lead role in the comedy drama All Neat in Black Stockings alongside Susan George, released in 1969.

His career continued until 1972, when he was severely injured in a road accident. While he was walking from a theatre a car struck a concrete lamppost which fell and struck his head, sending him into a coma. Victor was moved to Pinderfields Hospital in Wakefield so his mother could visit him daily. Henry never regained consciousness, and eventually died in 1985, aged 42.

== Filmography ==
Year	Title	Role	Notes
1967	Privilege	Freddie K	
1967	The Sorcerers	Alan	
1967	The White Bus	Transistorite	
1969	All Neat in Black Stockings	Ginger	

== Select theatre credits ==
- Total Eclipse
- Look Back in Anger
- When Did You See my Mother Last
