= Little Island, Waterford =

Island in County Waterford, Ireland

Little Island
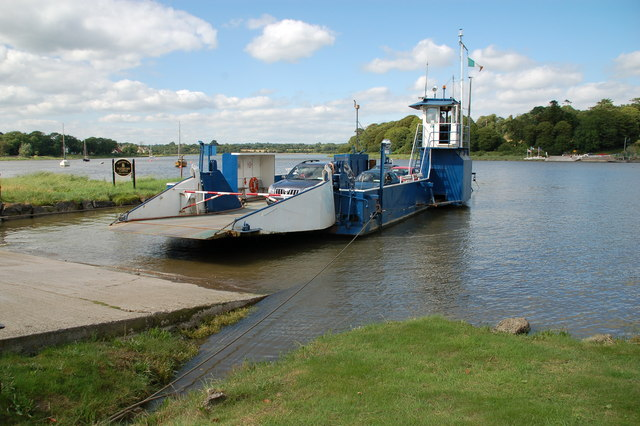
- Little Island ferry

- Location within island of Ireland

Geography
- Location: River Suir
- Coordinates: 52.2472°N 7.0486°W
- Area: 1.7 km^{2} (0.66 sq mi)

Administration
- Ireland
- Province: Munster
- County: Waterford

Little Island is an island on the eastern outskirts of Waterford City in Ireland. It is encircled by the River Suir and Kings Channel and is 420 acres in extent.

== History ==
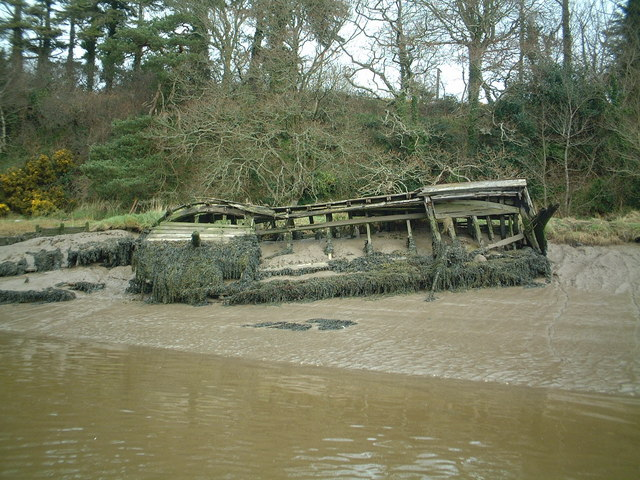
A wooden wreck, the remains of two wooden vessels lie on the west side of Little Island. This is a gabbard, from recollection acquired around 1963 from the Waterford harbour master/ authority who already used it as an access pontoon. On The Island, It was tied up to a barge (the M71) in turn tied to the jetty. It was the means to get from the prong (row boat) to the land at all stages of the tide.

According to tradition, a monastic settlement existed on the island sometime between the sixth and eighth centuries, and two "finds" on the land have lent substance to this: A winged angel dating from the 8th century and the crude carving of a monk's head, dating from the 6th century. (The latter carving is now displayed over the main entrance to the current castle.) During the Viking era, between the 9th and 11th centuries, the island was referred to as Dane's Island or Island Vra large number of Waterford yk. The Vikings built two fortifications guarding the river at the north and the south.

The first family to live on the Island were the FitzGerald Family, who were cousins to Strongbow. They were awarded the land for their part in the Norman invasion of 1170. During the 15th and 16th centuries, the FitzGeralds hosted feasts and banquets on the island. The family later took the name Purcell-Fitzgerald through marriage.

The first structure to be built on the island was a Norman keep. By the 15th century, the ruins of the keep were no longer habitable. A tower, the centre part of the present castle, was then constructed on the site of the old keep. Initially, it was relatively modest in size but over the years was enlarged, firstly in 1849 by John Fitzgerald and subsequently in 1875 and 1895 when the east and west wings were added. Built entirely of stone, these additions are now indistinguishable from the older structure. At that time, the island was equipped with the latest in machine shop technology including lathes, grinding equipment, a 3ton overhead gantry, and so forth in the farm yard, This included a 110 V DC generator which was used to power the castle, the workshop, and the water pump (site of old windmill). Developments included a large arrangement of loose boxes and a dairy, forming the boundary to a large farm yard complete with a large two-story steward's house. As of mid-2014, these were all still extant.

The island and the castle remained in the FitzGerald name for almost eight centuries, until they were sold in 1966 to the Igoe family (Aberfoyle Plantations). They bought the property and installed a 5-acre (20,000 m^{2}) complex of glass houses from which they produced flowers for export. These included the latest in glasshouse technology at the time. They completely refurbished the castle and the cottages on the island – for example "Seaford" is located beside the jetty and the ferry-man lived there. In 1966, they employed a large number of Waterford people during construction and in operating the farm. The Igoes have been credited with saving the castle and bringing the island up to date.

Prior to the Igoe era, in 1956, John and Betty Williams came from Lough Ree near Athlone and took on the island from Princess Maria D'Ardia Caracciola on a lease arrangement. They managed a herd of 40 cows, shipping the milk across the river by prong every day to the Gaultier Creamery co-op. They grew barley and wheat, which they brought by barge (M71) to the mill in Waterford in the late winter time. Later on, they grew potatoes and sold them in a shop which they started in Lombard street (1963-6). All machinery was carried across the river in a "cattle boat", the remains of which can be seen lying on the mud just down-river from the landing place. In this time, they received great help from the Grant and Carslake families who lived and worked on the farm.

From 1973 to 1974, the island served as one of the shooting locations for Stanley Kubrick's film Barry Lyndon. Much of this was shot in Ballinakill House.

Michael Farren, a horticultural engineer from Dublin, renovated and developed the Island from 1974 to 1982. In 1982, the island was rented to a local dairy farmer, who later bought it.

The castle became a hotel in 1988 and the island became its grounds. Much of the land has since been converted into a golf course.

== The Igoe's ==
The head of the family, Bill Igoe, was from Nenagh, while his forebears came from near Bonniconlon in County Mayo. He bought Little Island because of its horticultural potential. Access was by way of a "prong" or heavy rowing boat. A very old barge, powered by an old two stroke motor, was used for moving crops and produce upstream to Waterford City. As time passed, this was replaced first by a World War II DUKW (an amphibious two ton truck), then by another World War II vessel, a landing craft which could transport vehicles as large as oil tankers; and eventually by a purpose built chain ferry constructed by Verolme shipyards in Cork. Horticulture consisted of 5 acres (20,000 m^{2}) of modern glasshouses growing flowers for the export market, and outdoor crops such as salads, daffodils, raspberries and asparagus. During this period from 1965, approximately 30 people were employed on Little Island.

== Today ==
Today the island, castle and grounds, continue to comprise a (19 bedroom) luxury hotel and golf course, Waterford Castle. The island is linked to the mainland by a private ferry which operates across Kings Channel between Ballinakill and the island's west side.

The island is a common site for bird watching. The main species are the grey heron (breeding), little egret, Eurasian wigeon, greenshank, common sandpiper and commoner waders, common kingfisher and Eurasian jay.

In the 1950s and 1960s, the sloblands were home to flocks of wild geese.
