= A Test of Violence =

1969 British film by Stuart Cooper

- Directed by: Stuart Cooper
- Produced by: Daniel Rees
- Edited by: Alex Rayment
- Music by: Paul Glass
- Distributed by: J. Arthur Rank Film (UK); Universal Pictures (US)
- Release date: 1969
- Running time: 14 minutes
- Country: United Kingdom
- Language: English

A Test of Violence is a 1969 BAFTA nominated British short film directed by Stuart Cooper.

== Summary ==
The film is an introduction to the work of Spanish artist Juan Genovés, exploring its minimalist aesthetic and storytelling qualities through a variety of cinematic techniques, including rostrum, animation, news footage and live action recreations.

== Accolades ==
The film went on to win awards at the 1970 Berlin (C.I.D.A.L.C. Gandhi Award), Moscow, and Venice film festivals.
