= Paul Glass =

Swiss-American composer (born 1934)

Paul Eugène Glass (born November 19, 1934) is a Swiss-American composer.

== Life ==
Born in Los Angeles, California, Glass is the son of silent film actor and film executive Gaston Glass. He was educated at the University of Southern California (BM), and was taught by Ingolf Dahl, and Goffredo Petrassi in Rome (on a Fulbright Scholarship). Glass also attended Princeton University under a fellowship, and attended the Institute of International Education in Warsaw with Witold Lutoslawski on a grant. He joined ASCAP in 1961.

Glass has been married twice, the first time being to Marina Fistoulari Mahler, on April 3, 1965, and the second time being to Penelope Margaret Mackworth-Praed, on July 12, 1977. Glass and Mackworth-Praed currently live in Magadino, Switzerland. Both have been professors at Franklin University Switzerland.

== Selected works ==
Paul Glass' works are published by Müller & Schade.

Ballet

- eschatos, ballet (1957)
- kakapo, ballet pour enfants (2001)

Orchestra

- sinfonia n. 1 (1959)
- suita symfonyczna (sinfonia n. 2) (1961)
- eufonia per orchestra d'archi (1982)
- sinfonia n. 3 (1986)
- lamento dell'acqua (1990)
- ektenia (1992)
- sinfonia n. 4 (1992)
- quan shi qu (1994)
- corale I per margaret per orchestra d'archi (1995)
- distanza per orchestra d'archi e quartetto d'archi (1995)
- how to begin (1995)
- sinfonia n. 5 "ad modum missae" per coro di voci bianche, coro e orchestra (1999)
- sinfonia n. 6 quinto giorno (2003)
- corale II per margaret per orchestra d'archi (2004)
- grandiflora (2005)
- corale III per margaret per orchestra d'archi (2006)
- sinfonia n.7 (2011)
- teilchen per orchestra d'archi (2013)
- teilchen per grande orchestra (2018)
- sinfonia n.8 (2019)
- omaggio al minimo per orchestra d'archi (2019)
- the return to dissonance for large orchestra (2019)
- tre interludî dall'opera "la bellezza, forse" per orchestra d'archi (2020)
- la myriade de couleurs pour grand orchestre (2020)
- consonanze di passaggio per orchestra (2020)
- nonsisa per orchestra (2022)
- palestrinalogia per orchestra d’archi (2022)
- sinfonia n.9 (2023)
- tre suoni per orchestra d'archi (2024)
- daleko variazioni specchiate lontane per grande orchestra (2026)

Soloist(s) with orchestra

- concerto per violoncello e orchestra (1961)
- concerto per pianoforte estemporaneo e grande orchestra (1982)
- soggetti migranti per 3 percussionisti e orchestra (2002)
- lo svasso cornuto per corno inglese e orchestra (2004)
- el buen aire para violoncelo, piano y orquestra (2006)
- romanza per solo violino e orchestra (2019)
- lirica elegiaca per clarinetto e orchestra (2022)

Chamber music

- variations for woodwind quintet (1949)
- passacaglia for string quartet (1949)
- quartet for 4 trombones (1954)
- rondo for violin and piano (1954)
- music for brass and percussion (1955)
- quintet for clarinet and string quartet (1956)
- trio for flute, cello and piano (1956)
- 3 pezzi per violino e pianoforte (1957)
- sonata per violoncello e pianoforte (1962)
- trio per flauto, clarinetto e fagotto (1964)
- quartetto per flauto, clarinetto, viola e violoncello (1966)
- pezzo per clarinetto basso (1969)
- une chanson silencieuse pour flûte et violoncelle (1969)
- vittoria per viola (1970)
- woodwind quintet n.2 (1971)
- studio for 2 cellos (1971)
- suite pour soeur et frère pour 2 violons, alto, violoncelle et contrebasse (1971)
- trio I per violino, violoncello e pianoforte (1971)
- échanges pour 16 instrumentalistes (1973)
- septett für 2 hörner, 2 trompeten, 2 posaunen und tuba (1976)
- wie ein naturlaut für 10 instrumentalisten (1977)
- quartetto per oboe, violino, viola e violoncello (1978)
- quartetto per sassofoni (1980)
- 3 pezzi per clarinetto (1981)
- variazioni (Variations) per flauto solo (1981)
- fux-variationen per violoncello solo
- arundo donax per 3 oboi (anche 3 corni inglesi) (1982)
- eufonia per quintetto d'archi (1982)
- quartetto I per archi (1988)
- bis per pianoforte (1995)
- confronto per violoncello solo (1995)
- distanza per quartetto d'archi (1995)
- specchio per violino solo (1995)
- un piccolo giro per quartetto d'archi (1995)
- Incompréhension pour hautbois, cor et violoncelle (1969)
- prisma per ballerina per sassofono contralto, corno, trombone, pianoforte, percussione e contrabbasso (2002)
- confronto II per flauto solo (2004)
- doppelwitz für 2 bratschen (2004)
- tre ghiri per 3 violini (2004)
- solenne for 4 tromboni, o 4 fagotti, o 4 violoncelli (2004)
- adagio per violino, viola e violoncello (2006)
- atrevoci per flauto contralto, corno inglese e fagotto (2006)
- confronto per corno solo (2006)
- in tono sommesso per clarinetto e clarinetto basso (2006)
- scomposizione originale for violoncello solo (2006)
- spiegel per contrabbasso solo (2006)
- intervalli per viola (2007)
- intervalli per tre trombe in do (2007)
- intervalli per fagotto (2007)
- Ida y vuelta per violino e violoncello (2007)
- en todas las tonalidades per clarinetto in Sib (2007)
- ida y vuelta per due violini (2008)
- ottantaquattro per violoncello (2008)
- vanessa atalanta per flauto solo (2012)
- trois études pour quatuor à cordes (2012)
- quartetto II per archi (2018)
- trombonite per solo trombone (2019)
- passacaglia 2019 - nello stile di allora per quartetto d'archi (2019)
- come un'improvvisazione per solo violoncello (2019)
- bach im spiegel per solo violoncello (2019)
- elegia per trio d'archi (2019)
- los sostenidos para solo violín (2019)
- la viola che scende per sola viola (2020)
- controtutti per solo controfagotto (2020)
- quartetto III per archi (2020)
- trio II per violino, violoncello e pianoforte (2021)
- riflessioni per sola tromba in do (2021)
- un corno che vale per corno in fa (2021)
- due folaghe per due violoncelli (2022)
- tubalissima per tuba sola (2022)
- arpalogia per arpa sola (2022)
- clarinata per clarinetto solo (2022)
- los bemoles para solo violín (2024)
- permutazioni specchiate per violoncello solo (2024)
- trio III per violino, violoncello e pianoforte (2024)

Piano

- 5 pezzi per pianoforte (1983)
- omaggio (1995)
- precipitevolissimevolmente (2006)
- ottantaquattro per pianoforte (2007)
- Il piccolo portico di carona (2008)
- drei teilchen für klavier (2013)
- trois préludes (2019)

Vocal

- 5 chansons pour une princesse errante pour baryton et piano (1968, versione per baritono e orchestra 1992)
- vocalizzo per soprano, flauto, corno inglese, fagotto, violino, violoncello e pianoforte (2004)
- tre poesie per soprano e quartetto d'archi – I erbe (2020) II sapiens (2022) III invito (2022); testo di Alberto Nessi

Chorus

- deh, spiriti miei, quando mi vedete per coro (1987); testo di Guido Cavalcanti
- pianto della madonna per soporano, baritono, coro e orchestra (1988); testo di Jacopone da Todi
- sahassavagga per coro di voci bianche (1976); testo: gautama buddha
- success counted is sweetest for chorus (1954); words by Emily Dickinson
- salmo LXXXIII per coro (1957)
- Un sogno per coro di voci bianche (1981); testo di Alberto Nessi

Opera

- la bellezza, forse (2018); libretto by Alberto Nessi

Selected film scores

- The Abductors (1957)
- George Grosz' Interregnum (1960)
- Fear No More (1961)
- Lady in a Cage (1964)
- Nightmare in the Sun (1965)
- Bunny Lake Is Missing (1965)
- A Test of Violence (1969)
- Sole Survivor (1970)
- Five Desperate Women (1971)
- Sandcastles (1971)
- Overlord (1975)
- To the Devil a Daughter (1976)
