= Gay Hamilton =

British actress

- Born: 29 April 1943 (age 83); Uddingston, South Lanarkshire, Scotland
- Occupation: Actress
- Years active: 1963–present

Gay Hamilton (born 29 April 1943) is a British actress, most notable for her roles in Stanley Kubrick's Barry Lyndon and Ridley Scott's The Duellists.

== Career ==
Hamilton was born in Uddingston. In the late 1960s and early 1970s, she played the love interest and later wife of Detective Chief Superintendent John Watt (played by Frank Windsor) in the TV series Softly, Softly and its Taskforce spin-off.

She appeared in two episodes of the ITC series Man in a Suitcase (1967), played student teacher Ann Collins in the "Please Sir" episode "Student Princess" (1968), and Eva Zoref, the wife of Anton Zoref (Ian McShane), in the Space: 1999 episode "Force of Life" (1975). In 1980 she played the part of Dr. Claire Wilson in the Shoestring episode "The Farmer had a Wife". She more recently played Edwina Dunn in EastEnders and Maisie McLintock in Doctors.

== Selected filmography ==
- A Man for All Seasons (1966) – 2nd Handmaiden / 3rd Girl (uncredited)
- A Challenge for Robin Hood (1967) – Maid Marian
- Barry Lyndon (1975) – Nora Brady
- Eclipse (1977) – Cleo
- The Duellists (1977) – Maid
- Questo sì che è amore (1978) – Gwen
- Walking with the Enemy (2013) – Frau Lustig (final film role)

== Theatre ==
- Teeth 'n' Smiles (1976)
