= John Franklyn-Robbins =

English actor (1924–2009)

- Born: John Hugh Franklyn-Robbins; 14 December 1924; Cheltenham, Gloucestershire, England
- Died: 21 March 2009 (aged 84); London, England
- Occupations: Actor, voice actor

John Franklyn-Robbins (14 December 1924 – 21 March 2009) was an English character and voice actor.

== Career ==
A prolific Shakespearean actor, he trained at RADA and proceeded to work at the Manchester Library Theatre and the Bristol Old Vic early in his career. He played a diverse number of roles, ranging from Ariel in The Tempest to Macduff in Macbeth. His prestigious stage career included stints in both the West End and Broadway.

He also worked for both the BBC and ITV in their early formative years and went on to appear in such classic television series as The Avengers, The Baron, Z-Cars, Special Branch, Callan, I, Claudius, Doctor Who and Star Trek: The Next Generation. He was one of only ten actors to appear in both of the latter two series. Films include Asylum (1972), Overlord (1975), Mrs. Dalloway (1997) and The Golden Compass (2007).He played the role of Giuseppe Garibaldi in Series 1, episode 10 of The Onedin Line (1972).

Robbins provided the voice of the Dream Maker in the hit children's animated fantasy television series The Dreamstone.

== Death ==
He died aged 84 on 21 March 2009.

== Filmography ==
=== Film ===
- The Pumpkin Eater (1964) - Parson
- Running Scared (1972) - Dean
- Dracula A.D. 1972 (1972) - Minister (uncredited)
- Asylum (1972) - Stebbins (segment: "The Weird Tailor")
- Take Me High (1973) - Alderman
- Swallows and Amazons (1974) - Young Billy
- Overlord (1975) - Dad
- The Brute (1977) - Solicitor
- Memoirs of a Survivor (1981) - Prof. White
- From a Far Country (1981) - Curate
- The Plague Dogs (1982) - Williamson (voice)
- The Jigsaw Man (1983) - English doctor
- Lionheart (1987) - The Abbot
- Dr. Jekyll and Ms. Hyde (1995) - Prof. Manning
- The Adventures of Toad (1996) - Additional Voices (voice)
- Emma (1996) - Mr Cole
- Mrs Dalloway (1997) - Lionel, Clarissa's Father
- Lolita (1997) - (uncredited)
- Santa's First Christmas (1999) - Santa Claus (voice)
- The Discovery of Heaven (2001) - Onno's father
- Don't Tempt Me (2001)
- Bright Young Things (2003) - Judge
- Vanity Fair (2004) - Mr. Sedley
- Sergeant Pepper (2004) - Gregor von Gordenthal
- The Golden Compass (2007) - Librarian (final film role)

=== Television ===
- The Quarry (1964 BBC West TV - written and directed by John Boorman) as Arthur King
- Jude the Obscure (1971) as Phillotson
- Budgie, as Marcus Lake (1971) episode Could Do Better
- The Onedin Line, as Giuseppe Garibaldi (1971-1978)
- The Shadow of the Tower (1972) - Sir William Stanley
- Doctor Who serial, Genesis of the Daleks (1975) - Time Lord
- I, Claudius (1976) - Atticus
- The Merchant of Venice (1980) - Antonio
- The Woman in Black (1989) - Reverend Greet
- Seize the Fire (1989) - Prometheus
- The Dreamstone (1990) - The Dream Maker (voice)
- Star Trek: The Next Generation episode, Preemptive Strike (1994) - Macias
- The Inspector Alleyn Mysteries, episode Scales of Justice (1994) - Octavius Danberry Phinn
- A Christmas Carol (1999) - Mister Crump (Undertaker)
- Terry Pratchett's Hogfather (2006) - Dean
