= Little Malcolm =

1974 film

- DVD cover
- Directed by: Stuart Cooper
- Written by: David Halliwell (play); Derek Woodward
- Produced by: Gavrik Losey
- Starring: John Hurt
- Cinematography: John Alcott
- Edited by: Ray Lovejoy
- Music by: Stanley Myers
- Distributed by: Apple Films
- Release date: 1974
- Running time: 109 minutes
- Country: United Kingdom
- Language: English

Little Malcolm is a 1974 British comedy drama film directed by Stuart Cooper and starring John Hurt. It was written by Derek Woodward based on David Halliwell's stage play Little Malcolm and His Struggle Against the Eunuchs. The play's full name is used as the film title on the BFI Flipside 2011 DVD release.

== Plot ==
Malcolm Scrawdyke, a fascist political figure, plots revenge against the college that expelled him by forming the Party of Dynamic Erection, a right-wing political movement, with three acolytes.

== Cast ==
- Rosalind Ayres as Ann Gedge
- John Hurt as Malcolm Scrawdyke
- John McEnery as Wick Blagdon
- Raymond Platt as Irwin Ingham
- David Warner as Dennis Charles Nipple

== Production ==
An Apple Films project, Little Malcolm was the first feature film executive produced by former Beatle George Harrison.

Like many of Apple's film and recording projects, production on Little Malcolm was then jeopardised by lawsuits pertaining to Harrison, John Lennon and Ringo Starr's severing of ties with manager Allen Klein. Speaking in 2011, Cooper said that Harrison "fought for a very long time to extract Little Malcolm from the official receivers", adding that its entry in the Berlin festival was only possible because the festival was an artistic forum and not finance-related.

The film was shot primarily in Lancashire, in the north of England, during February and March 1973.

== Soundtrack ==
Harrison supplied incidental music for the soundtrack and, after being introduced to the duo Splinter by their manager Mal Evans, produced their song "Lonely Man" for inclusion in a pivotal scene. The soundtrack also featured the band Harpoon singing "Not With You".

== Release ==
Once the Beatles' partnership had been formally dissolved, in January 1975, the film received a brief run in London's West End. In February 1983, Harrison donated his personal copy of Little Malcolm to a New York-based company for screening at a local film festival.

== Reception ==
Tom MIlne wrote in The Monthly Film Bulletin:

The performances ... are a real pleasure: John Hurt as the diminutive Führer, all hair and bluster masking a shy gazelle; John McEnery, angular and simmering with suppressed violence as the only real potential terrorist in the group; Raymond Platt as the round-eyed, chubby-faced archetype of the hoi polloi; and above all, David Warner as the disaster area Nipple.

Kim Newman wrote in Sight and Sound :

Hurt, producers Harrison and Gavrik Losey, screenwriter Derek Woodward and director Stuart Cooper were compelled to put together this film version, shot in chilly Oldham in a disused gasworks ... with few concessions to realism. Speeches run on like demented party pieces, with Hurt fulminating non-stop and Warner spinning out a bizarre fantasy of an encounter in which Nipple – trousers tucked into socks that serve as bicycle clips, hood always up in a manner once seen as silly rather than threatening – presents himself as an erotic dynamo.

Variety wrote called it "a frequently hilarious, generally thought-provoking and sobering, beautifully acted, but a trifle overlong and repetitious film of uncertain destination, being a bit too special for general audiences and – in some passages – too rough for primetime vidspectators."

== Accolades ==
After what Cooper described as an "incredible" reception at Berlin for "this very British film", Little Malcolm won a gold medal at the Atlanta Film Festival in August 1974. It was entered into the 24th Berlin International Film Festival, where it won the Silver Bear.

== Home media ==
In 2011, the British Film Institute released the film on DVD as part of their flipside strand.

== Sources ==
- Keith Badman, The Beatles Diary Volume 2: After the Break-Up 1970–2001, Omnibus Press (London, 2001; ISBN 0-7119-8307-0).
- Alan Clayson, George Harrison, Sanctuary (London, 2003; ISBN 1-86074-489-3).
- Peter Doggett, You Never Give Me Your Money: The Beatles After the Breakup, It Books (New York, NY, 2011; ISBN 978-0-06-177418-8).
- Bob Woffinden, The Beatles Apart, Proteus (London, 1981; ISBN 0-906071-89-5).
