= Carl Zeiss Planar 50mm f/0.7 =

Aperture lens

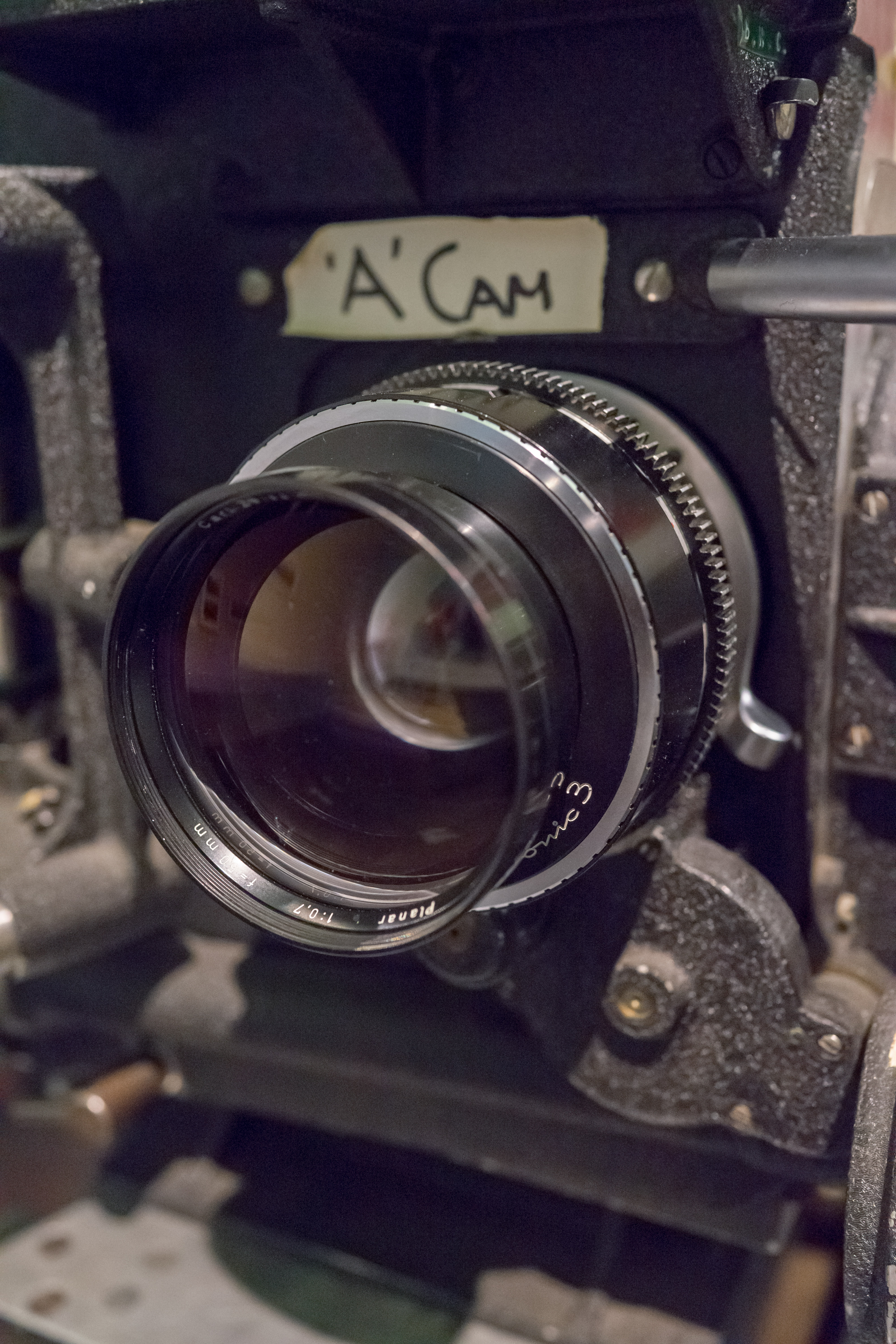
- Lens attached to camera as used for Stanley Kubrick's Barry Lyndon
- Maker: Zeiss

Technical data
- Focal length: 50
- Image format: full-frame
- Aperture (max/min): f/0.7
- Construction: 8 elements in 2 groups

History
- Introduction: 1966

The Carl Zeiss Planar 50mm f/0.7 is one of the largest relative aperture (fastest) lenses in the history of photography. The lens was developed for the NASA Apollo lunar program in 1966. It was rumored to have been made specifically to capture the far side of the Moon, but Zeiss themselves have said, "There is no evidence to support the myth."

Stanley Kubrick used these lenses when shooting his film Barry Lyndon, which allowed him to shoot scenes lit only by candlelight.

In total there were only ten lenses made. One was kept by Carl Zeiss, six were sold to NASA, and three were sold to Kubrick.

== See also ==
- Zeiss Planar
