= All Neat in Black Stockings =

1969 British film by Christopher Morahan

- Theatrical release poster
- Directed by: Christopher Morahan
- Screenplay by: Jane Gaskell; Hugh Whitemore
- Produced by: Leon Clore; John Arnold
- Starring: Victor Henry; Susan George; Jack Shepherd
- Cinematography: Larry Pizer
- Edited by: Misha Norland
- Music by: Robert Cornford
- Production company: Miron Films
- Distributed by: Anglo-Amalgamated
- Release date: 1969
- Running time: 95 minutes
- Country: United Kingdom

All Neat in Black Stockings is a 1969 British comedy-drama directed by Christopher Morahan and starring Victor Henry, Susan George and Jack Shepherd. The screenplay was by Jane Gaskell and Hugh Whitemore based on Gaskell's 1966 novel of the same title. An easygoing window cleaner falls in love with a woman he meets in Swinging London.

The movie was the sole lead role for Victor Henry, an acclaimed stage actor.

== Plot ==
Ginger is a window cleaner with an eye for the girls. His best friend and neighbour, Dwyer, swaps girls with him. Ginger is cleaning hospital windows and he sets up a date with nurse Babette. A patient gives Ginger the keys to his house and asks him to care for his pets during his hospital stay. Ginger takes Babette to the local pub but his interest wanders to Carole and Jill. He sets up a date with Carole and later that night he switches his date with Dwyer.

Ginger cares for Mr. McLaughlin's birds, rabbits, white rats and many aquaria. This home is far nicer than Ginger's run down bedsit. His pushy brother-in-law moves in with Ginger's pregnant sister, Cecily. Issur even moves in with his girlfriend, Jocasta. Ginger's passive and uncomplaining sister seems not to object.

Ginger takes Carole ice skating, but his interest moves to her friend, Jill. He starts seeing Jill and even buys her a large plush penguin. He meets Jill's mother and Dwyer sees a difference in his friend. Ginger does not even try to have sex with Jill. Jill and her mother live together and Ginger befriends Mum.

Issur decides to have a large unauthorised party in the borrowed residence. Angry Ginger shows up and starts to kick people out of the house, which has been trashed. Later that night, Ginger finds Jill in bed with Dwyer. She has lost her virginity to Dwyer, who thought nothing was wrong because they always slept with each other's women. Brother-in-law goes off to Mexico with Jocasta and Jill ends up pregnant by Dwyer.

Gunge returns from hospital to find his pets hungry and possessions damaged. He nonetheless hires Cecily as his housekeeper. Despite all, Ginger decides to marry Jill, and makes a deposit on a rental property, but Jill decides they will live with her mother. Jill has the baby and Ginger says it looks like Dwyer. Ginger continues work cleaning windows and stops for lunch at a café. The waitress is young and pretty and Ginger flirts with her and the movie ends.

== Cast ==
- Victor Henry as Ginger
- Susan George as Jillian
- Jack Shepherd as Dwyer
- Clare Kelly as Jill's mother
- Anna Cropper as Cicely
- Harry Towb as Issur
- Vanessa Forsyth as Carole
- Terence De Marney as Old Gunge
- Jasmina Hilton as Nurse Babette
- John Woodnutt as vicar
- Nita Lorraine as Jocasta, Issur's girlfriend
- Deirdre Costello as new bird
- Andre Dakar as man with parrot
- Rosalind Elliot as new bird
- Gwendolyn Watts as suburban housewife
- Anna Welsh as hospital Sister
- Neil Wilson as angry householder
- Christine Pryor as cafe waitress
- Graham James as young bloke
- Eric Longworth as businessman
- Malcolm Tierney as photographer
- Maurice Travers as car salesman
- Carmen Munroe as nurse
- Larry Dann as new mate

== Production ==
The novel was published in 1966. Jane Gaskell based it in part on her husband's experiences as a window cleaner.

Though Jane Gaskell co-wrote the screenplay, the film plays up Ginger's bawdy escapades, while excising Jill's suicide attempt entirely.

Freddie Francis says a producer tried to make the film with Francis as director but was unable to find finance as Francis was considered a horror director.

Film rights were obtained by Leon Clore, who had produced Morgan. He originally offered the film to Lindsay Anderson to direct but Anderson turned it down.

Filming started in June 1968 in London and went for about 13 weeks. Producer John Clore described it as a "contemporary sex comedy" with elements of Alfie.

== Critical reception ==
The Daily Mirror called it "a tepid story" that "hardly seems to have been worth making at all."

The Monthly Film Bulletin wrote: "Although a little uncertain in mood, and basically the kind of subject done to death by Swinging British Cinema in its heyday, this is an oddly appealing film. One could have done without the old tramp, his Aladdin's cave, and the sentimental subplot in which he figures; but at least all this provides a picaresque framework through which the acid little morality play about innocence deceived (where the innocent becomes the deceiver) rings out all the more wittily and bitterly, beautifully played by Victor Henry and Susan George. Above all, directing mercifully straight and without a psychedelic in sight, Christopher Morahan allows his excellent supporting cast to make the most of the often witty dialogue. Particularly good are Jack Shepherd ... Anna Cropper as the bovine Sis, ... and Clare Kelly as the mother-in-law, somehow managing to make "Will you have a glass of sherry?" sound like a whole squad of nails being driven into the marital coffin."

Variety wrote: "Henry brings some humor and guts to the anti-hero's role and Jack Shepherd, top featured as his mate, is a laconic, personable newcomer. The shrewish mother (Clare Kelly) is an overwritten role, and others brought in have little substance or relevance to the main issue. ... Heroine Susan George gives a subdued performance, pleasant but pallid. Miss George is being built up as one of the new young hopefuls and may well have what it takes, given less cardboard roles. Director Christopher Morahan ... gives the film little spark, but technically, despite the drab settings, the film just lacks wit and depth."

Leslie Halliwell said: "Modish comedy drama with surface entaintainment of a sort, but no depth"

Filmink argued "perhaps it was made a few years too late."
