= Wray (lenses) =

1850–1971 British camera and lens manufacturer

Wray (Optical Works) Ltd.
- Founded: 1850; 176 years ago
- Founder: W. Wray
- Defunct: 1971
- Headquarters: Bromley, Kent, United Kingdom

Wray (Optical Works) Ltd. was a British camera and lens manufacturer based in Ashgrove Road, Bromley, Kent, UK. It operated from 1850 to 1971, making lenses for cameras, photographic enlargers, reconnaissance, mapping, microchip replication, and an anamorphic projection system for cinemas. It also made binoculars.

== History ==
W. Wray founded his optical company in 1850 initially making microscope lenses. By at least the 1880s it was making lenses for cameras. The company had a reputation for producing excellent quality lenses and durable quality cameras including models such as the Wrayflex. Many Wray lenses remain in use, especially in photographic enlargers.

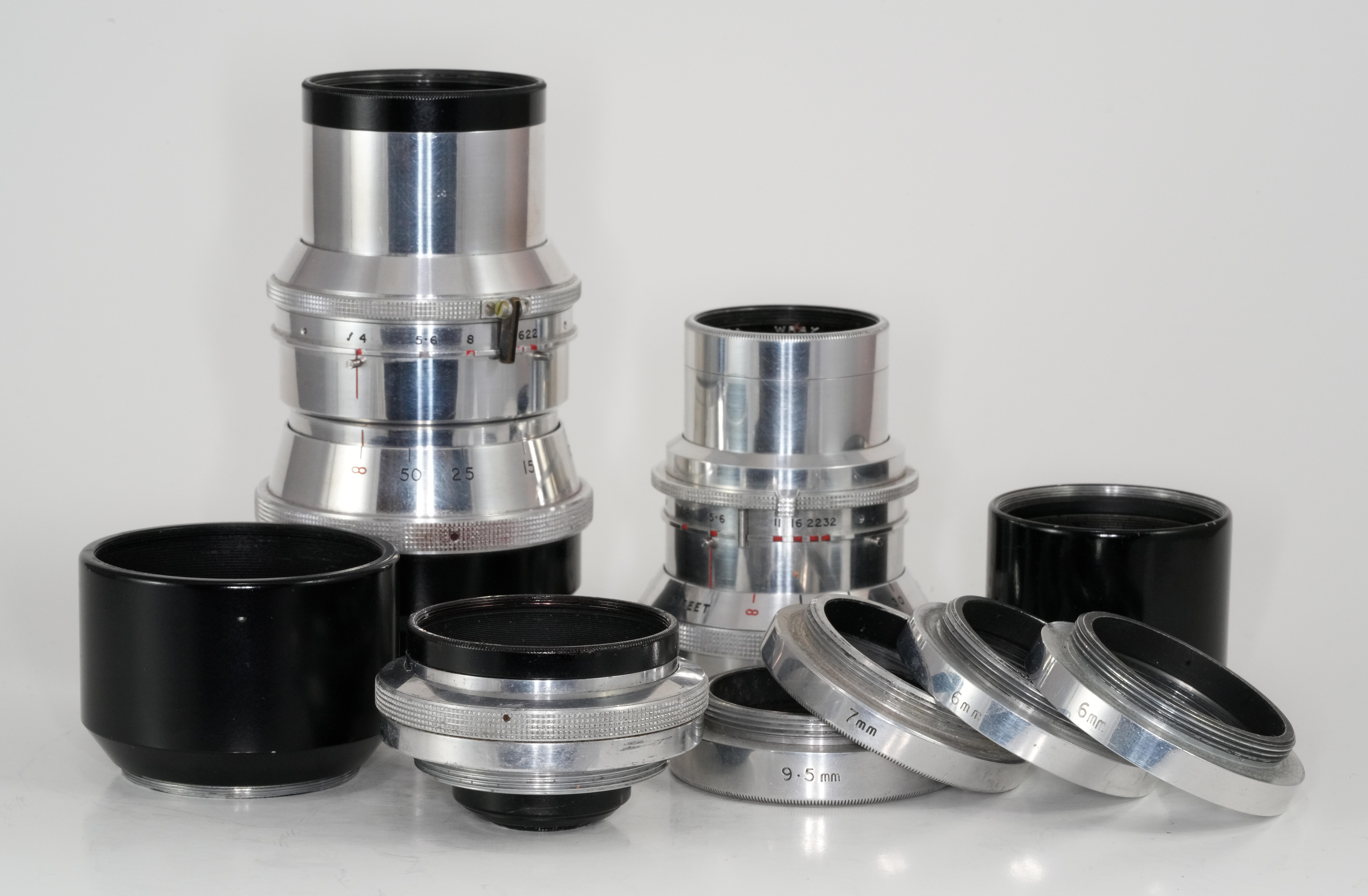
Lenses for the Wrayflex

Wray also made aerial reconnaissance lenses. Their 36" f/6.3 is particularly good but has some residual spherical aberration at full aperture. They also made a highly distortion-free 36" f/4 for mapping. This can only be used with an orange filter and orthochromatic film to avoid the residual secondary spectrum (chromatic aberration).

Other products included the 12" Wide Angle Lustrar Code A 30010, Focusing Magnifiers, 4" F.10 APO Lustrar Code A 10010, and Wray Process Prisms.

Arthur Smith was the managing director and owner of the company, which had been created by his father, who left the Ross Optical Company to start it, initially as a small unit in Peckham.

Both World Wars caused the company to grow in size, due to the manufacture of service instruments such as binoculars.

Probably the most sophisticated lens produced by Wray was a 135 mm f/4.5 which has the unusual feature of a triple correction for astigmatism. It was designed by Charles Wynne, who was Wray's head optical designer at the time, having joined the company in 1943. In later years he went on to become a professor at Imperial College London, Optical department.

Wray had a specific development shop for unusual products, which was substantially replicated by Wynne at Imperial College.

Subsequent to this, David Day was appointed the technical director of Wray, heading a specialist optical design team. During this period, Wray developed special lenses for CERN and for microchip replication, with advanced features which probably accelerated the early development of microelectronics. Among many other projects, he developed an anamorphic projection system for cinemas, based on Brewster prisms.

Wray was closed in 1971 still in profit, its assets were worth more than the company
