= David Halliwell =

British dramatist (1936–2006)

David William Halliwell (31 July 1936, Brighouse, Yorkshire – c. 16 March 2006, Charlbury, Oxfordshire) was a British dramatist.

== Early life ==
Halliwell attended Huddersfield College of Art (1953–59) as an art student, but was expelled for a time from the institution, and later switched to acting at RADA. It was there that Halliwell first met Mike Leigh. According to Leigh, the other students "were mostly posh kids and it was terribly old-fashioned and twee, not like it is now, but there was a scruff element. John Hurt was there, David Warner was there. Me, Halliwell, Ken Campbell and a few other renegades."

In the early 1960s he worked as an actor in rep and was a stage manager at the Nottingham Playhouse for a time.

== Little Malcolm and His Struggle Against the Eunuchs ==
His experiences at the Huddersfield College were the basis for his earliest produced and best remembered play, Little Malcolm and His Struggle Against the Eunuchs. In this play Malcolm Scrawdyke, a Hitlerite figure, plots revenge against authority for his college expulsion by forming the Party of Dynamic Erection with his three acolytes. "The Nazis made a big impression on people of my age", Halliwell recalled. "They almost destroyed Europe. But as well as being pretty threatening they were also seen as a laughing stock even during the war." The play won Halliwell the Evening Standard's Most Promising Playwright Award in 1967.

Malcolm's premier production at the Unity Theatre in 1965 was directed by Mike Leigh with Halliwell himself in the central role of Malcolm. Lasting six hours in this version, the production's run was short. Taken up by producer Michael Codron and reduced to a more manageable length, John Hurt now featured as the character in a West End production. On Broadway, the play was retitled Hail Scrawdyke! and starred Victor Henry Both were short runs. A feature film version followed, Little Malcolm (1974), again with Hurt in the lead. A successful revival in 1998 starred Ewan McGregor.

== Later work ==
In 1968 Halliwell jointly set up a company named Quipu (an Inca communication tool) which performed at various London theatres until 1973. Its stated aim reflected the radical politics of the time: "a new kind of organisation in which the means of production are owned, controlled and developed by the artists whose work is being produced". Quipu, "the first lunchtime theatre club in London", allowed the tryout of short plays. It was a form of "devised theatre" which Mike Leigh, recalling Halliwell in 2015, thought his friend's personality was incompatible: "His relationship with the actors wasn’t about growing and enabling, but about dictating, so the plays were always somewhat inorganic. The writer was there, though. He had great ideas – perceptive to the highest degree and witty, too."

Halliwell received the 1977 John Whiting Award for his play Prejudice. The award was presented to him in December 1978 by Harold Pinter. In 1967, A Who's Who of Flapland starring Alfred Marks and Wilfred Pickles was broadcast on the BBC Third Programme, beginning Halliwell's long association with radio plays. It was adapted for theatre two years later and presented with two other short plays.

Halliwell's other stage plays include K.D. Dufford (1969).

Halliwell researched the professional relationship of Maurice Wilkins and Rosalind Franklin, both involved in the discovery of DNA, in the 1980s, but his work was not completed, although the recordings of people he interviewed have been preserved.

He contributed several television scripts to several of the BBC's anthology series, including Play for Today, and wrote (an unproduced serial) for Doctor Who.

In 1999, Halliwell directed the premiere of his play One Sez This Then the Other Sez That at the Tristan Bates Theatre at the Actors Centre in London. It starred Jill Howson and Philip Relph.

== Plays ==
- Little Malcolm and His Struggle Against the Eunuchs (1965)
- A Who's Who of Flapland (1967)
- The Experiment (1967) co-devised with David Calderisi
- A Discussion (1969)
- Muck from Three Angles (1970)
- K. D. Dufford Hears K. D. Dufford Ask K. D. Dufford How K. D. Dufford’ll Make K. D. Dufford
- Bleats from a Brighouse Pleasureground (1972)
- Janitress Thrilled by Prehensile Penis (1972)
- Prejudice (1977) later retitled Creatures of Another Kind
- A Rite Kwik Metal Ta-Ta (1979)
- The House (1979)
- Was it Her?
- Spongehenge (1982)
- Grandad's Place
- Shares of the Pudding
- Do It Yourself
- Bedsprings (1989)
- Parts
- There's a Car Park in Witherton (1992)
- Crossed Lines
- Bird (1995)
- One Sez This Then the Other Sez That (1999)
