= Waterford Castle =

Castle in Ireland

Coordinates: 52.253°N 7.057°W

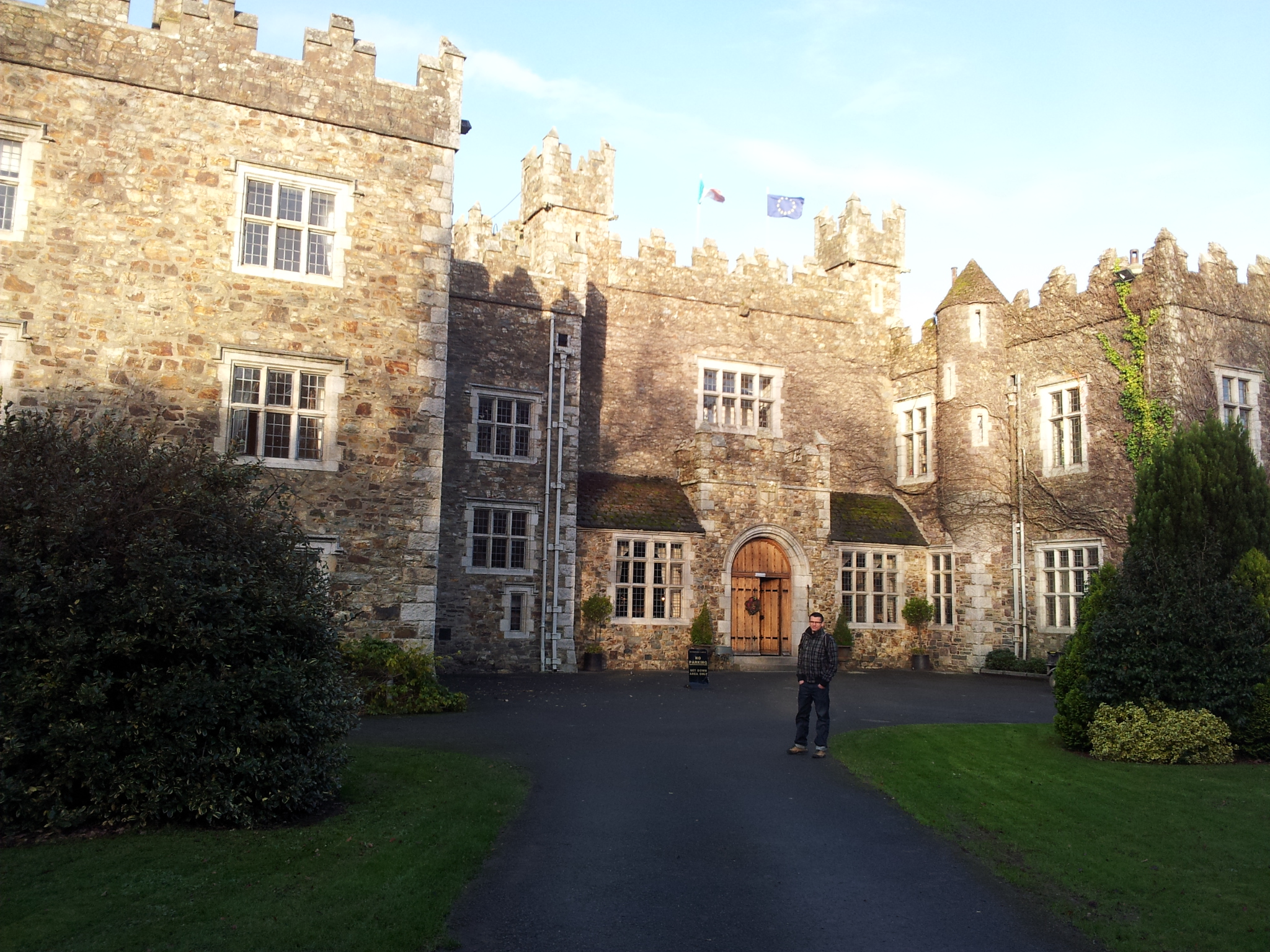
Waterford Castle entrance

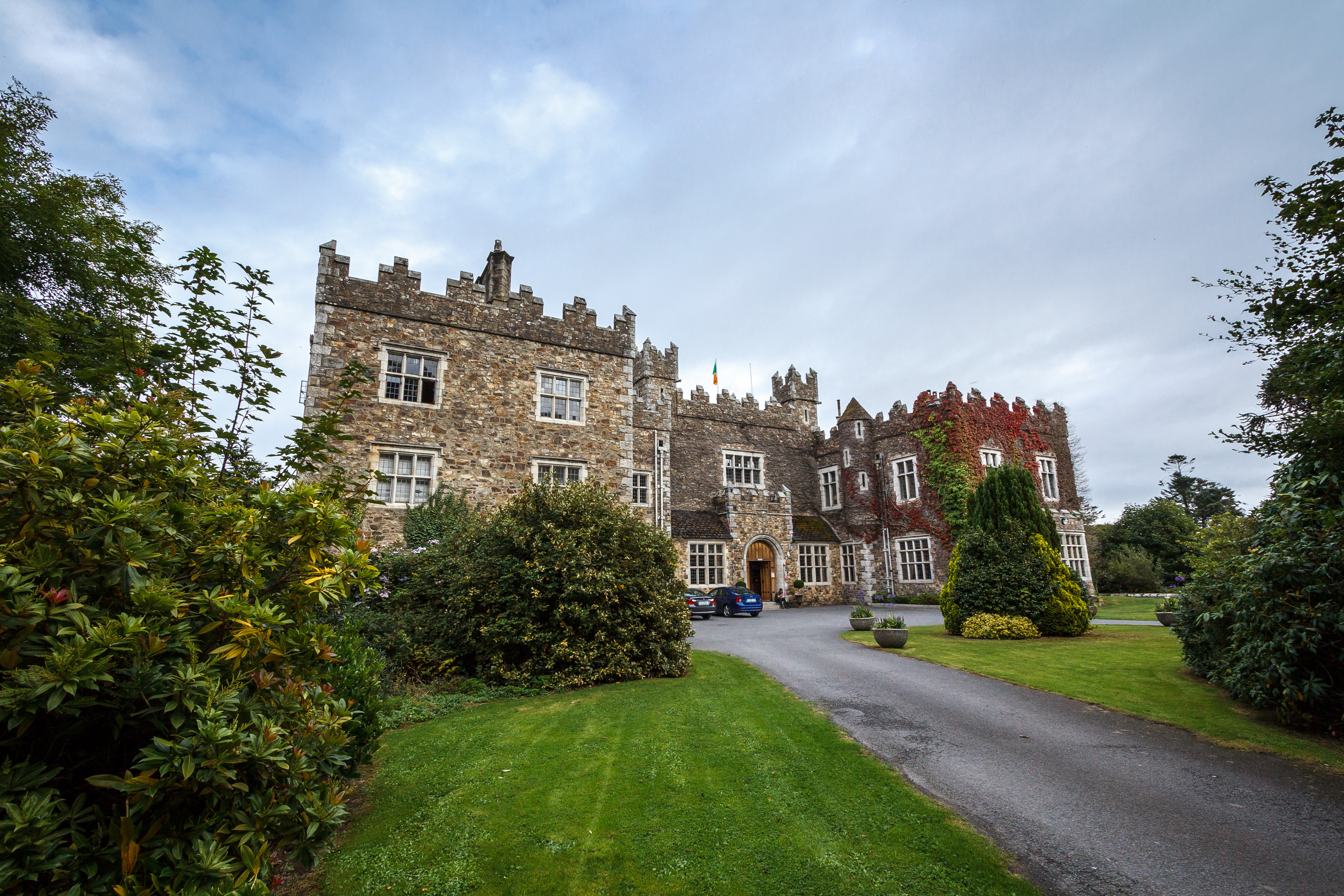
Waterford Castle

Waterford Castle is a historic house on Little Island in Waterford, Ireland. The house was owned by a branch of the Fitzgerald family for hundreds of years, but was developed into a hotel in the 1980s.

== Earlier castle ==
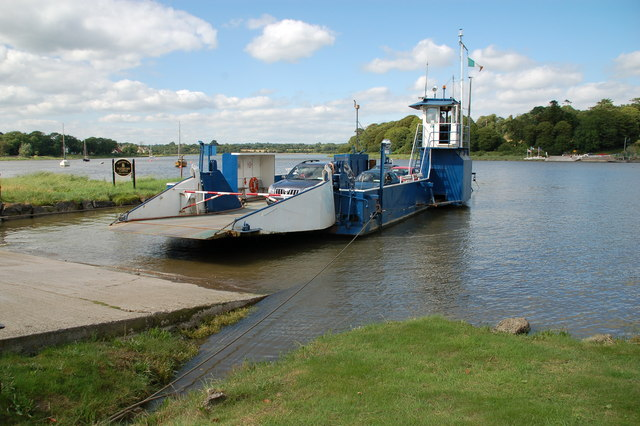
Little Island Ferry

The original Fitzgerald castle was probably a tower-house or fortified house and was described as a square building with battlements erected in the 16th century, with a pointed doorway and a window flanked by a stone head. The branch of the Fitzgerald family that owned Waterford Castle were the descendants of Patrick Fitzgerald, son of the de jure 6th Earl of Kildare.

== Current house ==
The current castle is a Gothic-style house built in 1895 for Gerald Purcell-Fitzgerald (1865-1946) which incorporates the fabric of an earlier (pre-1845) house, and parts of the medieval (pre-1645) tower-house. The designs were prepared by Romayne Walker and supervised by Albert Murrary (1849 - 1924). The construction is in unrefined rubble stone with fine cut-stone quoins and window frames and topped with Irish-style battlements.
