= Noktor =

Camera lens manufacturer

Noktor was a manufacturer of a 50mm f/0.95 HyperPrime manual-focus lens for the Micro Four Thirds system. Noktor's lenses went on sale in April 2010 and were the only type of lens faster than f/0.95 manufactured at the time.
