= Stuart Cooper =

American filmmaker, actor and writer (born 1942)

- Born: Stuart W. Cooper; 1942; Hoboken, New Jersey, U.S.
- Years active: 1970–Present
- Spouse: Kelly Cooper

Stuart W. Cooper (born 1942) is an American filmmaker, actor and writer.

== Career ==
Cooper was a resident of the United Kingdom in the 1960s and 1970s where his most notable film appearance was as one of The Dirty Dozen, Roscoe Lever, in 1967. His other film roles included I'll Never Forget What's'isname (1967) as one of Oliver Reed's film crew, and Subterfuge (1968) starring Gene Barry and Joan Collins.

Overlord, his 1975 WWII collage docudrama, originally failed to get US theatrical distribution and was only shown there in select screenings and on television (including a run on California's Z Channel in 1982, which was highlighted in the acclaimed 2004 TV documentary film Z Channel: A Magnificent Obsession).

== Accolades ==
His 1974 film Little Malcolm was entered into the 24th Berlin International Film Festival, where it won the Silver Bear. The following year, Overlord won the Silver Bear – Special Jury Prize at the 25th Berlin Festival.

== Filmography ==
As director

Short films
Title	Year
A Test of Violence	1969

Feature films
Title	Year
Kelly Country	1973
Little Malcolm	1974
Overlord	1975
The Disappearance	1977
Christmas Eve	1986
Payoff	1991
One Special Victory	1991
Rubdown	1993
Dancing with Danger	1994
Bitter Vengeance	1994
Out of Annie's Past	1995
Dead Ahead	1996
Bloodhounds II	1996
The Ticket	1997
The Hunted	1998
Chameleon	1998
The Hustle	2000
Magic Man	2010
The Investigation	2016

TV films
Title	Year
The Long Hot Summer	1985
A.D.	1985
Christmas Eve	1986
The Fortunate Pilgrim	1988

As actor

Title	Year	Role	Notes
The Dirty Dozen	1967	Roscoe Lever	
I'll Never Forget What's'isname	1967	Lewis Force	
Subterfuge	1968	Dubrossman	
