= Patric Knowles =

English actor (1911–1995)

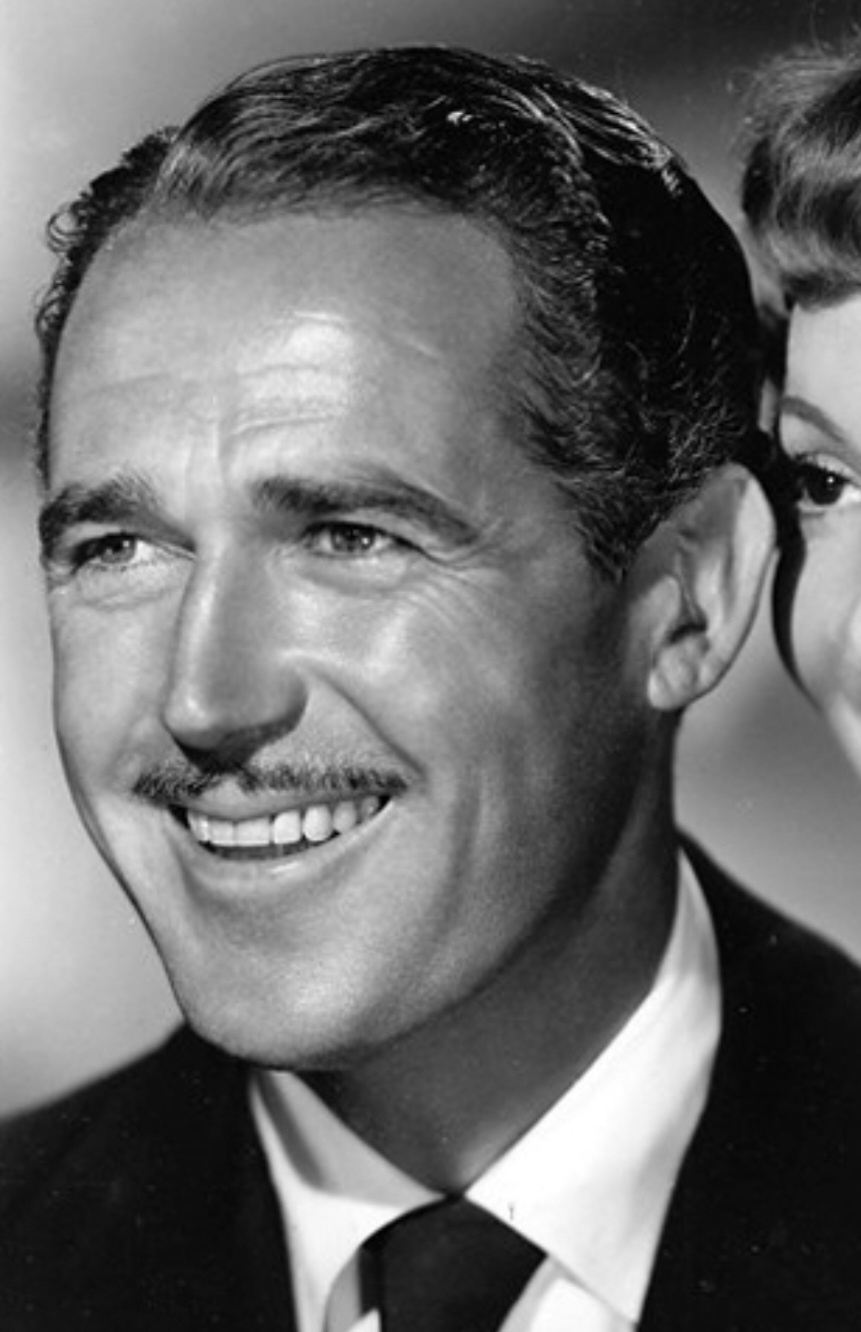
- Knowles in 1950
- Born: Reginald Lawrence Knowles; 11 November 1911; Horsforth, West Riding of Yorkshire, England
- Died: 23 December 1995 (aged 84); Woodland Hills, California, U.S.
- Occupation: Actor
- Years active: 1932–1973
- Spouse: Enid Percival (m. 1935)
- Children: 2

Patric Knowles (born Reginald Lawrence Knowles; 11 November 1911 – 23 December 1995) was an English film actor. Born in Horsforth, West Riding of Yorkshire, he later changed his name to reflect his Irish heritage. He made his film debut in 1932, and played either first or second film leads throughout his career. He appeared in films from the 1930s to the 1970s.

== Career ==
=== British acting career ===
Knowles began his acting career with the British sound films early in 1932, calling himself Patric Knowles. He made his film debut in Men of Tomorrow (1932), produced by Alexander Korda.

He later joined the repertory group of the Oxford Playhouse theater and began touring with various companies and was involved in some seasons in regional theater, being featured in 14 British films, including The Poisoned Diamond (1933), directed by W. P. Kellino; Norah O'Neale (1934), directed by Brian Desmond Hurst; Regal Cavalcade (1935); and The Girl in the Crowd (1935), directed by Michael Powell.

He had the male lead in The Student's Romance (1935) with Grete Natzler and Honours Easy (1935) with Greta Nissen and was in Abdul the Damned (1935), Mister Hobo (1935) with George Arliss, Wrath of Jealousy (1936), and Two's Company (1936).

After a few tours Knowles went to London and appeared in By Appointment in 1936, where he was spotted by Irving Asher of Warner Bros. and got a Hollywood contract for more than 2 years. He had the lead in his final British films, The Brown Wallet (1936), directed by Powell; Fair Exchange (1936), directed by Ralph Ince; and Crown v. Stevens (1936), directed by Powell.

=== Warner Bros ===
Knowles' first American film was Give Me Your Heart (1936) with Kay Francis (released in Great Britain as Sweet Aloes.) Knowles was cast as a titled Englishman of means.

His second film for Warners was The Charge of the Light Brigade (1936), where he played the younger brother of Errol Flynn, who was loved by Olivia de Havilland. Knowles returned to England to make Irish for Luck (1936), and then supported Bette Davis in It's Love I'm After (1937).

Knowles was top billed in some B pictures at Warners: Expensive Husbands (1937) and The Patient in Room 18 (1938). He was re-teamed with Flynn and De Havilland in The Adventures of Robin Hood (1938), playing Will Scarlett, and again with the pair in Four's a Crowd (1938). He supported Flynn and Bette Davis in The Sisters (1938). Knowles had supporting roles in two more B pictures before leaving the studio: Heart of the North (1938) and Torchy Blane in Chinatown (1939).

Republic Pictures borrowed Knowles to play the lead in Storm Over Bengal (1938).

=== RKO ===
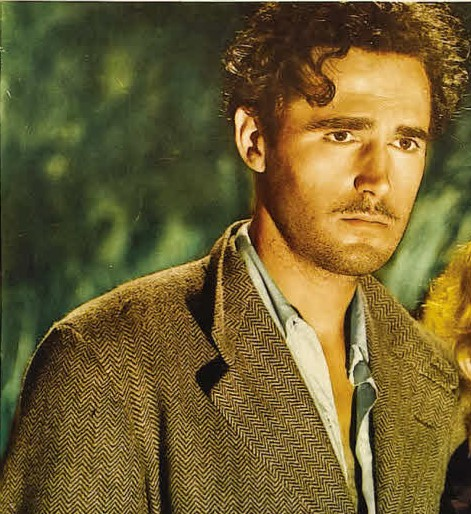
Knowles in Five Came Back (1939)

Knowles signed a contract at RKO, for whom he made Beauty for the Asking (1939) with Lucille Ball; Five Came Back (1939) also with Ball, directed by John Farrow; and The Spellbinder (1939).

He went to MGM for Another Thin Man (1939) with William Powell and Myrna Loy and 20th Century-Fox for The Honeymoon's Over (1939). He was back at RKO for two more films with John Farrow: Married and in Love (1940) and a remake of A Bill of Divorcement (1940) with Maureen O'Hara and Adolphe Menjou. They were followed by Anne of Windy Poplars (1941), playing Gilbert Blythe.

Again at 20th Century-Fox, he was in How Green Was My Valley (1941) for John Ford.

=== Universal ===
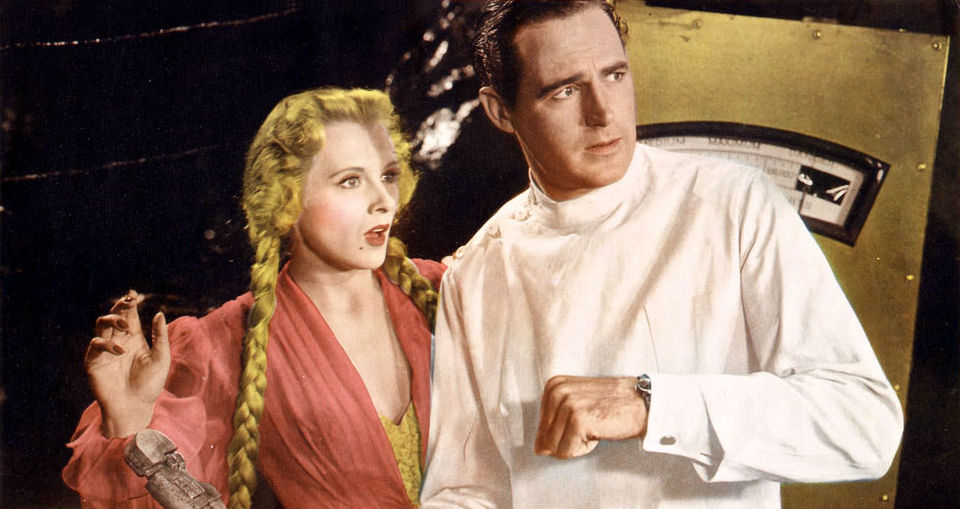
Ilona Massey and Knowles in Frankenstein Meets the Wolf Man

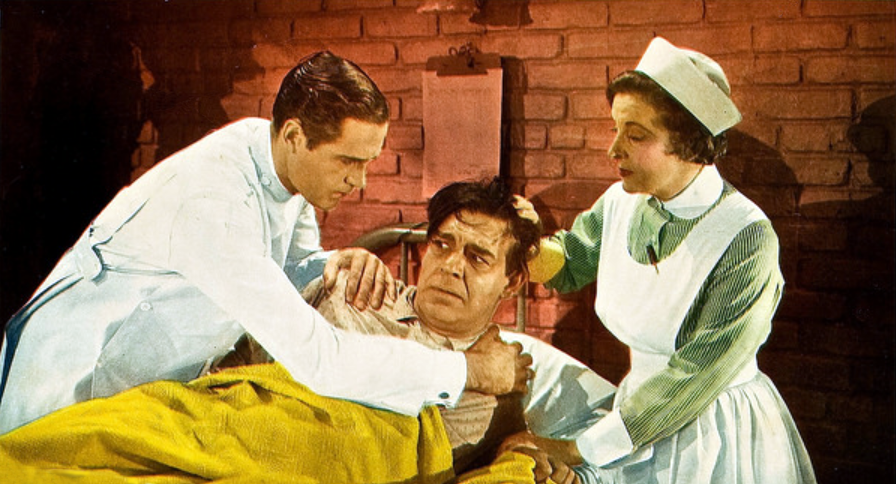
Knowles, Lon Chaney Jr. and Doris Lloyd in Frankenstein Meets the Wolf Man (1943)

Knowles went to Universal for a support part in The Wolf Man (1941) with Lon Chaney Jr. and Claude Rains. He went to Republic for Women in War (1941) then was top billed in Universal's The Strange Case of Doctor Rx (1942), and Mystery of Marie Roget (1942) with Maria Montez.

He supported Irene Dunne in Gregory La Cava's Lady in a Jam (1942) with Ralph Bellamy and Eugene Pallette, Constance Bennett in Sin Town (1942), Abbott and Costello in Who Done It? (1942) and Hit the Ice (1943), Ilona Massey in Frankenstein Meets the Wolf Man (1943) with Lon Chaney Jr. and Bela Lugosi, Rosemary Lane in All by Myself (1943), The Andrews Sisters in Always a Bridesmaid (1943), Olsen and Johnson in Crazy House (1943), Donald O'Connor and Peggy Ryan in Chip Off the Old Block (1944) and This Is the Life (1944), and Gloria Jean in Pardon My Rhythm (1944).

=== Paramount ===
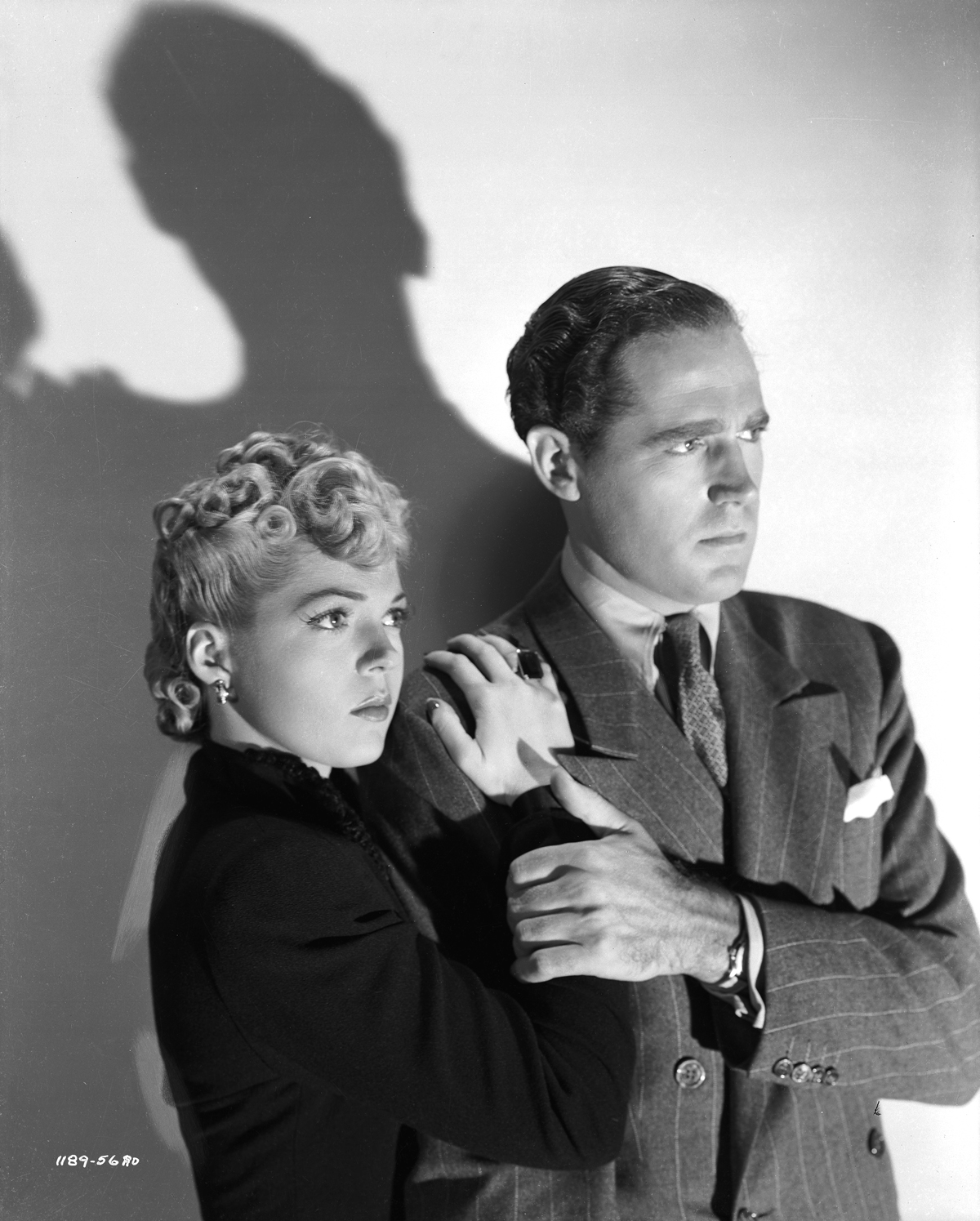
With Anne Gwynne, 1942

Knowles went to Paramount where he supported Paulette Goddard and Ray Milland in Kitty (1945), Dorothy Lamour in Masquerade in Mexico (1945), Barbara Stanwyck in The Bride Wore Boots (1946), and Alan Ladd in O.S.S. (1946).

He went to Warners for Of Human Bondage (1946) and Universal borrowed him to play Joan Fontaine's leading man in the thriller Ivy (1947). He went back to Paramount for Monsieur Beaucaire (1946) with Bob Hope, Variety Girl (1947) with practically every performer on the Paramount lot, Dream Girl (1948), and Isn't It Romantic? (1949).

Knowles went to RKO for The Big Steal (1949) with Robert Mitchum, Jane Greer and William Bendix, and 20th Century-Fox for Three Came Home (1950), second billed, playing Claudette Colbert's husband.

=== Television ===
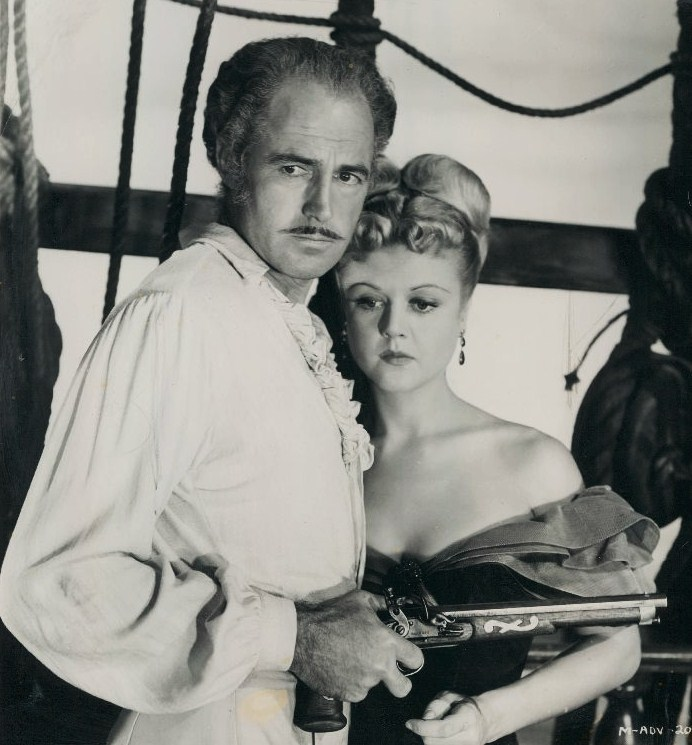
Knowles and Angela Lansbury in Mutiny (1952)

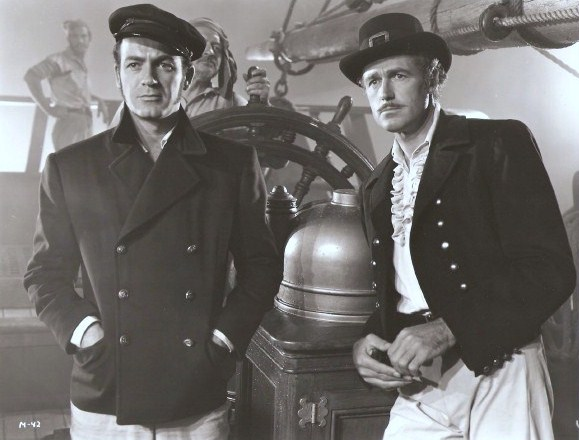
Mark Stevens and Knowles, 1952

Knowles began appearing on TV shows such as The Bigelow Theatre, Studio One in Hollywood, Lights Out, Hollywood Opening Night, Robert Montgomery Presents, The Revlon Mirror Theater, The United States Steel Hour, The Whistler, Studio 57, The Ford Television Theatre, and Jane Wyman Presents The Fireside Theatre.

He still appeared in features such as Quebec (1951), Mutiny (1952), Tarzan's Savage Fury (1952) (as the villain), Jamaica Run (1953), Flame of Calcutta (1953) for Sam Katzman (second billed to Denise Darcel), World for Ransom (1954), Khyber Patrol (1954) and No Man's Woman (1955).

From the late 1950s Knowles became an almost exclusively television actor appearing in Star Stage, The 20th Century-Fox Hour, Tales of the 77th Bengal Lancers , Ethel Barrymore Theatre, Lux Video Theatre, Matinee Theatre, Schlitz Playhouse, The Millionaire, Lux Playhouse, Walt Disney's Wonderful World of Color, Wagon Train, General Electric Theater, 77 Sunset Strip, Tightrope, Maverick in episodes "The Wrecker" with James Garner and Jack Kelly and "Guatemala City" with James Garner, The Barbara Stanwyck Show, Klondike, The Jim Backus Show, Death Valley Days, The Islanders, Checkmate, Peter Gunn, Whispering Smith, Hawaiian Eye, Have Gun – Will Travel (as Phileas Fogg in the episode "Foggbound", and as August in “Savages”) with Richard Boone, Gunsmoke, The Rogues, Mickey with Mickey Rooney, and Jericho.

He had a small role in the feature Band of Angels (1957) with Clark Gable and Sidney Portier, From the Earth to the Moon (1958) and Auntie Mame (1958) with Rosalind Russell.

=== Later career ===
Knowles' later appearances included television guest star roles on Family Affair, Garrison's Gorillas, and Marcus Welby, M.D.. He appeared in three films for director Andrew McLaglen,The Way West (1967) with Kirk Douglas and Robert Mitchum, as Lord Mountbatten in The Devil's Brigade (1968) with William Holden and Cliff Robertson, and as John Tunstall in Chisum (1970) with John Wayne. He also appeared in In Enemy Country (1968) with Tony Franciosa, D.A.: Murder One (1969), Getting Together (1971), The Man (1972) with James Earl Jones, Terror in the Wax Museum (1973) with Ray Milland and Elsa Lanchester, and Arnold (1973) with Stella Stevens.

Knowles was inducted into the Hollywood Walk of Fame under the category Television on 8 February 1960.

== Personal life ==
Knowles met Gladys Enid Percival when both appeared together at the Playhouse Theater in Oxford, England. He married the 23-year-old on 3 October 1935. Under contract to Warner Studios, in 1936 they moved to New York City. In 1939, the couple moved to Tarzana in Los Angeles, California, USA.

Sometime after 1936, Knowles became interested in flying, which led him to enlist in the Royal Canadian Air Force. He had hundreds of hours of flying experience, but because an eye ailment prevented him from flying, he became an instructor. After returning to Hollywood, while between films he served as a civilian flying instructor with the U.S. Army Air Force at the Mira Loma Academy for air cadets at Oxnard, California.

In 1940, a limerick circulated about Knowles: How pleasant to know Patric Knowles/ Who is the kindest of souls/ But being handsome and a British swell/ Nobody expects him to act very well/ Which is why he never gets good roles.

Knowles and his wife Enid had a daughter, Antonia Vaughan, and a son, Michael.

Knowles wrote a novel, Even Steven (Vantage Press, 1960, ASIN B0006RMC2G).

=== Death ===
Knowles died at age 84 from a brain hemorrhage at West Hills Regional Medical Center in West Hills, California on 23 December 1995.

== Partial filmography ==
Year	Film	Role	Director	Notes
1932	Men of Tomorrow		Leontine Sagan	
1933	The Poisoned Diamond	Jack Dane	W.P. Kellino	
1934	Irish Hearts	Pip Fitzgerald	Brian Desmond Hurst	
1935	Royal Cavalcade	Army Officer	Marcel Varnel	
1935	The Girl in the Crowd	Tom Burrows	Michael Powell	
1935	The Student's Romance	Max Brandt	Otto Kanturek	
1935	Honours Easy	Harry Markham	Herbert Brenon	
1935	Abdul the Damned	Hilmi's Attaché	Karl Grune	
1935	The Guv'nor	Paul	Milton Rosmer	
1936	Wedding Group	Robert Smith	Campbell Gullan	
1936	Two's Company	Lord Jerry Wendower	Tim Whelan	
1936	Fair Exchange	Tony Meredith	Ralph Ince	
1936	The Brown Wallet	John Gillespie	Michael Powell	
1936	Crown v. Stevens	Chris Jensen	Michael Powell	
1936	Give Me Your Heart	Robert Melford	Archie Mayo	
1936	The Charge of the Light Brigade	Captain Perry Vickers	Michael Curtiz	
1936	Irish for Luck	Terry O'Ryan	Arthur B. Woods	
1937	It's Love I'm After	Henry Grant	Archie Mayo	
1937	Expensive Husbands	Prince Rupert Heinrich Franz Von Rentzau	Bobby Connolly	
1938	The Patient in Room 18	Lance O'Leary	Crane Wilbur	
1938	The Adventures of Robin Hood	Will Scarlett	Michael Curtiz; William Keighley	
1938	Four's a Crowd	Patterson Buckley	Michael Curtiz	
1938	The Sisters	Norman French	Anatole Litvak	
1938	Storm Over Bengal	Capt. Jeffrey Allison	Sidney Salkow	
1938	Heart of the North	Corporal Jim Montgomery	Lewis Seiler	
1939	Torchy Blane in Chinatown	Captain Condon	William Beaudine	
1939	Beauty for the Asking	Denny Williams	Glenn Tryon	
1939	Five Came Back	Judson Ellis	John Farrow	
1939	The Spellbinder	Tom Dixon	Jack Hively	
1939	Another Thin Man	Dudley Horn	W. S. Van Dyke	
1939	The Honeymoon's Over	Pat Shields	Eugene Forde	
1940	Married and in Love	Paul Wilding	John Farrow	
1940	A Bill of Divorcement	John Storm	John Farrow	
1940	Women in War	Lt. Larry Hall	John H. Auer	
1940	Anne of Windy Poplars	Gilbert Blythe	Jack Hively	
1941	How Green Was My Valley	Ivor	John Ford	
1941	The Wolf Man	Frank Andrews	George Waggner	
1942	The Strange Case of Doctor Rx	Jerry Church	William Nigh	
1942	The Mystery of Marie Roget	Dr. Paul Dupin	Philip Rosen	
1942	Lady in a Jam	Doctor Enright	Gregory La Cava	
1942	Sin Town	Wade Crowell	Ray Enright	
1942	Who Done It?	Jimmy Turner	Erle C. Kenton	Abbott & Costello film
1943	Forever and a Day	Trimble-Pomfret Son	René Clair; Edmund Goulding; Cedric Hardwicke; Frank Lloyd; Victor Saville; Robert Stevenson; Herbert Wilcox	
1943	Frankenstein Meets the Wolf Man	Dr. Mannering	Roy William Neill	
1943	Hit the Ice	Dr. Bill Elliot (Credits) / Dr. William 'Bill' Burns (in Film)	Charles Lamont	Abbott & Costello film
1943	All by Myself	Dr. Bill Perry	Felix E. Feist	
1943	Always a Bridesmaid	Tony Warren	Erle C. Kenton	
1943	Crazy House	Edmund 'Mac' MacLean	Edward F. Cline	
1944	Chip Off the Old Block	Commander Judd Corrigan	Charles Lamont	
1944	This Is the Life	Maj. Hilary Jarret	Felix E. Feist	
1944	Pardon My Rhythm	Tony Page	Felix E. Feist	
1945	Kitty	Brett Harwood Earl of Carstairs	Mitchell Leisen	
1945	Masquerade in Mexico	Thomas Grant	Mitchell Leisen	
1946	The Bride Wore Boots	Lance Gale	Irving Pichel	
1946	O.S.S.	Cmdr. Brady	Irving Pichel	
1946	Of Human Bondage	Harry Griffiths	Edmund Goulding	
1946	Monsieur Beaucaire	Duc le Chandre	George Marshall	
1947	Ivy	Roger Gretorex	Sam Wood	
1947	Variety Girl	Patric Knowles	George Marshall	
1948	Dream Girl	Jim Lucas	Mitchell Leisen	
1948	Isn't It Romantic?	Richard 'Rick' Brannon	Norman Z. McLeod	
1949	The Big Steal	Jim Fiske	Don Siegel	
1950	Three Came Home	Harry Keith	Jean Negulesco	
1951	Quebec	Charles Douglas	George Templeton	
1952	Mutiny	Capt. Ben Waldridge	Edward Dmytryk	
1952	Tarzan's Savage Fury	Edwards, English Traitor	Cy Endfield	
1953	Jamaica Run	William Montague	Lewis R. Foster	
1953	Flame of Calcutta	Capt. Keith Lambert	Seymour Friedman	
1954	World for Ransom	Julian March	Robert Aldrich (uncredited)	
1954	Khyber Patrol	Lt. George Kennedy	Seymour Friedman	
1955	No Man's Woman	Wayne Vincent	Franklin Adreon	
1957	Band of Angels	Charles de Marigny	Raoul Walsh	With Clark Gable and Sidney Portier
1958	From the Earth to the Moon	Josef Cartier	Byron Haskin	
1958	Auntie Mame	Lindsay Woolsey	Morton DaCosta	
1967	The Way West	Captain Grant	Andrew V. McLaglen	With Kirk Douglas and Robert Mitchum
1968	The Devil's Brigade	Adm. Lord Mountbatten	Andrew V. McLaglen	
1968	In Enemy Country	General Lloyd-Griffis	Harry Keller	
1970	Chisum	Henry Tunstall	Andrew V. McLaglen	With John Wayne
1972	The Man	South African Consul	Joseph Sargent	
1973	Terror in the Wax Museum	Mr. Southcott	Georg Fenady	
1973	Arnold	Douglas Whitehead	Georg Fenady	final film role
