= Khyber Patrol =

1954 film by Seymour Friedman

- Directed by: Seymour Friedman
- Written by: Jack De Witt
- Story by: Richard Schayer
- Produced by: Edward Small
- Starring: Richard Egan; Dawn Addams; Raymond Burr
- Cinematography: Charles Van Enger
- Edited by: Chester Schaeffer
- Music by: Irving Gertz
- Production company: World Films
- Distributed by: United Artists
- Release date: September 4, 1954
- Running time: 71 minutes
- Country: United States
- Language: English

Khyber Patrol is a 1954 American adventure film directed by Seymour Friedman and starring Richard Egan, Dawn Addams and Raymond Burr. The plot focuses on British troops on the Afghanistan border. It was distributed by United Artists as a second feature. The film is similar in theme to King of the Khyber Rifles starring Tyrone Power and Bengal Brigade starring Rock Hudson.

== Plot ==
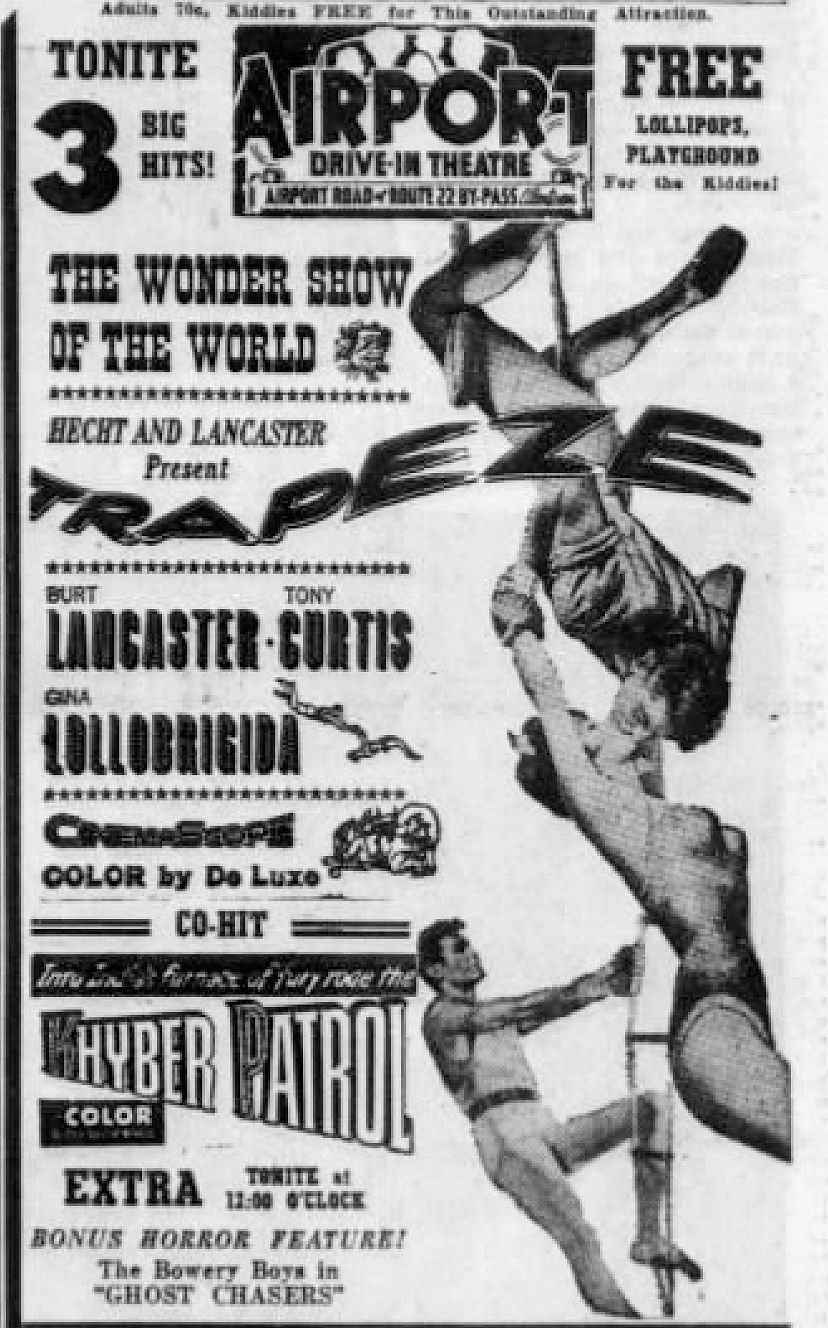
Newspaper advertisement with Khyber Patrol as second feature

Captain Kyle Cameron, a Canadian serving with the 11th Lancers at Peshawar on the North-West Frontier is reprimanded by his superiors for offending an Afghan leader Ishak Khan and forced to apologize. Cameron still suspects Khan of being in league with the Russians who are attempting to stir up trouble in the Khyber Pass region. Cameron is tricked into sending some men, including his rival for their general daughter Diana Melville, to their deaths. He deliberately gets himself dismissed from the service so that he can infiltrate the Khan's forces and seek revenge.

== Cast ==
- Richard Egan as Captain Kyle Cameron
- Dawn Addams as Diana Melville
- Patric Knowles as Lieutenant George Kennerly
- Raymond Burr as Captain Ahmed Shir
- Donald Randolph as Prince Ishak Khan
- Paul Cavanagh as Brigadier Melville
- Philip Tonge as Colonel Rivington
- Patrick O'Moore as Capt. Buzz Broussard
- Laura Mason as The Harem Girl
- Charlita as The Dancing Girl
- Gavin Muir as Major Bogle
- Robin Hughes as Tall Major in Lounge

== Bibliography ==
- Richards, Jeffrey. Visions of Yesterday. Routledge & Kegan Paul, 1973.
