= The Strange Case of Doctor Rx =

1942 film by William Nigh

- Directed by: William Nigh
- Written by: Clarence Upson Young
- Produced by: Jack Bernhard
- Starring: Patric Knowles; Lionel Atwill; Anne Gwynne; Ray "Crash" Corrigan; Samuel S. Hinds
- Cinematography: Elwood Bredell
- Distributed by: Universal Pictures
- Release date: April 17, 1942 (U.S.)
- Running time: 66 minutes
- Country: United States
- Language: English

The Strange Case of Doctor Rx is a 1942 black-and-white murder mystery/horror B film by Universal Studios directed by William Nigh and starring Patric Knowles, Lionel Atwill, Anne Gwynne, Ray "Crash" Corrigan and Samuel S. Hinds. Although Clarence Upson Young is credited with the screenplay, the actors mostly ad-libbed their lines. The plot involves the search for a serial killer who is targeting men who have been acquitted of murder. The film received poor reviews upon release.

== Plot ==
Private investigator Jerry Church has just married his longtime fiancée Kit. Defense attorney Dudley Crispin and Church's former police partner Capt. Hurd talk Church into accepting one last case. The case involves a string of murders committed by someone calling himself Dr. Rx, and the victims are five clients whom Crispin had successfully defended in court.

After a sixth murder and the discovery that another detective has gone insane investigating the murders, Church agrees to drop the case at Kit's insistence. However, he is kidnapped and blackmailed into continuing the investigation by a criminal whom the police suspect is the killer but who wants his name cleared when Church finds the real Dr. Rx.

Church is abducted by Dr. Rx, who wants to transplant Church's brain into a gorilla. Church is found the next morning and taken unconscious to the hospital. Crispin shoots himself with a poison dart gun and dies. Church reveals that he has been faking unconsciousness, that he had been working with Dr. Fish to capture Crispin and that Crispin wanted to prove himself brilliant by defending criminals in court and then reestablishing justice by killing the guilty men after their trials.

== Production ==
Shooting began on October 6, 1941, but as the script had not been completed, many of the scenes were ad-libbed. Anne Gwynne reported that making the film was "fun, fun, fun" but that the ad-libbing had left "some plot loopholes in the finished product."

The Strange Case of Doctor Rx was one of many films in which Ray Corrigan played a gorilla and wore a customized gorilla suit that he owned. Corrigan and Gwynne posed together for promotional stills, although they do not appear together in the film.

The picture was one of the 52 Universal films that Screen Gems released in 1956 for television distribution under the Shock! label.

== Reception ==
Variety called The Strange Case of Doctor Rx an "incredulous and wearisome tale" and wondered how it had been greenlighted by Universal. A New York Times review stated that the film was a "collection of babble clues, butlers at windows and gloomy manses, mysterious messages, stupid policemen, leers by Lionel Atwill and matrimonial badinage ... most of which is beside the point."

The Leonard Maltin Classic Movie Guide calls the film a "fast-paced whodunit" but "not particularly puzzling." In their book Universal Horrors: The Studio's Classic Films, 1931–1946, authors Tom Weaver, Michael Brunas and John Brunas appreciated the on-screen chemistry between Gwynne and Knowles, but wrote that Atwill was wasted "in the reddest of red herring roles" and that Shemp Howard's bumbling cop routine fell flat.

The film contains what some believe to be racial stereotyping in the film's treatment of Church's valet, played by comedian Mantan Moreland.
