= The Abductors =

1957 film by Andrew V. McLaglen

- Directed by: Andrew V. McLaglen (as Andrew McLaglen)
- Written by: Ray Wander
- Produced by: Ray Wander
- Starring: Victor McLaglen; George Macready; Gavin Muir
- Cinematography: Joseph LaShelle
- Edited by: Betty Steinberg
- Music by: Paul Glass
- Color process: Black and white
- Production company: Regal Films
- Distributed by: 20th Century Fox
- Release date: July 1957
- Running time: 80 minutes
- Country: United States
- Language: English
- Budget: under $120,000

The Abductors is a 1957 American film noir crime film directed by Andrew McLaglen and starring Victor McLaglen, George Macready and Gavin Muir. It was produced by Regal Films.

Maury Dexter described the film as "not too hot" but liked McLaglen's work enough to hire him as director on The Little Shepherd of Kingdom Come.

== Plot ==
Illinois, 1876: Tom Muldoon turns up in the capital city of Springfield, telling an old acquaintance, undertaker John Langley, that he has just gotten out of prison in Joliet. He shows Langley a new $50 bill created by a counterfeiter who had been his cellmate.

Muldoon proposes a scheme. The counterfeiter has hidden $100,000 in counterfeit currency, plus the engraving plates that can make more. But he is serving a life sentence, so Muldoon's idea is to kidnap the warden's daughter and trade her for the counterfeiter's release.

Langley agrees and persuades his partner Herbert Evans, mortuary employee Jed and niece Carol Ann to be accomplices. They find the warden's daughter working in a Chicago mission. Together they take the young woman hostage, but a carriage accident permits her to escape.

Desperately needing a new plan, Muldoon suggests becoming grave robbers, stealing the body Abraham Lincoln from its Springfield resting place. Evans, an admirer of Lincoln, objects and Muldoon murders him. Secret Service agent Fred Winters is tipped off that a crime is in progress. After the criminals discover Lincoln's tomb to be impenetrable, Muldoon is killed by a frightened horse. Langley gets 20 years in prison, also discovering that the counterfeiter's ruse was a lie.

== Cast ==
- Victor McLaglen as Tom Muldoon
- George Macready as Jack Langley
- Gavin Muir as Herbert Evans
- Fay Spain as The Girl
- Carl Thayler as The Boy
- John Morley as Officers of the Law
- Carlyle Mitchell as Officers of the Law
- George Cisar as Officers of the Law
- Jason Johnson as Officers of the Law
- Pat Lawless as Officers of the Law
- James Logan as Officers of the Law
- Fintan Meyler as Citizens of Springfield and Chicago
- Joseph Hamilton as Citizens of Springfield and Chicago (as Joe Hamilton)
- Nolan Leary as Citizens of Springfield and Chicago
- Gene Walker as Citizens of Springfield and Chicago
- Calvin Booth as Citizens of Springfield and Chicago
- Cliff Lyons as Citizens of Springfield and Chicago

== Production ==
The film was based on a US Secret Service paper called The Attempted Theft of President Lincoln's Body about a real life attempt to steal Lincoln's corpse that took place on 27 October 1876 in Oakridge Cemetery, Springfield Illinois. Writer-producer Ray Wander said he heard about the story while working with Mark Stevens on Washington on Big Time for TV. He secured permission to dig out evidence at the Library of Congress.

The film was announced in February 1957.

Andrew McLaglen said he "loved" directing his father. "I made the picture in ten days. He just did it as a favour for me." He would also direct his father in episodes of Rawhide and Have Gun Will Travel.
