= Four's a Crowd =

1938 film by Michael Curtiz

- Directed by: Michael Curtiz
- Written by: Wallace Sullivan (story)
- Screenplay by: Casey Robinson; Sig Herzig
- Produced by: Hal B. Wallis
- Starring: Errol Flynn; Olivia de Havilland; Rosalind Russell; Patric Knowles
- Cinematography: Ernest Haller
- Edited by: Clarence Kolster
- Music by: Eddie Durant; Ray Heindorf; M. K. Jerome; Heinz Eric Roemheld
- Production company: Warner Bros. Pictures
- Distributed by: Warner Bros. Pictures
- Release date: August 4, 1938 (U.S.)
- Running time: 92 minutes
- Country: United States
- Language: English
- Budget: $300,000

Four's a Crowd is a 1938 American screwball comedy film directed by Michael Curtiz, starring Errol Flynn, Olivia de Havilland, Rosalind Russell and Patric Knowles. The picture was written by Casey Robinson and Sig Herzig from a story by Wallace Sullivan. This was the fourth of nine films in which Errol Flynn and Olivia de Havilland appeared.

== Plot ==
Reporter Jean Christy works for a newspaper in danger of being thrown away by its young owner, Pat Buckley, after Buckley has a falling-out with the editor-in-chief, Robert Lansford. Meanwhile, Lansford hopes to gain tycoon John Dillingwell's business for his public relations firm, and uses his position at Buckley's paper to drum up good press for Dillingwell. In the process, he discovers that Dillingwell's granddaughter Lorri is Buckley's fiancée. Lansford decides to try to charm Lorri, while Christy makes a play for Buckley.

== Cast ==
- Errol Flynn as Robert Kensington "Bob" Lansford
- Olivia de Havilland as Lorri Dillingwell
- Rosalind Russell as Jean Christy
- Patric Knowles as Patterson "Pat" Buckley
- Walter Connolly as John P. Dillingwell
- Hugh Herbert as Silas Jenkins, Justice of the Peace
- Melville Cooper as Bingham, Dillingwell's butler
- Franklin Pangborn as Preston
- Herman Bing as Herman, a barber
- Margaret Hamilton as Amy, Dillingwell's housekeeper
- Joseph Crehan as Butler Pierce
- Joe Cunningham as Ed Young
- Gloria Blondell as Gertrude, Lansford's 1st secretary
- Carole Landis as Myrtle, Lansford's 2nd Secretary

== Production ==
The film began with the working title of "All Rights Reserved", and was supposedly based on the career of noted public relations man Ivy Ledbetter Lee, who worked for the Rockefeller family. The film's title was changed to Four's a Crowd in February.

David Lewis, who produced, said the original story was bought to him by an agent friend of his, Dick Polimer. Lewis liked the story, and took it to Hal Walls' assistant, Walter MacEwen, who was enthusiastic. Lewis said that Hal Wallis "had little faith in the film, maybe because of me, but Warner liked the project" in part because the author had written Libeled Lady.. Lewis said that Warner wanted to cast the Lane sisters and Jeffrey Lynn.

The first draft was written by staff writer Sig Herzig, a staff writer, who Lewis said "did a decent job, again without structure" so Lewis assigned the script to Casey Robinson.

Lewis said that Olivia de Havilland was keen to do it, as was Errol Flynn "as a change of pace". Patrick Knowles, also under contract to Warners, played the second male lead. Lewis wrote Knowles was "kept in reserve to keep the mercurial Errol in line... But Knowles was a pale image instead of a threat. Flynn was unique—attractive, dynamic, sexy, and a real throwback to the predatory male. I was enormously fond of him."

Warner Bros. borrowed Rosalind Russell from MGM for the film., replacing Bette Davis, who wished to take six weeks of a holiday before starting on Comet Over Broadway. "Four's A Crowd was a real “A” picture because of the casting," wrote Lewis.

William Dieterle, originally slated to direct the film, was also moved to Comet Over Broadway at the same time.

Edmund Goulding directly turned down directing it, before it was finally assigned to Michael Curtiz. Although principal photography went 12 days over the allotted time due to this switching in directors, Curtiz still managed to bring it in $12,000 under budget. Lewis wrote Curtiz " liked the script Casey and I had fashioned and thought the film was going to be a ball, which it was. I had always liked his work but came to respect him more when I worked with him. He was smart, fast, and on Four’s A Crowd there were none of the temper tantrums for which he was famous."

== Release ==
With the success of The Adventures of Robin Hood, Errol Flynn was concerned about being typecast as a swashbuckler, and convinced Warner Bros. to cast him in other types of films, specifically screwball comedies. However, Four's a Crowd was not a success at the box office, and encouraged Warner Bros. to keep Flynn in action roles.

Lewis wrote "I liked Four’s A Crowd. It wasn’t one of the really important things in my life, but it was a funny movie, a little deeper than most. The characters dictated the story and there was very little contrived in it once the premise was established."

== Notes ==
- Lewis, David (1993). Curtis, James (ed.). The Creative Producer. Metuchen: Scarecrow Press. ISBN 0-8108-2720-4.
