= The Honeymoon's Over (film) =

1939 film by Eugene Forde

- Theatrical release poster
- Directed by: Eugene Forde
- Screenplay by: Leonard Hoffman; Hamilton MacFadden; Clay Williams
- Based on: Six-Cylinder Love by William Anthony McGuire
- Produced by: Sol M. Wurtzel
- Starring: Stuart Erwin; Marjorie Weaver; Patric Knowles; Russell Hicks; Jack Carson; Hobart Cavanaugh
- Cinematography: Virgil Miller
- Edited by: Nick DeMaggio
- Music by: Samuel Kaylin
- Production company: 20th Century Fox
- Distributed by: 20th Century Fox
- Release date: December 14, 1939
- Running time: 69 minutes
- Country: United States
- Language: English

The Honeymoon's Over is a 1939 American comedy film directed by Eugene Forde and written by Leonard Hoffman, Hamilton MacFadden and Clay Williams. It is based on the 1921 play Six-Cylinder Love by William Anthony McGuire. The film stars Stuart Erwin, Marjorie Weaver, Patric Knowles, Russell Hicks, Jack Carson and Hobart Cavanaugh. The film was released on December 14, 1939, by 20th Century Fox.

== Cast ==
- Stuart Erwin as Donald Todd
- Marjorie Weaver as Betty Stewart Todd
- Patric Knowles as Pat Shields
- Russell Hicks as J.P. Walker
- Jack Carson as Tom Donroy
- Hobart Cavanaugh as Avery Butterfield
- June Gale as Peggy Ryder
- E. E. Clive as Col. Shelby
- Renie Riano as Annie
- Harrison Greene as Charlie Winslow
- Lelah Tyler as Mrs. Geraldine Winslow
- Harry Hayden as Roger Burton
- Nedda Harrigan as Mrs. Molly Burton
- Frank McGlynn Sr. as Thin Man
- Robert Greig as Horace Kellogg
