= Paul Maxey =

American actor (1907–1963)

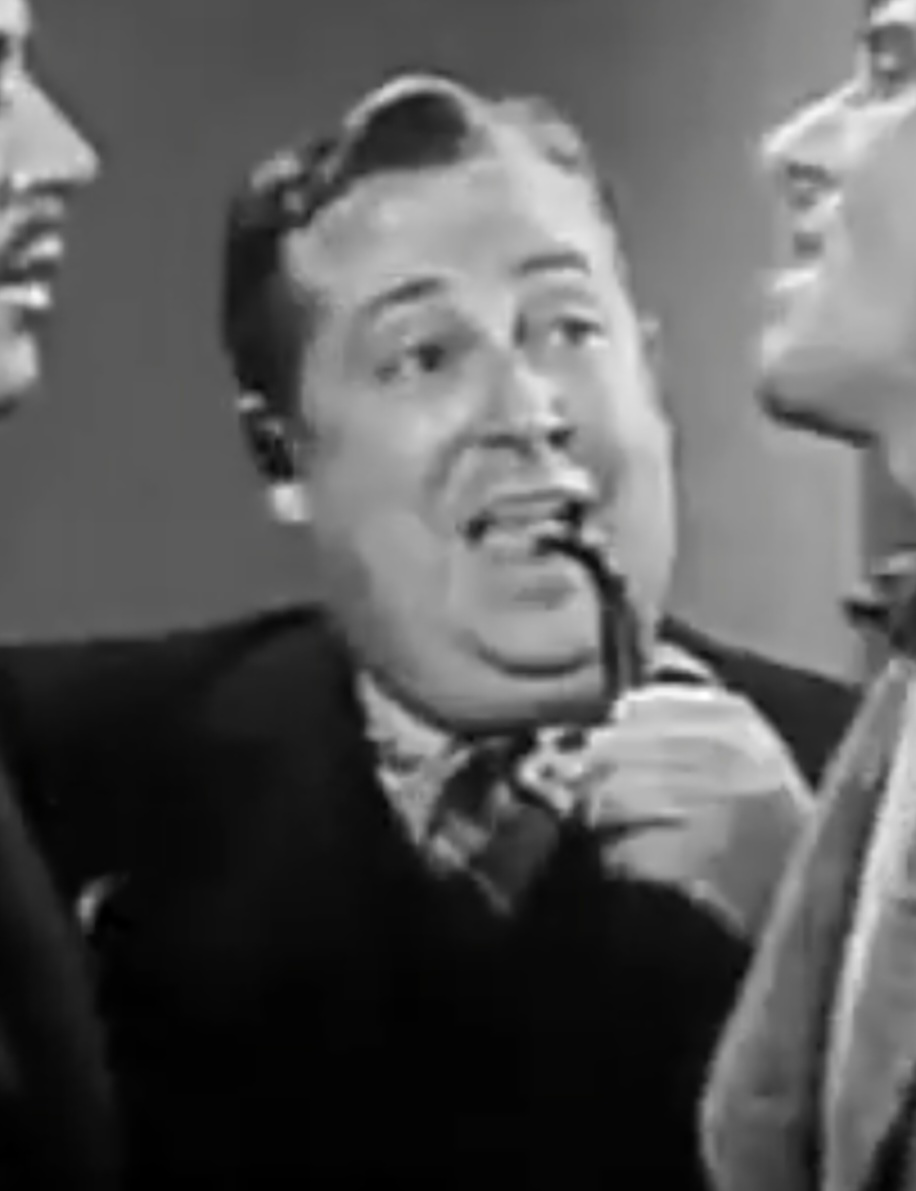
- Maxey in Let's Go Collegiate (1941)
- Born: Paul Regan Maxey; March 15, 1907; Wheaton, Illinois, U.S.
- Died: June 3, 1963 (aged 56); Pasadena, California, U.S.
- Resting place: Resurrection Cemetery, Montebello, California
- Occupation: Actor
- Years active: 1937–1963

Paul Regan Maxey (March 15, 1907 – June 3, 1963) was an American actor.

== Biography ==
Born in Wheaton, Illinois, the rotund Maxey played character roles in films from 1937, notably as the composer Victor Herbert in Till the Clouds Roll By (1946). He acted in many TV shows from the 1950s onwards, notably in the role of Mayor John Peoples in the sitcom The People's Choice (1955–1958) and such other shows as Willy, M Squad, Wagon Train, The Lone Ranger, Dennis the Menace, The Untouchables, Perry Mason and Lassie before his death in 1963 at age 56. He was buried in Resurrection Cemetery, Montebello, Los Angeles County, California.

== Selected filmography ==
- They Won't Forget (1937)
- Let's Go Collegiate (1941)
- I'll Sell My Life (1941)
- You're Out of Luck (1941)
- Till the Clouds Roll By (1946)
- Millie's Daughter (1947)
- Philo Vance's Secret Mission (1947)
- Abbott and Costello Meet the Invisible Man (1951)
- Singin' in the Rain (1952)
- The Narrow Margin (1952)
- Run for the Hills (1953)
- It's Always Fair Weather (1955)
- Showdown at Boot Hill (1958)
- 20,000 Eyes (1961)
