= Expensive Husbands =

1937 film

- Directed by: Bobby Connolly
- Screenplay by: Lillie Hayward; Jean Negulesco; Jay Brennan
- Story by: Kyrill DeShishmareff
- Produced by: Bryan Foy
- Starring: Patric Knowles; Beverly Roberts; Allyn Joslyn; Gordon Oliver; Vladimir Sokoloff; Eula Guy
- Cinematography: James Van Trees
- Edited by: Louis Hesse
- Music by: Jack Scholl; M. K. Jerome
- Production company: Warner Bros. Pictures
- Distributed by: Warner Bros. Pictures
- Release date: November 27, 1937
- Running time: 62 minutes
- Country: United States
- Language: English

Expensive Husbands is a 1937 American comedy film directed by Bobby Connolly and written by Lillie Hayward, Jean Negulesco and Jay Brennan. The film stars Patric Knowles, Beverly Roberts, Allyn Joslyn, Gordon Oliver, Vladimir Sokoloff and Eula Guy. The film was released by Warner Bros. Pictures on November 27, 1937.

== Plot ==
Actress Laurine Lynne, unable to get work in the United States, travels to Europe hoping to find employment. She makes a grand entrance at a Viennese hotel, and Rupert, one of the waiters, is immediately enchanted by her. He insists on serving her dinner, but angers her when he says that although he admires her a great deal, he can tell from her movie love scenes that she has never known a great love. Joe Craig, Laurine's press agent, arrives with the news that because a certain bad actress is married to a count, she has gotten the part that Laurine wanted. He suggests that Laurine marry a title to help her career, and taking his advice, Laurine advertises for a marriage of convenience. Without realizing that it is Laurine who is advertising, Rupert, who is really an impoverished prince, answers the ad. Both are surprised when they learn the identity of their potential mates, but proceed with the marriage. Although they love each other, both are convinced that the other went through with the marriage for selfish reasons: Laurine for the title, Rupert for the money. Nonetheless, when they are forced to spend their honeymoon night in a hotel that was Rupert's ancestral home, Laurine waits hopefully for her groom to come to bed. Rupert, however, is disgusted by Laurine's determination to return to Hollywood and her career and, in the middle of the night, leaves the hotel. The next morning, Joe calls with the news that Laurine has been signed to a picture. Her reviews are good, but now the press wants to meet the prince. During a press conference, where Laurine proclaims that she and her husband are madly in love, Rupert unexpectedly appears. He whispers that her love scenes have improved, but before he can explain his arrival, Laurine accuses him of returning for her money. Rupert decides to punish her by spending as much money as possible, although as he reveals to Joe, he is actually depositing an equal sum of money to her bank account. Rupert now has money of his own because he met the conditions of a will stipulating that he must earn a certain amount of money before he inherited a fortune. He announces that he is returning to Vienna and begs Laurine to give up her career and come with him. At first, she refuses, but some time later, she arrives at Rupert's home, which he has bought back, ready to be his wife.

== Cast ==
- Patric Knowles as Prince Rupert Heinrich Franz Von Rentzau
- Beverly Roberts as Laurine Lynne
- Allyn Joslyn as Joe Craig
- Gordon Oliver as Ricky Preston
- Vladimir Sokoloff as Herr Andrew Brenner
- Eula Guy as Trommy
- Robert Fischer as Joseph
- Fritz Feld as Herr Meyer
- Ann Codee as Maria
- George Humbert as Giovanni
- Otto Fries as Franz
