= Gavin Muir (American actor) =

American actor (1900–1972)

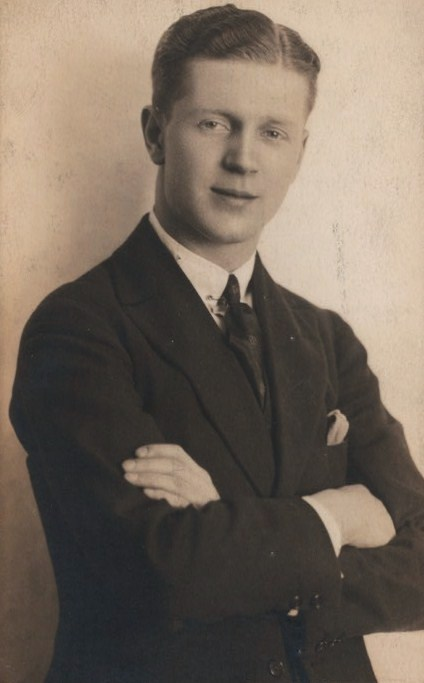
- Muir in 1925
- Born: September 8, 1900; Chicago, Illinois, U.S.
- Died: May 24, 1972 (aged 71); Fort Lauderdale, Florida, U.S.
- Occupation: Actor
- Years active: 1920–1965

Gavin Muir (September 8, 1900 – May 24, 1972) was an American film, television, and theatre actor.

== Biography ==
Muir's mother was American, and his father was Scottish. Although he was born in Chicago, he was educated in England at the University College School.

Muir's career included acting on Broadway through 1933. His first film appearance was in 1932 in a short film, then in John Ford's Mary of Scotland in 1936. His film career continued through 1965, often in character roles, and with a sort of specialty in villains with British accents.

== Broadway roles ==
- Enter Madame (1920) as John Fitzgerald
- Hay Fever (1927) with Laura Hope Crews and Frieda Inescort

== Partial filmography ==
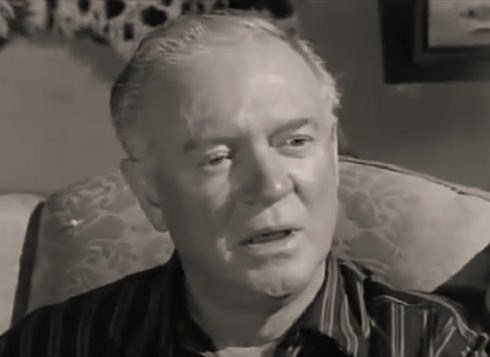
Muir in Night Tide (1961)

- Half Angel (1936) - Dr. William Barth
- Mary of Scotland (1936) - Leicester
- Charlie Chan at the Race Track (1936) - Bagley
- Lloyd's of London (1936) - Sir Gavin Gore
- The Holy Terror (1937) - Redman
- Fair Warning (1937) - Herbert Willett
- Wee Willie Winkie (1937) - Captain Bibberbeigh
- Tarzan Finds a Son! (1939) - Pilot (uncredited)
- One Night in Lisbon (1941) - Aide (uncredited)
- A Yank in the R.A.F. (1941) - Wing Commander (uncredited)
- Dangerously They Live (1941) - Captain Strong (credits) / Captain Hunter
- Captains of the Clouds (1942) - Orderly (uncredited)
- Eagle Squadron (1942) - Major Severn
- Sherlock Holmes and the Voice of Terror (1942) - BBC Radio Announcer (voice, uncredited)
- Nightmare (1942) - J.B. Abbington
- Hitler's Children (1943) - Nazi Major
- Sherlock Holmes in Washington (1943) - Bart Lang
- Passport to Suez (1943) - Karl
- Sherlock Holmes Faces Death (1943) - Phillip Musgrave
- Passport to Destiny (1944) - Herr Joyce / Lord Haw-Haw
- The Story of Dr. Wassell (1944) - Dutch Military Messenger (uncredited)
- The White Cliffs of Dover (1944) - Captain Griffiths (uncredited)
- The Merry Monahans (1944) - Weldon Laydon, Broadway Talent Scout
- The Master Race (1944) - Captain William Forsythe
- Tonight and Every Night (1945) - Group Captain G. Homesby (uncredited)
- Sherlock Holmes and the House of Fear (1945) - Chalmers
- Patrick the Great (1945) - Prentis Johns
- Salome Where She Danced (1945) - Henderson
- The Brighton Strangler (1945) - Captain Perry (uncredited)
- O.S.S. (1946) - Colonel Crawson
- Temptation (1946) - Smith-Parrington (uncredited)
- California (1947) - Booth Pennock
- Calcutta (1947) - Inspector Kendricks
- The Imperfect Lady (1947) - Kelvin (uncredited)
- Ivy (1947) - Sergeant (uncredited)
- Unconquered (1947) - Lieutenant Fergus McKenzie
- The Prince of Thieves (1948) - Baron Tristram (uncredited)
- Chicago Deadline (1949) - G.G. Temple
- Rogues of Sherwood Forest (1950) - Baron Alfred (uncredited)
- Abbott and Costello Meet the Invisible Man (1951) - Dr. Philip Gray
- Double Crossbones (1951) - British Sea Captain (uncredited)
- Thunder on the Hill (1951) - Melling
- The Son of Dr. Jekyll (1951) - Editor Richard Daniels
- Lady in the Iron Mask (1952)
- The Desert Rats (1953) - Captain (uncredited)
- The Royal African Rifles (1953)
- King of the Khyber Rifles (1953) - Major Lee, doctor (uncredited)
- Charge of the Lancers (1954) - Ring Official at Boxing Match (uncredited)
- King Richard and the Crusaders (1954) - Physician (uncredited)
- Khyber Patrol (1954) - Major Bogle (uncredited)
- Escape to Burma (1955) - Astrologer
- The Sea Chase (1955) - British Officer of the Watch (uncredited)
- Alfred Hitchcock Presents (1956) (Season 1 Episode 23: "Back for Christmas") as Mr. Wallingford
- D-Day the Sixth of June (1956) - Voice of Radio Broadcaster (uncredited)
- The Abductors (1957) - Herbert Evans
- Johnny Trouble (1957) - Madden
- Alfred Hitchcock Presents (1958) (Season 3 Episode 18: "Miss Bracegirdle Does Her Duty") as Dean Septimus Bracegirdle
- Alfred Hitchcock Presents (1958) (Season 3 Episode 37: "The Canary Sedan") as Thompson
- Too Much, Too Soon (1958) - Sean (uncredited)
- Island of Lost Women (1959) - Dr. McBain
- The Miracle (1959) - Colonel (uncredited)
- Night Tide (1961) - Captain Samuel Murdock
