= Showdown at Boot Hill =

1958 film by Gene Fowler Jr.

- Theatrical release poster
- Directed by: Gene Fowler Jr.
- Written by: Louis Vittes
- Produced by: Harold E. Knox
- Starring: Charles Bronson; Robert Hutton; John Carradine; Carole Mathews; Fintan Meyler; Paul Maxey
- Cinematography: John M. Nickolaus Jr.
- Edited by: Frank Sullivan
- Music by: Albert Harris
- Production company: Regal Films
- Distributed by: 20th Century Fox
- Release date: May 1, 1958
- Running time: 71 minutes
- Country: United States
- Language: English

Showdown at Boot Hill is a 1958 American Western film directed by Gene Fowler Jr., written by Louis Vittes, and starring Charles Bronson, Robert Hutton, John Carradine, Carole Mathews, Fintan Meyler and Paul Maxey. The film was released on May 1, 1958, by 20th Century Fox. It was the first film Gene Fowler Jr. made for Regal Films.

== Plot ==
US Marshal Luke Welsh rides into Mound City to serve a warrant and arrest Con Maynor with the plan of collecting the $200 bounty. Maynor decides to try and outdraw the Marshal but ends up losing. At the coroner's inquest the shooting is ruled as self-defense. When the Marshal asks for the judge to sign an affidavit to the facts the judge does but does not put the name of the deceased on the affidavit. Without the name on the paper the Marshal will not be able to collect the bounty. It turns out that Maynor was well liked by the community and no one will attest to the dead man being Maynor.

The Marshal keeps trying to get someone, anyone, to identify Maynor so he collects the bounty. During this time he learns more about why the town liked Maynor so much. He also has a growing attraction to Sally Crane, the local saloon owners daughter. He also meets Doc Weber who is the town's philosophical barber, and undertaker.

The Marshal's presence eats at the town and they begin to look for ways to get rid of him starting with egging a young, wannabe, gun slinger into drawing on him. The Marshal only wounds him. The town then gets a mob together to attack and kill him. Jill finds out and tells The Marshal and Sally to hide in her house. The gun slinger, delirious from being shot, finds the Marshal and in the ensuing struggle shoots Jill.

While this is going on Maynor's brother Charles comes to town for the funeral with his family. Unknown to the family Charles plans on killing the Marshal, his wife, seeing the Marshal with Sally, makes him rethink it.

The next day at the funeral Marshal presents himself, unarmed, to Charles as the man who shot his brother. Charles attacks him but is stopped by the funeral attendees. The Marshal and Doc discuss everything and the Marshal decides that he and Sally belong together and leaves to be with her.

== Review ==
An unusual western plot that is character driven and reaches beyond right/wrong morality, requiring its male and female leads to develop and act on introspection. Bronson portrays a Marshal who has turned bounty hunter explicitly as a reaction to his being "short" and unable to command the allegiance of those he is to protect. His beliefs and lifestyle are challenged by Doc played by John Carradine who sees something of his younger self in this angry man with a gun. Also driving the psychological elements of the film is the Marshal's growing attachment to Jill (Carole Mathews) and her daughter Sally (Fintan Meyler).

== Cast ==
- Charles Bronson as Luke Welsh
- Robert Hutton as Sloane
- John Carradine as Doc Weber
- Carole Mathews as Jill Crane
- Fintan Meyler as Sally Crane
- Paul Maxey as Judge Wallen
- Thomas Browne Henry as Con Maynor
- William Stevens as Corky
- Martin Smith as Tex
- Joe McGuinn as Mr. Creavy
- George Douglas as Charles Maynor
- Mike Mason as Les Patton
- George Pembroke as Sheriff Hinkle
- Argentina Brunetti as Mrs. Bonaventura
- Ed Wright as Brent
- Stacey Marshall as Saloon Girl
- Shirley Haven as Customer

== Production ==
The film was shot in late 1957, and gave an early lead role to Charles Bronson.

The film was the first in a series that Gene Fowler Jr. made for Robert L. Lippert. Fowler said "that Lippert experience was wonderful in a way because we had the run of the Fox lot; whatever sets happened to be still standing, we'd use those sets. My partner, Lou Vittes and I, would walk through those sets that had already been used for more expensive pictures than we could make and we would pretty much write the script around those sets."

Parts of the theme song sound similar to the theme from The Man Who Shot Liberty Valance, directed by John Ford four years later and starring John Wayne, James Stewart and Lee Marvin.
