= Cinerama Releasing Corporation =

Motion picture company established in 1967

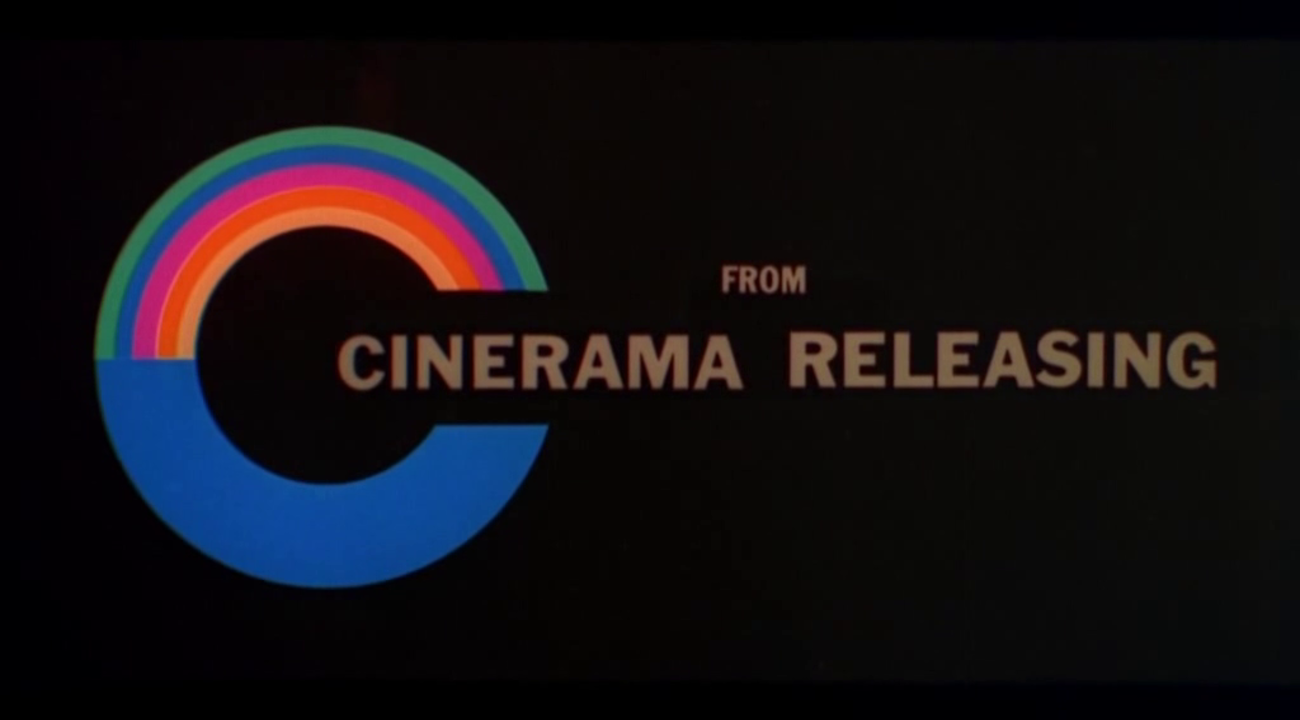
- Type: Corporation
- Industry: Filmed entertainment
- Founded: 1966; 60 years ago
- Defunct: 1975; 51 years ago
- Services: Theatrical films distribution
- Parent: Cinerama

Cinerama Releasing Corporation (CRC) was a motion picture company established in 1967 that originally released films produced by its namesake parent company that was considered an "instant major". (Note: Page 10.)

== History ==
In 1963, the owner of the Pacific Coast Theater chain, William R. Foreman, purchased Cinerama, Inc. In 1966, CRC was set up to be an independent distributor of widescreen motion pictures produced by Cinerama, various foreign films and ABC Pictures, the film production unit of the American Broadcasting Company. (Note: Orders of Magnitude. Page 332-333.) CRC was only a distributor of films, without retaining copyright stake over each production. As an instant major by 1970, CRC reached a 10% market share. ABC Pictures ended operations in early 1973, thus CRC moved to primarily distributing non-financed films (acquisitions). By August 1974, CRC had released 125 acquired films at which time its productions and reissues were handled by American International Pictures. Cinerama, Inc., CRC's parent company, was liquidated in May 1978 with the Cinerama name ending up being owned by Pacific Coast Theater.

== Films released ==
Release date	Title	Production company(ies)	Format
November 9, 1967	Custer of the West	Cinerama Productions Corp. presents, Security Pictures	Super Technirama 70
May 1, 1968	A Minute to Pray, a Second to Die	Selmur Pictures	Panavision
July 17, 1968	For Love of Ivy	ABC Pictures International	
September 23, 1968	Charly	ABC Pictures International	
September 25, 1968	Nobody Runs Forever (The High Commissioner)	Rank Organisation, Rodlor, Inc., Selmur Pictures	
October 7, 1968	Shalako	Palomar Pictures International, Kingston Film Productions, Ltd., CCC	
December 12, 1968	The Killing of Sister George	ABC Pictures International	
December 17, 1968	Candy	ABC Pictures International	
December 18, 1968	Hell in the Pacific	Selmur Pictures	Panavision
April 25, 1969	Follow Me		
May 14, 1969	Krakatoa, East of Java	Cinerama Releasing Corporation	Super Panavision 70
June 27, 1969	Ring of Bright Water	Palomar Pictures International, The Rank Organisation	
July 5, 1969	Midas Run	ABC Pictures International	
July 7, 1969	How to Commit Marriage	Naho Productions	
August 18, 1969	Take the Money and Run	ABC Pictures, Palomar Pictures Corporation	
August 20, 1969	What Ever Happened to Aunt Alice?	Palomar Pictures Corporation, The Associates & Aldrich Company	
October 8, 1969	Change of Mind	Cinerama Productions Corp., Sagittarius Productions	
December 10, 1969	They Shoot Horses, Don't They?	ABC Pictures International	
January 2, 1970	Jenny	ABC Pictures International	
February 4, 1970	The Honeymoon Killers	Roxanne	
February 12, 1970	Mumsy, Nanny, Sonny and Girly	Brigitte, Fitzroy Films Ltd., Ronald J. Kahn Productions	
March 1970	The Last Grenade	Lockmore	
May 20, 1970	Too Late the Hero	ABC Pictures International	
August 12, 1970	Lovers and Other Strangers	ABC Pictures International	
September 11, 1970	Suppose They Gave a War and Nobody Came	ABC Pictures International	
October 1, 1970	How Do I Love Thee?	ABC Pictures International	
November 4, 1970	Song of Norway	ABC Pictures International	
January 24, 1971	Zachariah	ABC Pictures International	
January 28, 1971	The Last Valley	Season Productions, ABC Pictures International	
April 2, 1971	The House That Dripped Blood	Amicus Productions	
May 26, 1971	When Eight Bells Toll	Gershwin-Kastner Productions, Winkast Film Productions	
May 29, 1971	The Grissom Gang	ABC Pictures International, The Associates & Aldrich Company	
June 18, 1971	Willard	Bing Crosby Productions	
June 29, 1971	My Old Man's Place	Philip A. Waxman Productions Inc.	
August 30, 1971	The Touch	ABC Pictures International	
September 17, 1971	Kotch	ABC Pictures International	
September 27, 1971	The Trojan Women	Josef Shaftel Productions Inc.	
October 1, 1971	The Statue	Josef Shaftel Productions Inc.	
November 3, 1971	Straw Dogs	ABC Pictures International	
December 19, 1971	Le Boucher	Les Films de la Boétie, Euro International Film (EIA)	
February 22, 1972	Payday	Fantasy Films, Fantasy Records, Pumice Finance Company	
March 27, 1972	Irish Whiskey Rebellion		
March 8, 1972	Tales from the Crypt	Amicus Entertainment, Metromedia Producers Corporation	
March 10, 1972	Georgia, Georgia	Diotima Films and Jorkel Productions Inc.	Super 16 mm, blown up to 35mm film
April 1972	Compañeros	Tritone Filmindustria, Atlantida Film, Terra-Filmkunst	
May 12, 1972	Hammersmith Is Out	J. Cornelius Crean Films Inc.	
June 23, 1972	Ben	Bing Crosby Productions	
June 28, 1972	The Happiness Cage	International Film Ventures, Laterna Film	
August 2, 1972	Junior Bonner		
September 1, 1972	Bluebeard	Gloria Film, Barnabé Productions, Geiselgasteig Film	
September 22, 1972	Necromancy	Compass/Zenith International	
November 9, 1972	Black Girl		
November 17, 1972	Asylum	Amicus Productions	
February 22, 1973	Walking Tall	Bing Crosby Productions	
March 30, 1973	The Vault of Horror	Amicus Entertainment, Metromedia Producers Corporation	
April 4, 1973	The Mack	CRC & Harvey Bernhard Enterprises	
April 27, 1973	And Now the Screaming Starts!	Amicus Productions	
May 1973	Terror in the Wax Museum	Andrew J. Fenady Productions, Bing Crosby Productions	
May 11, 1973	The Harrad Experiment		
August 1973	Your Three Minutes Are Up	Permut Presentations, Minutes Company	
August 3, 1973	A Name for Evil	Penthouse	
October 1973	Doctor Death: Seeker of Souls	Freedom Arts Pictures Corporation	
October 1973	The Pyx	Host Productions Quebec	
November 16, 1973	Arnold	Fenady Associates, Bing Crosby Productions	
December 1973	Marco	Tomorrow Entertainment, Rankin/Bass Animated Entertainment	
1974	Seizure		
January 1974	How to Seduce a Woman	Forward	
March 1974	Street Gangs of Hong Kong	Shaw Brothers Studio	
March 22, 1974	Catch My Soul	Metromedia Productions	
April 1974	The Beast Must Die	Amicus Productions, British Lion Film Corporation	
May 1974	Dark Places	Glenbeigh, Sedgled	
June 1974	The Mysterious Island of Captain Nemo	Albina Productions S.a.r.l., Cameroons Development, Cité Films	
June 27, 1974	W	Bing Crosby Productions	
August 1974	Harrad Summer	Cinema Arts Productions, Inc.	
November 22, 1974	Sunday in the Country	American International Pictures, EMI Films, Canadian Film Development Corporation	
April 25, 1975	The Reincarnation of Peter Proud	Bing Crosby Productions, American International Pictures	

== See also ==
- Major film studios
- National General Pictures, another instant major
- Commonwealth United, a sometimes instant major
