= Ben Wright (English actor) =

British actor (1915–1989)

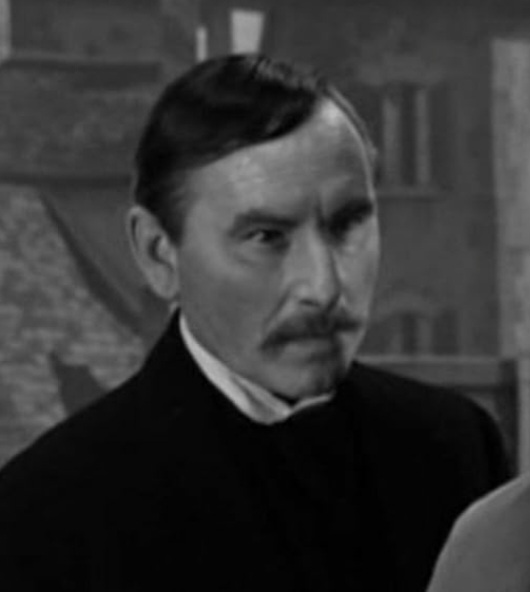
- Wright in an episode of One Step Beyond (1959)
- Born: Benjamin Huntington Wright; 5 May 1915; London, England
- Died: 2 July 1989 (aged 74); Burbank, California, U.S.
- Occupation: Actor
- Years active: 1936–1989
- Spouse(s): Joan Kemp-Welch (m. 1936; div. 1950) Muriel Louise Roberts (m. 1951)
- Children: 2

Benjamin Huntington Wright (5 May 1915 – 2 July 1989) was an English actor. He was best known for playing Herr Zeller in The Sound of Music. He also played numerous roles in famous films and worked as voice actor, having roles in animated films by Disney Studios such as One Hundred and One Dalmatians, The Jungle Book and The Little Mermaid.

== Early life ==
Ben Wright was born on 5 May 1915 in London to an American father and an English mother. At the age of 16, he entered the Royal Academy of Dramatic Art. Upon graduating, he acted in several West End stage productions. When World War II broke out, he enlisted and served in the King's Royal Rifle Corps. He came to the U.S. in 1946 to attend a cousin's wedding and settled in Hollywood.

== Radio ==
Wright worked as the radio incarnation of Sherlock Holmes (1949–1950) and Inspector Peter Black on Pursuit (1951–1952). He played Indian servant Tulku on The Green Lama, Chinese bellhop Hey Boy on the radio version of Have Gun Will Travel, various dialect roles on Night Beat, and the anthology series, Escape, on which his roles ranged from the Cockney protagonist of The Man Who Worked Miracles to the famed Arabian hero of The Voyages of Sinbad. His other radio credits included Gunsmoke, Crime Classics, and Suspense.

== Film and television ==
He achieved worldwide attention when he was seen as the Nazi Herr Zeller in The Sound of Music (1965), and he had small roles in Judgment at Nuremberg (1961), My Fair Lady (1964), and Billy Wilder's The Fortune Cookie (1966). On television, he was a guest star on such series as My Three Sons, Hogan's Heroes (as various Nazi officers), McHale's Navy, Combat!, Get Smart, Bonanza, Gunsmoke (in a recurring role as billiard parlor owner “Dan Binney”, later as town barber “Birger Engdohl”, as Sgt. Pickens in “Wagon Girls”, as priest “Father Tom” in “Friend”, as storekeeper “Mr. Ross” in “Father’s Love” and finally as a dishonest land claim agent in “Two of a Kind” (S8E27), The Wild Wild West, The Twilight Zone, Have Gun, Will Travel as Jackson (S2E27), Mr. Adams and Eve, The Tab Hunter Show, Straightaway, Voyage to the Bottom of the Sea, It Takes a Thief, Mission: Impossible, as Mr. Rudolpho on the final episode of the 1964 series The Addams Family, and The Rockford Files. Wright made three guest appearances on Perry Mason, starring Raymond Burr. He played Walter Lumis in the 1958 episode "The Case of the Terrified Typist", in the 1960 episode, "The Case of the Bashful Burro", he played assay agent and murderer Crawford Wright, who speaks with a Welsh-sounding accent and he played Clarence Keller in the 1961 episode "The Case of the Guilty Clients".

Wright played Governor José María de Echeandía in the 1960 episode "Forbidden Wedding" of the syndicated anthology series Death Valley Days, hosted by Stanley Andrews.

Wright made a guest appearance on the television series The Monkees, in the episode "The Success Story". He had appearances on Alfred Hitchcock Presents and Dragnet 1967. In 1971 Wright appeared as the desk clerk on "The Men From Shiloh" (rebranded name of the TV western The Virginian) in the episode titled "The Town Killer." Ben Wright also appeared in the first season of Barnaby Jones; episode titled, "Twenty Million Alibis" (6 May 1973).

Wright also worked as a voice actor. He was often heard on The Outer Limits as various alien voices, and he also appeared on camera. Other voice work included the narrator in Cleopatra (1963) with Elizabeth Taylor, the BBC announcer in the film version of The Diary of Anne Frank (1959) and featured animation roles in several Disney films: One Hundred and One Dalmatians (1961) as songwriter Roger Radcliffe, The Jungle Book (1967) as Mowgli's wolf father, Rama, and The Little Mermaid (1989) as Grimsby, which was his final role.

== Death ==
On 2 July 1989, at the age of 74, Wright died in Saint Joseph Medical Center in Burbank, California, after undergoing heart surgery.

== Selected filmography ==
- Well Done, Henry (1936) – Himself (uncredited)
- The Avenging Hand (1936) – Lift Boy (uncredited)
- Sahara (1943) – (uncredited)
- The Exile (1947) – Milbanke
- Kiss the Blood Off My Hands (1948) – Cockney Tout (uncredited)
- The Fighting O'Flynn (1949) – Lieutenant (uncredited)
- Sword in the Desert (1949) – Radio Man (uncredited)
- Botany Bay (1952) – Deck Officer Green
- The Desert Rats (1953) – Mick
- Man in the Attic (1953) – Detective in Theatre Box (uncredited)
- Hell and High Water (1954) – BBC Announcer (uncredited)
- Prince Valiant (1954) – Seneschal (uncredited)
- Prince of Players (1955) – Horatio in 'Hamlet' (uncredited)
- The Racers (1955) – Dr. Seger (uncredited)
- A Man Called Peter (1955) – Mr. Findlay (uncredited)
- Jump Into Hell (1955) – Captain Pluen (uncredited)
- Moonfleet (1955) – Officer (uncredited)
- Desert Sands (1955) – Commandant Captain (uncredited)
- 23 Paces to Baker Street (1956) – Simmons – Hotel Porter (uncredited)
- D-Day the Sixth of June (1956) – General Millensbeck (uncredited)
- Johnny Concho (1956) – Benson
- The Power and the Prize (1956) – Mr. Chutwell
- Pharaoh's Curse (1957) – Walter Andrews
- Until They Sail (1957) – Defense Attorney (uncredited)
- Kiss Them for Me (1957) – Peters, RAF Pilot (uncredited)
- Witness for the Prosecution (1957) – Barrister Reading Charges (uncredited)
- Villa!! (1958) – Francisco Madero
- These Thousand Hills (1959) – Frenchy (uncredited)
- The Wreck of the Mary Deare (1959) – Mike
- Journey to the Center of the Earth (1959) – Paisley (uncredited)
- The Lost World (1960) – BBC Field Reporter Ted Bottomley (uncredited)
- One Hundred and One Dalmatians (1961) – Roger Radcliffe (voice)
- Operation Bottleneck (1961) – Manders the Englishman
- Judgment at Nuremberg (1961) – Herr Halbestadt, Haywood's butler
- Mutiny on the Bounty (1962) – Graves (uncredited)
- Cleopatra (1963) – Narrator (voice, uncredited)
- A Gathering of Eagles (1963) – Leighton. S.A.C. Observer
- The Prize (1963) – British Reporter (uncredited)
- The Alfred Hitchcock Hour (1963) (Season 2 Episode 1: "A Home Away from Home") - Dr. Jerry Norton
- The Alfred Hitchcock Hour (1964) (Season 2 Episode 19: "Murder Case") - Tony Niles
- My Fair Lady (1964) – Footman at Ball (uncredited)
- The Alfred Hitchcock Hour (1965) (Season 3 Episode 22: "Thou Still Unravished Bride") - Mr. Sutherland
- The Sound of Music (1965) – Herr Zeller
- My Blood Runs Cold (1965) – Lansbury
- Munster Go Home (1966) – Hennesy
- The Fortune Cookie (1966) – Specialist #4
- The Sand Pebbles (1966) – Englishman (uncredited)
- The Jungle Book (1967) – Rama, the Wolf (voice)
- The Rat Patrol - Season 2 - Episode 13 (1967) - Colonel Jameson
- Topaz (1969) – French Officer (uncredited)
- Raid on Rommel (1971) – Admiral
- The Virginian (TV series) (1971) – Desk Clerk, Season 9 episode 22 (The Town Killer)
- Chandar, the Black Leopard of Ceylon (1972) – Narrator
- Terror in the Wax Museum (1973) – First Constable
- Arnold (1973) – Jonesy
- The Little Mermaid (1989) – Grimsby (voice) (final film role, released posthumously)
