= The Brown Wallet =

1936 British film by Michael Powell

- trade poster
- Directed by: Michael Powell
- Written by: Ian Dalrymple
- Based on: short story by Stacy Aumonier
- Produced by: Irving Asher
- Starring: Patric Knowles
- Cinematography: Basil Emmott
- Production company: Warner Brothers-First National Productions
- Distributed by: Warner Bros.
- Release date: 20 July 1936
- Running time: 68 minutes
- Country: United Kingdom
- Language: English

The Brown Wallet is a lost 1936 British crime film, directed by Michael Powell and starring Patric Knowles. It was written by Ian Dalrymple, adapted from a short story by Stacy Aumonier.

== Preservation status ==
The British Film Institute has classed The Brown Wallet as a lost film. Its National Archive holds a collection of ephemera and stills but no film or video materials. It is among eleven of over twenty quota quickies directed by Powell between 1931 and 1936 of which there is no extant print.

== Plot ==
Publisher John Gillespie faces a financial crisis after his business partner skips town with all the firm's assets. Facing ruin, he reluctantly approaches a wealthy aunt for assistance but is met with a stony-faced refusal. Returning home in a taxi, he finds a wallet containing £2,000 left behind by a previous passenger. He takes the wallet, but rather than confiding in his wife he rents a room in which he secretes the money, telling her he needs the room for business purposes.

Shortly afterwards his aunt is found murdered, with her safe having been broken into and robbed. Gillespie is the prime suspect, and wary of incriminating himself with regard to the £2,000 and unwilling to face having to surrender the cash, his story is deemed unsatisfactory and he is arrested and charged with murder. However, a former employee of his aunt makes his own investigation into the case and discovers the real culprit. Gillespie is released, then discovers he has been bequeathed a large sum of money in his aunt's will. He can then return the wallet and the £2,000 to its rightful owner.

== Cast ==
- Patric Knowles as John Gillespie
- Nancy O'Neil as Eleanor
- Henry Caine as Simmonds
- Henrietta Watson as Aunt Mary
- Charlotte Leigh as Miss Barton
- Shayle Gardner as Wotherspoone
- Edward Dalby as Minting
- Eliot Makeham as Hobday
- Bruce Winston as Julian Thorpe
- Jane Millican as Miss Bloxham

== Reception ==
The Monthly Film Bulletin wrote: "The characterisation is unconvincing throughout the film, and each part is overdrawn in an attempt to simulate reality. This is especially noticeable in the smaller parts. ... The cast works hard to portray the series of types which they are called on to represent, but there is a lack of directness about the production which prevents the full development of the tension which should be an integral part of a 'murder' film."

Kine Weekly wrote: "A human but not altogether satisfactory story ... Patric Knowles has a likeable personality, though his performance as the young Oxford man under shadow of debt and suspicion is wanting in light and shade. ... Michael Powell dwells too long on the opening sequences, and in spite of good detail and neatly handled situations one cannot get over the impression that the hero does not behave altogether intelligently. Plot complications add to the interest about half-way, and work up to a more or less dramatic inquest, culminating in the discovery of the least likely person as the murderer. Dialogue flows rather too freely, but there are some good wisecracks."

The Daily Film Renter wrote: "Patric Knowles gives an ingratiating performance as the worried Gillespie, admirably suggesting the mental turmoil of a man caught up in a web of lies and deceit, while Nancy O'Neil is on hand to dispense much-needed sympathy as his adoring wife. Henrietta Watson's stern, unbending Aunt Mary is well played, and Eliot Makeham scores with a deftly observed study of a publisher's agent."

Picturegoer wrote: "The opening is unduly prolonged and there is a surplus of dialogue but one or two situations are neatly handled and some detail work is effective. Patric Knowles is fair as the publisher and Nancy O'Neil effective as his wife. Actually the acting honours go to the minor characterisations."

Picture Show wrote: "Patric Knowles gives an excellent performance. Fair entertainment."
