= No Man's Woman (1955 film) =

1955 film by Franklin Adreon

- Directed by: Franklin Adreon
- Written by: Don Martin; John K. Butler
- Produced by: Rudy Ralston
- Starring: Marie Windsor; John Archer; Patric Knowles
- Cinematography: Bud Thackery
- Edited by: Howard A. Smith
- Music by: R. Dale Butts
- Production company: Republic Pictures
- Distributed by: Republic Pictures
- Release date: October 27, 1955
- Running time: 70 minutes
- Country: United States
- Language: English

No Man's Woman is a 1955 American film noir crime film directed by Franklin Adreon and starring Marie Windsor, John Archer and Patric Knowles. The film's sets were designed by the art director Walter E. Keller.

== Plot ==
Marie Windsor stars as Carolyn Ellenson Grant, a nasty and independent lady. Her husband asks to divorce her when he falls in love with another woman, he had previously refused to divorce her when she asked years ago. Now they live completely separate lives while he supports her financially, so she refuses to divorce this time. She also has a lover who she uses ruthlessly to get what she wants and along the way she decides to destroy a few lives for kicks. Eventually, she is killed and the police think the husband did it...not realizing practically EVERYONE had motives to do it! Can the husband manage to prove his innocence?

== Cast ==
- Marie Windsor as Carolyn Ellenson Grant
- John Archer as Harlow Grant
- Patric Knowles as Wayne Vincent
- Nancy Gates as Louise Nelson
- Jil Jarmyn as Betty Allen
- Richard Crane as Dick Sawyer
- Fern Hall as Virginia Gillis
- Louis Jean Heydt as Det. Lt. Colton
- John Gallaudet as Det. Sgt. Wells
- Douglas Wood as Philip Grant
- Percy Helton as Otto Peterson
- Morris Ankrum as Capt. Hostedder
- Paul Bryar as Sandy
- Morris Buchanan as Attendant
- Ted Cooper as Photographer
- Franklyn Farnum as Police Criminologist
- Will J. White as Policeman

== See also ==
- List of American films of 1955

== Bibliography ==
- Spicer, Andrew. Historical Dictionary of Film Noir. Scarecrow Press, 2010.
