= Passport to Destiny =

1944 film by Ray McCarey

- Original film lobby card
- Directed by: Ray McCarey
- Written by: Muriel Roy Bolton; Val Burton
- Produced by: Herman Schlom
- Starring: Elsa Lanchester; Gordon Oliver; Lenore Aubert
- Cinematography: Jack MacKenzie
- Edited by: Robert Swink
- Music by: Roy Webb
- Production company: RKO Radio Pictures, Inc.
- Distributed by: RKO Radio Pictures
- Release date: February 25, 1944 (U.S.)
- Running time: 65 minutes
- Country: United States
- Language: English

Passport to Destiny is a 1944 RKO Radio Pictures war film, starring Elsa Lanchester as an English charwoman who, believing herself invulnerable by being protected by a magic eye amulet, travels to Nazi Germany to personally assassinate Adolf Hitler.

== Plot ==
Ella Muggins is a Camberwell charwoman who is the widow of a regimental sergeant major. (Note: Mr. Muggins' photograph is actually that of Charles Laughton, Lanchester's real-life husband.) One day during the London Blitz, she relates to her friends a story about a "magic eye" charm that her husband obtained during his Army service in India that protected him from all harm. Whilst cleaning her attic, she goes through her husband's effects and finds the charm that she absent-mindedly puts in the pocket of her skirt.

During an air raid, she is caught in the middle of the street with a delay-action bomb. One air raid warden tells her to run, another to lie down. She does the latter and survives the explosion, and is helped to the shelter in a daze. As she recovers, she is convinced that her husband's "Magic Eye" charm has protected her. She asks a friend what she would do if she were totally invulnerable. Looking up to the street being bombed, her friend replies that she would go to Germany and "give that Mr. Hitler what for". Ella leaves the shelter, unconcerned about the bombs exploding around her, as she sets out to do just that.

Stowing away on a British merchant ship, Ella is discovered by the crew, who think having a woman aboard is bad luck; subsequently, a German bomber sinks the ship. Ella reaches France in a lifeboat, and hides as all the other survivors are quickly captured by the Germans. Ella works her way across France and Germany, pretending to be a deaf-mute cleaning woman. She shares a train compartment with German Captain Franz Von Weber. Frederick Walthers arrives, and she is asked to leave the compartment but listens from outside. Both men are members of the anti-Hitler German resistance. Walthers informs Franz that Grete, Franz's fiancée and Walthers' niece, has been arrested. Franz is determined to rescue her.

Ella gets herself hired as a cleaner in the Reich Chancellery when she convinces Lieutenant Bosch that she is deaf and dumb. Luckily for her, she sees Bosch's reflection when her back is turned to him and shows no reaction when he shoots his pistol to test her. She is working in Sturmfuehrer Dietrich's office when a British traitor, Herr Joyce or "Lord Haw" (based on William Joyce, "Lord Haw-Haw"), comes to complain about his treatment. (Note: The character of Herr Joyce is referred to as "Lord Haw" in reference to Lord Haw-Haw.) Dietrich is unconcerned, as Joyce's usefulness is rapidly diminishing. On his way out, Joyce slips on a bar of soap Ella has purposely placed. Ella also overhears that Grete is being held in Moabit Prison.

When Franz tries to see Dietrich, Ella writes the message "Grete Mobit" on the floor. Noticing Ella's brush says "Champion: Made in England", Franz later hears the supposedly deaf and dumb woman singing in English, and realizes Ella is not who she seems. Outside, she lends him her Magic Eye to rescue Grete. Franz is able to have Greta released, but it is actually a ploy by Dietrich; he has the couple followed in hopes they will lead him to other members of the German Resistance.

Inside Hitler's private office, Ella rehearses what she will say to him, but Dietrich is eavesdropping on the intercom. Lord Haw enters and begs Ella to help him escape from Germany. Both are arrested, as are Frederick, Franz and Grete. After Dietrich gives Ella back the eye, the Royal Air Force bombs the Chancellery. (Note: Although the characters refer to an RAF raid, the footage shows USAAF B-17 bombers.) Frederick is killed, but Ella, Franz and Grete take advantage of the confusion to escape to an airfield, where Franz steals a bomber. They fly to England and land by parachute. (Note: The escape was intended to emulate the escape of Rudolf Hess.)

Feted as a heroine, Ella shows a reporter her husband's chest where she found the amulet, but discovers many more in a box labeled as souvenirs of a glass blowers' exhibition.

== Cast ==
- Elsa Lanchester as Ella Muggins
- Gordon Oliver as Capt. Franz von Weber
- Lenore Aubert as Grete Neumann
- Lionel Royce as Sturmfuehrer Karl Dietrich
- Fritz Feld as Chief Janitor
- Joseph Vitale as Lt. Bosch
- Gavin Muir as Herr Joyce / Lord Haw
- Lloyd Corrigan as Prof. Frederick Walthers
- Anita Sharp-Bolster as Agnes (as Anita Bolster)
- Lydia Bilbrook as Millie
- Lumsden Hare as Freighter Captain Mack
- Hans Schumm as Miniger, Dietrich's Aide

== Production ==
In August 1943, no less than six Hollywood films about Adolf Hitler or with Hitler in the title (e.g. Hitler's Children, Hitler – Dead or Alive, The Strange Death of Adolf Hitler, The Hitler Gang) were in production. Principal photography took place from late August to mid-September 1943. Originally filmed as Dangerous Journey, the title was changed to Passport to Adventure, perhaps due to the similarity to Warner's Desperate Journey, then to Passport to Destiny. The production was rushed through "before some soldier beats Elsa to Hitler".

Two actors were "borrowed" from other studios: Gordon Oliver came from David O. Selznick Productions and Lenore Aubert from Samuel Goldwyn's company to appear in the film. Ray McCarey, the brother of Leo McCarey, was signed on a contract to Republic Pictures after the film.

For the climactic escape scene, the studio again used the Capelis XC-12 transport that was on the backlot, this time painted to resemble a Luftwaffe bomber. (Note: Footage of a Dornier Do 17 and a B-25 bomber is merged into the escape scene.)

== Reception ==
Passport to Destiny was intended to be a comedy but, despite the best efforts of its star, the contrived scenario of a Hitler assassination was described as doomed by a "screenplay (that) was quintessential tommyrot, undiluted by even the smallest amount of intelligence or common sense." Only Lanchester's charm "made it bearable with her unique histrionic abilities." A more recent critique notes, "The movie is indeed charming and amusing; at least, it is for the length of time that it plays its story for silly comedy. Unfortunately, but not unexpectedly, the movie starts to take itself seriously at the half-way mark ..." Film critic Leonard Maltin described it as a "tidy programmer".
