= O.S.S. (film) =

1946 film by Irving Pichel

- Directed by: Irving Pichel
- Written by: Richard Maibaum
- Produced by: Richard Maibaum
- Starring: Alan Ladd; Geraldine Fitzgerald; Patric Knowles
- Cinematography: Lionel Lindon
- Edited by: William Shea
- Music by: Daniele Amfitheatrof; Heinz Roemheld
- Production company: Paramount Pictures
- Distributed by: Paramount Pictures
- Release date: May 26, 1946
- Running time: 108 minutes
- Country: United States
- Language: English
- Box office: $2.8 million (US rentals); 1,762,769 admissions (France)

O.S.S. is a 1946 American war spy film directed by Irving Pichel and starring Alan Ladd, Geraldine Fitzgerald and Patric Knowles. Produced and distributed by Paramount Pictures, it portrays the activities of the Office of Strategic Services during World War II. The screenplay was written by Richard Maibaum, a World War II veteran who would later write twelve of the first fifteen James Bond films. Maibaum, a former Broadway actor, also narrates the film.

== Plot ==
John Martin (Ladd) attempts to steal plans for an electric circuit from a plant in Baltimore, Maryland. Caught and arrested for espionage, he is turned over to the Office of Strategic Services, which is training a group of new recruits by sending them on test missions.

Along with three other men, Gates, Parker and Bernay, and one woman, Elaine Dupree (Fitzgerald), Martin (an assumed name like the others) is sent to France to blow up a railroad tunnel in order to paralyze Axis troops during the Allied invasion. Martin doubts Elaine can work under pressure because she is a woman, but she insists he treat her as any male agent.

During the group's first assignment, at a rural French inn, German agents kill Gates. A meeting of the French maquis is interrupted by German Colonel Paul Meister, who becomes immediately infatuated with Elaine. Elaine sculpts a bust of Meister's head, and when he announces his departure for Normandy on a troop train, she begs him to take her with him. With Martin's help, Elaine makes a duplicate bust and fills it with plastic explosives. She and Martin then blow up the tunnel. After Martin comes back for her under fire, Elaine makes him promise never to jeopardize a mission in order to rescue her.

On foot, they meet Bernay, who is their radio contact with the O.S.S. As the Allies break through at Normandy, Elaine and Martin make a deal with Amadeus Brink, an officer of the Gestapo, who hopes to secure his safety and a small fortune. Brink removes Martin and Elaine's "wanted" file from the Gestapo sector headquarters and arranges for his cousin, a courier, to hand over a diplomatic pouch to Bernay for photocopying. Bernay places the negative in the lining of Martin's hat. Against Brink's advice, Bernay radios a final message that the Nazis have broken one of the O.S.S. secret codes. Bernay is gunned down, and Martin and Elaine are questioned by the Gestapo, but are released before Meister catches Brink with their file papers.

Martin and Elaine are about to board a plane to safety when they are asked to complete one last mission. They must contact Parker, another agent who is on assignment near the Rhine, and Martin being the only agent he'll recognize. At a farmhouse, Elaine is accosted by a group of drunken German soldiers. Parker, hiding among them, gives Elaine the Germans' troop dispositions. Martin leaves the farmhouse to radio in the positions. While he is gone, Meister arrests Elaine.

As the American troops advance through France, Brady tells Martin that Elaine's real name was Ellen Rogers, and he imagines that she might have been the girl next door in his hometown.

== Cast ==
- Alan Ladd as Philip Masson / John Martin
- Geraldine Fitzgerald as Ellen Rogers / Elaine Dupree
- Patric Knowles as Cmdr Brady
- John Hoyt as Col. Paul Meister
- Gloria Saunders as WAC Operator Sparky
- Richard Webb as Parker
- Richard Benedict as Bernay
- Harold Vermilyea as Amadeus Brink
- Don Beddoe as Gates
- Onslow Stevens as Field
- Gavin Muir as Col. Crawson
- Egon Brecher as Marcel Aubert
- Joseph Crehan as Gen. Donovan
- Bobby Driscoll as Gerard
- Julia Dean as Madame Prideaux
- Crane Whitley as Arnheim
- Dorothy Adams as Claudette
- John Maxwell as LaFevre
- James Westerfield as Det. Roberts
- Edward Harvey as Williams
- Catherine Craig as Williams' Secretary
- Suzanne Ridgway as Cafe Patron

== Production ==
Richard Maibaum had just served four years in the army. He returned to Paramount, where he had been a screenwriter, and became a producer. He was assigned the job of writing and producing O.S.S. "Every studio in Hollywood was racing to come out with the first OSS film," says Maibaum. "When I was in Washington I knew some of the OSS people so I had a head start on the subject."

The studio had hoped to cast Sterling Hayden who had served in the OSS in real life. However he was still in uniform in early 1946 so the film was assigned to Alan Ladd, whose casting was announced in January 1946. It was one of three movies being made about the OSS in Hollywood around this time, the others being 13 Rue Madeleine and Cloak and Dagger. This resulted in filming taking place in extreme secrecy.

Shooting ended in March and the film was rushed into release. O.S.S. was the first of the three films to reach cinemas. "People had warned me about Alan and his wife Sue saying they were tough to work with but we got along marvellously," said Maibaum.

Director Pichel would later be blacklisted by the House Un-American Activities Committee.

== Reception ==
According to Maibaum the film "reaped substantial profits".

Maibaum and Ladd later collaborated on another OSS-related film, Captain Carey, U.S.A..

== Radio adaptation ==
O.S.S. was presented on Lux Radio Theatre November 18, 1946. The adaptation starred Ladd and Veronica Lake.
