= Terror in the Wax Museum =

1973 film

- Theatrical release poster
- Directed by: Georg Fenady
- Screenplay by: Jameson Brewer
- Story by: Andrew J. Fenady
- Produced by: Bing Crosby; Andrew J. Fenady; Charles A. Pratt
- Starring: Ray Milland; Elsa Lanchester; Maurice Evans; John Carradine; Broderick Crawford; Louis Hayward; Patric Knowles; Shani Wallis
- Cinematography: William B. Jurgensen
- Edited by: Melvin Shapiro
- Music by: George Duning
- Production companies: Andrew J. Fenady Productions; Bing Crosby Productions
- Distributed by: Cinerama Releasing Corporation
- Release date: May 1973
- Running time: 93 minutes
- Country: United States
- Language: English

Terror in the Wax Museum is a 1973 American horror mystery film directed by Georg Fenady (in his directorial debut) and starring Ray Milland, Elsa Lanchester, Maurice Evans, John Carradine, Broderick Crawford, Louis Hayward, Patric Knowles, and Shani Wallis. The film was released by Cinerama Releasing Corporation in May 1973. It is set in London at the end of the Victorian era.

== Plot ==
The setting is the 1890s. In the London wax museum of Claude Dupree, known for its collection of famous figures, someone is killing the guests. When Dupree is murdered, Margaret Collins, his niece, decides to continue the family business, which has long attracted the attention of the police.

The murder of the wax museum proprietor and some other strange goings-on in the vicinity prompt a police investigator to determine whether the killer is one of the principals who wants to own this piece of property, whether Jack the Ripper has returned to killing after a hiatus of ten years, or whether a wax statue or two has come to life.

== Cast ==
- Ray Milland as Harry Flexner
- Elsa Lanchester as Julia Hawthorn
- Maurice Evans as Inspector Daniels
- John Carradine as Claude Dupree
- Louis Hayward as Tim Fowley
- Patric Knowles as Mr. Southcott
- Broderick Crawford as Amos Burns
- Shani Wallis as Laurie Mell
- Mark Edwards as Sergeant Michael Hawks
- Lisa Lu as Madame Yang
- Steven Marlo as Karkov
- Nicole Shelby as Margaret Collins
- Ben Wright as First Constable
- Mathilda Calnan as First Charwoman
- Peggy Stewart as Second Charwoman
- Leslie Thompson as Constable Parker
- Don Herbert as Jack the Ripper - Wax Figure
- Judy Wetmore as Lizzie Borden - Wax Figure
- Jo Williamson as Mrs. Borden - Wax Figure
- George Farina as Bluebeard - Wax Figure
- Diane Wahrman as Girl in Red - Wax Figure
- Rosa Huerta as Lucretia Borgia - Wax Figure
- Ben Brown as Attila the Hun - Wax Figure
- Rickie Weir as Marie Antoinette - Wax Figure
- Paul Wilson as Ivan the Terrible - Wax Figure
- Ralph Cunningham as Willie Grossman - Wax Figure
- Don Williamson as Constable Henry Bolt - Wax Figure
- Evelyn Reynolds as Flower Woman - Wax Figure
- Sandy Helberg as Newsboy (uncredited)
