= Arnold (film) =

1973 film by Georg Fenady

- Theatrical release poster
- Directed by: Georg Fenady
- Written by: Jameson Brewer; John Fenton Murray
- Produced by: Andrew J. Fenady; Charles A. Pratt
- Starring: Stella Stevens; Roddy McDowall; Elsa Lanchester; Shani Wallis; Farley Granger; Victor Buono; John McGiver; Bernard Fox; Patric Knowles; Jamie Farr; Norman Stuart
- Cinematography: William B. Jurgensen
- Edited by: Melvin Shapiro
- Music by: George Duning
- Production companies: Fenady Associates; Bing Crosby Productions
- Distributed by: Cinerama Releasing Corporation
- Release date: November 16, 1973
- Running time: 95 minutes
- Country: United States
- Language: English
- Box office: $1.4 million

Arnold is a 1973 American horror comedy film directed by Georg Fenady and starring Stella Stevens, Roddy McDowall, Elsa Lanchester, Shani Wallis, Farley Granger, Victor Buono, John McGiver, Bernard Fox, Patric Knowles, Jamie Farr and Norman Stuart. The film was released by Cinerama Releasing Corporation on November 16, 1973.

In the film, a deceased lord is posthumously married to his lover, as part of a scheme that would allow her to inherit his estate. The deceased lord's family is not happy with this arrangement, and the various members seek ways to challenge his will. They are unaware that the lord wanted them dead, and that he has prepared deathtraps for his potential heirs.

== Plot ==
Lord Arnold Dwellyn and his lover Karen have just been married. However, this is no ordinary marriage because Arnold is a recent corpse. There are also interesting conditions: Arnold is not to be buried. His body will remain in the family mansion and Karen, in order to inherit his estate, must remain by him in the mansion permanently.

Not everyone is pleased by this arrangement, including Arnold's wastrel younger brother Robert (with whom Karen has been having a secret affair), his widow Lady Jocelyn and his solicitor cousin Douglas Whitehead; in fact, the only one who is happy with the situation is Arnold's sister Hester.

When everybody starts trying to find ways of breaking Arnold's will and trying to find a huge sum of cash hidden somewhere on the family estate, mysterious deathtraps, apparently planned by Arnold well in advance of his death and tailored to each of the victims, begin dealing with the claimants and all this while the local constable is investigating the mysterious deaths in a less than effective manner.

== Cast ==
- Stella Stevens as Karen
- Roddy McDowall as Robert
- Elsa Lanchester as Hester
- Shani Wallis as Lady Jocelyn Dwellyn
- Farley Granger as Evan Lyons
- Victor Buono as Minister
- John McGiver as Governor
- Bernard Fox as Constable Hooke
- Patric Knowles as Douglas Whitehead
- Jamie Farr as Dybbi
- Norman Stuart as Lord Arnold Dwellyn
  - Murray Matheson provides the uncredited voice of Lord Arnold Dwellyn
- Ben Wright as Jonesy
- Wanda Bailey as Flo
