= Fintan Meyler =

Irish-American actress (1929–2005)

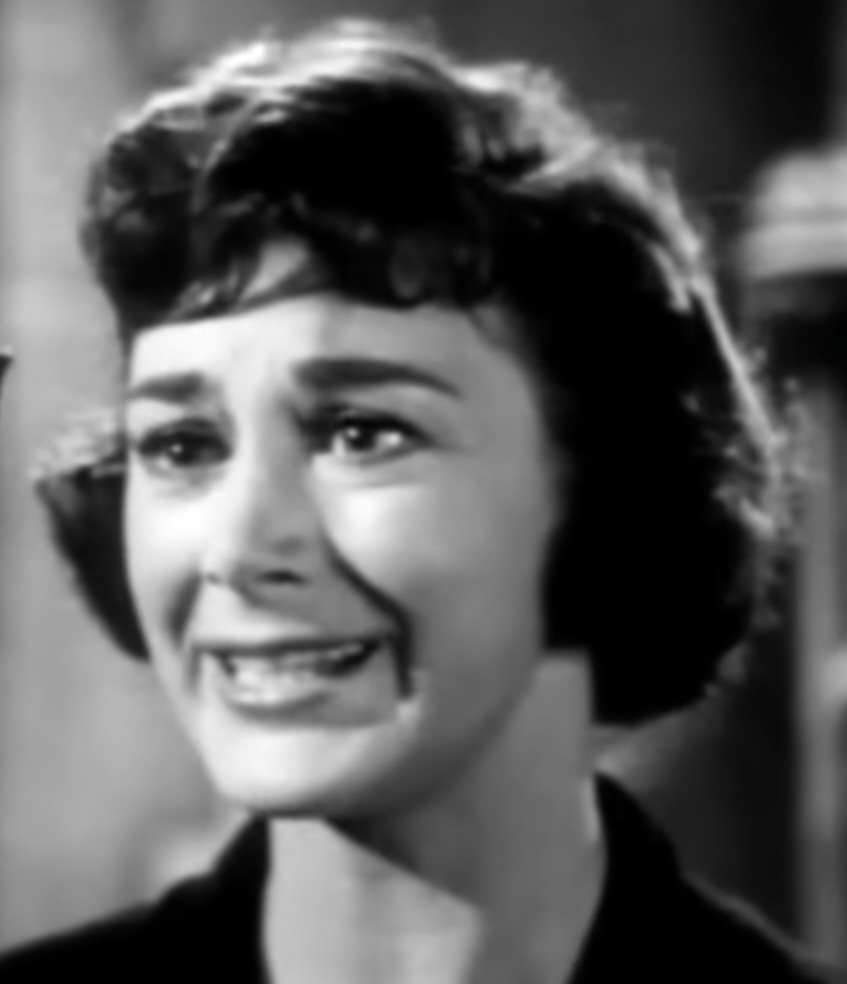
- Meyler in an episode of One Step Beyond (1959)
- Born: Gertrude Anne Meyler; 14 December 1929; Wexford, Ireland
- Died: 23 July 2005 (aged 75); San Jose, California, U.S.
- Occupation: Actress
- Years active: 1957–1973
- Spouses: Paul Cary Fisher (m. 1974; div. 1975); Robert Wolcott Champion (m. 1960; div. 1972)
- Children: 2

Fintan Meyler (born Gertrude Anne Meyler; 14 December 1929 – 23 July 2005) was an Irish-American actress on stage, on television, and in films. Meyler was one of seven children.

== Biography ==
Her early education came at a convent in Dublin, before she began studying acting at the Gate Theatre in Dublin. She was chosen Miss Ireland in 1950, which led to her coming to the United States. Meyler never left. Eventually, she made her way to California. Her first TV role was on Matinee Theater. Under the name Fintan Meyler, she starred in over 30 different TV shows. She portrayed memorable characters in shows, such as The Donna Reed Show, Perry Mason, Bonanza, The Rebel, Have Gun - Will Travel and Gunsmoke. In the 1959 Perry Mason episode "The Case of the Howling Dog", she played Thelma Brent.

Perhaps best known among her film roles was the "Hysterical Woman" in Zero Hour! in a scene that was memorably spoofed 22 years later in Airplane!, then with Lee Bryant in the part.

She died of cancer in San Jose, California.

== Filmography ==
Year	Title	Role	Notes
1957	The Abductors	Citizens of Springfield and Chicago	
1957	Zero Hour!	Hysterical Woman	
1958	Showdown at Boot Hill	Sally Crane	
1960	"Gunsmoke"	Jeanne	
