= Elsa Lanchester =

British-American actress (1902–1986)

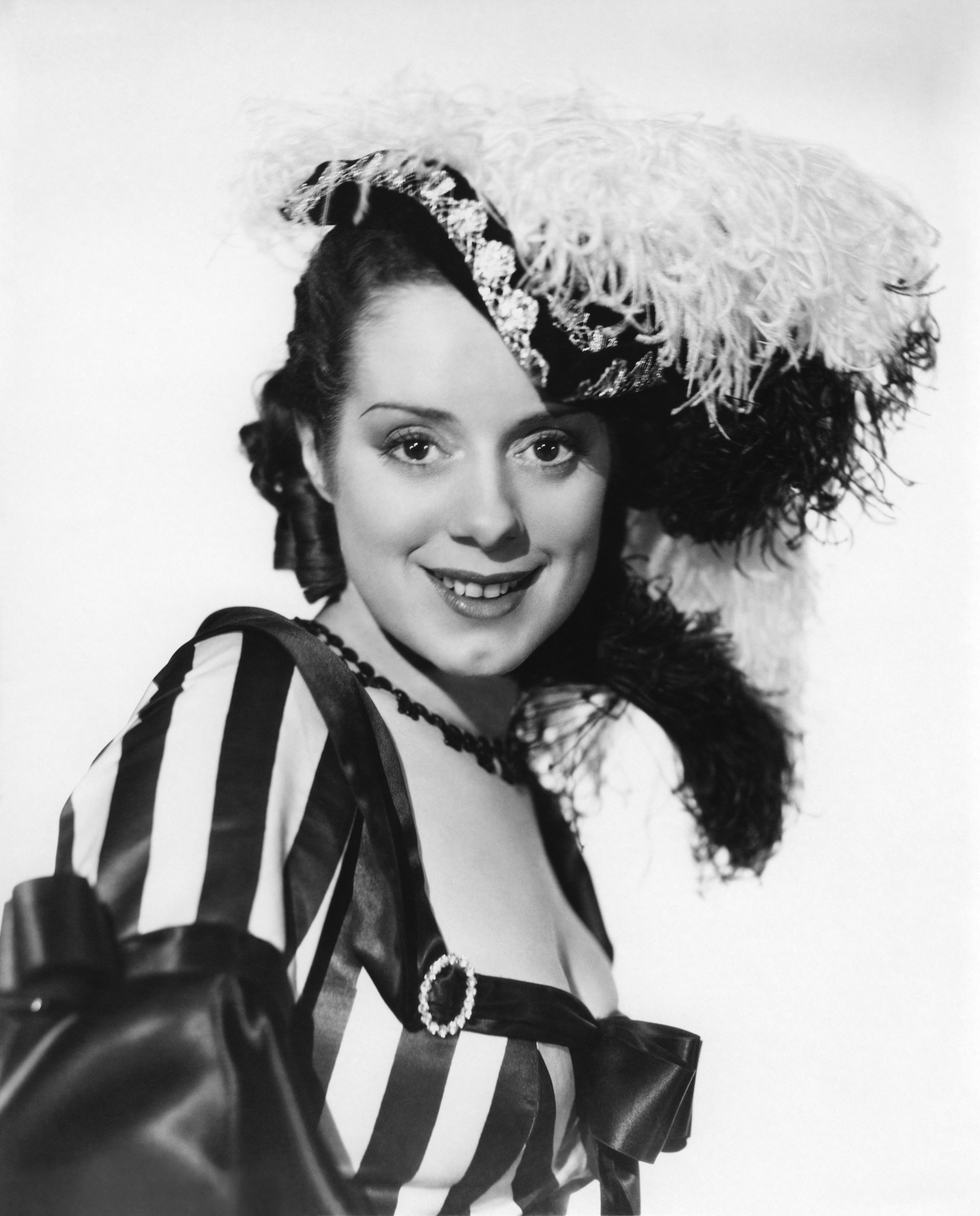
- Lanchester in 1935
- Born: Elsa Sullivan Lanchester; 28 October 1902; Lewisham, London, England
- Died: 26 December 1986 (aged 84); Los Angeles, California, U.S.
- Occupation: Actress
- Years active: 1925–1983
- Spouse: Charles Laughton (m. 1929; died 1962)
- Parent: Edith Lanchester (mother)
- Relatives: Waldo Lanchester (brother)

Elsa Sullivan Lanchester (28 October 1902 – 26 December 1986) was a British actress with a long career in theatre, film and television.

Lanchester studied dance as a child and after the First World War began performing in theatre and cabaret, where she established her career over the following decade. She met the actor Charles Laughton in 1927, and they were married two years later. She began playing small roles in British films, including the role of Anne of Cleves with Laughton in The Private Life of Henry VIII (1933). Her success in American films resulted in the couple moving to Hollywood, where Lanchester played small film roles.

Her role as the title character in Bride of Frankenstein (1935) brought her recognition. She played the lead in Passport to Destiny (1944) and supporting roles through the 1940s and 1950s. She was nominated for the Academy Award for Best Supporting Actress for Come to the Stable (1949) and Witness for the Prosecution (1957), the latter of which was the last of twelve films in which she appeared with Laughton. Following Laughton's death in 1962, Lanchester resumed her career with appearances in such Disney films as Mary Poppins (1964), Pajama Party (1964), That Darn Cat! (1965) and Blackbeard's Ghost (1968). The horror film Willard (1971) was highly successful, and one of her last roles was in Murder by Death (1976).

== Early life ==
Elsa Sullivan Lanchester was born in Lewisham, London. Her parents, James "Séamus" Sullivan (1872–1945) and Edith "Biddy" Lanchester (1871–1966), were Bohemians, and refused to marry in a religious or legal way as a rebellion against Edwardian era society. Sullivan and Lanchester were both socialists, according to Lanchester's 1970 interview with Dick Cavett. Elsa's older brother, Waldo Sullivan Lanchester, born five years earlier, was a puppeteer, with his own marionette company based in Malvern, Worcestershire, and later in Stratford-upon-Avon. Elsa studied dance in Paris under Isadora Duncan, whom she disliked. When the school was discontinued due to outbreak of World War I, she returned to the UK. At that point (she was about twelve years of age) she began teaching dance in the Duncan style and gave classes to children in her south London district, through which she earned some welcome extra income for her household.

== Career ==
After World War I, Lanchester started the Children's Theatre, and later the Cave of Harmony, a nightclub at which modern plays and cabaret turns were performed. She revived old Victorian songs and ballads, many of which she retained for her performances in another revue entitled Riverside Nights. Her first film performance came in 1924 in the amateur production The Scarlet Woman, which was written by Evelyn Waugh who also appeared in two roles himself.

She became sufficiently famous for Columbia to invite her into the recording studio to make 78 rpm discs of four of the numbers she sang in these revues, with piano arrangement and accompaniment by Kay Henderson: "Please Sell No More Drink to My Father" and "He Didn't Oughter" were on one disc (recorded in 1926) and "Don't Tell My Mother I'm Living in Sin" and "The Ladies Bar" were on the other (recorded 1930). Her cabaret and nightclub appearances led to more serious stage work and it was in a play by Arnold Bennett called Mr Prohack (1927) that Lanchester first met another member of the cast, Charles Laughton. They were married two years later and continued to act together from time to time, both on stage and screen. She played his daughter in the stage play Payment Deferred (1931) though not in the subsequent Hollywood film version. Lanchester and Laughton appeared in the Old Vic season of 1933–34, playing Shakespeare, Chekhov and Wilde, and in 1936 she was Peter Pan to Laughton's Captain Hook in J. M. Barrie's play at the London Palladium. Their last stage appearance together was in Jane Arden's The Party (1958) at the New Theatre, London.

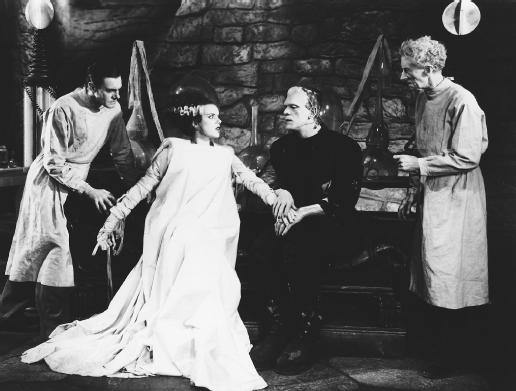
Colin Clive, Lanchester, Boris Karloff and Ernest Thesiger in Bride of Frankenstein (1935)

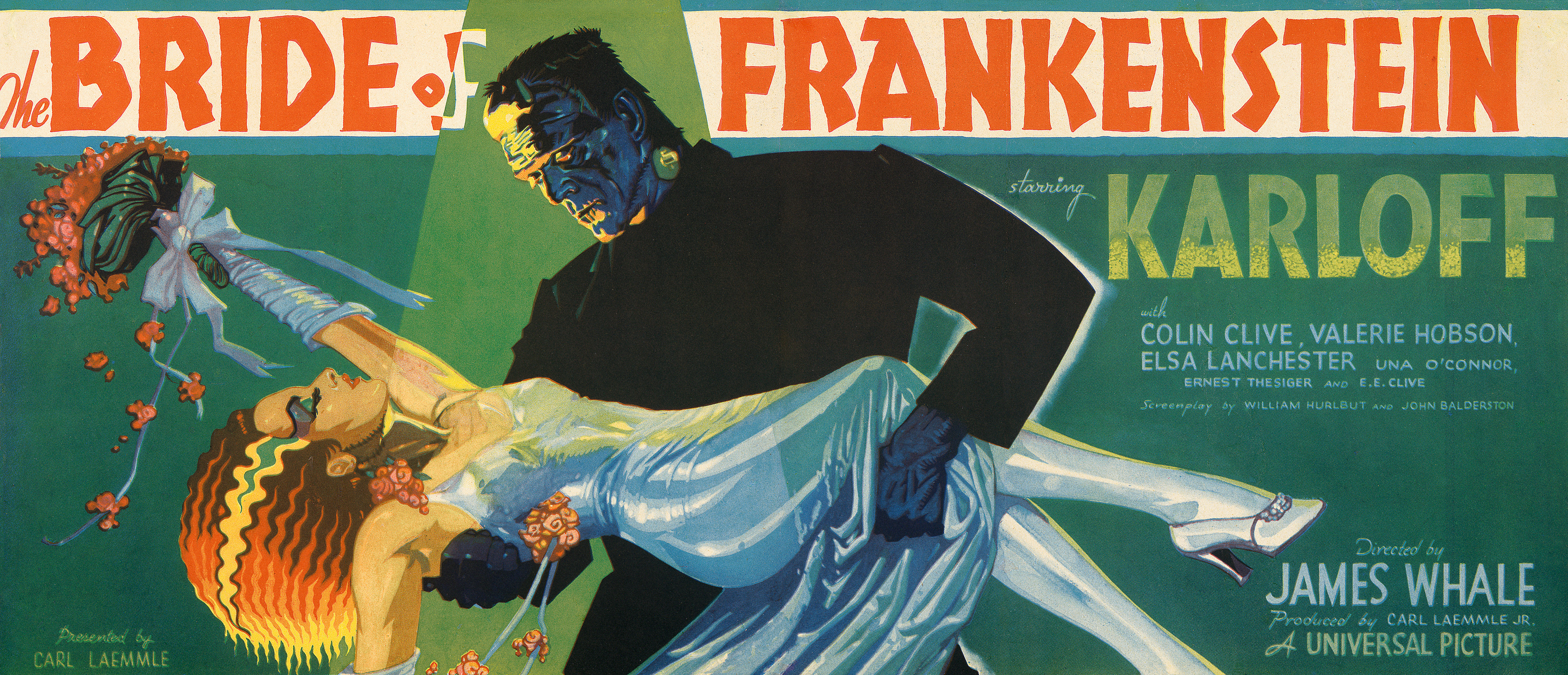
Universal's art director Karoly Grosz designed this 1935 advertisement featuring Lanchester and Boris Karloff.

Lanchester made her film debut in The Scarlet Woman (1925) and in 1928 appeared in three silent shorts written for her by H. G. Wells and directed by Ivor Montagu: Blue Bottles, Daydreams and The Tonic. Laughton made brief appearances in all of them. They also appeared together in a 1930 film revue entitled Comets, featuring British stage, musical and variety acts, in which they sang in duet "The Ballad of Frankie and Johnnie". Lanchester appeared in several other early British talkies, including Potiphar's Wife (1931), a film starring Laurence Olivier. She appeared opposite Laughton again as Anne of Cleves in The Private Life of Henry VIII (1933), with Laughton in the title role. Laughton was by now making films in Hollywood, so Lanchester joined him there, making minor appearances in David Copperfield (1935) and Naughty Marietta (1935). These and her appearances in British films helped her gain the title role in Bride of Frankenstein (1935), arguably the role with which she remains most identified. She and Laughton returned to Britain to appear together again in Rembrandt (1936) and later in Vessel of Wrath (US: The Beachcomber. 1938). They both returned to Hollywood, where he made The Hunchback of Notre Dame (1939) although Lanchester didn't appear in another film until Ladies in Retirement (1941). She and Laughton played husband and wife (their characters were named Charles and Elsa Smith) in Tales of Manhattan (1942) and they both appeared again in the all-star, mostly British cast of Forever and a Day (1943). She received top billing in Passport to Destiny (1944) for the only time in her Hollywood career.

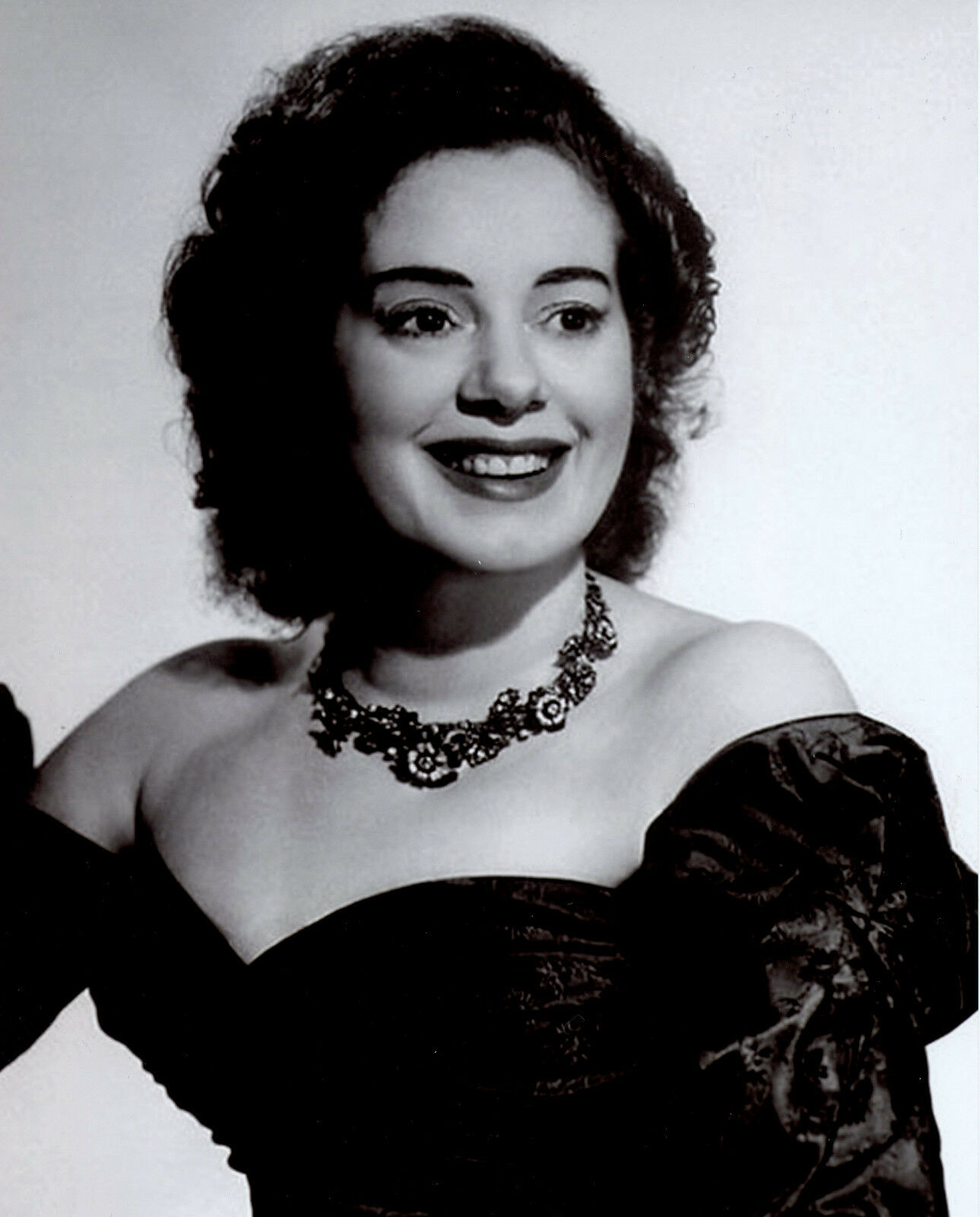
Lanchester in the 1940s

Lanchester played supporting roles in The Spiral Staircase and The Razor's Edge (both 1946). She appeared as the housekeeper in The Bishop's Wife (1947) with David Niven playing the bishop, Loretta Young his wife, and Cary Grant an angel. Lanchester played a comical role as an artist in the thriller, The Big Clock (1948), in which Laughton starred as a megalomaniacal press tycoon. She had a part as a painter specialising in nativity scenes in Come to the Stable (1949), for which she was nominated for the Academy Award for Best Supporting Actress (1949). During the late 1940s and 1950s she appeared in small but highly varied supporting roles in a number of films while simultaneously appearing on stage at the Turnabout Theatre in Hollywood. Here she performed her solo vaudeville act in conjunction with a marionette show, singing somewhat off-colour songs which she later recorded for a couple of LPs. Onscreen, she appeared alongside Danny Kaye in The Inspector General (1949), played a blackmailing landlady in Mystery Street (1950), and was Shelley Winters's travelling companion in Frenchie (1950). More supporting roles followed in the early 1950s, including a 2-minute cameo as the Bearded Lady in 3 Ring Circus (1954), about to be shaved by Jerry Lewis. She had another substantial and memorable part when she appeared again with her husband in Witness for the Prosecution (1957) a screen version of Agatha Christie's 1953 play for which both received Academy Award nominations – she for the second time as Best Supporting Actress, and Laughton for the third time for Best Actor. Neither won. However she did win the Golden Globe for Best Supporting Actress for the film.

Lanchester played the role of Aunt Queenie, a witch in Bell, Book and Candle (1958), and appeared in such films as Mary Poppins (1964), in which her husband's goddaughter Karen Dotrice also starred, That Darn Cat! (1965), and Blackbeard's Ghost (1968). She appeared on 9 April 1959, on NBC's The Ford Show, Starring Tennessee Ernie Ford. She performed in two episodes of NBC's The Wonderful World of Disney. Additionally, she had memorable guest roles in an episode of I Love Lucy in 1956 and in episodes of NBC's The Eleventh Hour (1964) and The Man From U.N.C.L.E. (1965). Lanchester continued to make occasional film appearances, singing a duet with Elvis Presley in Easy Come, Easy Go (1967), and playing the mother in the original version of Willard (1971), alongside Bruce Davison and Ernest Borgnine, which scored well at the box office. She was Jessica Marbles, a sleuth based on Agatha Christie's Jane Marple, in the 1976 murder mystery spoof Murder by Death, and she made her last film in 1980 as Sophie in Die Laughing. She released three LP albums in the 1950s. Two (referred to above) were entitled Songs for a Shuttered Parlour and Songs for a Smoke-Filled Room, and were vaguely lewd and danced around their true purpose, such as the song about her husband's "clock" not working. Laughton provided the spoken introductions to each number and even joined Lanchester in the singing of "She Was Poor but She Was Honest". Her third LP was entitled Cockney London, a selection of old London songs for which Laughton wrote the sleeve-notes.

== Personal life ==
Lanchester married Charles Laughton in 1929. In 1938 she published a book about her relationship with Laughton, Charles Laughton and I. In March 1983, she released an autobiography, titled Elsa Lanchester Herself. In that book, she writes that she and Laughton never had children because he was homosexual. However, Laughton's friend and co-star Maureen O'Hara denied this was the reason for the couple's childlessness. She said Laughton had told her that the reason he and his wife never had children was because of a botched abortion Lanchester had early in her career when performing burlesque. Lanchester admitted in her autobiography that she had two abortions in her youth (one being Laughton's), but it is not clear if the second left her incapable of becoming pregnant again. According to biographer Charles Higham, the reason she did not have children was that she did not want any.

Lanchester was an atheist.

In 1984, Lanchester's health deteriorated. Within 30 months, she had suffered two strokes, becoming totally incapacitated. She required constant care and was confined to bedrest. In March 1986, the Motion Picture and Television Fund filed to become conservator of Lanchester and her estate, which was valued at $900,000.

== Death ==
Lanchester died in Woodland Hills, Los Angeles, California, on 26 December 1986, aged 84, at the Motion Picture Hospital from bronchial pneumonia. Her body was cremated on 5 January 1987, at the Chapel of the Pines in Los Angeles and for decades it was believed that her ashes were scattered over the Pacific Ocean. In 2025, however, it was discovered that her cremated remains were instead interred by Herschel Green, her agent, at Valhalla Memorial Park under her married name, Elsa Lanchester Laughton. Scott Michaels of Dearly Departed Tours arranged a fundraiser and ceremony for the unveiling ceremony of a formal wall marker that was held on 28 October 2025, her 123rd birthday.

== Filmography ==
=== Film roles ===
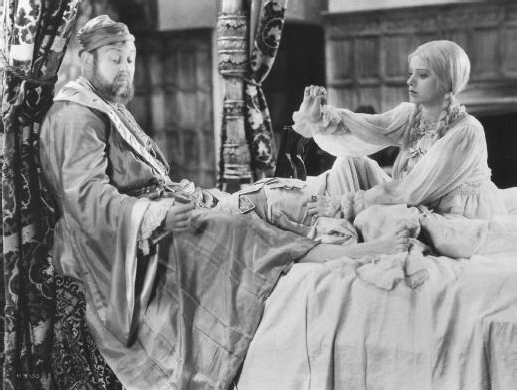
With Charles Laughton in The Private Life of Henry VIII (1933)

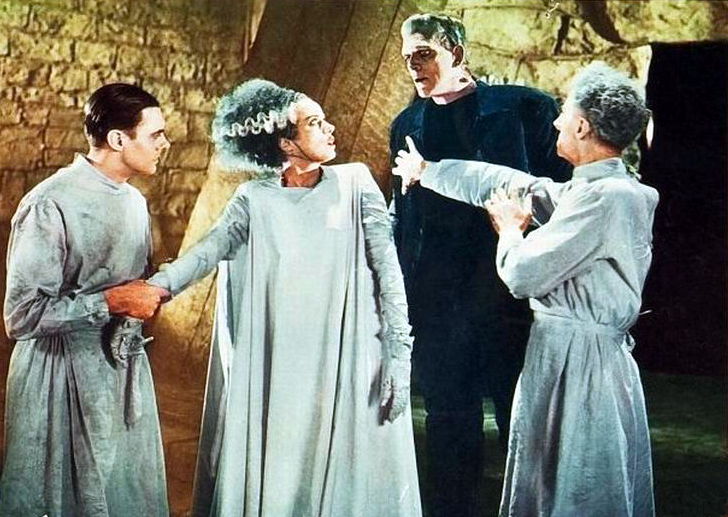
Colin Clive, Lanchester, Boris Karloff and Ernest Thesiger in Bride of Frankenstein (1935)

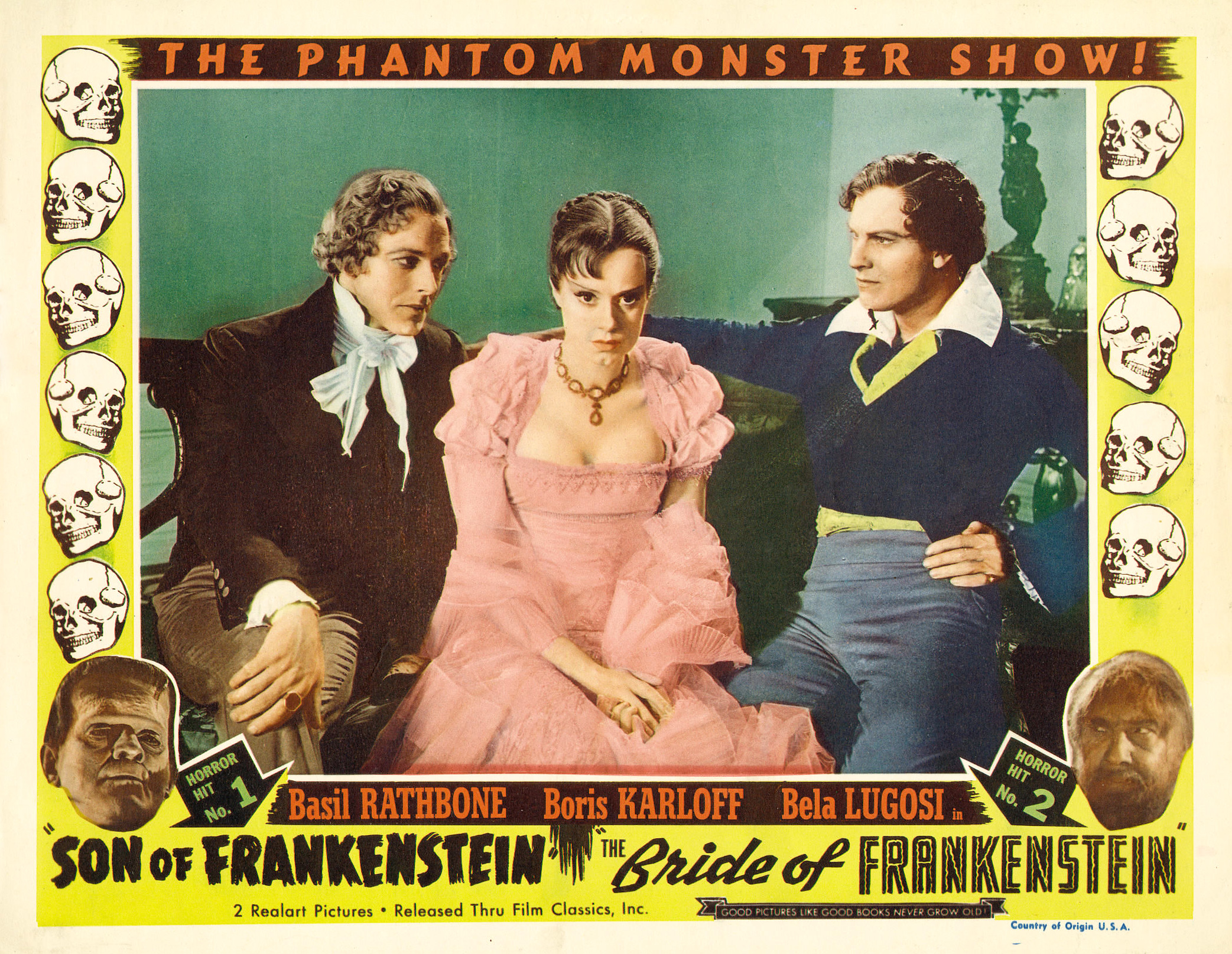
Lobby card for re-release of Bride of Frankenstein with Douglas Walton as Percy Bysshe Shelley, Lanchester as Mary Wollstonecraft Shelley and Gavin Gordon as Lord Byron

| Year | Title | Role | Notes |
|---|---|---|---|
| 1927 | One of the Best | Kitty | Silent film |
| 1928 | The Constant Nymph | Lady | Silent film |
| 1931 | The Love Habit | Mathilde | |
| 1931 | The Officers' Mess | Cora Melville | |
| 1931 | The Stronger Sex | Thompson | |
| 1931 | Potiphar's Wife | Therese | |
| 1933 | The Private Life of Henry VIII | Anne of Cleves, the Fourth Wife | |
| 1935 | David Copperfield | Clickett | |
| 1935 | Naughty Marietta | Madame d'Annard | |
| 1935 | Bride of Frankenstein | Mary Shelley/The Monster's Mate | |
| 1935 | The Ghost Goes West | Miss Shepperton | |
| 1936 | Rembrandt | Hendrickje Stoffels | |
| 1938 | Vessel of Wrath | Martha Jones | |
| 1941 | Ladies in Retirement | Emily Creed | |
| 1942 | Son of Fury: The Story of Benjamin Blake | Bristol Isabel | |
| 1942 | Tales of Manhattan | Elsa (Mrs Charles) Smith | |
| 1942 | Forever and a Day | Mamie | |
| 1942 | Thumbs Up | Emma Finch | |
| 1942 | Lassie Come Home | Mrs. Carraclough | |
| 1944 | Passport to Destiny | Ella Muggins | |
| 1946 | The Spiral Staircase | Mrs. Oates | |
| 1946 | The Razor's Edge | Miss Keith | |
| 1947 | Northwest Outpost | Princess "Tanya" Tatiana | |
| 1947 | The Bishop's Wife | Matilda | |
| 1948 | The Big Clock | Louise Patterson | |
| 1949 | The Secret Garden | Martha | |
| 1949 | Come to the Stable | Amelia Potts | Academy Award nomination for Best Supporting Actress |
| 1949 | The Inspector General | Maria | |
| 1949 | Buccaneer's Girl | Mme. Brizar | |
| 1950 | Mystery Street | Mrs. Smerrling | |
| 1950 | The Petty Girl | Dr. Crutcher | |
| 1950 | Frenchie | Countess | |
| 1952 | Dreamboat | Dr. Mathilda Coffey | |
| 1952 | Les Misérables | Madame Magloire | |
| 1952 | Androcles and the Lion | Megaera | |
| 1953 | The Girls of Pleasure Island | Thelma | |
| 1954 | Hell's Half Acre | Lida O'Reilly | |
| 1954 | 3 Ring Circus | the Bearded Lady | |
| 1955 | The Glass Slipper | Widow Sonder | |
| 1957 | Witness for the Prosecution | Miss Plimsoll | Academy Award nomination for Best Supporting Actress Golden Globe Award winner for Best Supporting Actress – Motion Picture |
| 1958 | Bell, Book and Candle | Aunt Queenie Holroyd | |
| 1964 | Honeymoon Hotel | Chambermaid | |
| 1964 | Mary Poppins | Katie Nanna | |
| 1964 | Pajama Party | Aunt Wendy | |
| 1965 | That Darn Cat! | Mrs. MacDougall | |
| 1967 | Easy Come, Easy Go | Madame Neherina | |
| 1968 | Blackbeard's Ghost | Emily Stowecroft | |
| 1969 | Rascal | Mrs. Satterfield | |
| 1969 | Me, Natalie | Miss Dennison | |
| 1971 | Willard | Henrietta Stiles | |
| 1973 | Terror in the Wax Museum | Julia Hawthorn | |
| 1973 | Arnold | Hester | |
| 1976 | Murder by Death | Jessica Marbles | |
| 1980 | Die Laughing | Sophie | Final film role |

=== Short subjects ===
| Year | Title | Role | Notes |
|---|---|---|---|
| 1925 | The Scarlet Woman: An Ecclesiastical Melodrama | Beatrice de Carolle | |
| 1928 | The Tonic | Elsa | |
| 1928 | Daydreams | Elsa / Heroine in Dream Sequence | |
| 1928 | Blue Bottles | Elsa | |
| 1929 | Mr. Smith Wakes Up | | |
| 1930 | Comets | Herself | |
| 1930 | Ashes | Girl | |
| 1936 | Miss Bracegirdle Does Her Duty | Millicent Bracegirdle | Unreleased |

=== Television films ===
| Year | Title | Role |
|---|---|---|
| 1955 | Alice in Wonderland | The Red Queen |
| 1962 | The Flood | Noah's Wife (voice) |
| 1969 | In Name Only | Gertrude Caruso |
| 1979 | Where's Poppa? | Momma Hocheiser |

=== Partial television credits ===
- I Love Lucy (1956) as Mrs Edna Grundy, episode "Off to Florida"
- Alfred Hitchcock Hour (1964) "The McGregor Affair" as Aggie McGregor
- The Man from U.N.C.L.E. (1965) as Dr. Agnes Dabree, episode "The Brain-Killer Affair"
- Walt Disney's Wonderful World of Color (1969) as Mrs. Formby, episodes "My Dog, the Thief, parts 1 and 2"
- The Bill Cosby Show (1970) as Mrs. Wochuk, episode "The Elevator Doesn't Stop Here Anymore"
- Nanny and the Professor (1971) as Aunt Henrietta (3 episodes)
- Night Gallery (1972) as Lydia Bowen, episode "Green Fingers"
- Here's Lucy (1973) as Mumsie Westcott, episode "Lucy Goes to Prison"
- Mannix (1973) as Portia Penhaven, episode "A Matter of Principle"
- Then Came Bronson (1970) as Hattie Caulder episode 4 "The Circle Of Time"

== Bibliography ==
- Callow, Simon (1987). Charles Laughton: A Difficult Actor. Mt Prospect, Illinois: Fromm International. ISBN 978-0-31224-377-7.
- Higham, Charles (1976). Charles Laughton: An Intimate Biography. New York: Doubleday. ISBN 978-0-38509-403-0.
- Jewell, Richard; Harbin, Vernon (1982). The RKO Story. New Rochelle, New York: Arlington House. ISBN 978-0-70641-285-7.
- Lanchester, Elsa (1938). Charles Laughton and I. San Diego, California: Harcourt, Brace Jovanovich. ISBN 0-15-164019-X.
- —— (1984). Elsa Lanchester Herself. New York: St. Martin's Press. ISBN 978-0-31224-377-7.
- Maltin, Leonard (1994). "Elsa Lanchester". Leonard Maltin's Movie Encyclopedia. New York: Dutton. ISBN 0-525-93635-1.
- Mank, Gregory William (1999). Women in Horror Films, 1930s. Jefferson, North Carolina: McFarland & Company. ISBN 978-0-78640-553-4.
- Singer, Kurt (1952). The Charles Laughton Story. London: R. Hale.
- —— (1954). The Laughton story; An Intimate Story of Charles Laughton. Philadelphia: Winston.
