= Charles Laughton on stage and screen =

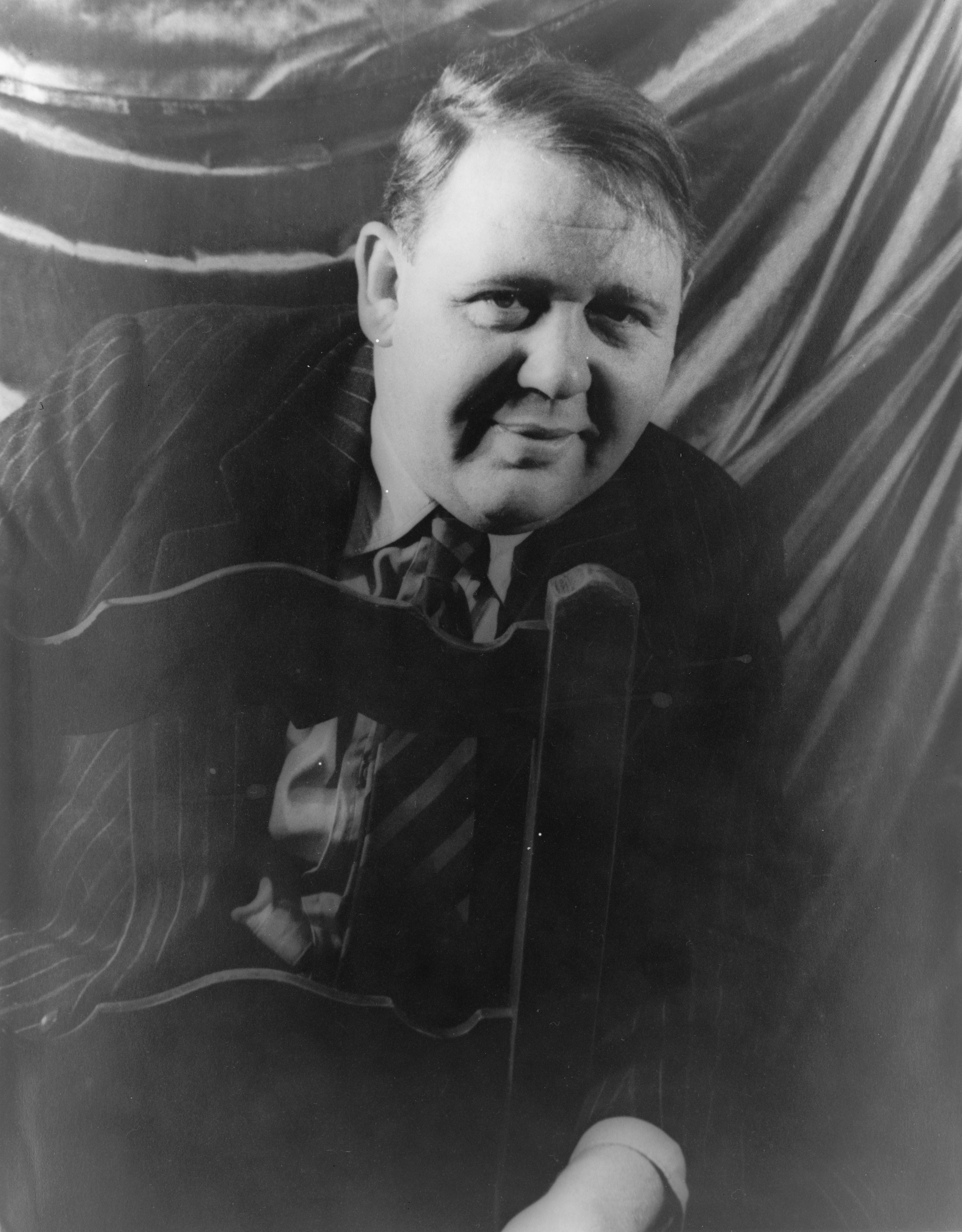
Charles Laughton in 1940.

Charles Laughton was an English actor known for his intense and varied roles across stage and screen. In 1927, he was cast in a play with his future wife Elsa Lanchester, with whom he lived and worked until his death.

Laughton made his film debut in a 1928 short film entitled, The Tonic before taking minor roles in feature-length films in the early 1930s. Laughton later earned the Academy Award for Best Actor for his portrayal of the title character in the historical drama The Private Life of Henry VIII (1933). He earned further Academy Award nominations for his roles as Captain William Bligh in the action adventure Mutiny on the Bounty (1935) and an irascible barrister in the courtroom drama Witness for the Prosecution (1957).

Among Laughton's biggest film hits were romance drama The Barretts of Wimpole Street (1934), the comedy Ruggles of Red Gap (1935), the biographical drama Rembrandt (1936), the thriller Jamaica Inn (1939), the drama The Hunchback of Notre Dame (1939), the noir-thriller The Big Clock (1948), the historical drama Young Bess (1953), the romance Hobson's Choice (1954) and the adventure epic Spartacus (1960). His final film role was in the political drama Advise & Consent (1962).

== Acting credits ==
=== Filmography ===
Unless otherwise stated the films are U.S. productions in black and white.

| Year | Title | Role | Notes |
|---|---|---|---|
| 1928 | The Tonic | Father of the Family | Filmed in England; Short, (film debut) |
| 1928 | Daydreams | Lecherous Boarder; Ram Das in Dream Sequence | Filmed in England; Short |
| 1928 | Blue Bottles | Burglar | Filmed in England; Short |
| 1929 | Piccadilly | A Nightclub Diner | Filmed in England |
| 1930 | Comets | Himself | Filmed in England |
| 1930 | Wolves | Captain Job | Filmed in England |
| 1931 | Down River | Captain Grossman | Filmed in England |
| 1932 | Devil and the Deep | Commander Charles Sturm | |
| 1932 | The Old Dark House | Sir William Porterhouse | |
| 1932 | Payment Deferred | William Marble | |
| 1932 | If I Had A Million | Phineas V. Lambert | |
| 1932 | The Sign of the Cross | Emperor Nero | |
| 1932 | Island of Lost Souls | Dr. Moreau | |
| 1933 | The Private Life of Henry VIII | King Henry VIII | Filmed in England; Academy Award for Best Actor |
| 1933 | White Woman | Horace H. Prin | |
| 1934 | The Barretts of Wimpole Street | Edward Moulton-Barrett | |
| 1935 | Ruggles of Red Gap | Marmaduke Ruggles | |
| 1935 | Les Misérables | Inspector Javert | |
| 1935 | Mutiny on the Bounty | Captain William Bligh | |
| 1936 | Rembrandt | Rembrandt van Rijn | Filmed in England |
| 1937 | I, Claudius | Claudius | Filmed in England Unfinished and abandoned |
| 1938 | Vessel of Wrath | Ginger "Ted" Wilson | Produced by Laughton via Mayflower Pictures; Filmed in England (Note: Released in the United States as The Beachcomber) |
| 1938 | Sidewalks of London | Charles Staggers | Produced by Laughton via Mayflower Pictures; Filmed in England (Note: Released in the United States as Sidewalks of London) |
| 1939 | Jamaica Inn | Sir Humphrey Pengallan | Produced by Laughton via Mayflower Pictures; Filmed in England |
| 1939 | The Hunchback of Notre Dame | Quasimodo | |
| 1940 | They Knew What They Wanted | Tony Patucci | |
| 1941 | It Started with Eve | Jonathan Reynolds | |
| 1942 | The Tuttles of Tahiti | Jonas Tuttle | |
| 1942 | Tales of Manhattan | Charles Smith | |
| 1942 | Stand By for Action | Rear Admiral Stephen Thomas | |
| 1943 | Forever and a Day | Bellamy (Dexter's Butler) | |
| 1943 | This Land is Mine | Albert Lory | |
| 1943 | The Man From Down Under | Jocko Wilson | |
| 1944 | Passport to Destiny | Sgt. Major Henry Albert Muggins | Photo; Uncredited |
| 1944 | The Canterville Ghost | Sir Simon de Canterville / The Ghost | |
| 1944 | The Suspect | Philip Marshall | |
| 1945 | Captain Kidd | Captain William Kidd | |
| 1946 | Because of Him | John Sheridan | |
| 1947 | The Paradine Case | Judge Lord Thomas Horfield | |
| 1947 | Leben des Galilei | Galileo Galilei | A 30-minute 'short'. (Note: Collaborated on the translation of the play by Bertolt Brecht.) |
| 1948 | A Miracle Can Happen | Reverend John B. Dunne | Laughton's scenes cut in American release (Note: replaced by Lamour sequence) (Note: replaced by On Our Merry Way) |
| 1948 | Arch of Triumph | Ivon Haake | |
| 1948 | The Big Clock | Earl Janoth | |
| 1948 | The Girl from Manhattan | The Bishop | |
| 1949 | The Bribe | J. J. Bealer | |
| 1949 | The Man on the Eiffel Tower | Inspector Jules Maigret | Anscocolor |
| 1951 | The Blue Veil | Fred K. Begley | |
| 1951 | The Strange Door | Sire Alain de Maletroit | |
| 1952 | O. Henry's Full House | Soapy | Segment: "The Cop and the Anthem" |
| 1952 | Abbott and Costello Meet Captain Kidd | Capt. William Kidd | SuperCinecolor |
| 1953 | Salome | King Herod | Technicolor |
| 1953 | Young Bess | King Henry VIII | Technicolor |
| 1954 | Hobson's Choice | Henry Horatio Hobson | Filmed in England |
| 1955 | The Night of the Hunter | — | Directed by Laughton |
| 1957 | Witness for the Prosecution | Sir Wilfrid Robarts | |
| 1960 | Sotto dieci bandiere | Admiral Russell | Filmed in Italy (Note: Released in the United States and UK as Under Ten Flags) |
| 1960 | Spartacus | Sempronius Gracchus | Super Technirama 70; Technicolor |
| 1962 | Advise & Consent | Sen. Seabright Cooley | Final film role |

=== Television ===
Laughton guest starred in a few television shows.

- What's My Line? (1956–1960) as Himself (2 episodes)
- Wagon Train (1960) as Colonel Albert Farnsworth (1 episode)
- Checkmate (1961) as Reverend Wister (1 episode)

== Theatre ==
=== Actor ===
| Year | Title | Role | Playwright | Venue | Ref. |
|---|---|---|---|---|---|
| 1926 | The Government Inspector | Osip | Nikolai Gogol | Barnes Theatre, London | |
| 1926 | Pillars of Society | Rummel | Henrik Ibsen | Everyman Theatre, London | |
| 1926 | The Cherry Orchard | Yepi Khodov | Anton Chekhov | Barnes Theatre, London | |
| 1926 | Three Sisters | Vassily Solyony | Anton Chekhov | Barnes Theatre, London | |
| 1928 | Alibi | Hercule Poirot | Agatha Christie | Theatre Royal Haymarket, London | |
| 1928 | The Silver Tassie | Harry Heegan | Seán O'Casey | Apollo Theatre, London | |
| 1930 | On the Spot | Tony Perelli | Edgar Wallace | Wyndham's Theatre, London | |
| 1931 | Payment Deferred | William Marble | C. S. Forester | St. James's Theatre, London | |
| 1931 | Payment Deferred | William Marble | C. S. Forester | Lyceum Theater, Broadway | |
| 1932 | The Fatal Alibi | Hercule Poirot | Agatha Christie | Booth Theatre, Broadway | |
| 1933 | Henry VIII | Henry VIII | William Shakespeare | The Old Vic, London | |
| 1933 | Measure for Measure | Angelo | William Shakespeare | The Old Vic, London | |
| 1933–34 | The Cherry Orchard | Lopakhin | Anton Chekhov | The Old Vic, London | |
| 1934 | The Tempest | Prospero | William Shakespeare | The Old Vic, London | |
| 1934 | The Importance of Being Earnest | Canon Chasuble | Oscar Wilde | The Old Vic, London | |
| 1934 | Love for Love | Tattle | William Congreve | Sadler's Wells, London | |
| 1934 | Macbeth | Macbeth | William Shakespeare | The Old Vic, London | |
| 1936–37 | Peter Pan | Captain Hook | J. M. Barrie | London Palladium, London | |
| 1947 | Galileo | Galileo | Bertolt Brecht | Maxine Elliott Theatre, Broadway | |
| 1950 | The Cherry Orchard | Gaev | Anton Chekhov | Stage Theatre, Los Angeles | |
| 1956–57 | Major Barbara | Andrew Undershaft | George Bernard Shaw | Martin Beck Theatre, Broadway | |
| 1958 | The Party | Richard Brough | Jane Arden | New Theatre, London | |
| 1959 | A Midsummer Night's Dream | Bottom | William Shakespeare | Stratford-upon-Avon, UK | |
| 1959 | King Lear | Lear | William Shakespeare | Stratford-upon-Avon, UK | |

=== Director ===
| Year | Title | Playwright | Venue | Ref. |
|---|---|---|---|---|
| 1932 | The Fatal Alibi | Agatha Christie | Booth Theatre, Broadway | |
| 1947 | Galileo | Bertolt Brecht | Maxine Elliott Theatre, Broadway | |
| 1951–52 | Don Juan in Hell | George Bernard Shaw | Plymouth Theater, Broadway | |
| 1953 | John Brown's Body | Stephen Vincent Benét | New Century Theater, Broadway | |
| 1954–55 | The Caine Mutiny Court Martial | Herman Wouk | Plymouth Theater, Broadway | |
| 1956–57 | Major Barbara | George Bernard Shaw | Martin Beck Theatre, Broadway | |
| 1958 | The Party | Jane Arden | New Theatre, London | |

=== Producer ===
- 1955: 3 for Tonight (musical revue, with Harry Belafonte)

== In popular culture ==
Warner Brothers made three cartoons parodying Laughton's acting:

- Roman Legion-Hare (1955): parody of Laughton as Emperor Nero
- Good Noose (1962): parody of Laughton as a ship's Captain
- Shishkabugs (1962): parody of Laughton as a spoiled king

In Buccaneer Bunny (1948), Bugs Bunny does a brief impression of Laughton's Captain Bligh.
