= Hans Steinke =

German Actor and Wrestler

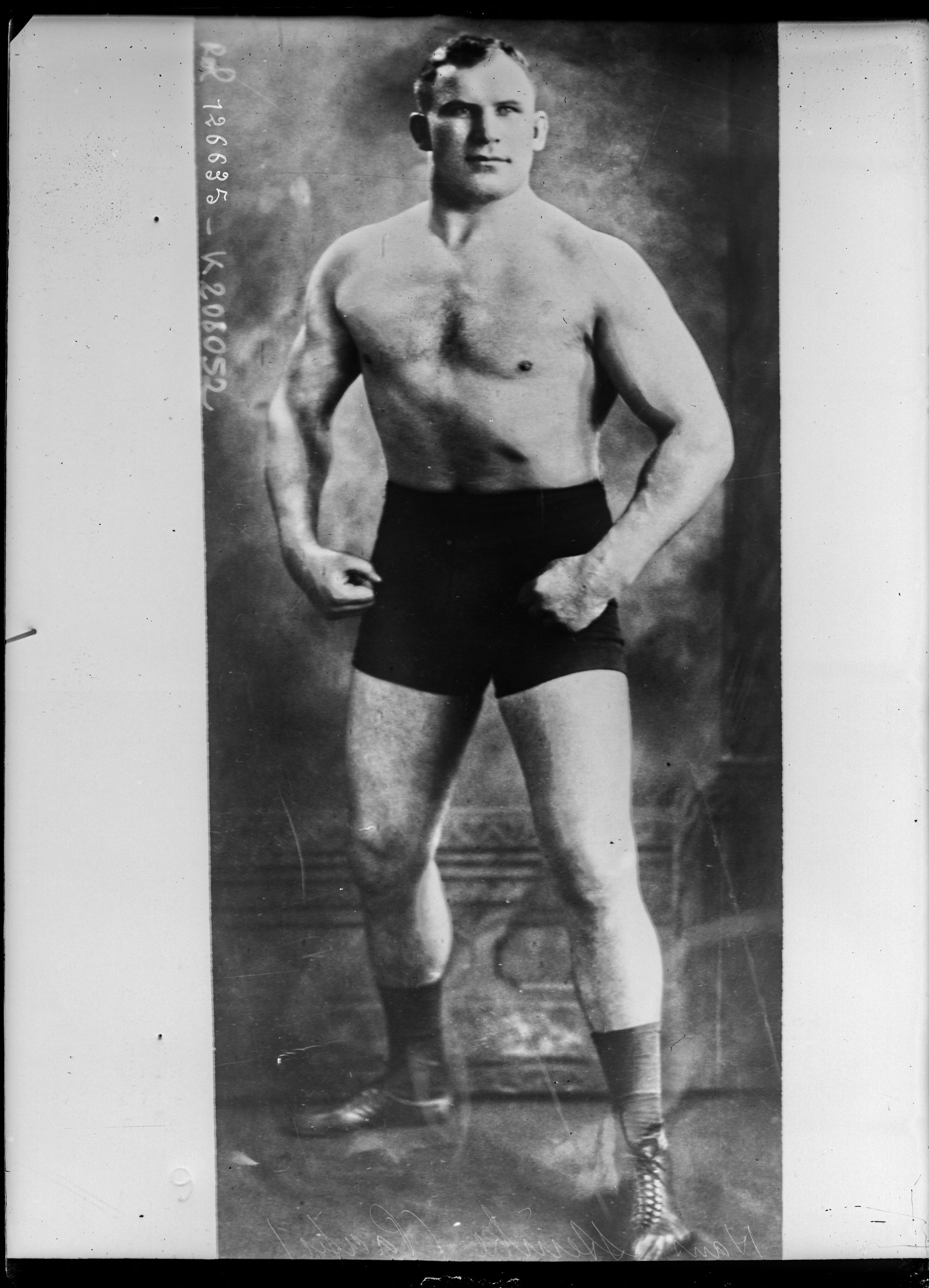
- Born: February 22, 1893; Berlin, German Empire
- Died: June 26, 1971 (aged 78); Chicago, Illinois, U.S.
- Occupations: Professional wrestler, actor

Hans Steinke (February 22, 1893 – June 26, 1971) was a German professional wrestler and actor. He appeared in the films Deception, Island of Lost Souls, People Will Talk, Nothing Sacred and The Buccaneer.

He died of lung cancer on June 26, 1971, in Chicago, Illinois at age 78.
