= Deception (1932 film) =

1932 film

- Directed by: Lewis Seiler
- Written by: Harold Tarshis
- Story by: Nat Pendleton
- Based on: Cauliflower Alley story idea by Nat Pendleton
- Produced by: Bryan Foy
- Starring: Leo Carrillo; Nat Pendleton; Thelma Todd
- Cinematography: Chester A. Lyons
- Edited by: William Austin
- Production company: Columbia Pictures
- Distributed by: Columbia Pictures
- Release date: November 4, 1932
- Running time: 67 minutes
- Country: United States
- Language: English

Deception is a 1932 American Pre-Code sports drama film directed by Lewis Seiler and starring Leo Carrillo, Nat Pendleton and Thelma Todd.

== Plot ==
A crooked fight promoter, Jim Hurley, dupes a naive former football player, Bucky O'Neill, into becoming an untrained wrestler in fixed bouts. When Hurley's girlfriend Lola Del Mont becomes romantically attracted to O'Neill, Hurley fixes his next match for wrestler Ivan Stanislaus to win. O'Neill plots his revenge during the next year as he secretly goes through rigorous wrestling training in another location. He returns disguised in a costume stolen from another wrestler, and Hurley orders him killed when he discovers his identity.

== Cast ==
- Leo Carrillo as Jim Hurley
- Nat Pendleton as Bucky O'Neill
- Thelma Todd as Lola Del Mont
- Barbara Weeks as Joan Allen
- Hans Steinke as Ivan Stanislaus
- Frank Sheridan as Leo
- Henry Armetta as Nick
- Dickie Moore as Dickie Allen
