= Charles Laughton =

British actor (1899–1962)

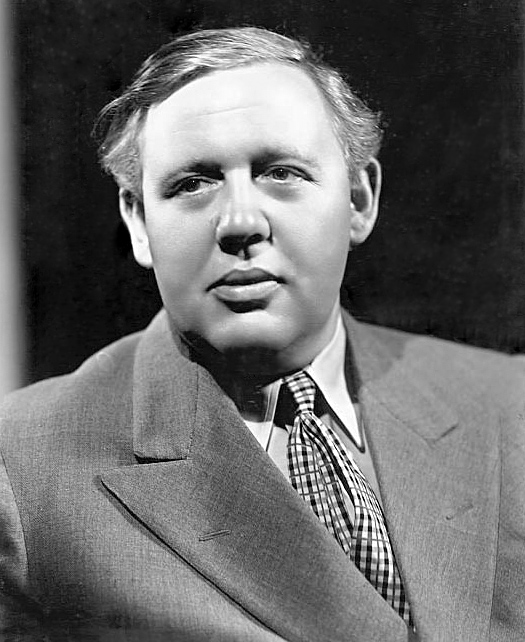
- Promotional portrait for The Barretts of Wimpole Street (1934)
- Born: 1 July 1899; Scarborough, North Riding of Yorkshire, England
- Died: 15 December 1962 (aged 63); Los Angeles, California, US
- Resting place: Forest Lawn Memorial Park, Hollywood Hills
- Citizenship: United Kingdom; United States (from 1950)
- Education: Royal Academy of Dramatic Art
- Occupations: Actor; theatre director
- Years active: 1926–1962
- Works: Full list
- Spouse: Elsa Lanchester (m. 1929)
- Awards: See below
- Military career
- Allegiance: United Kingdom
- Branch: British Army
- Units: 5th (Huntingdonshire) Battalion, Northamptonshire Regiment; 7th Battalion, Northamptonshire Regiment
- Conflicts: World War I

Charles Laughton (/ˈlɔːtən/; 1 July 1899 – 15 December 1962) was an English actor and director. Over his career he received an Academy Award and a Grammy Award as well as nominations for two BAFTAs and a Golden Globe. He earned a motion picture star on the Hollywood Walk of Fame in 1960.

Born in the North Riding of Yorkshire, Laughton was trained in London at the Royal Academy of Dramatic Art and first appeared professionally on the stage in 1926. He played a wide range of classical and modern roles both on West End and Off West End, making an impact in Shakespeare at the Old Vic. His acting career took him to Broadway and then Hollywood, where he portrayed everything from monsters and misfits to kings. He earned the Academy Award for Best Actor for his portrayal of the title character in the historical drama The Private Life of Henry VIII (1933).

Laughton was further Oscar-nominated for his roles as Captain William Bligh in the action adventure Mutiny on the Bounty (1935) and an irascible barrister in the courtroom drama Witness for the Prosecution (1957). Among his biggest film hits were The Barretts of Wimpole Street (1934), Ruggles of Red Gap (1935), Rembrandt (1936), Jamaica Inn (1939), The Hunchback of Notre Dame (1939), The Big Clock (1948), Young Bess (1953), Hobson's Choice (1954) and Spartacus (1960). His final film role was in Advise & Consent (1962).

He directed one film, the acclaimed thriller The Night of the Hunter (1955). In his later career, Laughton took up stage directing, notably in the dramas The Caine Mutiny Court-Martial, and Don Juan in Hell, in which he also starred.

== Life and career ==
=== Early years ===
Laughton was born on 1 July 1899 in Scarborough, North Riding of Yorkshire, the son of Robert Laughton (1869–1924) and Eliza (née Conlon; 1869–1953), Yorkshire hotel keepers. A blue plaque marks his birthplace. His mother was a devout Roman Catholic of Irish descent, and she sent him to briefly attend a local boys' school, Scarborough College, before sending him to Stonyhurst College, the pre-eminent English Jesuit school. Laughton served in World War I, during which he was gassed, serving first with the 2/1st Battalion of the Huntingdonshire Cyclist Battalion, and then with the 7th Battalion of the Northamptonshire Regiment.

He started work in the family hotel, though also participating in amateur theatrical productions in Scarborough. He was permitted by his family to become a drama student at RADA in 1925, where actor Claude Rains was one of his teachers. Laughton made his first professional appearance on 28 April 1926 at the Barnes Theatre, as Osip in the comedy The Government Inspector, in which he also appeared at London's Gaiety Theatre in May. He impressed audiences with his talent and had classical roles in two Chekov plays, The Cherry Orchard and The Three Sisters. Laughton played the lead role as Harry Hegan in the world premiere of Seán O'Casey's The Silver Tassie in 1928 in London. He played the title roles in Arnold Bennett's Mr Prohack (Elsa Lanchester was also in the cast) and as Samuel Pickwick in Mr. Pickwick at the Theatre Royal (1928–29) in London.

He played Tony Perelli in Edgar Wallace's On the Spot and William Marble in Payment Deferred. He took the last role across the Atlantic and made his United States debut on 24 September 1931, at the Lyceum Theatre. He returned to London for the 1933–34 Old Vic season and was engaged in four Shakespeare roles (as Macbeth, Henry VIII, Angelo in Measure for Measure and Prospero in The Tempest) and also as Lopakhin in The Cherry Orchard, Canon Chasuble in The Importance of Being Earnest, and Tattle in Love for Love. In 1936, he went to Paris and on 9 May appeared at the Comédie-Française as Sganarelle in the second act of Molière's Le Médecin malgré lui, the first English actor to appear at that theatre, where he performed the role in French and received an ovation.

Laughton commenced his film career in Great Britain while still acting on the London stage. He also accepted small roles in three short silent comedies starring his wife Elsa Lanchester, Daydreams, Blue Bottles, and The Tonic (all 1928), which had been specially written for her by H. G. Wells and were directed by Ivor Montagu. He made a brief appearance as a disgruntled diner in another silent film Piccadilly with Anna May Wong in 1929. He appeared with Lanchester again in Comets (1930), a film revue featuring assorted British variety acts, in which they sang a duet, "The Ballad of Frankie and Johnnie". He made two other early British talkies: Wolves with Dorothy Gish (1930) from a play set in a whaling camp in the frozen north, and Down River (1931), in which he played a drug-smuggling ship's captain.

His New York stage debut in 1931 immediately led to film offers, and Laughton's first Hollywood film, The Old Dark House (1932) with Boris Karloff, in which he played a bluff Yorkshire businessman marooned during a storm with other travelers in a creepy remote Welsh manor. He then played a demented submarine commander in Devil and the Deep with Tallulah Bankhead, Gary Cooper and Cary Grant, and followed this with his best-remembered film role of that year as Nero in Cecil B. DeMille's The Sign of the Cross. Laughton gave other memorable performances during that first Hollywood trip, repeating his stage role as a murderer in Payment Deferred, playing H. G. Wells' mad vivisectionist Dr. Moreau in Island of Lost Souls, and the meek raspberry-blowing clerk in the brief segment of If I Had A Million, directed by Ernst Lubitsch. He appeared in six Hollywood films in 1932. His association with director Alexander Korda began in 1933 with the hugely successful The Private Life of Henry VIII (loosely based on the life of King Henry VIII), for which Laughton won the Academy Award for Best Actor.

==== 1933–1943 ====
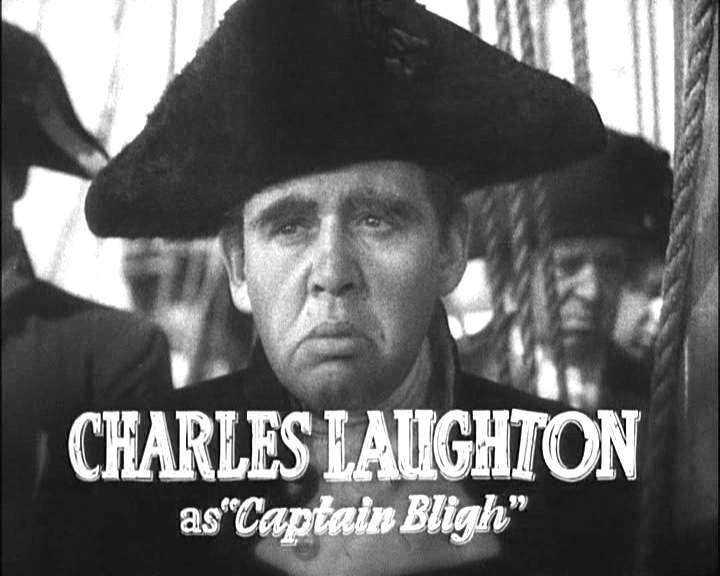
From the trailer for Mutiny on the Bounty (1935)

After his success in The Private Life of Henry VIII, Laughton soon abandoned the stage for films and returned to Hollywood, where his next film was White Woman (1933) in which he co-starred with Carole Lombard as a Cockney river trader in the Malayan jungle. Then came The Barretts of Wimpole Street (1934) as the malevolent father of Norma Shearer's character (although Laughton was only three years older than Shearer); Les Misérables (1935) as Inspector Javert; one of his most famous screen roles in Mutiny on the Bounty (1935) as Captain William Bligh, co-starring with Clark Gable as Fletcher Christian; and Ruggles of Red Gap (1935) as the very English butler transported to early 1900s America. He signed to play Micawber in David Copperfield (1934), but after a few days' shooting asked to be released from the role and was replaced by W. C. Fields.

Back in the UK, and again with Korda, he played the title role in Rembrandt (1936). In 1937, also for Korda, he starred in an ill-fated film version of the classic novel, I, Claudius, by Robert Graves, which was abandoned during filming owing to the injuries suffered by co-star Merle Oberon in a car crash. After I, Claudius, he and the expatriate German film producer Erich Pommer founded the production company Mayflower Pictures in the UK, which produced three films starring Laughton: Vessel of Wrath (US title The Beachcomber) (1938), based on a story by W. Somerset Maugham, in which his wife, Elsa Lanchester, co-starred; St. Martin's Lane (US title Sidewalks of London), about London street entertainers, which featured Vivien Leigh and Rex Harrison; and Jamaica Inn, with Maureen O'Hara and Robert Newton, about Cornish shipwreckers, based on Daphne du Maurier's novel (and the last film Alfred Hitchcock directed in Britain), before moving to Hollywood in the late 1930s.

The films produced were not commercially successful enough, and the company was rescued from bankruptcy only when RKO Pictures offered Laughton the title role (Quasimodo) in The Hunchback of Notre Dame (1939), with Jamaica Inn co-star O'Hara. Laughton and Pommer had plans to make further films, but the outbreak of World War II, which implied the loss of many foreign markets, meant the end of the company. Laughton's early success in The Private Life of Henry VIII established him as one of the leading interpreters of the costume and historical drama roles for which he is best remembered (Nero, Henry VIII, Mr. Barrett, Inspector Javert, Captain Bligh, Rembrandt, Quasimodo, and others); he was also type-cast as arrogant, unscrupulous characters.

He largely moved away from historical roles when he played an Italian vineyard owner in California in They Knew What They Wanted (1940); a South Seas patriarch in The Tuttles of Tahiti (1942); an impoverished composer-pianist in Tales of Manhattan (1942); and a US admiral during World War II in Stand By for Action (1942). He played a Victorian butler in Forever and a Day (1943) and an Australian bar-owner in The Man from Down Under (1943). Simon Callow's 1987 biography quotes a number of contemporary reviews of Laughton's performances in these films. James Agate, reviewing Forever and a Day, wrote: "Is there no-one at RKO to tell Charles Laughton when he is being plain bad?" On the other hand, Bosley Crowther of The New York Times declared that Forever and a Day boasted "superb performances".

C. A. Lejeune, wrote Callow, was "shocked" by the poor quality of Laughton's work of that period: "One of the most painful screen phenomena of latter years", she wrote in The Observer, "has been the decline and fall of Charles Laughton." On the other hand, David Shipman, in his book The Great Movie Stars: The Golden Years, said "Laughton was a total actor. His range was wide".

==== 1943–1962 ====
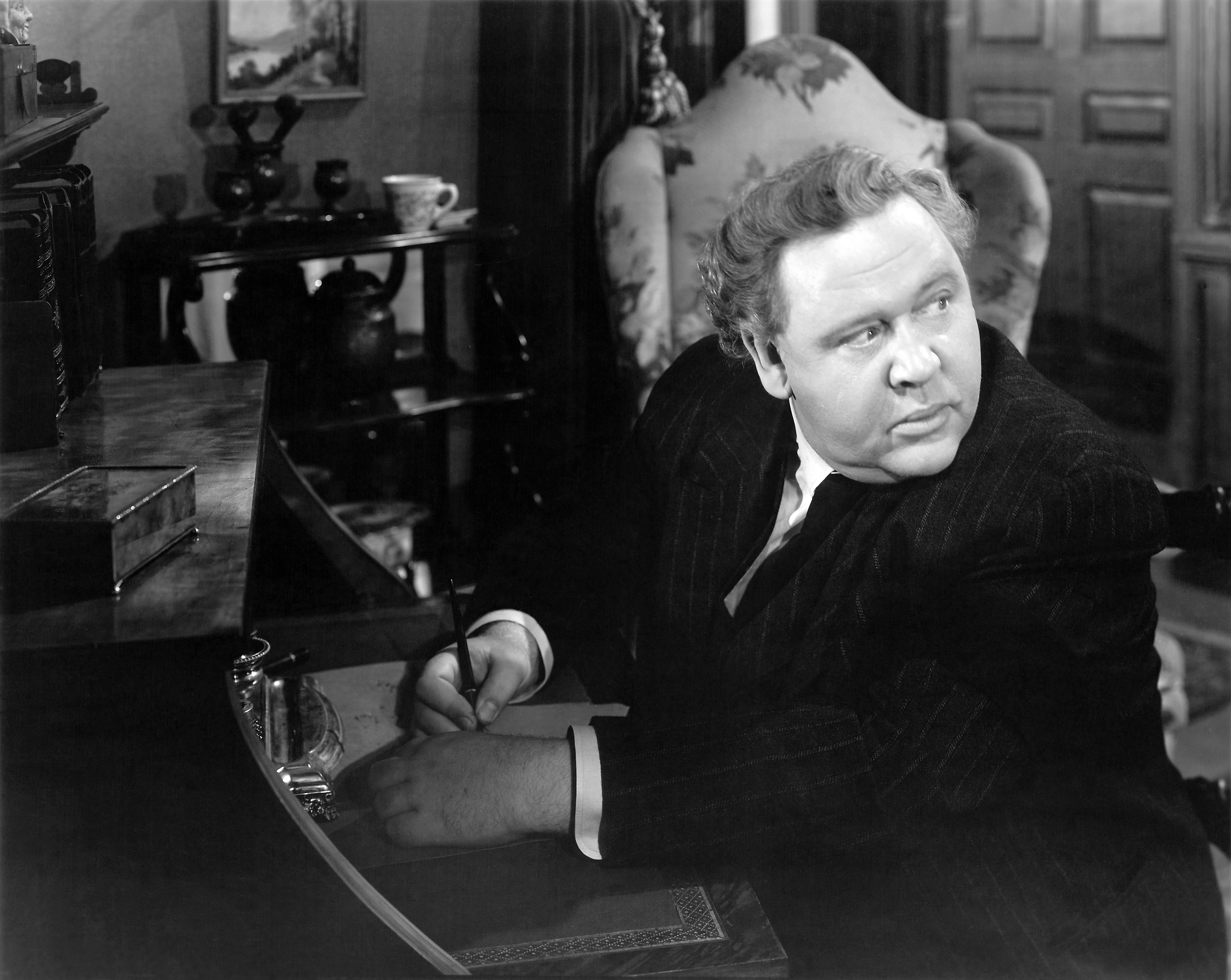
Laughton in The Suspect (1944)

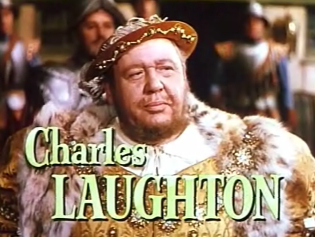
As Henry VIII in Young Bess (1953)

Laughton played a cowardly schoolmaster in occupied France in This Land Is Mine (1943), by Jean Renoir, in which he engaged himself most actively; in fact, while Renoir was still working on an early script, Laughton would talk about Alphonse Daudet's story "The Last Lesson", which suggested to Renoir a relevant scene for the film. Laughton played a henpecked husband who eventually murders his wife in The Suspect (1944), directed by Robert Siodmak, who would become a good friend.. He starred in The Canterville Ghost, based on the Oscar Wilde story in 1944.

Laughton appeared in two comedies with Deanna Durbin, It Started with Eve (1941) and Because of Him (1946). He portrayed a bloodthirsty pirate in Captain Kidd (1945) and a malevolent judge in Alfred Hitchcock's The Paradine Case (1947). Laughton played a megalomaniac press tycoon in The Big Clock (1948). He had supporting roles as a Nazi in pre-war Paris in Arch of Triumph (1948), as a bishop in The Girl from Manhattan (1948), as a seedy go-between in The Bribe (1949), and as a kindly widower in The Blue Veil (1951). He played a Bible-reading pastor in the multi-story A Miracle Can Happen (1947), but his piece wound up being cut and replaced with another featuring Dorothy Lamour, and in this form the film was retitled as On Our Merry Way. However, an original print of A Miracle Can Happen was sent abroad for dubbing before the Laughton sequence was deleted, and in this form it was shown in Spain as Una Encuesta Llamada Milagro.

Laughton made his first colour film in Paris as Inspector Maigret in The Man on the Eiffel Tower (1949) and, wrote the Monthly Film Bulletin, "appeared to overact" alongside Boris Karloff as a mad French nobleman in a version of Robert Louis Stevenson's The Strange Door in 1951. He played a tramp in O. Henry's Full House (1952). He became the pirate Captain Kidd again, this time for comic effect, in Abbott and Costello Meet Captain Kidd (1952). Laughton made a guest appearance on the Colgate Comedy Hour (featuring Abbott and Costello), in which he delivered the Gettysburg Address. In 1953 he played Herod Antipas in Salome, and he reprised his role as Henry VIII in Young Bess, a 1953 drama about Henry's children.

He returned to Britain to star in Hobson's Choice (1954), directed by David Lean. Laughton received Academy Award and Golden Globe nominations for his role in Witness for the Prosecution (1957). He played a British admiral in Under Ten Flags (1960) and worked with Laurence Olivier in Spartacus (1960). His final film was Advise & Consent (1962), for which he received favourable comments for his performance as a Southern US Senator (for which accent he studied recordings of Mississippi Senator John C. Stennis).

==== The Night of the Hunter and other projects ====
In 1955, Laughton directed The Night of the Hunter, starring Robert Mitchum, Shelley Winters and Lillian Gish, and produced by his friend Paul Gregory. The film is cited as one of the best of the 1950s, and was selected by the United States National Film Registry for preservation in the Library of Congress. At the time of its original release it was a critical and box-office failure, and Laughton never directed again. The documentary Charles Laughton Directs The Night of the Hunter by Robert Gitt (2002) features preserved rushes and outtakes with Laughton's audible off-camera direction.

Laughton had intended to follow up The Night of the Hunter with an adaptation of Norman Mailer's The Naked and the Dead. Terry and Dennis Sanders were hired as writers, and press releases announced that Robert Mitchum was to star and that Walter Schumann would compose the score. Following the box-office failure of The Night of the Hunter, Laughton was replaced by Raoul Walsh as director on the film and recruited an uncredited writer to rewrite the Sanders brothers' screenplay.

Laughton also developed a remake of the 1927 silent film White Gold.

=== Theatre ===
Laughton made his London stage debut in Gogol's The Government Inspector (1926). He appeared in many West End plays in the following few years and his earliest successes on the stage were as Hercule Poirot in Alibi (1928); he was the first actor to portray the Belgian detective in this stage adaptation of The Murder of Roger Ackroyd, and as William Marble in Payment Deferred, making his Lyceum Theatre (New York) debut in 1931.

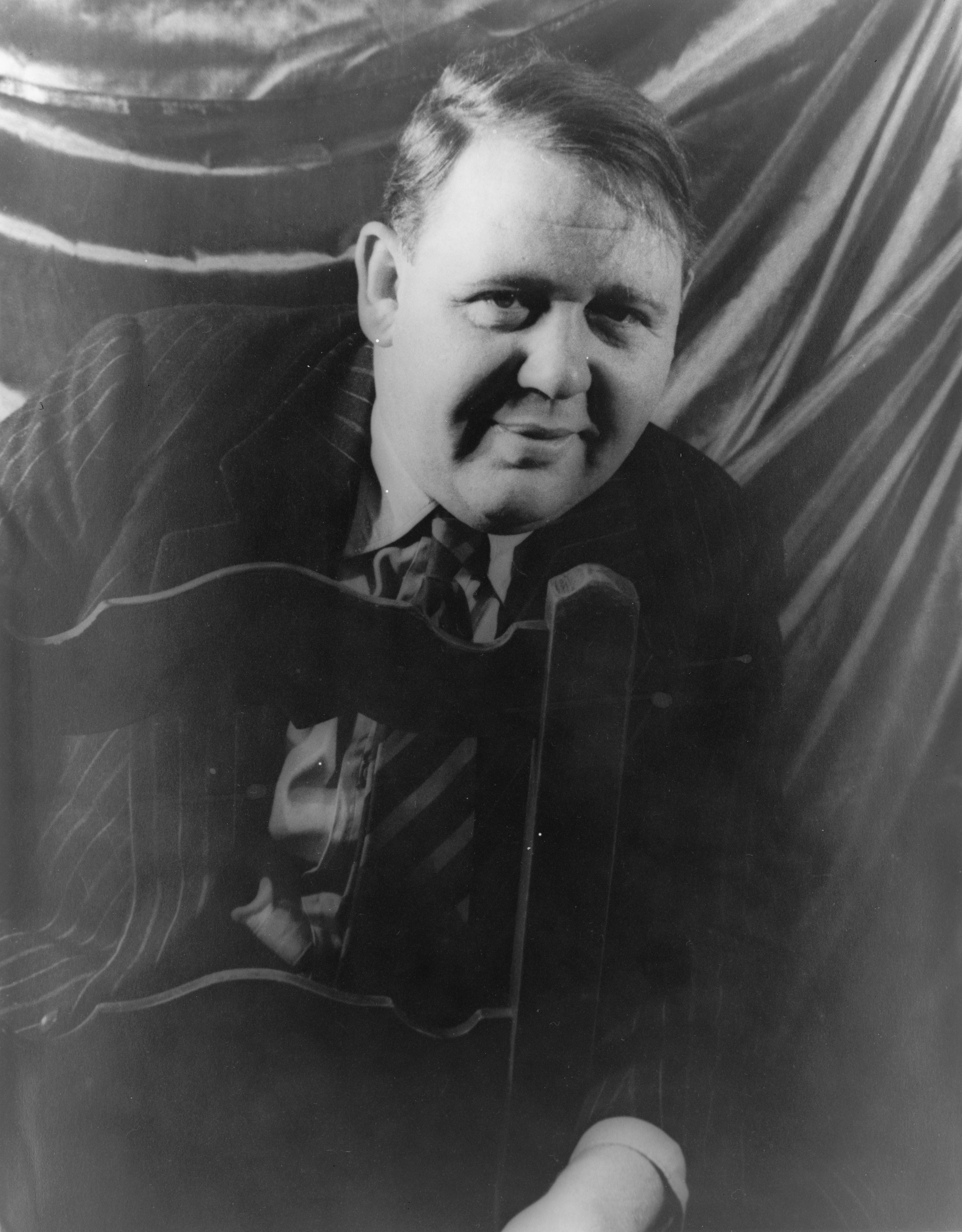
Charles Laughton in 1940

In 1926, he played the role of the criminal Ficsur in the original London production of Ferenc Molnár's Liliom (The play became a musical in 1945 by Rodgers and Hammerstein as Carousel, where Ficsur became Jigger Craigin, but Laughton never appeared in the musical version). While Laughton is most remembered for his film career, he continued to work in the theatre, as when, after the success of The Private Life of Henry VIII he appeared at the Old Vic Theatre in 1933 as Macbeth, Lopakin in The Cherry Orchard, Prospero in The Tempest and Angelo in Measure for Measure. In the US, Laughton worked with Bertolt Brecht on a new English version of Brecht's play Galileo. Laughton played the title role at the play's premiere in Los Angeles on 30 July 1947 and later that year in New York. This staging was directed by Joseph Losey. The processes by which Laughton painstakingly, over many weeks, created his Galileo—and incidentally, edited and translated the play along with Brecht—are detailed in an essay by Brecht, "Building Up A Part: Laughton's Galileo."

Laughton had one of his most notable successes in the theatre by directing and playing the Devil in Don Juan in Hell beginning in 1950. The piece is actually the third act sequence from George Bernard Shaw's play Man and Superman, frequently cut from productions to reduce its playing time, consisting of a philosophical debate between Don Juan and the Devil with contributions from Doña Ana and the statue of Ana's father. Laughton conceived the piece as a staged reading and cast Charles Boyer, Cedric Hardwicke and Agnes Moorehead (billed as "The First Drama Quartette") in the other roles. Boyer won a special Tony Award for his performance.

He directed several plays on Broadway, mostly under the production of his friend and Broadway producer Paul Gregory. His most notable box-office success as a director came in 1954, with The Caine Mutiny Court-Martial, a full-length stage dramatisation by Herman Wouk of the court-martial scene in Wouk's novel The Caine Mutiny. The play, starring Henry Fonda as defence attorney Barney Greenwald, opened the same year as the film starring Humphrey Bogart as Captain Queeg and José Ferrer as Greenwald based on the original novel, but did not affect that film's box-office performance. Laughton also directed a staged reading in 1953 of Stephen Vincent Benét's John Brown's Body, a full-length poem about the American Civil War and its aftermath. The production starred Tyrone Power, Raymond Massey (re-creating his film characterisations of Abraham Lincoln and John Brown), and Judith Anderson. Laughton did not appear himself in either production, but John Brown's Body was recorded complete by Columbia Masterworks. He directed and starred in George Bernard Shaw's, Major Barbara which ran on Broadway from approximately 1 November 1956, to 18 May 1957. Others in the cast were Glynis Johns, Burgess Meredith, Cornelia Otis Skinner, and Eli Wallach.

Laughton returned to the London stage in May 1958 to direct and star in Jane Arden's The Party at the New Theatre which also had Elsa Lanchester and Albert Finney in the cast. He made his final appearances on stage as Nick Bottom in A Midsummer Night's Dream, and as King Lear at the Shakespeare Memorial Theatre in 1959, although failing health resulted in both performances being disappointing, according to some British critics. His performance as King Lear was lambasted by critics, and Kenneth Tynan wrote that Laughton's Nick Bottom "... behaves in a manner that has nothing to do with acting, although it perfectly hits off the demeanor of a rapscallion uncle dressed up to entertain the children at a Christmas party". Although he did not appear in any later plays, Laughton toured the US with staged readings, including a successful appearance on the Stanford University campus in 1960.

=== Recordings ===
Laughton's voice, equally capable of a penetrating, theatre-filling shout and a soft, velvety tone, first appeared on 78-rpm records with the release of five British Regal Zonophone 10-inch discs entitled Voice of the Stars issued annually from 1934 to 1938. These featured short soundtrack snippets from the year's top films. He is heard on all five records in, respectively, The Private Life of Henry VIII, The Barretts of Wimpole Street, Mutiny on the Bounty, I, Claudius (curiously, since this film was unfinished and thus never released), and Vessel of Wrath. In 1937 he recorded Lincoln's Gettysburg Address on a 10-inch Columbia 78, having made a strong impression with it in Ruggles of Red Gap.

He made several other spoken-word recordings, one of his most famous being his one-man album of Charles Dickens's Mr. Pickwick's Christmas, a twenty-minute version of the Christmas chapter from Dickens's The Pickwick Papers. It was first released by American Decca in 1944 as a four-record 78-rpm set, but was afterward transferred to LP. It frequently appeared on LP with a companion piece, Decca's 1941 adaptation of Dickens's A Christmas Carol, starring Ronald Colman as Scrooge. Both stories were released together on a Deutsche Grammophon CD for Christmas 2005.

In 1943, Laughton recorded a reading of the Nativity story from St. Luke's Gospel, and this was released in 1995 on CD on a Nimbus Records collection entitled Prima Voce: The Spirit of Christmas Past. A Brunswick/American Decca LP entitled Readings from the Bible featured Laughton reading Garden of Eden, The Fiery Furnace, Noah's Ark, and David and Goliath. It was released in 1958. Laughton had previously included several Bible readings when he played the title role in the film Rembrandt. Laughton also narrated the story on the soundtrack album of the film that he directed, Night of the Hunter, accompanied by the film's score. This album has also been released on CD. Also, and derived from the film they made together, a complete radio show (18 June 1945) of The Canterville Ghost was broadcast which featured Laughton and Margaret O'Brien. It has been issued on a Pelican LP.

A two-LP Capitol Records album was released in 1962, the year of Laughton's death, entitled The Story Teller: A Session with Charles Laughton. Taken from Laughton's one-man stage shows, it compiles dramatic readings from several sources. Three of the excerpts are broadcast annually on a Minnesota Public Radio Thanksgiving program entitled Giving Thanks. The Story Teller won a Grammy in 1962 for Best Spoken Word Recording. Although the album has yet to be released on compact disc, it can now be heard in its entirety online.

=== Television ===
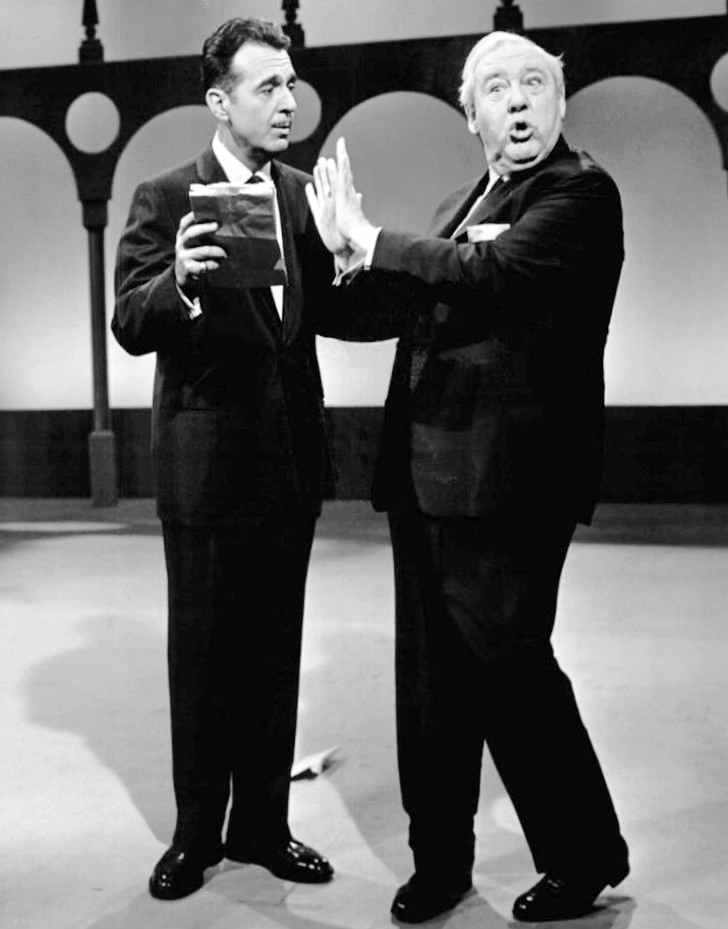
With Tennessee Ernie Ford in a guest appearance on The Ford Show (1961)

Laughton was the fill-in host on 9 September 1956, when Elvis Presley made his first of three appearances on CBS's The Ed Sullivan Show, which garnered 60.7 million viewers (Ed Sullivan was recuperating from a car accident). That same year, Laughton hosted the first of two programmes devoted to classical music entitled "Festival of Music", and telecast on the NBC television anthology series Producers' Showcase. One of his last performances was on Checkmate, in which he played a missionary recently returned from China. He threw himself into the role, travelling to China for several months to better understand his character.

== Personal life ==
=== Marriage ===
In 1927, Laughton began a relationship with Elsa Lanchester, at the time a castmate in a stage play. The two were married in 1929, became US citizens in 1950, and remained together until Laughton's death. Over the years, they appeared together in several films, including Rembrandt (1936), Tales of Manhattan (1942), The Vessel of Wrath (1938), and The Big Clock (1948). Lanchester portrayed Anne of Cleves, Henry VIII's fourth wife, opposite Laughton in The Private Life of Henry VIII. They both received Academy Award nominations for their performances in Witness for the Prosecution (1957)—Laughton for Best Actor, and Lanchester for Best Supporting Actress—but neither won.

=== Sexuality ===
Laughton's bisexuality was corroborated by several of his contemporaries and is generally accepted by Hollywood historians. Hollywood procurer and prostitute Scotty Bowers alleged in his memoir Full Service that Laughton was in love with Tyrone Power and that his sex life was exclusively homosexual. Actress Maureen O'Hara, a friend and co-star of Laughton, disputed the contention that his sexuality was the reason Laughton and Lanchester did not have children, saying Laughton told her he had wanted children but that it had not been possible because of a botched abortion that Lanchester had early in her career as a burlesque performer. In her autobiography, Lanchester acknowledged two abortions in her youth—one of the pregnancies purportedly by Laughton—but did not mention infertility. According to her biographer, Charles Higham, the reason she did not have children was that she did not want any.

=== Interests ===
Laughton owned an estate on the bluffs above Pacific Coast Highway at 14954 Corona Del Mar in Pacific Palisades. The property suffered a landslide in 1944, referenced by Bertolt Brecht in his poem "Garden in Progress".

== Death and legacy ==
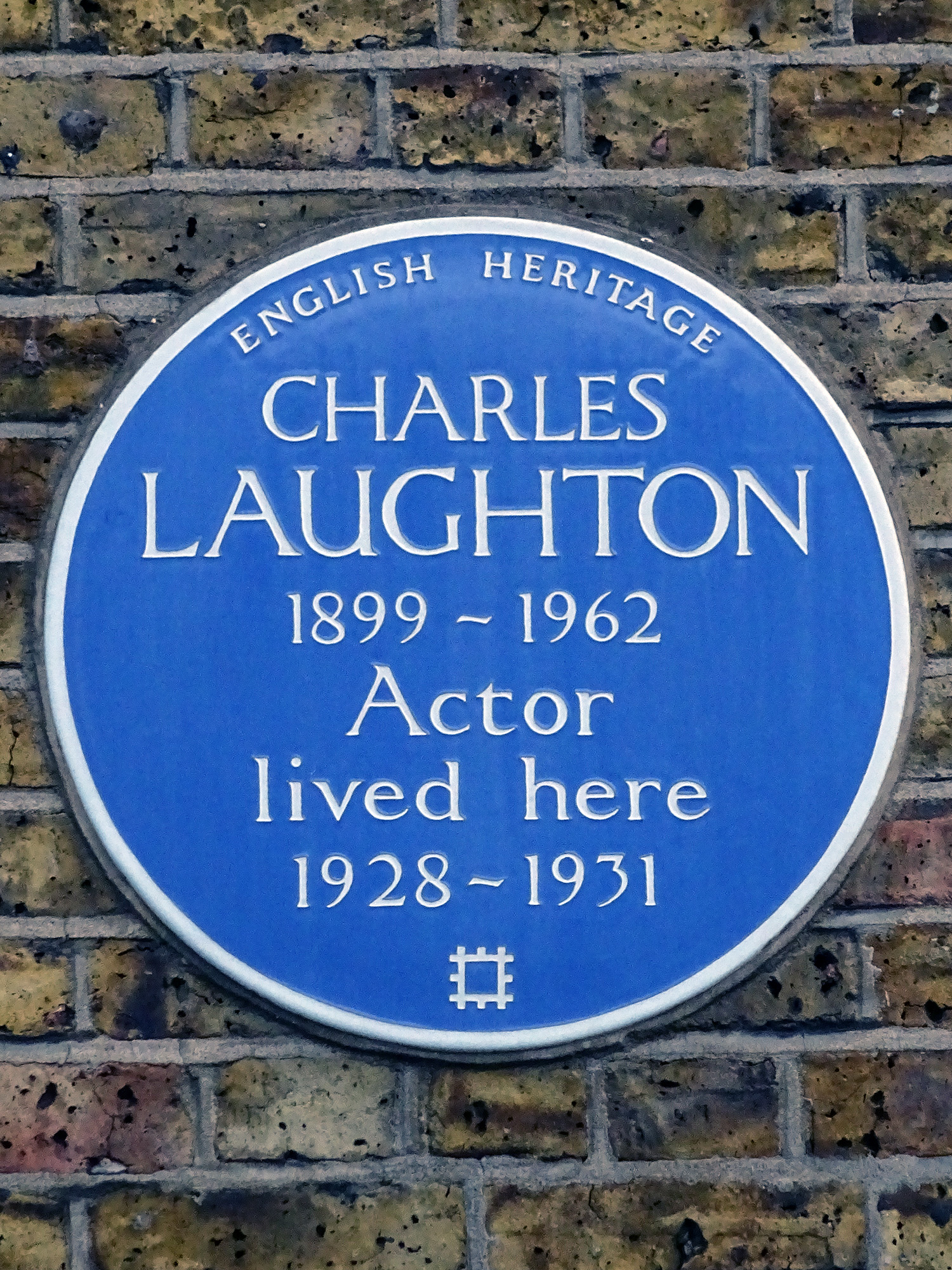
English Heritage blue plaque erected in 1992 at 15 Percy Street, London W1T 1DS, England, commemorating Charles Laughton

Laughton checked in to Cedars of Lebanon Hospital in July 1962 with what was described as a ruptured disc. He had surgery for the collapse of a vertebra and it was found that the vertebra had fractured due to a spinal metastasis. He left the hospital at the end of November. He was in a coma for some time and died at home on 15 December 1962 from renal cancer and bladder cancer. His ashes were inurned at Forest Lawn Memorial Park (Hollywood Hills).

English actor Daniel Day-Lewis cited Laughton as one of his inspirations, saying: "He was probably the greatest film actor who came from that period of time. He had something quite remarkable. His generosity as an actor; he fed himself into that work. As an actor, you cannot take your eyes off him."

== Awards and honours ==
Organizations	Year	Category	Work	Result	Ref.
Academy Awards	1933	Best Actor	The Private Life of Henry VIII	Won	
Academy Awards	1935	Best Actor	Mutiny on the Bounty	Nominated	
Academy Awards	1957	Best Actor	Witness for the Prosecution	Nominated	
BAFTA Awards	1957	Best Foreign Actor	Witness for the Prosecution	Nominated	
BAFTA Awards	1963	Best Foreign Actor	Advise & Consent	Nominated	
Golden Globe Awards	1957	Best Actor in a Motion Picture – Drama	Witness for the Prosecution	Nominated	
Grammy Awards	1963	Best Spoken Word Recording	The Story-Teller ... A Session with Charles Laughton	Won	
National Board of Review	1938	Best Acting	The Beachcomber	Won	
New York Film Critics' Circle	1935	Best Actor	Mutiny on the Bounty / Ruggles of Red Gap	Won	

For his contributions to the motion picture industry, Laughton has a star on the Hollywood Walk of Fame, at 7021 Hollywood Blvd.

== See also ==
- List of Academy Award winners and nominees from Great Britain
- List of atheists in film, radio, television and theatre
- List of actors with Academy Award nominations
- List of British actors
- List of oldest and youngest Academy Award winners and nominees — Youngest winners for Best Lead Actor
- List of LGBTQ Academy Award winners and nominees — Best Lead Actor nominees alleged to be LGBTQ
