= 1932 in science fiction =

The year 1932 was marked, in science fiction, by the following events.

== Births and deaths ==
=== Births ===
- September 28 : Michael Coney, British writer (died in 2005).
- November 7 : Vladimir Volkoff, French writer (died in 2005).
- November 8 : Ben Bova, American writer (died in 2020).
- August 15 : Robert Forward, American writer (died in 2002).

== Literary releases ==
=== Novels ===
- Cat Country, by Lao She.
- Brave New World, by Aldous Huxley.

=== Short stories ===
- The Cities of Ardathia, by George Henry Weiss.

== Movies ==
- Island of Lost Souls, by Erle C. Kenton.

== Awards ==
The main science-fiction Awards known at the present time did not exist at this time.

== See also ==
- 1932 in science
