= Ruggles of Red Gap =

1935 film by Leo McCarey

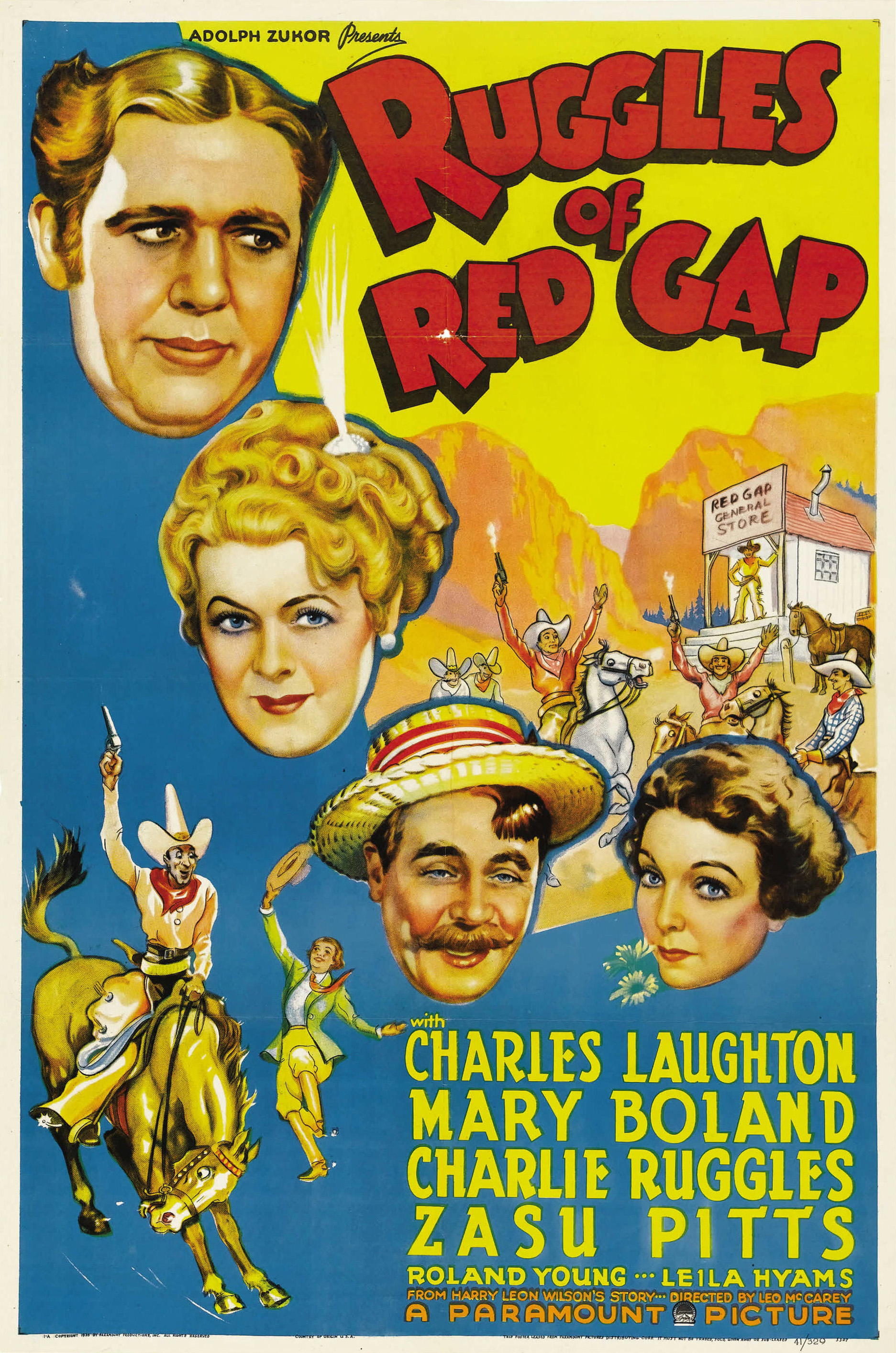
- Theatrical release poster
- Directed by: Leo McCarey
- Screenplay by: Walter DeLeon; Harlan Thompson
- Story by: Humphrey Pearson
- Based on: Ruggles of Red Gap by Harry Leon Wilson
- Produced by: Arthur Hornblow Jr.
- Starring: Charles Laughton; Mary Boland; Charlie Ruggles; ZaSu Pitts; Roland Young; Leila Hyams
- Cinematography: Alfred Gilks
- Edited by: Edward Dmytryk
- Distributed by: Paramount Pictures
- Release date: March 8, 1935
- Running time: 90 minutes
- Country: United States
- Language: English

Ruggles of Red Gap is a 1935 American comedy film directed by Leo McCarey and starring: Charles Laughton, Mary Boland, Charlie Ruggles and ZaSu Pitts and featuring Roland Young and Leila Hyams. It was based on the best-selling 1915 novel by Harry Leon Wilson, adapted by Humphrey Pearson, with a screenplay by Walter DeLeon and Harlan Thompson.

The story concerns a British gentleman's gentleman who discovers a "new birth of freedom" in a small Western American town in the early 20th century.

Ruggles of Red Gap was "an immense commercial hit" and confirmed Leo McCarey's stature as Paramount's outstanding comedy filmmaker of his day.

== Plot ==
Marmaduke Ruggles is valet to the Earl of Burnstead in 1908. The Earl tells Ruggles that he has gambled him away in a drunken game of poker, and he is to report to his new masters – nouveau riche American millionaires Egbert and Effie Floud – immediately. Ruggles bemoans the idea of being relegated to "the land of slavery," but he takes his new occupation in stride.

Egbert slips away from Effie and takes Ruggles to a Parisian café. He explains to the valet that, in America, everyone is equal, and Ruggles should behave like a friend rather than a deferential servant. Ruggles is dismissive, but after a night of drinking with Egbert and his wild friend Jeff Tuttle, his "stiff upper lip" falls away as he follows the examples of Egbert and Tuttle. The three embark on an alcohol-fueled trip across Paris which ends with them returning to the Floud's hotel room. The next day Ruggles is embarrassed, and he apologizes to Effie for his behavior.

The Flouds return to the town of Red Gap in America. Ruggles meets the extended family of the Flouds, including "Ma" Pettingill, Effie's mother, and Charles Belknap-Jackson, a snooty relative of Effie's who treats Ruggles with disdain. A party held to receive the Flouds inadvertently turns into a warm welcome for Ruggles after Ruggles is mistaken for a wealthy retired Englishman. Ruggles also meets Mrs. Judson, a widowed housewife and cook. When Belknap-Jackson chastises Ruggles for dancing at the party with Mrs. Judson, Ruggles kicks him in the behind. He is almost fired, but his job is saved as a newspaper article describing Ruggles as an "honored houseguest" of the Flouds makes him a local celebrity.

Ruggles becomes a fixture in society, as Effie and Belknap-Jackson use his status to advance socially. He begins a relationship with Mrs. Judson and reads about the history of the United States. One day, after the rest of the family have left on a trip, Belknap-Jackson fires Ruggles. While waiting for the train, Ruggles wanders into the local saloon where he finds Mrs. Judson, Egbert, and Ma. Egbert laughs off Belknap-Jackson's actions, but Ruggles explains that he wants to live as a free and independent person and, because of that, he won't return to work for the Flouds. Egbert compares this to "what Lincoln said at Gettysburg", but neither he, nor any of the other people in the saloon can remember the words. As they each try to remind themselves of what it says, Ruggles stands up and recites the entire Gettysburg Address from memory.

Ruggles decides to open a restaurant in Red Gap. As he is preparing the restaurant space with Mrs. Judson, Effie arrives with troubling news: the Earl of Burnstead is visiting Red Gap to buy Ruggles back from the Flouds. Ruggles reluctantly agrees to return to the Flouds, but Mrs. Judson is disgusted by his deference to his former employers. On the night of a party in the Earl's honor, Ruggles goes missing. Egbert convinces the Earl to slip out to another, more raucous party hosted by the beautiful young Nell Kenner, to whom the Earl instantly takes an interest. They eventually return to the Floud house, just as Ruggles returns and informs the Earl of his decision to "be someone" and live independently, on his own terms.

The restaurant opening proves to be a great success. All the friends he has made on his journey from England to America attend its gala opening. Belknap-Jackson also attends and insults Ruggles and his cooking to his face, so Ruggles throws him out. Ruggles retreats to the kitchen, sure that he has ruined his social standing in Red Gap. Outside, the diners begin to sing "For He's a Jolly Good Fellow," but Ruggles doesn't realize they are singing for him. Egbert pulls him out of the kitchen, saying: "Why, you old plate of soup, they're singing it for you!" As the song crescendos, Egbert pushes Ruggles back into the kitchen so that he can celebrate privately with Mrs. Judson.

== Cast ==
- Charles Laughton as Marmaduke Ruggles
- Mary Boland as Effie Floud
- Charlie Ruggles as Egbert Floud
- ZaSu Pitts as Mrs. Judson
- Roland Young as Earl of Burnstead
- Leila Hyams as Nell Kenner
- Maude Eburne as "Ma" Pettingill
- Lucien Littlefield as Charles Belknap-Jackson
- Leota Lorraine as Mrs. Belknap-Jackson
- James Burke as Jeff Tuttle
- Dell Henderson as Sam
- Clarence Wilson as Jake Henshaw
- Heinie Conklin as Waiter (uncredited)
- Willie Fung as Willie (uncredited)

== Production ==
Based on the best-selling 1915 novel by Harry Leon Wilson, Ruggles of Red Gap was adapted to screen by Humphery Pearson, with a screenplay by Walter DeLeon and Harlan Thompson. The story had twice been adapted to film in the silent era: in 1918 and again in 1923.

Regarded as the most outstanding comedy director with Paramount at the time, studio executives provided Leo McCarey with top quality talent for the picture. Indeed, the "A" film or high production period of McCarey's career can be dated from Ruggles of Red Gap."

According to film historian Wes D. Gehring, McCarey cast Charles Laughton in the lead role when he detected a "comedic flourish" in the actor's Academy Award-winning performance as the English king, in The Private Life of Henry VIII (1933).

The film was shot on locations in Humboldt County, California.

== Reception ==
Both director Leo McCarey and actor Charles Laughton received overwhelming critical accolades for their work in Ruggles of Red Gap. Film historian Wes D. Gehring reports that "The press was so good on Ruggles that references to the picture began to turn up in reviews of other pictures."

The Hollywood Reporter titled their effusive review of the picture "McCarey, Laughton and Ruggles Tops." Richard Watts, Jr. at the New York Herald Tribune described Laughton's Ruggles as "the most sympathetic hero since Rip Van Winkle, and Laughton's acting was favorably compared to that of Charlie Chaplin.

The New York Tribune's Howard Barnes wrote: "Leo McCarey, who may be remembered gratefully for Ruggles of Red Gap, has produced and directed the film with courage, power and imagination." So consistently positive were the reviews that Paramount simply issued a statement directing the public to refer to press reports concerning the movie, without further comment.

=== Box office ===
It was one of the most popular films at the British box office in 1935.

== Retrospective appraisal ==
Describing the film as "an odd little masterpiece," MoMA film curator Charles Silver places Ruggles of Red Gap within the realm of screwball produced during the 1930s and praises "McCarey's genius for directing actors and his exquisite sense of timing." Silver adds that "the film's dramatic high point is Laughton's barroom recitation of the Gettysburg Address and its assertion of "a new birth of freedom."

Leland Poague declares that "Ruggles is arguably McCarey's most personal, most social, and most idealistic film" in his oeuvre.

== Theme ==
McCarey locates the film's central thematic element in the natural discord between "personal and social imperatives" and the struggle to bring these into balance. Ruggles of Red Gap demonstrates the reciprocity required to allow the flourishing of each in a democratic republic. "In Ruggles, McCarey explores the relationship between personality and society and does so in an idealistic literary context which asserts the essential (and necessary) identity of personal and social imperatives."

=== Gettysburg address scene ===
Film historian Wes D. Gehring describes Ruggles of Red Gap as "the story of a proper British butler, lost in a poker game to a nouveau riche American, evolves into a free man."

The origins of the film sequence arose from an event in McCarey's own life. During an alcohol-fueled social gathering, the topic of the Gettysburg Address came up; everyone agreed as to its importance, but no one present could recite a word of the iconic document.

The film fully takes shape as a "populist classic" with the sequence in which Laughton, the former body servant to a wealthy English gentleman, recites the Gettysburg Address, a speech delivered by Abraham Lincoln in 1863, announcing a "new birth of freedom" for the people of the American republic.

Ruggles, an immigrant to the United States, delivers the speech in the Silver Dollar saloon occupied entirely by "All-American Western types." The moving content of the address comes as a revelation and a liberation to most of the denizens of Red Gap.

== Awards and nominations ==
Charles Laughton won the New York Film Critics' Circle Awards for Ruggles of Red Gap (with Mutiny on the Bounty) in 1935. The National Board of Review named the film the ninth best of 1935. That year, Laughton's other two films, Les Misérables and Mutiny on the Bounty, were sixth and eighth on the list, respectively. The film was nominated for the Oscar for Best Picture and competed against two other Laughton films that were also nominated: Mutiny on the Bounty (which won the award) and Les Misérables.

In 2014, the film was deemed "culturally, historically, or aesthetically significant" by the Library of Congress and selected for preservation in the National Film Registry.

== Other adaptations ==
Harry Leon Wilson's novel Ruggles of Red Gap was adapted for the Broadway stage as a musical in 1915, the same year that it was published. It was first made into a silent film in 1918 and again in 1923 (the latter with Edward Everett Horton as Ruggles).

A musical adaptation called Fancy Pants starring Bob Hope and Lucille Ball was released in 1950.

Ruggles of Red Gap was adapted as a radio play several times. First on the July 10, 1939 episode of Lux Radio Theater; second on the December 17, 1945 episode of The Screen Guild Theater; and third on the June 8, 1946 episode of Academy Award Theater. All of these adaptations found Charles Laughton and Charlie Ruggles reprising their film parts.

A television musical version was produced on Producers' Showcase in 1957, starring Michael Redgrave, Peter Lawford, David Wayne and Jane Powell. The songs were created by Jule Styne and Leo Robin.

== Sources ==
- Gehring, Wes D. 2005. Leo McCarey: From Marx to McCarthy. The Scarecrow Press. Lantham, Maryland, Toronto, Oxford. ISBN 0-8108-5263-2
- Hooper, Gary and Poague, Leland. 1980. Leo McCarey Filmography in The Hollywood Professionals: Wilder and McCarey, Volume 7. The Tanvity Press, A. S. Barnes and Company, Inc. San Diego, California. pp. 295–314 ISBN 978-0498021817
- Poague, Leland. 1980. The Hollywood Professionals: Wilder and McCarey, Volume 7. The Tanvity Press, A. S. Barnes and Company, Inc. San Diego, California. ISBN 978-0498021817
- Silver, Charles. 2012. Leo McCarey's Ruggles of Red Gap. Inside/Out, Moma October 2, 2012. https://www.moma.org/explore/inside_out/2012/10/02/leo-mccareys-ruggles-of-red-gap/ Retrieved 7 April 2024.
