= National Board of Review Awards 1935 =

Annual US film awards ceremony

7th National Board of Review Awards

December 16, 1935

The 7th National Board of Review Awards were announced on 16 December 1935.

== Best American Films ==
1. The Informer
2. Alice Adams
3. Anna Karenina
4. David Copperfield
5. The Gilded Lily
6. Les Misérables
7. The Lives of a Bengal Lancer
8. Mutiny on the Bounty
9. Ruggles of Red Gap
10. Who Killed Cock Robin?

== Top Foreign Films ==
1. Chapayev
2. Crime and Punishment
3. Le Dernier Milliardaire
4. The Man Who Knew Too Much
5. Maria Chapdelaine
6. La Maternelle
7. The New Gulliver
8. Peasants
9. Thunder in the East
10. The Youth of Maxim

== Winners ==
- Best American Film: The Informer
- Best Foreign Film: Chapayev, U.S.S.R.
