= Island of Lost Souls (1932 film) =

1932 American sci-fi horror film

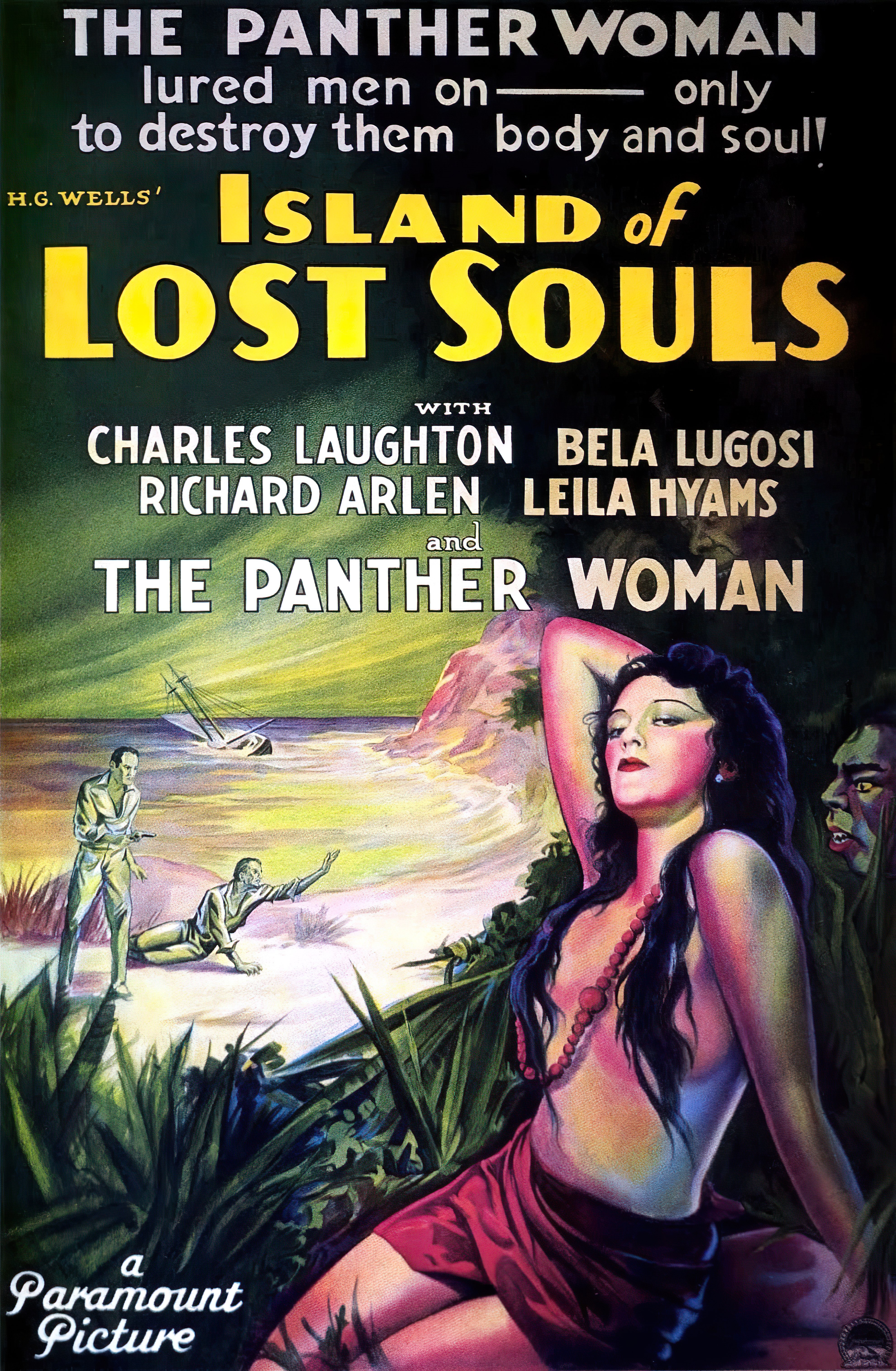
- Theatrical release poster
- Directed by: Erle C. Kenton
- Screenplay by: Waldemar Young; Philip Wylie
- Based on: The Island of Dr. Moreau by H. G. Wells
- Starring: Charles Laughton; Bela Lugosi; Richard Arlen; Leila Hyams; Kathleen Burke
- Cinematography: Karl Struss
- Production company: Paramount Productions, Inc.
- Distributed by: Paramount Productions, Inc.
- Release date: December 23, 1932 (Chicago)
- Running time: 70 minutes
- Country: United States
- Language: English

Island of Lost Souls is a 1932 American pre-Code science fiction horror film directed by Erle C. Kenton. Produced and distributed by Paramount Productions, it is based on H. G. Wells' 1896 novel The Island of Doctor Moreau, and stars Charles Laughton, Richard Arlen, and Kathleen Burke. Island of Lost Souls is about Edward Parker (Arlen), a sailor who finds himself stranded on an island that is occupied by the scientist Dr. Moreau (Laughton). Parker agrees to stay until the next boat arrives; Moreau introduces him to Lota (Burke), who unknown to Parker, is part-panther. It is revealed all of the island's inhabitants are the results of Moreau's experiments to create humans from animals. Moreau tries to persuade Lota to have sex with Parker so he can continue his experiments.

The film is Paramount's follow-up to the successful horror film Dr. Jekyll and Mr. Hyde (1931). Several writers, including Joseph Moncure March, Cyril Hume, Garrett Fort, and Philip Wylie, worked on scripts for the film. While Paramount had invited stage actor Charles Laughton to Hollywood, they did not have the film set up for him, leading him to work on other projects in 1932. For the role of Lota the Panther Woman, a contest was run across the United States to cast an unknown actor for the film. From thousands of contenders, the final group was Lona Andre, Gail Patrick, Verna Hillie, and the winner Kathleen Burke. Island of Lost Souls began production on October 1, 1932. Some scenes were filmed on location on Catalina Island. During production, Bela Lugosi joined the cast, having declared bankruptcy during the same month. Production ended in early November.

Island of Lost Souls was released in December 1932. Since then, several edited forms have been released with several edits to remove dialogue and scenes involving Dr. Moreau. The film was banned in several countries including the United Kingdom, Germany, Italy, India, and New Zealand. Theatrical, television, and home video releases have often been truncated until the 2011 release by the Criterion Collection, which was described by the company's president as one of the most difficult restorations they had done. Contemporaneous critical reception was mixed, noting the horrific nature of the film. Retrospective reviews have been positive and have often complimented Laughton's performance; some reviews praised the cinematography, while others noted the film's disturbing themes.

== Plot ==
Shipwrecked traveler Edward Parker is rescued by a freighter delivering animals to an isolated South Seas island owned by Dr. Moreau. Parker fights with the freighter's drunken captain who mistreats M'ling, a passenger with some bestial features, and the captain tosses Parker overboard into Mr. Montgomery's boat, which is bound for Moreau's island. When Parker arrives at the island, Moreau, who has M'ling as his butler, welcomes him and introduces him to Lota, a beautiful young woman who Moreau claims is of Polynesian origin.

When she and Parker hear screams coming from another room, which Lota calls "the House of Pain", Parker investigates. He sees Moreau and Montgomery operating on a human-like creature without anesthetic. Convinced Moreau is engaged in brutal vivisection, Parker tries to leave but encounters savage-looking humanoids resembling beasts emerging from the jungle. Moreau appears, cracks his whip and orders them, following their wolf-themed Sayer of the Law, to recite a series of rules ("the Law"), e.g., not eating meat or spilling blood, and the creatures disperse.

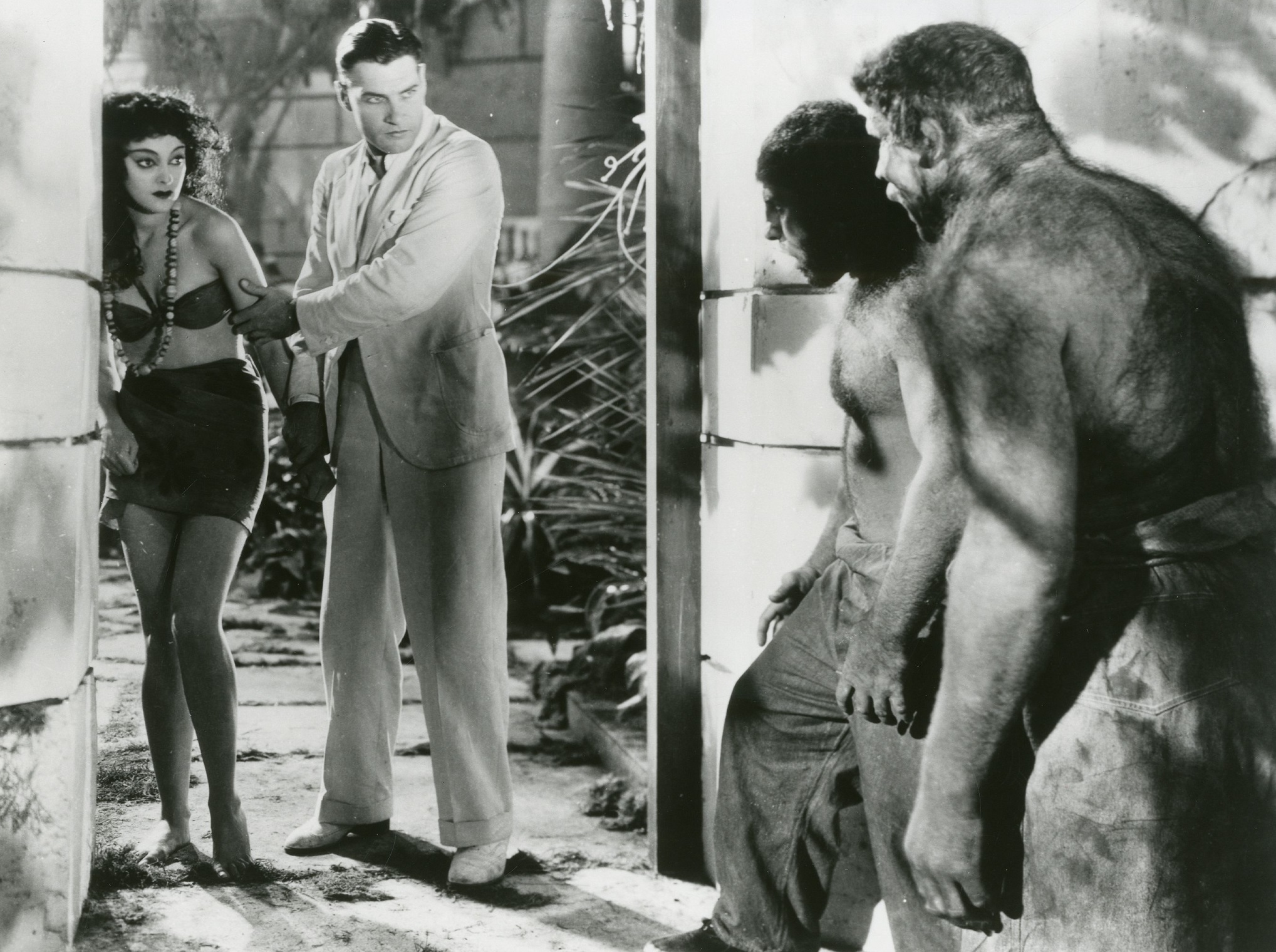
Kathleen Burke as Lota and Richard Arlen as Edward Parker

At the main house, Moreau tries to assuage Parker by explaining his scientific work—years before in London, he had begun experiments to accelerate the evolution of plants. He then progressed to animals, trying to transform them into humans through plastic surgery, blood transfusions, gland extracts and ray baths. When a dog hybrid escaped from his laboratory, it horrified people and he was forced to leave England.

Moreau tells Parker that Lota is the sole female on the island but hides the fact she was derived from a panther. Later, Moreau privately expresses his excitement to Montgomery that Lota is showing human emotions in her attraction to Parker. So he can continue observing this process, Moreau destroys the only available boat, ensuring Parker cannot leave, and blaming this on his beast-men. Lota falls in love with Parker and they eventually kiss. After Lota hugs him, Parker examines her fingernails, which are reverting to animalistic claws.

Parker storms into Moreau's to confront him for hiding the truth about Lota. Moreau explains Lota is his most-nearly human creation, and he wanted to see if she was capable of reproducing with a man. Enraged by the deceit, Parker punches Moreau and demands passage away from the island. Moreau observes Lota weeping and showing human emotions; his hopes are raised and he screams he will "burn out" the remaining animal in her in the House of Pain.

Meanwhile, the American consul at Apia, Samoa learns about Parker's location from the cowed freighter captain, after the captain fails to tell Parker's fiancée Ruth Thomas (whom Montgomery radioed from the freighter and whom the captain rudely propositions) why Parker is not on the ship, and she complains to the consul. Thomas persuades Captain Donahue to take her to Moreau's island. She is reunited with Parker and Moreau persuades them to stay the night. Moreau later tells Montgomery that Parker may not be needed to provide experimentation with fertility.

The ape-themed Ouran, one of Moreau's creations, tries to break into Ruth's room but is driven away by her screams. Montgomery confronts Moreau and implies Moreau arranged Ouran's attempted break-in. Donahue tries to reach the ship and fetch his crew. Moreau, seeing him depart, dispatches Ouran to strangle him; Ouran fights and kills Donahue.

Learning of Moreau's mortality and manipulations, the other beast-men no longer feel bound by the Law; as the Sayer declaims that Moreau made them into things, neither man nor beast, they set their huts ablaze, presumably kill M'ling (Moreau's loyal dog-man), who fights them, and defy Moreau, who tries and fails to regain control. The beast-men drag Moreau into his House of Pain and brutally hack him to death on the operating table with his own surgical knives. Parker and Ruth escape with help from the disaffected Montgomery. Parker tries to rescue Lota but she decides to buy the group some time when she notices Ouran ambushing them, leading to both of their deaths; in her dying moments, she tells Parker to flee to the sea. The others escape by boat as the island goes up in flames, presumably destroying Moreau's work and eradicating the beast-men.

== Cast ==
Cast sourced from the AFI Catalog of Feature Films.

- Charles Laughton as Dr. Moreau
- Richard Arlen as Edward Parker
- Leila Hyams as Ruth Thomas
- Bela Lugosi as Sayer of the Law
- Kathleen Burke as Lota, The Panther Woman
- Arthur Hohl as Montgomery
- Stanley Fields as Captain Davies
- Paul Hurst as Donahue
- Hans Steinke as Ouran
- Tetsu Komai as M'Ling

Some sources state that actors Buster Crabbe, Alan Ladd and Randolph Scott were among the beast-men extras, but no proof of this has been found.

== Production ==
=== Development ===
In 1931, Hollywood studios released three horror films that were hits: Universal's Dracula (1931) and Frankenstein (1931); and Paramount's Dr. Jekyll and Mr. Hyde (1931). Paramount's film's Mr. Hyde resembles a monstrous ape who has implied sexual relations with a sex worker Ivy; the studio wanted to make a follow-up with more horrific and sexual themes. On June 1, 1931, Paramount paid $15,000 (equivalent to $317,600 in 2025) for the rights to H. G. Wells' novel The Island of Dr. Moreau (1896) and sent a copy of the novel to the Motion Picture Producers and Distributors Association of America (MPPDA). Along with the novel, Paramount had access to an unproduced play by Frank Vreeland that was based on Wells' story and titled His Creatures.

Several writers attempted to work on the film's screenplay; these included Joseph Moncure March, who wrote the novel-length poem The Wild Party and the screenplay for Hell's Angels (1930); Cyril Hume, the screenwriter of Tarzan the Ape Man (1932) and later Forbidden Planet (1956); Garrett Fort, whose credits included work on Dracula and Frankenstein; and Philip Wylie, whose 1930 novel Gladiator was one of the main inspirations for the Superman comics. Fort and Wylie developed an original character, the Panther Woman—a creature Dr. Moreau creates in his House of Pain and tries to mate with a human. In one of Wylie's and Fort's early adaptations, Moreau beats the half-naked Panther Woman because instead of having sex with a younger male, the Panther Woman violently slashes him. Their adaptation had a far-more-gruesome ending that involved Moreau taking the novel's character Prendick to see a chained, faceless creature; Moreau, who is planning to kill Prendick, slices off his face and sews it onto the creature. The final, highly revised script is dated September 30, 1932, and gives credit only to Wylie and Waldemar Young. Young had written Lon Chaney silent melodramas such as London After Midnight (1927). Paramount sent their script to the MPPDA on September 22, 1932, noting the film was set to start shooting on September 26. Filming was delayed as the writers continued working on the script.

=== Pre-production ===
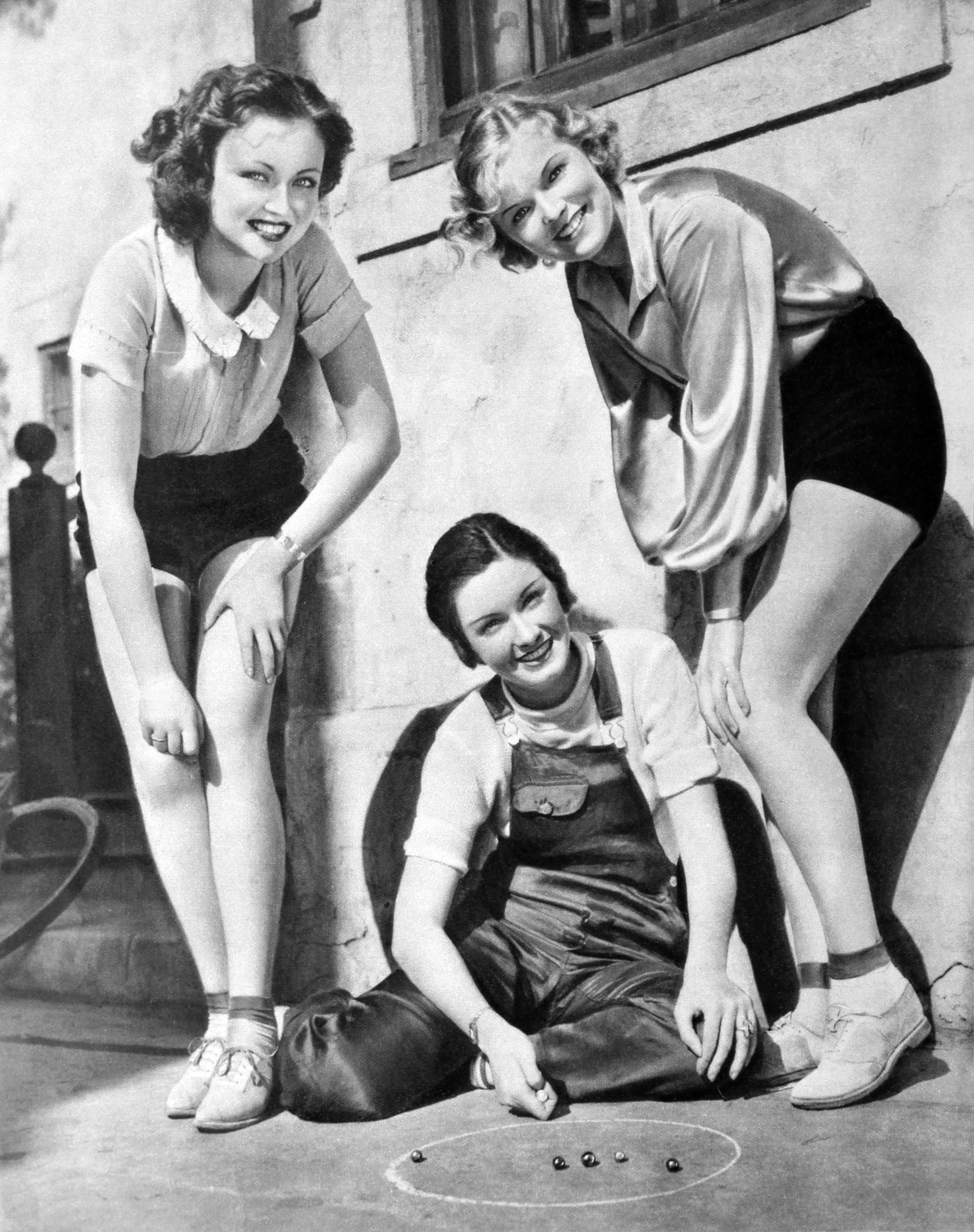
Lona Andre, Gail Patrick and Verna Hillie, finalists in Paramount Pictures' "Panther Woman" contest

To cast the Panther Woman, Paramount publicist Arthur Mayer developed a contest that involved giving the winner a trip to Hollywood, $200 (equivalent to $4,720 in 2025) a week for five weeks, a home at the Ambassador Hotel, and a role in the film. Contestants were required to be between the ages of 17 and 30 years old, to be in good health, between 5 feet 4 inches (163 cm) and 5 feet 8 inches (173 cm) tall, and not have worked, or be related to anyone who had worked, at Paramount. In his memoir Merely Colossal (1953), Mayer stated newspapers that were cooperating with Paramount on the project received floods of letters for the role. The contest attracted around 60,000 applicants. There were four finalists; Lona Andre, Gail Patrick, Kathleen Burke, and Verna Hillie. According to Hillie, who was living in Detroit, Paramount had published the content in several major city newspapers. Hillie was performing on radio at the time, and her mother submitted her for the contest. When Paramount contacted Hillie, she appeared as one of the 12 finalists in different theaters in Detroit on three succeeding Saturday nights. Each week a few of the finalists were eliminated from the contest. Audiences would privately vote for the performer they liked best, and Hillie won her spot in Detroit. As production was set to start, the four finalists of the Panther Woman contest arrived in Hollywood. According to historian Gregory Mank, early publicity photographs make the winners look "less like vamps, as they do like classmates at a convent school". The judges of the contest's final were Cecil B. DeMille, Rouben Mamoulian, Ernst Lubitsch, Norman Taurog, Stuart Walker, and Erle C. Kenton. On September 29, two days before production was set to begin, Kathleen Burke was summoned to the casting office and told she had won the contest. Hillie, Andre, and Patrick also received Paramount contracts.

Charles Laughton, who portrays Dr. Moreau in the film, had performed on stage in New York in 1931 and Paramount requested him to travel to Hollywood in early 1932. Paramount did not yet have a film ready for him, leading Laughton to appear in Universal's The Old Dark House (1932). On June 19, The New York Times announced Laughton would play the starring role in Island on Lost Souls. Prior to working on the film, Laughton worked on Paramount's Devil and the Deep (1932) and Metro-Goldwyn-Mayer's Payment Deferred (1932). To prepare for the role of Moreau, Laughton practiced using a bullwhip, which he had already used in the play A Man with Red Hair; his beard was inspired by a doctor Laughton had visited. Laughton was paid $2,250 per week for his work on the film. On July 31, Los Angeles Times wrote that Nancy Carroll and Randolph Scott, who were both under contract to Paramount, were to portray Ruth and Edward Parker, respectively; these roles later went to Richard Arlen and Leila Hyams. Among the extra actors were wrestlers Hans Steinke—who was known as The German Oak—and Harry Ezekian, who wrestled under the name Ali Baba. Steinke was cast as a beast-man and Ezekian as Gola.

Director Norman Taurog, who won the Academy Award for Best Director for Skippy (1931), was initially going to direct Island of Lost Souls. On September 20, 11 days before production on the film was set to begin, Variety wrote that Paramount was "having trouble injecting comedy into Island of Lost Souls" and had Taurog replaced by Erle C. Kenton. Kenton's cinematographer was Karl Struss, who won the Academy Award for Best Cinematography for F. W. Murnau's Sunrise: A Song of Two Humans (1927). Struss spoke positively about his relationship with Kenton, who he said had "a greater command of the English language than anyone I ever worked with".

=== Filming ===
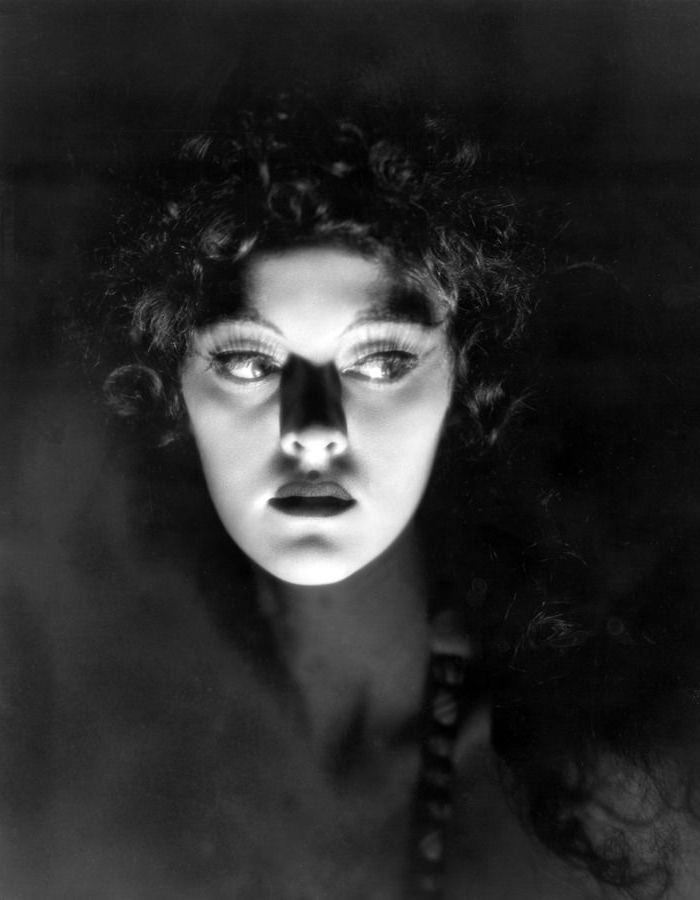
Kathleen Burke as the "Panther Woman"

Filming of Island of Lost Souls was set up to start on October 1, 1932, with a 28-day production schedule. Some actors, such as Tetsu Komai as M'ling the "Dog Man" who—as the September-30 shooting script stated, the role was as of yet uncast—were last-minute additions to the cast. Laughton, Arlen, Hyams, and Hohl went to Catalina Island for one week of location work. Some footage was filmed on SS Catalina which, according to Struss, had encountered real fog as called for in the script. During a scene, one of the extras who was dressed as a beast-man reportedly got too close to the bars of a tiger's cage, leading to the tiger nearly tearing his arm from its socket. The fate of the man is unknown but Laughton's wife Elsa Lanchester confirmed this story, recalling the incident shocked Laughton and others on the set.

Waldemar Young continued working on the script after filming began, and Emjo Basshe worked on the screenplay from September 19 throughout filming. After production was complete, The Pittsburgh Press published excerpts of the diary Burke kept during production. After her first day of filming, Burke wrote: "I wish I could go to sleep. I feel lonesome". Her second entry noted she was excited to film and that Kenton had asked her to slow her movements because she moved too quickly on set. A later entry said Kenton was very patient with Burke on set but that she was "so tired, I hardly could walk". It was announced Burke was going on a promotional tour for Island of Lost Souls after production, to which she responded to in her diary: "I'm going to be scared to death—trip over carpets, fall into the footlights or the bass drum or something. But, of course, it's an honor, and I'm going to do my best". On set, Burke's boyfriend from Chicago, Glen Rardin, began following her to work each day. The continuous visits led to a fist fight between Rardin and director Kenton.

On October 14, the Hollywood Citizen-News wrote that Paramount had added Bela Lugosi to the film's cast. Mank noted newspapers were often late in publishing casting information but that because this is the earliest note of Lugosi's casting, he was cast after the film started shooting. On October 17, Lugosi declared bankruptcy, having lost most of his money to friends after achieving popularity in Dracula, and signed on to the film for a salary of $875 (equivalent to $20,650 in 2025). Lugosi replaced George Barbier as the Sayer of the Law. Filming ended in early November 1932. Kenton filmed retakes of the scene of Ruth (Hyams) with Ouran (Steinke) on December 8.

== Release ==
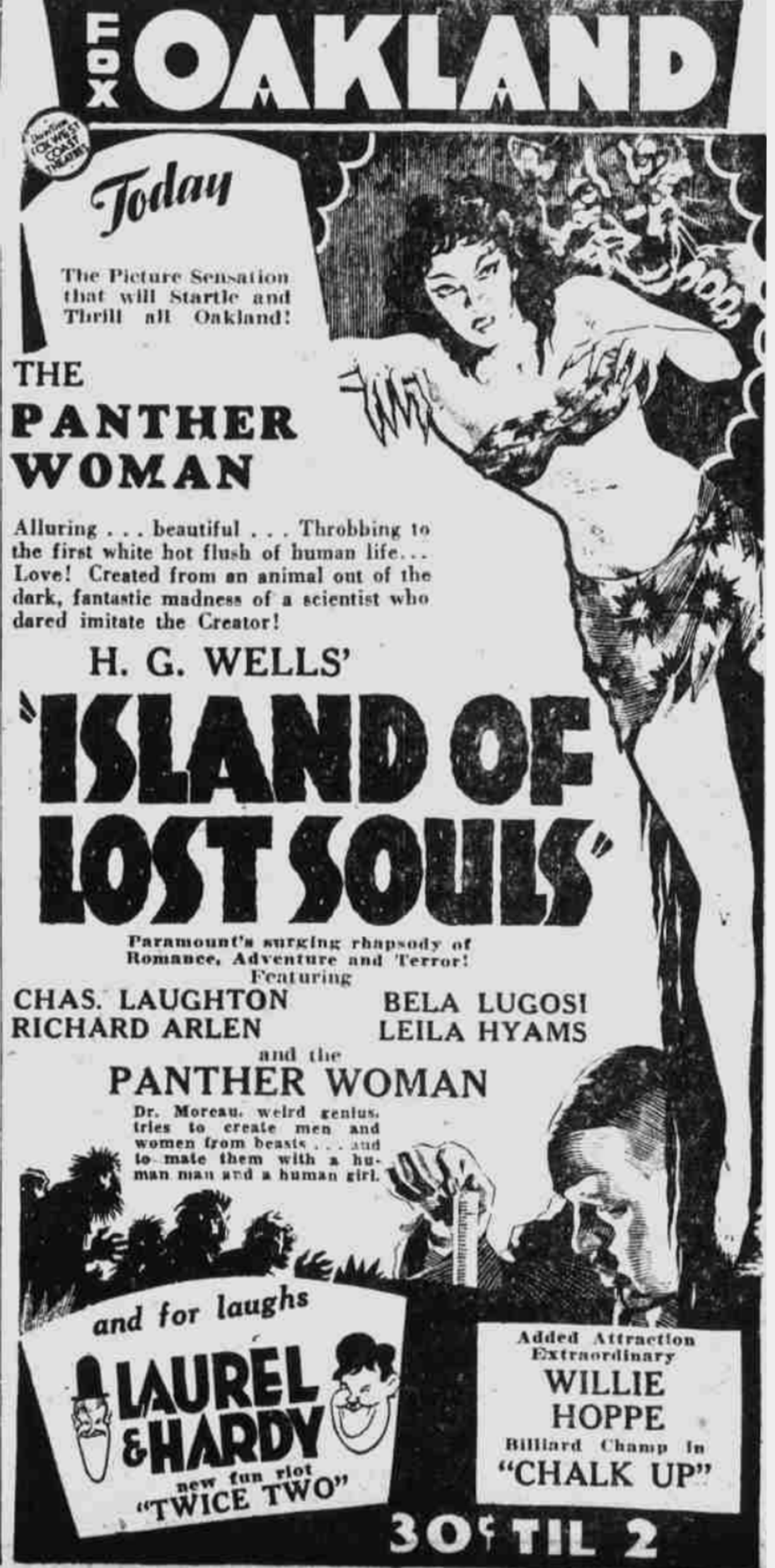
Newspaper advertisement from 1933

Island of Lost Souls debuted at Roosevelt Theatre in Chicago on December 23, 1932. Screenings were then held at Paramount Theatre in Los Angeles on January 7, 1933, and in New York's Rialto Theatre on January 11. At Paramount Theatre, the film earned $23,000 (equivalent to $572,000 in 2025) in its first and only week. At Rialto Theatre, the film was screened for three weeks, taking $26,100 (equivalent to $649,100 in 2025) in its first week. Burke was initially due to go on a personal-appearance tour with the film but this was canceled; instead, she was cast in Murders in the Zoo (1933) with Lionel Atwill. Island of Lost Souls was released across the United States, where several state censors edited the film. The film was banned in several countries, including Germany, the United Kingdom, Hungary, India, Italy, Latvia, the Netherlands, New Zealand, Singapore, and South Africa. It was also banned in Tasmania, Australia. The film's ban in the UK was lifted in 1958. In the 1958 re-release, the censors cut the entirety of Laughton's death scene. Dialogue of Moreau asking Montgomery about the Panther Woman (Note: The following lines, in which Moreau asks Montgomery about the Panther Woman, were removed from the film in several jurisdictions: "But how will she respond to Parker when there's no cause for fear? Will she be attracted? Is she capable of being attracted? Has she a woman's emotional impulses?") was cut in Pennsylvania, US; British Columbia and Quebec, Canada; and Australia. Scenes showing Moreau cutting into a screaming man were cut in Chicago; and in Alberta and British Columbia.

In 1935, Paramount wanted to reissue Island of Lost Souls but was denied a re-release by Joseph Breen's Hays Code due to the film's excessive horror. In 1941, Paramount attempted a second re-release, which led to a response stating:

[T]he blasphemous suggestion of the character, played by Charles Laughton, wherein he presumes to create human beings out of animals; the obnoxious suggestion of the attempt of these animals to mate with human beings, and the ... excessive gruesomeness and horror ... all these tend to make the picture quite definitely repulsive and not suitable for screen entertainment before mixed audiences.

No rental, profit, or loss for Paramount are known for the film, whose US box-office performance was below expectations.

In 1993, MCA/Universal Home Video released Island of Lost Souls on home video as part of their Universal Studios Monsters Classic Collection; along with The Ghost of Frankenstein (1942), House of Dracula (1945) and Invisible Agent (1942). Since its release on home video, Dave Kehr of The New York Times noted the difficulty in obtaining the film, stating that it "has only surfaced in dubious offshore editions, despite the constant clamoring of horror film aficionados". Kehr noted the film was off-market for such a long time because of a lack of material good enough for a high-definition release. The camera negative of Island of Lost Souls had been lost; the film had only survived through a handful of positive prints that varied in quality. The Criterion Collection had combined two 35-millimeter prints and had collectors' copies of some missing frames. Criterion's president Peter Becker said their restoration of the film for home video was "one of the two or three most challenging reconstructions and image restoration jobs we've ever done". In 2011, the label released the film on Blu-ray and DVD, and Eureka Entertainment released it as part of their Masters of Cinema line in 2012. Both releases use the same restoration.

== Reception ==
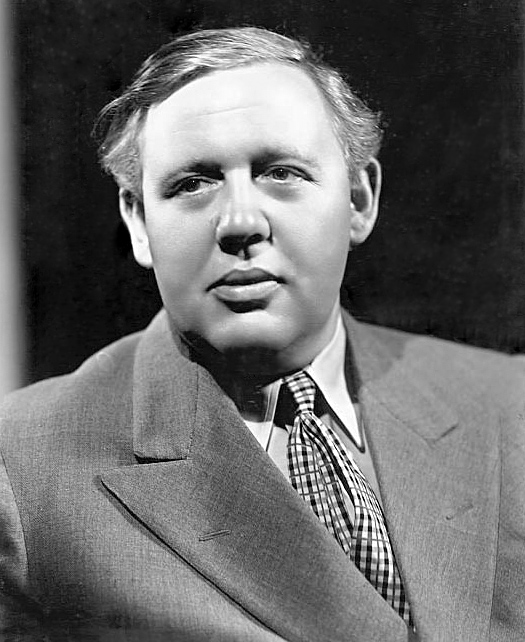
Charles Laughton in 1934. Laughton's performance was praised in several contemporary and retrospective reviews.

=== Contemporaneous ===
From pre-release screenings of Island of Lost Souls, an unnamed critic for The Hollywood Filmograph said on December 10, 1932, "All that can be done in the way of horror pictures has now definitely been done", and that the film "tops all the rest. It out-Frankensteins Frankenstein, and relegates all other thrillers to the class of children's bedtime stories …" The reviewer praised the acting of Laughton and Burke, and Kenton's directing. At the film's premiere in Chicago, Mae Tanee stated Burke "hasn't much to do other than crouch and run and open her eyes wide, but she is agile and uncamera-conscious and very well-suited to the part she plays". Philip K. Scheuer of Los Angeles Times called the film "extraordinarily bristly work", and noted its "suffocating atmosphere" and the performance of Laughton as Dr. Moreau. The reviewer called the film a "genuine shocker" that is "hard to shake off afterward" and concluded: "As art, it begins and ends with Charles Laughton".

A critic writing for New York Herald-Tribune said Island of Lost Souls has "the quality of a hangover"; the reviewer praised Laughton and described Burke's performance as possessing "a certain bewildered, sad-eyed quality that manages to be rather touching". B.M. of the Brooklyn Times-Union wrote the film might suffer in comparison to films like Frankenstein, Doctor X, and White Zombie. The reviewer praised the performances of Burke and Laughton, and said the film will "even provoke some of the more serious to speculative scientific thinking". Martin Dickstein of The Brooklyn Daily Eagle recommended Island of Lost Souls to horror fans, stating it is "as horrifying as anything the screens have offered in months", and calling it "immensely thrilling, in a few spots, you will probably find it a terrible bore in others" and concluding, "personally, it left us cold". "Waly." of Variety reviewed the film at the Rialto on January 11, 1933, stating it has good imagery and that "there are undoubtedly some horror sequences which are unrivaled"; the reviewer found the plot poor, comparing it to cheap adventure magazine stories and "grammar school mysteries". The reviewer also praised Laughton's performance but said Burke is "too much like a girl" than a panther-human hybrid. Mordaunt Hall reviewed the film for The New York Times, saying that "the attempt to horrify is not accomplished with any marked degree of subtlety, there is no denying that some of the scenes are ingeniously fashioned and are, therefore, interesting". Hall praised Laughton as "the best actor in the tale" whose performance greatly enhances the film.

=== Retrospective ===
Carlos Clarens said in his book An Illustrated History of the Horror Film (1967) nothing in Island of Lost Souls approaches the climatic terror of Wells' original novel; Clarens said the film's crowning achievement is Laughton as Dr. Moreau, that although it "seldom convinces, it never bores", and that Kenton achieved "a minor, not ineffective film". William K. Everson, in his book Classics of the Horror Film (1974), said Island of Lost Souls suffers from being "like the Hammer chillers of the 1950s and 1960s, it has all the ingredients but little of the mood required. One is often repelled by the film, but rarely convinced by it". According to Everson, Laughton gave a marvelous performance but "he rarely suggests anything much worse than a medically curious Captain Hook". Everson also praised the visuals, specifically the crane shots, and said Lugosi gave "a surprisingly good performance". A review in Phil Hardy's book Science Fiction (1984) said the film is "a superior adaptation" of Wells' novel, praising Laughton and Struss's cinematography.

In the book The Variety Book of Movie Lists (1994), director Joe Dante included Island of Lost Souls in his list of "Best Horror Films", while author Robert Bloch, author of Psycho (1959) included it on his list of Best Science Fiction and Fantasy films. Bloch earlier commented in the book The Horror People (1976): "Against the context of its time, [Island of Lost Souls] was a most unusual and daring film". In the November 1996 issue of Shivers, the magazine published its list of the best horror films, placing Island of Lost Souls at number 13. Contributor David J. Hogan said the film is "surely the most upsetting Horror film of the 30s, and perhaps of all time". Kim Newman reviewed the film in Empire in 2007, praising Laughton's performance and saying though it was "often imitated, this exercise in surreal dementia has never been matched" and "remains a neatly disturbing horror with a definitive ending". In the June 2012 issue of Sight & Sound, Michael Atkinson said Island of Lost Souls is "arguably the most disquieting and subtextually exploring of the 1930s Hollywood glut of horror adaptations", and that "no bigger compliment can be made to it than to say that the thematic ickiness of the film is intensified by its early-talkie mood and aura". Atkinson concluded the film "remains by far the best Moreau film (and maybe the best Wells adaptation ever), capturing vividly the sense of the book's ominous denouement". On review aggregator Rotten Tomatoes, Island of Lost Souls holds a "Fresh" approval rating of 88%, based on 41 reviews, and an average rating of 8.6/10. Its consensus reads: "Led by a note-perfect performance from Charles Laughton, Island of Lost Souls remains the definitive film adaptation of its classic source material".

== Legacy ==
In 1935, Screenland magazine interviewed H. G. Wells, who stated Island of Lost Souls is "terrible!" and that his story was "handled miserably. With all respect to Charles Laughton, who is a splendid actor, and others concerned in the making of this moving picture ... I must say that it was handled with a complete lack of imagination". Wells also disliked the film's emphasis on horror and how different it is from his novel, saying that "no subtlety was used in the creation of the dreadful atmosphere. The whole thing was so ridiculously obvious that I must repeat—it was miserable".

Following his work on Island of Lost Souls, Laughton returned to England and starred in The Private Life of Henry VIII (1933), for which he won the Academy Award for Best Actor. Cinematographer Struss later described his work on Island of Lost Souls as "one of my best photographic achievements". Burke married Rardin on February 25, 1933; their marriage was eventually dissolved. Burke performed in several more Hollywood films until 1940, when she returned to New York and lived privately thereafter, dying on April 9, 1980. Gail Patrick later spoke about the contest; she stated not winning was "[t]he best thing that ever happened to me", and that the "Panther Woman" character "came to haunt [Burke], and ruin her chances at better roles".

Some films that followed Island of Lost Souls also featured a mad scientist creating human-animal hybrids; these include Terror Is a Man (1959) and The Twilight People (1972). The next adaptation of The Island of Dr. Moreau was The Island of Dr. Moreau (1977), which had a budget of $7.25 million and Burt Lancaster in the title role. The 1977 film's producers and director Don Taylor said that it is not a remake of Kenton's production, while Don Shay noted in Cinefantastique the 1977 film borrows elements from the earlier film; these include the female lead Barbara Carrera as Maria. According to film historian Tom Weaver, Taylor described Kenton's 1932 film as "terrible". The 1996 film The Island of Dr. Moreau was made on the 100th anniversary of the novel's publication. John Frankenheimer, who directed the 1996 film, called Kenton's and Taylor's versions "so terrible". Richard Stanley, the screenwriter of the 1996 film, felt that the original novel had never "been properly adapted to screen" and that he felt Island of Lost Souls is "probably the best adaption [of the novel]", specifically the "atmosphere of oppression and pain", while finding the two official remakes "a step downwards".

== See also ==
- 1932 in science fiction
- Charles Laughton filmography
- List of horror films of the 1930s
- List of science fiction films of the 1930s
- List of Paramount Pictures films (1930–1939)
