= The Party (play) =

- Original language: English
- Written by: Jane Arden

Premiere
- Date: 28 May 1958
- Place: Noël Coward Theatre, London

The Party is a play by the British dramatist, actor and director Jane Arden (1927–82) which was first staged at the New Theatre, London on 28 May 1958. The play was directed by Charles Laughton and starred, in addition to Laughton himself, Albert Finney, Laughton's wife Elsa Lanchester, Ann Lynn, Joyce Redman, and John Welch. Following generally enthusiastic reviews The Party ran for six months at the New Theatre and has occasionally been performed in repertory since. The play was published by Samuel French Limited.

== Significance ==
The Party, which is set in Kilburn, is significant for a number of reasons. It was Laughton's final appearance on the London stage, despite being the first time he had acted in England since 1951. It was also the first appearance on the London stage by Albert Finney whom Laughton had seen playing Macbeth in Birmingham.

The play is also a significant early work by Arden, who by that time had already written for television and the theatre. The Party is, like much of Arden's other work for theatre, cinema and television, ground-breaking and innovative, in this case mainly for its daring exploration of mental illness and its effects on family dynamics. As Simon Callow, in his book Charles Laughton: A Difficult Actor (Methuen, 1987) says, 'The play actually anticipates a great deal of mid-sixties drama on the subject of society's imposition of conformity.' There are also disturbing intimations of an incestuous relationship between the central character Ettie and her father Richard but, due to the moral climate and censorship restrictions of the 1950s, Arden could not explore this theme openly.

== Reception ==
Despite its comparative success there are some commentators who think that Laughton largely misjudged the play in both his staging and casting. Curiously, no television or film version of The Party has ever been planned and this perhaps accounts partly for the play's relative obscurity in comparison with other contemporary works such as Look Back In Anger and A Taste of Honey.
