= Les Misérables (1935 film) =

1935 American film based on the novel of the same name directed by Richard Boleslawski

- Original film poster
- Directed by: Richard Boleslawski
- Screenplay by: W. P. Lipscomb
- Based on: Les Misérables; 1862 novel by Victor Hugo
- Produced by: Darryl F. Zanuck
- Starring: Fredric March
- Cinematography: Gregg Toland
- Edited by: Barbara McLean
- Music by: Alfred Newman
- Production company: Twentieth Century Pictures
- Distributed by: United Artists
- Release date: April 20, 1935
- Running time: 103 minutes
- Country: United States
- Language: English

Les Misérables is a 1935 American drama film starring Fredric March and Charles Laughton based upon the 1862 Victor Hugo novel of the same name. The movie was adapted by W. P. Lipscomb and directed by Richard Boleslawski. This was the last film for Twentieth Century Pictures before it merged with Fox Film Corporation to form 20th Century-Fox. The plot of the film mostly follows Hugo's novel Les Misérables, but there are many differences.

The film was nominated for the Oscar for Best Picture, the Academy Award for Best Assistant Director, the Academy Award for Best Cinematography, and the Academy Award for Best Film Editing. The National Board of Review named the film the sixth best of 1935.

== Plot ==
Jean Valjean is sentenced to ten years in the galleys for stealing bread to feed his sister’s starving family. After his release, he is rejected everywhere because of his yellow passport until a bishop gives him food and shelter. When Valjean steals the bishop’s silver, the bishop saves him from arrest by claiming the silver was a gift and adds two candlesticks, urging him to choose a life of giving rather than taking.

Years later, Valjean lives under the name Monsieur Madeleine and becomes a successful factory owner and mayor. Inspector Javert, devoted completely to the law, grows suspicious of him. Meanwhile, Fantine is dismissed from the factory after gossip about her child, falls into misery, and is rescued by Madeleine, who promises to bring her daughter Cosette back from the inn where she is being mistreated.

When Javert learns that another man has been arrested as Jean Valjean, Madeleine goes to court and reveals his true identity to save the innocent prisoner. He returns too late to save Fantine after Javert comes to arrest him, but he escapes and takes Cosette away with him.

Valjean and Cosette find refuge in a convent, where Cosette grows up. Years later they live quietly in Paris, where Cosette falls in love with Marius, a young law student connected to reformist students. Javert discovers their whereabouts, and Valjean prepares to flee with Cosette.

After learning that Marius is trapped at the barricades, Valjean goes to help him. There he gains control of Javert but spares his life instead of killing him. Valjean then carries the wounded Marius to safety and returns to Cosette.

Knowing the law is closing in on him, Valjean says farewell to Cosette and entrusts her future to Marius, telling them to love each other. He keeps the bishop’s candlesticks as a reminder that life is meant for giving. Unable to reconcile Valjean’s mercy with his rigid beliefs, Javert throws himself into the water and dies.

== Cast ==
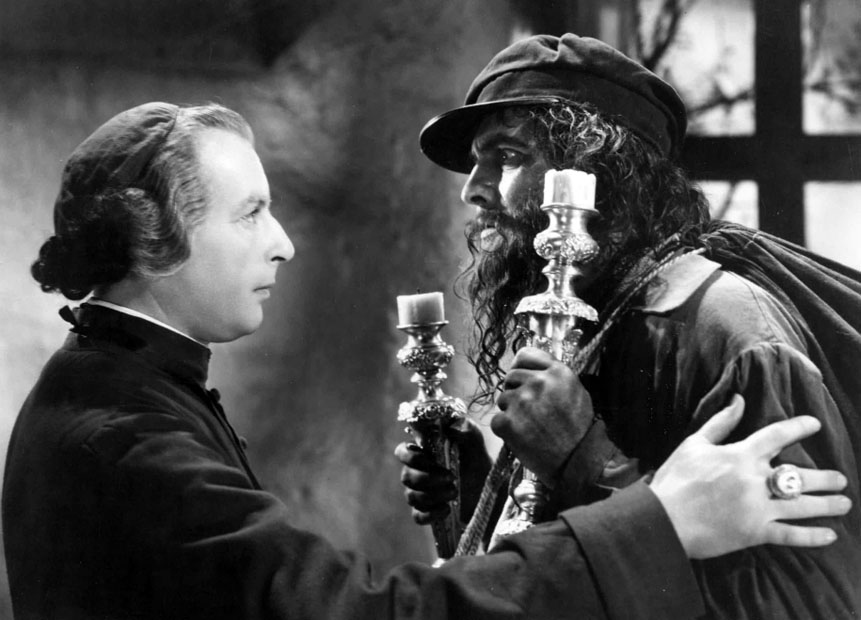
Cedric Hardwicke and Fredric March in Les Misérables

- Fredric March as Jean Valjean/Champmathieu
- Charles Laughton as Inspector Émile Javert
- Cedric Hardwicke as Bishop Myriel
- Rochelle Hudson as Cosette
- Marilyn Knowlden as Young Cosette
- Florence Eldridge as Fantine
- John Beal as Marius
- Frances Drake as Éponine
- Ferdinand Gottschalk and Jane Kerr as the Thénardiers
- Vernon Downing as Brissac
- Leonid Kinskey as Genflou
- Ian Maclaren as Head Gardener
- John Carradine as Enjolras
- Heinie Conklin as Drunk at Inn (uncredited)
- Harry Cording as Beam Warder (uncredited)
- Olaf Hytten as Pierre (uncredited)

== Differences from the novel ==
This adaptation made a lot of changes, many of which can also be found in later adaptations:

- Valjean's trial, life as a convict and release are presented chronologically, whereas in the novel, his previous life is presented in flashback. In addition, the novel begins by introducing the bishop, while in the film, he does not appear until Valjean arrives at his door.
- The film begins with Valjean being sentenced in 1800, for ten years, rather than in 1796, for five years.
- While the word "galleys" was still used until the late 19th century to designate the French Bagnios, the actual penalty of sending someone to the galleys was abolished in mid-18th century. The galleys portrayed in this film are an anachronism.
- In the film, Javert is shown being assigned to the galleys and seeing Valjean's display of strength at the beginning. In the novel, he is not introduced until after Valjean has become mayor.
- Javert's first name is given as Émile, while in the novel, it is never given.
- In the film, Valjean's prison number is 2906, while in the novel it is 24601.
- In the novel, Javert is described as a tall man, with a small head, sunken eyes, large sideburns and long hair hanging over his eyes, which differs greatly from Charles Laughton's appearance, and his version of Javert in the film wears different clothes than in the novel.
- Valjean is released after the 10-year sentence, despite mention of an escape attempt. In the novel he spends 19 years in prison, having been given extra time for trying to escape. He still receives a yellow passport, branding him a violent man for his attempts, however.
- In the film, there is no mention of Fantine selling her hair and teeth, or becoming a prostitute, to afford her payments to the Thénardiers. When she confronts Valjean, she does appear to be dressed like a prostitute, but neither Valjean nor Javert make any reference to her clothing.
- In the film, Valjean brings Cosette to Fantine before Fantine dies, while in the novel, Cosette does not meet her mother again, and is not informed of her mother's identity or fate until Valjean is on his own deathbed at the end of the novel.
- The Thénardiers' inn is called "The Sergeant at Waterloo" in the novel, but is called "The Brave Sergeant" in the film.
- In the novel, Valjean pays Thénardier 1,500 francs to settle Fantine's debts and takes Cosette; the Thénardiers appear in Paris several years later. No discussion regarding Valjean's intentions takes place in the film; after speaking with Cosette alone, Valjean is seen riding away with her and the Thénardiers are not seen again.
- In the novel, only three prisoners (Brevet, Chenildieu, and Cochepaille) identify Champmathieu as being Valjean in court. The film adds a fourth convict, Genflou, to the witnesses.
- In the film, Valjean and Cosette go to the convent with a letter of introduction from M. Madeleine, whereas in the novel, they came upon the convent coincidentally while fleeing from Javert.
- Valjean rescues a man whose cart had fallen on him, which arouses Javert's suspicion, but the film does not mention that this man (Fauchelevent) and the gardener at the convent are the same person.
- Marius meets Valjean and Cosette while they ride into the park where he is giving a speech, while in the novel he is simply walking in the Luxembourg Garden when he sees them.
- Éponine's role is changed from the novel. In the film, she is the secretary of the revolutionary society Marius belongs to. In the novel, she is the Thénardiers' daughter, and is not connected to the revolutionary society. The film makes no mention of her being the Thénardiers' daughter.
- Gavroche is cut entirely.
- In the novel, Enjolras is the leader of the revolutionaries and Marius is not even a very faithful follower (him being a Bonapartist with different ideas than his friends). In the film, Marius is the leader. In addition, the students' goal is not a democracy but to better the conditions in the French galleys.
- In the film, Éponine delivers the message from Marius to Cosette, which Valjean intercepts, causing Valjean to come to the barricade to rescue Marius. In the novel, Gavroche delivers it.
- In the film, Javert pursues Valjean and Marius into the sewers, which he does not in the novel, although he does meet Valjean when he exits the sewers, having pursued Thénardier there.
- Valjean brings Marius to Valjean's house and Cosette, while in the novel, Valjean brings Marius to the house of Marius' grandfather M. Gillenormand, who does not appear in the film. Also, while Valjean thinks Javert is waiting for him and he is going away, he gives Marius and Cosette instructions, including to love each other always and leaving the candlesticks to Cosette, which in the novel appear in his deathbed scene.
- In the film, Valjean hides the fact that he expects Javert to arrest him by reiterating to Cosette and Marius his plan to move to England.
- The film ends with Javert's suicide, while at the end of the novel, Valjean dies of grief after having been separated from Cosette, because Marius severed all ties with him after learning of Valjean's convict past, but both arrive to see him before he dies.

== See also ==
- Adaptations of Les Misérables
