= 12 Angry Men =

1957 film by Sidney Lumet

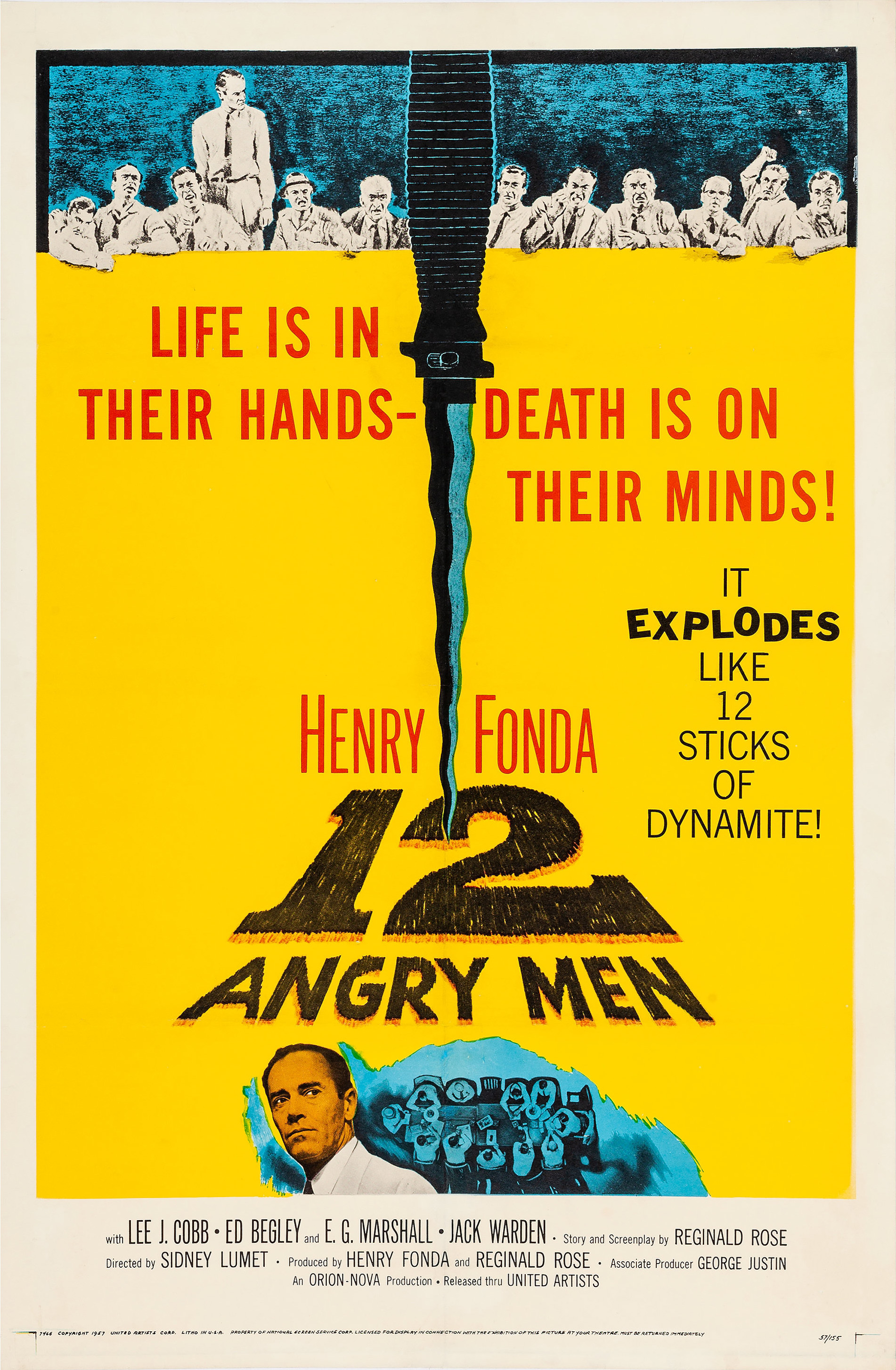
- Theatrical release poster
- Directed by: Sidney Lumet
- Screenplay by: Reginald Rose
- Based on: Twelve Angry Men by Reginald Rose
- Produced by: Henry Fonda; Reginald Rose
- Starring: Henry Fonda; Lee J. Cobb; Ed Begley; E. G. Marshall; Jack Warden
- Cinematography: Boris Kaufman
- Edited by: Carl Lerner
- Music by: Kenyon Hopkins
- Production company: Orion-Nova Productions
- Distributed by: United Artists
- Release date: April 10, 1957 (Fox Wilshire Theater)
- Running time: 96 minutes
- Country: United States
- Language: English
- Budget: $337,000
- Box office: $2 million (rentals)

12 Angry Men is a 1957 American legal drama film directed by Sidney Lumet in his feature directorial debut, adapted by Reginald Rose from his 1954 teleplay. A critique of the American jury system during the McCarthy era, the film tells the story of a jury of twelve men as they deliberate the conviction or acquittal of a teenager charged with murder on the basis of reasonable doubt; disagreement and conflict among the jurors forces them to question their morals and values. It stars an ensemble cast, featuring Henry Fonda (who also produced the film with Rose), Lee J. Cobb, Ed Begley, E. G. Marshall, and Jack Warden.

An independent production distributed by United Artists, 12 Angry Men received acclaim from critics, despite a lukewarm box-office performance. At the 30th Academy Awards, it was nominated for Best Picture, Best Director and Best Screenplay. It is regarded by many as one of the greatest films ever made.

In 2007, it was selected for preservation in the United States National Film Registry by the Library of Congress as being "culturally, historically or aesthetically significant". Additionally, it was selected as the second-best courtroom drama ever (after 1962's To Kill a Mockingbird) by the American Film Institute for their AFI's 10 Top 10 list.

== Plot ==
On a hot summer day in the New York County Courthouse, the trial has just concluded of an 18-year-old boy, characterized as a "slum kid", who is accused of killing his abusive father. The judge instructs the jury that if there is reasonable doubt, they must return a verdict of "not guilty". If found guilty by unanimous verdict, the defendant will receive a mandatory death sentence via the electric chair.

At first, the case seems clear. A neighbor who lives opposite testifies to having seen the defendant stab his father, as she lay in bed looking out of her window and through the windows of a passing elevated train into the apartment where the killing took place. A disabled neighbor living below testifies that he heard the defendant threaten to kill his father, then heard the body hitting the floor. He says that on going to his door and opening it, he saw the defendant running down the stairs. The defendant had recently purchased, but claims he had lost, a switchblade of the same type that was found at the murder scene, wiped of fingerprints.

In a preliminary vote, all jurors vote "guilty" except Juror 8, who wants discussion before any verdict. When his first few arguments – including proving that the switchblade, believed to be unique, is in fact not – fail to convince the other jurors, he suggests a secret ballot. This reveals one other "not guilty" vote; Juror 9 reveals that he, too, now agrees there should be more discussion.

Juror 8 argues that the noise of the passing train would have obscured everything the second witness claimed to have overheard. Several jurors question whether the death threat, even if correctly overheard, was simply a figure of speech. Juror 11 doubts that a defendant who was clear headed enough to wipe the blade of fingerprints would risk returning to the crime scene. Jurors 5 and 11 change their votes. After looking at a diagram of the second witness's apartment and conducting an experiment, the jurors determine that it was impossible for the disabled witness to have made it to the door in the time he stated. Infuriated at a comment made by Juror 8, Juror 3 lunges at him and threatens to kill him; all go silent as they realize his words cannot reasonably be taken literally. Jurors 2 and 6 change their votes; the jury is now evenly split.

The victim's stab wound was angled downwards. Juror 5, who has had personal experience with switchblades, points out that such blades are designed to be thrust upwardly, and that a downward thrust from a shorter, experienced assailant is inconceivable, as it would have required the blade to have been repositioned in the killer's hand. Jurors 7, 12 and 1 change their votes, leaving the jurors split 9:3. Juror 10 delivers a prejudiced rant against people from slum backgrounds, and the other jurors distance themselves from him.

Juror 4 states that the evidence from the woman who saw the killing from her bed is incontrovertible, convincing Juror 12 to revert to a guilty vote. After watching Juror 4 remove his glasses and rub the impressions they made on his nose, Juror 9 realizes that the witness was constantly rubbing similar marks on her own nose, showing that she was a regular glasses-wearer despite not wearing them in court. Juror 8 remarks that the witness's evidence must be questionable, as she said she was in bed trying to sleep at the time, when she would not have been wearing her glasses, nor would she have had time to put them on. All jurors apart from Juror 3 now vote not guilty.

Failing to convince the others, Juror 3 explodes in a fit of rage, opens his wallet and rips up a photograph of himself and his son. Seemingly realizing that his strained relationship with his son is the reason for his certainty, he breaks down in tears, and changes his vote. The jurors leave the jury room, now unanimous that the defendant should be acquitted. Juror 8 helps Juror 3 with his jacket. As they leave the courthouse, Jurors 8 and 9 briefly exchange names before parting ways.

== Cast ==
The film's trailer

Juror	Actor	Description
1	Martin Balsam	The foreman; a calm and methodical assistant high school football coach.
2	John Fiedler	A meek and unpretentious bank teller who is easily flustered, but eventually stands up for himself.
3	Lee J. Cobb	A loud, hot-tempered owner of a messenger service who is estranged from his son; the most passionate advocate of a "guilty" verdict.
4	E. G. Marshall	An unflappable, conscientious, and analytical stockbroker who is concerned only with facts, not opinions.
5	Jack Klugman	A Baltimore Orioles fan who grew up in a violent slum, and is sensitive to bigotry towards "slum kids".
6	Edward Binns	A tough but principled and courteous house painter who stands up to others, especially over the elderly being verbally abused.
7	Jack Warden	An impatient and wisecracking salesman who is more concerned about the Yankees game he is missing than the case.
8	Henry Fonda	A humane, justice-seeking architect and father of three; initially, the only one to question the evidence and vote "not guilty". The closing scene reveals his surname is 'Davis'.
9	Joseph Sweeney	A thoughtful and intelligent elderly man who is highly observant of the witnesses' behaviors and their possible motivations. The closing scene reveals his surname is 'McCardle'.
10	Ed Begley	A pushy, loud-mouthed and xenophobic garage owner.
11	George Voskovec	A polite European watchmaker and naturalized American citizen who demonstrates strong respect for democratic values such as due process.
12	Robert Webber	An indecisive and easily distracted advertising executive.

Other, uncredited actors in the film include Rudy Bond as the judge, Tom Gorman as the court stenographer, James Kelly as the bailiff, Billy Nelson as the clerk, and John Savoca as the defendant.

== Themes ==
Professor of Law Emeritus at UCLA School of Law Michael Asimow referred to the film as a "tribute to a common man holding out against lynch mob mentality". Gavin Smith of Film Comment called the film "a definitive rebuttal to the lynch mob hysteria of the McCarthy era".

Business academic Phil Rosenzweig called the jury in 12 Angry Men being made up entirely of white men "especially important", writing: "Many of the twelve would have looked around the room, and, seeing other white men, assumed that they had much in common and should be able to reach a verdict without difficulty. As they deliberate, however, fault lines begin to appear—by age, by education, by national origin, by socioeconomic level, by values, and by temperament."

== Production ==
=== Development ===
Reginald Rose's screenplay for 12 Angry Men, titled Twelve Angry Men, was initially produced for television and was inspired by a jury summons. Although it is unclear what trial he was summoned to, (Note: According to scholar Phil Rosenzweig, although the prosecution of William Viragh was the most likely trial Rose served on according to his account, a handwritten list of jurors that served on that trial does not include Rose.) according to Rose he served as a juror on a manslaughter case in the New York Court of General Sessions in early 1954. Though he and the other jurors initially attended begrudgingly, Rose was deeply affected by the impassioned and deliberate atmosphere of the trial and the finality of the jury's verdict. Rose began writing Twelve Angry Men upon realizing that very few people knew what occurred during jury deliberations and that they could serve as an exciting setting for a drama. To fit the screenplay within the available fifty-minute time slot, Rose cut planned passages of dialogue, resulting in less nuanced characters. A live production of "Twelve Angry Men", directed by Franklin Schaffner and starring Robert Cummings as Juror 8 and Franchot Tone as Juror 3, was broadcast on the CBS program Westinghouse Studio One on September 20, 1954, to positive reviews. It received four nominations for the 7th Primetime Emmy Awards, winning three on March 7, 1955: "Best Actor in a Single Performance", "Best Direction", and "Best Written Dramatic Material".

In February 1955, actor Henry Fonda formed Orion Productions under a three-year deal with distributor United Artists. He reportedly first saw Westinghouse Studio One's "Twelve Angry Men" as a kinescope in a Hollywood projection room following its award success. He was impressed with the story and wanted to star as Juror 8. In mid-1956, Fonda partnered with Rose to produce a film adaptation. As part of the partnership, Rose formed Nova Productions and combined it with Fonda's Orion Productions to form Orion-Nova Productions, and production of the film was budgeted at $340,000. Rose restored material he had cut for the TV broadcast and added dialogue revealing his characters' backgrounds and motivations.

Fonda and Rose recruited Sidney Lumet to direct 12 Angry Men, his film directorial debut. Lumet had previously directed numerous episodes, including adaptations of Rose's plays, for TV series such as Danger and You Are There. Fonda said he hired Lumet because of his proficient directing skills and because he was "wonderful with actors". Lumet recruited Boris Kaufman as the cinematographer. Kaufman had recently won an Academy Award for Best Cinematography for On the Waterfront (1954), and Lumet believed Kaufman's "realist style" suited the film.

=== Filming ===
The film was shot in New York and completed after a short but rigorous rehearsal schedule, in less than three weeks, on a budget of $337,000 (equivalent to $3,863,000 in 2025). Fonda said in 1957, "We shot this picture in 21 days, for $40,000 less than our modest $380,000 budget....we rehearsed for two weeks before even a thought of shooting. Everybody had a firm idea of what he was to say and do." Rose and Fonda took salary deferrals. Faith Hubley, later to be known for her Oscar-winning animated efforts with spouse John, was script supervisor for the film.

Cinematographer Boris Kaufman described the film's longest single take beginning under the opening credits: "The opening scene was the longest single take I have ever done in all my years as a cinematographer. It ran for seven consecutive minutes. It was made up of 18 separate camera movements which actually showed 18 basic fact situations. It also established the basic style and mood of the picture. During the seven-minute take the camera introduces the twelve men in a very casual way as they bump into each other and exchange casual remarks which are not at all related to the case on trial. Yet in this way each character immediately begins to relate to every other man in the room and to the story."

The film was shot out-of sequence and without all 12 actors always present, as director Lumet explained: "When you shoot a movie that is nothing by 12 men's faces as they talk angrily to one another and you shoot it out of sequence and the camera is being moved from one angle to another around a room, then you go elaborately nuts trying to be consistent about who is looking where and at whom. In making 'Angry Men' the camera went around the table, shooting chair by chair. Once lights and cameras were pointed at a chair, then every speech, no matter its order in the movie, was shot. That meant that often you had only two or three actors in or near chairs, talking and arguing across the table with actors who were not there. You had to figure out where the nonexistent actor's eyes would be, so that the existent actor could stare him down. I spent nights puzzling the problem and my script became a maze of diagrams. We had arguments on the set as people tried to explain to me that I was crazy. But the diagrams came out right 396 times in 397 scenes. One we had to reshoot because I had the stockbroker looking the wrong way as he spoke to another actor." Fonda described the efficient filming similarly: "Normally, setup is worked out carefully, the scene is shot and there's a long lull while the next setup is being made. Not this time. With the camera positioned for, say, Scene 24, Lumet shot that one, and followed it immediately with Scenes 82, 105, or whatever others called for the same placement of the camera. Rehearsals, of course, had made everyone totally familiar with every scene in the picture."

At the beginning of the film, the cameras are positioned above eye level and mounted with wide-angle lenses, to give the appearance of greater depth between subjects, but as the film progresses the focal length of the lenses is gradually increased. By the end of the film, nearly everyone is shown in closeup, using telephoto lenses from a lower angle, which decreases or "shortens" depth of field. Lumet stated that his intention in using these techniques with Kaufman was to create a nearly palpable sense of claustrophobia. As director Lumet told Life magazine: "We did all we could honestly do on a one-set movie to heighten the drama. We created a claustrophobic tension by gradually changing camera lenses to narrow the room and crowd up the table. Little by little we lowered the camera level to shoot up at the furious jurymen. And the rate of changes in camera angles is stepped up as the talk grows larger and fiercer."

Cinematographer Boris Kaufman discussed his efforts: "The entire story was straitjacketed inside a one-room set. After much thought and discussion, we decided there was only one way to overcome the possibility of static cinematography. That was to turn the disadvantage of a single set into a pictorial advantage. We decided to use the camera to play up the feeling of confinement and thus contribute dramatically to the total expression of the story, making the confinement an integral pictorial part of the mood. There was another pictorial technique we used to emphasize changes in the mood of the story and in the interlocking themes of the plot. This was in the basic lighting patterns, three in all. First the lighting suggests bright daylight as the hot afternoon sun shines through the windows as the jury files into the room. The second stage is reached when the action in the room becomes tight and charged with the oppressive heat of the summer day; the camera moves in again and again to show the tense, electric undercurrents related to the drama going on between the men of the jury. This effect is then heightened by darkening skies in the background, a sudden darkness in the room, and the sound of thunder off in the distance. And finally, the pictorial effect of a rainstorm which pours down on the city, and breaks the tension within the room at the height of the emotional battle that has been going on for over an hour and a half(…).The storm breaks only after the jurors' fateful decision has been made."

== Reception ==
=== Box office ===
The film was a box office disappointment in the US but did better internationally. The advent of color and widescreen productions may have contributed to its disappointing box office performance. It was not until its first airing on television that the film finally found its audience.

=== Contemporary response ===
On its first release, 12 Angry Men received critical acclaim.

A. H. Weiler of The New York Times wrote, "It makes for taut, absorbing, and compelling drama that reaches far beyond the close confines of its jury room setting." His observation of the twelve men was that "their dramas are powerful and provocative enough to keep a viewer spellbound." Variety called it an "absorbing drama" with acting that was "perhaps the best seen recently in any single film", adding: "Perhaps the motivations of each juror are introduced too quickly and are repeated too often [...] However, the film leaves a tremendous impact." Philip K. Scheuer of the Los Angeles Times declared it a "tour de force in movie making", The Monthly Film Bulletin deemed it "a compelling and outstandingly well-handled drama", and John McCarten of The New Yorker called it "a fairly substantial addition to the celluloid landscape". The Chicago Tribune reviewer thought the script "one of the best constructed and tautly written of the year....[Reginald Rose's] gift for reproducing the present day idiom adds to the validity of his 12 subjects as they struggle to reach common ground."

== Legacy ==
The film is viewed as a classic, highly regarded from both a critical and popular viewpoint: Roger Ebert listed it as one of his "Great Movies". The American Film Institute named Juror 8, played by Henry Fonda, 28th in a list of the 50 greatest movie heroes of the 20th century. AFI also named 12 Angry Men the 42nd-most inspiring film, the 88th-most heart-pounding film and the 87th-best film of the past hundred years. In 2011, the film was one of the top 20 most screened films in secondary schools in the United Kingdom. The February 2020 issue of New York Magazine lists 12 Angry Men as among "The Best Movies That Lost Best Picture at the Oscars".

As of November 2026, the film holds a 100% approval rating on Rotten Tomatoes based on 61 reviews, with a weighted average of 9.4/10. The site's consensus reads: "Sidney Lumet's feature debut is a superbly written, dramatically effective courtroom thriller that rightfully stands as a modern classic". Metacritic, which uses a weighted average, assigned the film a score of 97 out of 100, based on 18 critics, indicating "universal acclaim". As of May 2026, the film is the 3rd highest rated narrative feature film on Letterboxd with an average rating of 4.6/5.

== Awards and nominations ==
The film was selected as the second-best courtroom drama ever by the American Film Institute during their AFI's 10 Top 10 list, just after To Kill a Mockingbird, and is the highest rated courtroom drama on Rotten Tomatoes' 300 Best Movies of All Time.

Award ceremony	Date of ceremony	Category	Recipient(s)	Result	Ref(s)
Academy Awards	March 26, 1958	Best Picture	Henry Fonda and Reginald Rose	Nominated	
Academy Awards	March 26, 1958	Best Director	Sidney Lumet	Nominated	
Academy Awards	March 26, 1958	Best Adapted Screenplay	Reginald Rose	Nominated	
British Academy Film Awards	March 6, 1958	Best Film	12 Angry Men	Nominated	
British Academy Film Awards	March 6, 1958	Best Foreign Actor	Henry Fonda	Won	
Berlin International Film Festival	July 2, 1957	Golden Bear	Sidney Lumet	Won	
Blue Ribbon Awards	February 5, 1960	Best Foreign Film	Sidney Lumet	Won	
Edgar Awards	1958	Best Motion Picture	Reginald Rose	Won	
Étoiles de cristal	April 15, 1958	Prix International	12 Angry Men	Won	
Golden Globe Awards	February 22, 1958	Best Motion Picture – Drama	12 Angry Men	Nominated	
Golden Globe Awards	February 22, 1958	Best Director	Sidney Lumet	Nominated	
Golden Globe Awards	February 22, 1958	Best Actor in a Motion Picture – Drama	Henry Fonda	Nominated	
Golden Globe Awards	February 22, 1958	Best Supporting Actor – Motion Picture	Lee J. Cobb	Nominated	
National Board of Review	December 1957	Top Ten Films	12 Angry Men	Won	
Writers Guild of America Awards	March 12, 1958	Best Written Drama	Reginald Rose	Won	

American Film Institute lists:

- AFI's 100 Years...100 Thrills – No. 88
- AFI's 100 Years...100 Heroes & Villains: Juror No. 8 – No. 28 Hero
- AFI's 100 Years...100 Cheers – No. 42
- AFI's 100 Years...100 Movies (10th Anniversary Edition) – No. 87
- AFI's 10 Top 10 – No. 2 Courtroom Drama

== Legal analyses ==
Speaking at a screening of the film during the 2010 Fordham University School of Law Film Festival, Supreme Court Justice Sonia Sotomayor stated that seeing 12 Angry Men while she was in college influenced her decision to pursue a career in law. She was particularly inspired by immigrant Juror 11's monologue on his reverence for the American justice system. She also told the audience of law students that, as a lower-court judge, she would sometimes instruct juries to not follow the film's example, because most of the jurors' conclusions are based on speculation, not fact. Sotomayor noted that events such as Juror 8 entering a similar knife into the proceeding; performing outside research into the case matter in the first place; and ultimately the jury as a whole making broad, wide-ranging assumptions far beyond the scope of reasonable doubt (such as the inferences regarding the woman wearing glasses) would not be allowed in a real-life jury situation, and in fact would have yielded a mistrial (assuming that applicable law permitted the content of jury deliberations to be revealed).

In 2007, legal scholar Michael Asimow argued that the jury in 12 Angry Men reached an incorrect verdict, writing that the amount of circumstantial evidence against the defendant should have been enough to convict him, even if the testimony of the two eyewitnesses was disregarded.

In the same year, drawing on empirical research, legal scholar Valerie Hans noted that while 12 Angry Men's depiction of a lone dissenter converting the majority is rare in reality, the film accurately portrays how quality deliberation, diverse perspectives, and the unanimity requirement can enable thoughtful dissenters to meaningfully influence jury outcomes, particularly when arguing for acquittal.

In 2012, Mike D'Angelo of The A.V. Club questioned the verdict of the jury in the film, writing: "What ensures The Kid's guilt for practical purposes, [...] is the sheer improbability that all the evidence is erroneous. You'd have to be the jurisprudential inverse of a national lottery winner to face so many apparently damning coincidences and misidentifications. Or you'd have to be framed [...] But there's no reason offered in 12 Angry Men for why, say, the police would be planting switchblades."

== Adaptations and parodies ==
There have been a number of adaptations of 12 Angry Men owing to its popularity and legacy.

Following the film's release, the stage rights were sold. It quickly became a popular play in Europe, including in a French version by Andre Obey, which was a hit in Paris in 1958, and a German version by Horst Budjuhn. It has been very popular on stage, in part due to its single location. Rose also created a stage version himself.

A 1963 German TV production, Die zwölf Geschworenen, was directed by Günter Gräwert, and a 1973 Spanish production, Doce hombres sin piedad, was made for TV 22 years before Spain allowed jury trials, while a 1991 homage by Kōki Mitani, 12 gentle Japanese (Japanese: 12人の優しい日本人, Hepburn: Juninin no Yasashii Nihonjin), posits a Japan with a jury system and features a group of Japanese people grappling with their responsibility in the face of Japanese cultural norms.

A 1970 episode of The Odd Couple television series (also co-starring Jack Klugman) entitled "The Jury Story" is reminiscent of 12 Angry Men, as it tells in a flashback the circumstances behind the meeting of roommates Oscar Madison and Felix Unger. Klugman (Madison) plays a juror on a panel during a supposedly open-and-shut case. Co-star Tony Randall (Unger) portrays the lone holdout who votes not guilty, eventually convincing the other eleven jurors.

A 1978 episode of Happy Days entitled "Fonzie for the Defense" contains a situation similar to 12 Angry Men when Howard Cunningham and Fonzie find themselves the only members of the jury who are not ready to convict the defendant just because he rides a motorcycle.

A 1986 episode of Murder, She Wrote entitled "Trial by Error" pays tribute to 12 Angry Men. The major twists are originally 10 jurors vote for "not guilty" due to self defense, Jessica votes "unsure" and another juror votes "guilty". Jessica and other jurors recall the evidence, as more and more jurors switch from "not guilty due to self defense" and come to a realization as to what actually occurred the night of the murder.

The 1986 Hindi film Ek Ruka Hua Faisla ("a pending decision") and 2012 Kannada film Dashamukha ("ten faces") are Indian remakes of the film, with almost identical storylines. The former has been adapted as another Indian Bengali film Shotyi Bole Shotyi Kichhu Nei which was released in January 2025.

Season 1, episode 17a of the Nickelodeon cartoon Hey Arnold! (1996) is a parody of 12 Angry Men. In the episode, titled "False Alarm", Eugene is suspected and accused of pulling the fire alarm, and a student jury is assembled to vote on the verdict, but Arnold is the only one who believes Eugene is innocent. He has to convince the rest of his classmates that Eugene is not guilty of the crime. In this adaptation, it is proven that Eugene was not the criminal but Curly a member of the student "jury" is the actual perpetrator due to the latter's reaction to the former's use of the Winkyland pencil (chewing on the eraser and intense sharpening).

In 1997, a television remake of the film under the same title was directed by William Friedkin and produced by Metro-Goldwyn-Mayer. In the newer version, the judge is a woman, four of the jurors are black, and the ninth juror is not the only senior citizen, but the overall plot remains intact. Modernizations include not smoking in the jury room, changes in references to pop culture and sports figures and income, references to execution by lethal injection as opposed to the electric chair, more race-related dialogue, and casual profanity.

A first season episode of The Dead Zone titled "Unreasonable Doubt" was an homage to 12 Angry Men with the main character, Johnny Smith, as the sole juror insisting on a not guilty verdict during a murder trial. He uses his psychic visions to point to actual evidence that eventually convinces the rest of the jurors to change their votes. The episode features a number of references to the movie, including one juror who would rather be seeing a baseball game, a juror who has a cold and the juror with the most vehement guilty verdict who is motivated by his own family tragedy.

The detective drama television show Veronica Mars, which like the film includes the theme of class issues, featured a 2005 episode, "One Angry Veronica", in which the title character is selected for jury duty. The episode flips the film's format and depicts one holdout convincing the jury to convict the privileged defendants of assault against a less well-off victim, despite their lawyers initially convincing 11 jury members of a not guilty verdict.

In a 2022 episode of The Equalizer called "Vox Populi", Aunt Vi is the only juror who doesn't automatically assume that the black male defendant is obviously guilty of the rape and murder of a white woman. As McCall works the case outside of the courtroom, Vi challenges the evidence and assumptions of the prosecution's narrative with the other jurors.

Russian director Nikita Mikhalkov also made a 2007 Academy Award-nominated adaptation, 12, featuring a Chechen teen on trial in Moscow.

A 2015 Chinese adaptation, 12 Citizens, follows the plot of the original 1957 American film, while including characters reflecting contemporary Beijing society, including a cab driver, guard, businessman, policeman, a retiree persecuted in a 1950s political movement, and others.

Juror 8 is a 2019 South Korean adaptation, directed by Hong Seung-wan.

The film has also been subject to parody. In 2015, the Comedy Central TV series Inside Amy Schumer aired a half-hour parody of the film titled "12 Angry Men Inside Amy Schumer".

The film was also parodied in the BBC Television comedy Hancock's Half Hour, starring Tony Hancock and Sid James, and written by Ray Galton and Alan Simpson, in the episode broadcast on October 16, 1959. Family Guy paid tribute to the film with its Season 11 episode titled "12 and a Half Angry Men", and King of the Hill acknowledged the film with their parody "Nine Pretty Darn Angry Men" in season 3.

The American adult animated sitcom Krapopolis also parodied the film in the fifth episode of its first season, titled "12 Angry Goat Herders". In it, Tyrannis invents the court system after Shlub is accused of eating the goats of the goat farmers. Tyrannis represented Shlub while the goat farmers were represented by Brenda the Sphinx.

The American thriller drama series Yellowjackets paid tribute to the film in the fourth episode of its third season, titled 12 Angry Girls and 1 Drunk Travis. In the episode, a kangaroo court is established in the attempt to convict the team's coach of attempted murder, on the basis of reasonable doubt.

== See also ==
- Adaptations of Twelve Angry Men
- Perfect Strangers (1950 film), an earlier film about a sequestered jury in a murder trial with a jury member who advocates for a presumption of innocence
- Twelve Angry Men (Studio One), teleplay source material
- List of American films of 1957
- List of films voted the best

== Sources ==
- Cunningham, Frank R. (2014). Sidney Lumet: Film and Literary Vision. The University Press of Kentucky. ISBN 978-0-81315-826-6.
- Fonda, Henry (November 1981). Fonda: My Life as Told to Howard Teichmann. New American Library. ISBN 978-0-45300-402-2.
- McKinney, Devin (2012). The Man Who Saw a Ghost: The Life and Work of Henry Fonda. Thorndike Press. ISBN 978-1-41045-622-9.
- Munyan, Russ, ed. (2000). Readings on Twelve Angry Men. Greenhaven Press. ISBN 978-0-73770-313-9.
- Rose, Reginald (1956). "Author's Commentary on Twelve Angry Men". Six Television Plays. Simon and Schuster.
- Rosenzweig, Phil (2021). Reginald Rose and the Journey of 12 Angry Men. Fordham University Press. ISBN 978-0-82329-776-4.
- Spiegel, Maura (December 2019). Sidney Lumet: A Life. St. Martin's Press. ISBN 978-1-25003-014-6.
