= Oliver Emert =

American set decorator

- Born: December 9, 1902; Los Angeles, California
- Died: August 13, 1975 (aged 72); Oxnard, California
- Occupation: Set decorator
- Years active: 1945-1969

Oliver Emert (December 9, 1902 – August 13, 1975) was an American set decorator. He won an Academy Award in the category Best Art Direction for the film To Kill a Mockingbird.

== Selected filmography ==
- Abbott and Costello Meet Frankenstein (1948)
- Operation Petticoat (1959)
- To Kill a Mockingbird (1962)
- The Ghost and Mr. Chicken (1966)
