= AFI's 100 Years of Film Scores =

2005 list of top 25 film scores in US cinema

AFI 100 Years... series
- 1998: 100 Movies
- 1999: 100 Stars
- 2000: 100 Laughs
- 2001: 100 Thrills
- 2002: 100 Passions
- 2003: 100 Heroes & Villains
- 2004: 100 Songs
- 2005: 100 Movie Quotes
- 2005: 25 Scores
- 2006: 100 Cheers
- 2006: 25 Musicals
- 2007: 100 Movies (Updated)
- 2008: AFI's 10 Top 10

Part of the AFI 100 Years... series, AFI's 100 Years of Film Scores is a list of the top 25 film scores in American cinema. The list was unveiled by the American Film Institute in 2005.

John Williams has the most scores in the top 25, with three: E.T. the Extra-Terrestrial, Jaws, and the top choice, Star Wars. Elmer Bernstein, Jerry Goldsmith, Bernard Herrmann, and Max Steiner each have two scores listed.

#	Film title	Year	Studio	Composer
1	Star Wars	1977	20th Century Fox, Lucasfilm Ltd.	John Williams
2	Gone with the Wind	1939	MGM, Selznick International	Max Steiner
3	Lawrence of Arabia	1962	Columbia, Horizon Pictures	Maurice Jarre
4	Psycho	1960	Paramount	Bernard Herrmann
5	The Godfather	1972	Paramount	Nino Rota
6	Jaws	1975	Universal, Zanuck/Brown Company	John Williams
7	Laura	1944	20th Century Fox	David Raksin
8	The Magnificent Seven	1960	United Artists, Mirisch Company	Elmer Bernstein
9	Chinatown	1974	Paramount	Jerry Goldsmith
10	High Noon	1952	United Artists, Stanley Kramer Productions	Dimitri Tiomkin
11	The Adventures of Robin Hood	1938	Warner Bros.	Erich Wolfgang Korngold
12	Vertigo	1958	Paramount	Bernard Herrmann
13	King Kong	1933	RKO	Max Steiner
14	E.T. the Extra-Terrestrial	1982	Universal	John Williams
15	Out of Africa	1985	Universal, Mirage Enterprises	John Barry
16	Sunset Boulevard	1950	Paramount	Franz Waxman
17	To Kill a Mockingbird	1962	Universal	Elmer Bernstein
18	Planet of the Apes	1968	20th Century Fox	Jerry Goldsmith
19	A Streetcar Named Desire	1951	Warner Bros.	Alex North
20	The Pink Panther	1963	United Artists, Mirisch Company	Henry Mancini
21	Ben-Hur	1959	MGM	Miklós Rózsa
22	On the Waterfront	1954	Columbia, Horizon Pictures	Leonard Bernstein
23	The Mission	1986	Warner Bros., Goldcrest Films	Ennio Morricone
24	On Golden Pond	1981	Universal, ITC Entertainment	Dave Grusin
25	How the West Was Won	1963	MGM, Cinerama Releasing	Alfred Newman
