= AFI's Greatest Movie Musicals =

List of the top musicals in American cinema

AFI 100 Years... series
- 1998: 100 Movies
- 1999: 100 Stars
- 2000: 100 Laughs
- 2001: 100 Thrills
- 2002: 100 Passions
- 2003: 100 Heroes & Villains
- 2004: 100 Songs
- 2005: 100 Movie Quotes
- 2005: 25 Scores
- 2006: 100 Cheers
- 2006: 25 Musicals
- 2007: 100 Movies (Updated)
- 2008: AFI's 10 Top 10

Part of the AFI 100 Years... series, AFI's Greatest Movie Musicals is a list of the top musicals in American cinema. The list was unveiled by the American Film Institute at the Hollywood Bowl on September 3, 2006. Unlike most of the previous lists, it only includes 25 winners and was not presented in a televised program.

== The list ==
#	Film	Year	Director	Studio
1	Singin' in the Rain	1952	Gene Kelly, Stanley Donen	MGM
2	West Side Story	1961	Robert Wise, Jerome Robbins	United Artists
3	The Wizard of Oz	1939	Victor Fleming	MGM
4	The Sound of Music	1965	Robert Wise	20th Century Fox
5	Cabaret	1972	Bob Fosse	Allied Artists
6	Mary Poppins	1964	Robert Stevenson	Disney
7	A Star Is Born	1954	George Cukor	Warner Bros.
8	My Fair Lady	1964	George Cukor	Warner Bros.
9	An American in Paris	1951	Vincente Minnelli	MGM
10	Meet Me in St. Louis	1944	Vincente Minnelli	MGM
11	The King and I	1956	Walter Lang	20th Century Fox
12	Chicago	2002	Rob Marshall	Miramax
13	42nd Street	1933	Lloyd Bacon	Warner Bros.
14	All That Jazz	1979	Bob Fosse	20th Century Fox
15	Top Hat	1935	Mark Sandrich	RKO
16	Funny Girl	1968	William Wyler	Columbia
17	The Band Wagon	1953	Vincente Minnelli	MGM
18	Yankee Doodle Dandy	1942	Michael Curtiz	Warner Bros.
19	On the Town	1949	Gene Kelly, Stanley Donen	MGM
20	Grease	1978	Randal Kleiser	Paramount
21	Seven Brides for Seven Brothers	1954	Stanley Donen	MGM
22	Beauty and the Beast	1991	Gary Trousdale, Kirk Wise	Disney
23	Guys and Dolls	1955	Joseph L. Mankiewicz	MGM
24	Show Boat	1936	James Whale	Universal
25	Moulin Rouge!	2001	Baz Luhrmann	20th Century Fox
