= AFI's 100 Years...100 Thrills =

AFI 100 Years... series
- 1998: 100 Movies
- 1999: 100 Stars
- 2000: 100 Laughs
- 2001: 100 Thrills
- 2002: 100 Passions
- 2003: 100 Heroes & Villains
- 2004: 100 Songs
- 2005: 100 Movie Quotes
- 2005: 25 Scores
- 2006: 100 Cheers
- 2006: 25 Musicals
- 2007: 100 Movies (Updated)
- 2008: AFI's 10 Top 10

Part of the AFI 100 Years... series, AFI's 100 Years...100 Thrills is a list of the top 100 most exciting movies in American cinema. The list was unveiled by the American Film Institute on June 12, 2001, during a CBS special hosted by Harrison Ford.

Nine Alfred Hitchcock films made the list, making "the master of suspense" the most represented director.

== List of films ==
#	Film	Director	Year
1	Psycho	Alfred Hitchcock	1960
2	Jaws	Steven Spielberg	1975
3	The Exorcist	William Friedkin	1973
4	North by Northwest	Alfred Hitchcock	1959
5	The Silence of the Lambs	Jonathan Demme	1991
6	Alien	Ridley Scott	1979
7	The Birds	Alfred Hitchcock	1963
8	The French Connection	William Friedkin	1971
9	Rosemary's Baby	Roman Polanski	1968
10	Raiders of the Lost Ark	Steven Spielberg	1981
11	The Godfather	Francis Ford Coppola	1972
12	King Kong	Merian C. Cooper	1933
13	Bonnie and Clyde	Arthur Penn	1967
14	Rear Window	Alfred Hitchcock	1954
15	Deliverance	John Boorman	1972
16	Chinatown	Roman Polanski	1974
17	The Manchurian Candidate	John Frankenheimer	1962
18	Vertigo	Alfred Hitchcock	1958
19	The Great Escape	John Sturges	1963
20	High Noon	Fred Zinnemann	1952
21	A Clockwork Orange	Stanley Kubrick	1971
22	Taxi Driver	Martin Scorsese	1976
23	Lawrence of Arabia	David Lean	1962
24	Double Indemnity	Billy Wilder	1944
25	Titanic	James Cameron	1997
26	The Maltese Falcon	John Huston	1941
27	Star Wars	George Lucas	1977
28	Fatal Attraction	Adrian Lyne	1987
29	The Shining	Stanley Kubrick	1980
30	The Deer Hunter	Michael Cimino	1978
31	Close Encounters of the Third Kind	Steven Spielberg	1977
32	Strangers on a Train	Alfred Hitchcock	1951
33	The Fugitive	Andrew Davis	1993
34	The Night of the Hunter	Charles Laughton	1955
35	Jurassic Park	Steven Spielberg	1993
36	Bullitt	Peter Yates	1968
37	Casablanca	Michael Curtiz	1942
38	Notorious	Alfred Hitchcock	1946
39	Die Hard	John McTiernan	1988
40	2001: A Space Odyssey	Stanley Kubrick	1968
41	Dirty Harry	Don Siegel	1971
42	The Terminator	James Cameron	1984
43	The Wizard of Oz	Victor Fleming	1939
44	E.T. the Extra-Terrestrial	Steven Spielberg	1982
45	Saving Private Ryan	Steven Spielberg	1998
46	Carrie	Brian De Palma	1976
47	Invasion of the Body Snatchers	Don Siegel	1956
48	Dial M for Murder	Alfred Hitchcock	1954
49	Ben-Hur	William Wyler	1959
50	Marathon Man	John Schlesinger	1976
51	Raging Bull	Martin Scorsese	1980
52	Rocky	John G. Avildsen	1976
53	Pulp Fiction	Quentin Tarantino	1994
54	Butch Cassidy and the Sundance Kid	George Roy Hill	1969
55	Wait Until Dark	Terence Young	1967
56	Frankenstein	James Whale	1931
57	All the President's Men	Alan J. Pakula	1976
58	The Bridge on the River Kwai	David Lean	1957
59	Planet of the Apes	Franklin J. Schaffner	1968
60	The Sixth Sense	M. Night Shyamalan	1999
61	Cape Fear	J. Lee Thompson	1962
62	Spartacus	Stanley Kubrick	1960
63	What Ever Happened to Baby Jane?	Robert Aldrich	1962
64	Touch of Evil	Orson Welles	1958
65	The Dirty Dozen	Robert Aldrich	1967
66	The Matrix	The Wachowskis	1999
67	The Treasure of the Sierra Madre	John Huston	1948
68	Halloween	John Carpenter	1978
69	The Wild Bunch	Sam Peckinpah	1969
70	Dog Day Afternoon	Sidney Lumet	1975
71	Goldfinger	Guy Hamilton	1964
72	Platoon	Oliver Stone	1986
73	Laura	Otto Preminger	1944
74	Blade Runner	Ridley Scott	1982
75	The Third Man	Carol Reed	1949
76	Thelma & Louise	Ridley Scott	1991
77	Terminator 2: Judgment Day	James Cameron	1991
78	Gaslight	George Cukor	1944
79	The Magnificent Seven	John Sturges	1960
80	Rebecca	Alfred Hitchcock	1940
81	The Omen	Richard Donner	1976
82	The Day the Earth Stood Still	Robert Wise	1951
83	The Phantom of the Opera	Rupert Julian	1925
84	Poltergeist	Tobe Hooper	1982
85	Dracula	Tod Browning	1931
86	The Picture of Dorian Gray	Albert Lewin	1945
87	The Thing from Another World	Christian Nyby	1951
88	12 Angry Men	Sidney Lumet	1957
89	The Guns of Navarone	J. Lee Thompson	1961
90	The Poseidon Adventure	Ronald Neame	1972
91	Braveheart	Mel Gibson	1995
92	Body Heat	Lawrence Kasdan	1981
93	Night of the Living Dead	George A. Romero	1968
94	The China Syndrome	James Bridges	1979
95	Full Metal Jacket	Stanley Kubrick	1987
96	Blue Velvet	David Lynch	1986
97	Safety Last!	Fred C. Newmeyer, Sam Taylor	1923
98	Blood Simple	Joel Coen, Ethan Coen	1984
99	Speed	Jan de Bont	1994
100	The Adventures of Robin Hood	Michael Curtiz	1938

== Criteria ==
- Feature-Length Fiction Film: The film must be in narrative format, typically more than 60 minutes long.
- American Film: The film must be in the English language with significant creative and/or financial production elements from the United States.
- Thrills: Regardless of genre, the total adrenaline-inducing impact of a film’s artistry and craft must create an experience that engages our bodies as well as our minds.
- Legacy: Films whose "thrills" have enlivened and enriched America’s film heritage while continuing to inspire contemporary artists and audiences.
