= AFI's 100 Years...100 Cheers =

'Most inspiring movies' list by American Film Institute

AFI 100 Years... series
- 1998: 100 Movies
- 1999: 100 Stars
- 2000: 100 Laughs
- 2001: 100 Thrills
- 2002: 100 Passions
- 2003: 100 Heroes & Villains
- 2004: 100 Songs
- 2005: 100 Movie Quotes
- 2005: 25 Scores
- 2006: 100 Cheers
- 2006: 25 Musicals
- 2007: 100 Movies (Updated)
- 2008: AFI's 10 Top 10

100 Years... 100 Cheers: America's Most Inspiring Movies is a list of the most inspiring films as determined by the American Film Institute. It is part of the AFI 100 Years... series, which has been compiling lists of the greatest films of all time in various categories since 1998. It was unveiled on a three-hour prime time special on CBS television on June 14, 2006.

The films were selected by a jury of over 1,500 people involved in the film industry, who were polled in November 2005.

== The list ==
#	Movies	Director	Year
1	It's a Wonderful Life	Frank Capra	1946
2	To Kill a Mockingbird	Robert Mulligan	1962
3	Schindler's List	Steven Spielberg	1993
4	Rocky	John G. Avildsen	1976
5	Mr. Smith Goes to Washington	Frank Capra	1939
6	E.T. the Extra-Terrestrial	Steven Spielberg	1982
7	The Grapes of Wrath	John Ford	1940
8	Breaking Away	Peter Yates	1979
9	Miracle on 34th Street	George Seaton	1947
10	Saving Private Ryan	Steven Spielberg	1998
11	The Best Years of Our Lives	William Wyler	1946
12	Apollo 13	Ron Howard	1995
13	Hoosiers	David Anspaugh	1986
14	The Bridge on the River Kwai	David Lean	1957
15	The Miracle Worker	Arthur Penn	1962
16	Norma Rae	Martin Ritt	1979
17	One Flew Over the Cuckoo's Nest	Miloš Forman	1975
18	The Diary of Anne Frank	George Stevens	1959
19	The Right Stuff	Philip Kaufman	1983
20	Philadelphia	Jonathan Demme	1993
21	In the Heat of the Night	Norman Jewison	1967
22	The Pride of the Yankees	Sam Wood	1942
23	The Shawshank Redemption	Frank Darabont	1994
24	National Velvet	Clarence Brown	1944
25	Sullivan's Travels	Preston Sturges	1941
26	The Wizard of Oz	Victor Fleming	1939
27	High Noon	Fred Zinnemann	1952
28	Field of Dreams	Phil Alden Robinson	1989
29	Gandhi	Richard Attenborough	1982
30	Lawrence of Arabia	David Lean	1962
31	Glory	Edward Zwick	1989
32	Casablanca	Michael Curtiz	1942
33	City Lights	Charlie Chaplin	1931
34	All the President's Men	Alan J. Pakula	1976
35	Guess Who's Coming to Dinner	Stanley Kramer	1967
36	On the Waterfront	Elia Kazan	1954
37	Forrest Gump	Robert Zemeckis	1994
38	Pinocchio	Ben Sharpsteen; Hamilton Luske	1940
39	Star Wars	George Lucas	1977
40	Mrs. Miniver	William Wyler	1942
41	The Sound of Music	Robert Wise	1965
42	12 Angry Men	Sidney Lumet	1957
43	Gone with the Wind	Victor Fleming	1939
44	Spartacus	Stanley Kubrick	1960
45	On Golden Pond	Mark Rydell	1981
46	Lilies of the Field	Ralph Nelson	1963
47	2001: A Space Odyssey	Stanley Kubrick	1968
48	The African Queen	John Huston	1951
49	Meet John Doe	Frank Capra	1941
50	Seabiscuit	Gary Ross	2003
51	The Color Purple	Steven Spielberg	1985
52	Dead Poets Society	Peter Weir	1989
53	Shane	George Stevens	1953
54	Rudy	David Anspaugh	1993
55	The Defiant Ones	Stanley Kramer	1958
56	Ben-Hur	William Wyler	1959
57	Sergeant York	Howard Hawks	1941
58	Close Encounters of the Third Kind	Steven Spielberg	1977
59	Dances with Wolves	Kevin Costner	1990
60	The Killing Fields	Roland Joffé	1984
61	Sounder	Martin Ritt	1972
62	Braveheart	Mel Gibson	1995
63	Rain Man	Barry Levinson	1988
64	The Black Stallion	Carroll Ballard	1979
65	A Raisin in the Sun	Daniel Petrie	1961
66	Silkwood	Mike Nichols	1983
67	The Day the Earth Stood Still	Robert Wise	1951
68	An Officer and a Gentleman	Taylor Hackford	1982
69	The Spirit of St. Louis	Billy Wilder	1957
70	Coal Miner's Daughter	Michael Apted	1980
71	Cool Hand Luke	Stuart Rosenberg	1967
72	Dark Victory	Edmund Goulding	1939
73	Erin Brockovich	Steven Soderbergh	2000
74	Gunga Din	George Stevens	1939
75	The Verdict	Sidney Lumet	1982
76	Birdman of Alcatraz	John Frankenheimer	1962
77	Driving Miss Daisy	Bruce Beresford	1989
78	Thelma & Louise	Ridley Scott	1991
79	The Ten Commandments	Cecil B. DeMille	1956
80	Babe	Chris Noonan	1995
81	Boys Town	Norman Taurog	1938
82	Fiddler on the Roof	Norman Jewison	1971
83	Mr. Deeds Goes to Town	Frank Capra	1936
84	Serpico	Sidney Lumet	1973
85	What's Love Got to Do with It	Brian Gibson	1993
86	Stand and Deliver	Ramón Menéndez	1988
87	Working Girl	Mike Nichols	1988
88	Yankee Doodle Dandy	Michael Curtiz	1942
89	Harold and Maude	Hal Ashby	1971
90	Hotel Rwanda	Terry George	2004
91	The Paper Chase	James Bridges	1973
92	Fame	Alan Parker	1980
93	A Beautiful Mind	Ron Howard	2001
94	Captains Courageous	Victor Fleming	1937
95	Places in the Heart	Robert Benton	1984
96	Searching for Bobby Fischer	Steven Zaillian	1993
97	Madame Curie	Mervyn LeRoy	1943
98	The Karate Kid	John G. Avildsen	1984
99	Ray	Taylor Hackford	2004
100	Chariots of Fire	Hugh Hudson	1981

== Statistics ==
- Director with the most films: Steven Spielberg — 5 films on the list (Schindler’s List; E.T.; Saving Private Ryan; The Color Purple; Close Encounters of the Third Kind).
- Runner-up: Frank Capra — 4 films (It’s a Wonderful Life; Mr. Smith Goes to Washington; Meet John Doe; Mr. Deeds Goes to Town).
- Other directors with many films (3 each): William Wyler (The Best Years of Our Lives, Mrs. Miniver, Ben-Hur), Sidney Lumet, George Stevens, Victor Fleming — 3 films each on the list.
