= AFI's 100 Years...100 Laughs =

AFI 100 Years... series
- 1998: 100 Movies
- 1999: 100 Stars
- 2000: 100 Laughs
- 2001: 100 Thrills
- 2002: 100 Passions
- 2003: 100 Heroes & Villains
- 2004: 100 Songs
- 2005: 100 Movie Quotes
- 2005: 25 Scores
- 2006: 100 Cheers
- 2006: 25 Musicals
- 2007: 100 Movies (Updated)
- 2008: AFI's 10 Top 10

Part of the AFI 100 Years... series, AFI's 100 Years...100 Laughs is a list of the top 100 funny movies in American cinema. A wide variety of comedies, totalling 500 films, were nominated for the distinction; genres included slapstick, action comedy, screwball comedy, romantic comedy, satire, black comedy, musical comedy, comedy of manners, and comedy of errors. The list was unveiled by the American Film Institute on June 13, 2000.

On June 28, 2026, AFI reorganized the list and proclaimed Blazing Saddles the funniest movie of all time to celebrate the 100th birthday of its director, Mel Brooks, in reaction to Brooks' opinion that Blazing Saddles is funnier than Some Like It Hot, the original #1 film on the list.

== Criteria ==
According to the AFI, the criteria for nomination are:

- Feature-Length Fiction Film: The film must be in narrative format typically over 60 minutes in length;
- American Film: The film must be in the English language with significant creative and/or financial production elements from the United States;
- Funny: Regardless of genre, the total comedic impact of a film's elements that creates an experience greater than the sum of the smiles;
- Legacy: Laughs that echo across time, enriching America's film heritage and inspiring artists and audiences today.

== List of films ==
#	Movie	Year
1	Blazing Saddles (Note: Originally #6)	1974
2	Some Like It Hot (Note: Originally #1)	1959
3	Tootsie (Note: Originally #2)	1982
4	Dr. Strangelove (Note: Originally #3)	1964
5	Annie Hall (Note: Originally #4)	1977
6	Duck Soup (Note: Originally #5)	1933
7	M*A*S*H	1970
8	It Happened One Night	1934
9	The Graduate	1967
10	Airplane!	1980
11	The Producers	1967
12	A Night at the Opera	1935
13	Young Frankenstein	1974
14	Bringing Up Baby	1938
15	The Philadelphia Story	1940
16	Singin' in the Rain	1952
17	The Odd Couple	1968
18	The General	1927
19	His Girl Friday	1940
20	The Apartment	1960
21	A Fish Called Wanda	1988
22	Adam's Rib	1949
23	When Harry Met Sally...	1989
24	Born Yesterday	1950
25	The Gold Rush	1925
26	Being There	1979
27	There's Something About Mary	1998
28	Ghostbusters	1984
29	This Is Spinal Tap	1984
30	Arsenic and Old Lace	1944
31	Raising Arizona	1987
32	The Thin Man	1934
33	Modern Times	1936
34	Groundhog Day	1993
35	Harvey	1950
36	Animal House	1978
37	The Great Dictator	1940
38	City Lights	1931
39	Sullivan's Travels	1941
40	It's a Mad, Mad, Mad, Mad World	1963
41	Moonstruck	1987
42	Big	1988
43	American Graffiti	1973
44	My Man Godfrey	1936
45	Harold and Maude	1971
46	Manhattan	1979
47	Shampoo	1975
48	A Shot in the Dark	1964
49	To Be or Not to Be	1942
50	Cat Ballou	1965
51	The Seven Year Itch	1955
52	Ninotchka	1939
53	Arthur	1981
54	The Miracle of Morgan's Creek	1944
55	The Lady Eve	1941
56	Abbott and Costello Meet Frankenstein	1948
57	Diner	1982
58	It's a Gift	1934
59	A Day at the Races	1937
60	Topper	1937
61	What's Up, Doc?	1972
62	Sherlock Jr.	1924
63	Beverly Hills Cop	1984
64	Broadcast News	1987
65	Horse Feathers	1932
66	Take the Money and Run	1969
67	Mrs. Doubtfire	1993
68	The Awful Truth	1937
69	Bananas	1971
70	Mr. Deeds Goes to Town	1936
71	Caddyshack	1980
72	Mr. Blandings Builds His Dream House	1948
73	Monkey Business	1931
74	9 to 5	1980
75	She Done Him Wrong	1933
76	Victor/Victoria	1982
77	The Palm Beach Story	1942
78	Road to Morocco	1942
79	The Freshman	1925
80	Sleeper	1973
81	The Navigator	1924
82	Private Benjamin	1980
83	Father of the Bride	1950
84	Lost in America	1985
85	Dinner at Eight	1933
86	City Slickers	1991
87	Fast Times at Ridgemont High	1982
88	Beetlejuice	1988
89	The Jerk	1979
90	Woman of the Year	1942
91	The Heartbreak Kid	1972
92	Ball of Fire	1941
93	Fargo	1996
94	Auntie Mame	1958
95	Silver Streak	1976
96	Sons of the Desert	1933
97	Bull Durham	1988
98	The Court Jester	1956
99	The Nutty Professor	1963
100	Good Morning, Vietnam	1987
