= AFI's 100 Years...100 Movie Quotes =

List of culturally impactful quotations from American cinema

AFI 100 Years... series
- 1998: 100 Movies
- 1999: 100 Stars
- 2000: 100 Laughs
- 2001: 100 Thrills
- 2002: 100 Passions
- 2003: 100 Heroes & Villains
- 2004: 100 Songs
- 2005: 100 Movie Quotes
- 2005: 25 Scores
- 2006: 100 Cheers
- 2006: 25 Musicals
- 2007: 100 Movies (Updated)
- 2008: AFI's 10 Top 10

Part of the American Film Institute's 100 Years... series, AFI's 100 Years... 100 Movie Quotes is a list of the top 100 quotations in American cinema. The American Film Institute revealed the list on June 21, 2005, in a three-hour television program on CBS. The program was hosted by Pierce Brosnan and had commentary from many Hollywood actors and filmmakers. A jury consisting of 1,500 film artists, critics, and historians selected "Frankly, my dear, I don't give a damn", spoken by Clark Gable as Rhett Butler in the 1939 American Civil War epic Gone with the Wind, as the most memorable American movie quotation of all time.

== Criteria ==
Jurors were asked to consider the following criteria in making their selections:

- Movie quotation: A statement, phrase or brief exchange of dialogue spoken in an American film. (Note: AFI defines an American film as an English language motion picture with significant creative and/or financial production elements from the United States. Additionally, only quotations from feature-length American films released before January 1, 2004, were considered. AFI defines a feature-length film as a motion picture of narrative format that is typically over 60 minutes in length.) Lyrics from songs are not eligible.
- Cultural impact: Movie quotations that viewers use in their own lives and situations; circulating through popular culture, they become part of the national lexicon.
- Legacy: Movie quotations that viewers use to evoke the memory of a treasured film, thus ensuring and enlivening its historical legacy.

== The list ==
The table below reproduces the quotes as the AFI published them.

Rank	Quotation	Character	Actor/Actress	Film	Year
1	"Frankly, my dear, I don't give a damn."	Rhett Butler	Clark Gable	Gone with the Wind	1939
2	"I'm gonna make him an offer he can't refuse."	Vito Corleone	Marlon Brando	The Godfather	1972
3	"You don't understand! I coulda had class. I coulda been a contender. I could've been somebody, instead of a bum, which is what I am." (Note: Robert De Niro as Jake LaMotta repeats Brando's speech in Raging Bull.)	Terry Malloy	Marlon Brando	On the Waterfront	1954
4	"Toto, I've a feeling we're not in Kansas anymore." (Note: The ballot entry for this quote included the word "got", which was removed from the AFI web page at some point.)	Dorothy Gale	Judy Garland	The Wizard of Oz	1939
5	"Here's looking at you, kid."	Rick Blaine	Humphrey Bogart	Casablanca	1942
6	"Go ahead, make my day."	Harry Callahan	Clint Eastwood	Sudden Impact (Note: Often misattributed to Dirty Harry.)	1983
7	"All right, Mr. DeMille, I'm ready for my close-up."	Norma Desmond	Gloria Swanson	Sunset Boulevard	1950
8	"May the Force be with you."	Han Solo	Harrison Ford	Star Wars	1977
9	"Fasten your seatbelts. It's going to be a bumpy night."	Margo Channing	Bette Davis	All About Eve	1950
10	"You talkin' to me?"	Travis Bickle	Robert De Niro	Taxi Driver	1976
11	"What we've got here is failure to communicate." (Note: Paul Newman repeats the line later in the film, mocking the prison warden, though he says "a failure", rather than simply "failure". Also heard quoted in this form.)	Captain	Strother Martin	Cool Hand Luke	1967
12	"I love the smell of napalm in the morning."	Lt. Col. Bill Kilgore	Robert Duvall	Apocalypse Now	1979
13	"Love means never having to say you're sorry."	Jennifer Cavalleri, Oliver Barrett IV	Ali MacGraw; Ryan O'Neal	Love Story	1970
14	"The stuff that dreams are made of." (Note: This paraphrases a line from The Tempest by William Shakespeare: "We are such stuff as dreams are made on" (often misquoted as "made of"))	Sam Spade	Humphrey Bogart	The Maltese Falcon	1941
15	"E.T. phone home."	E.T.	Pat Welsh	E.T. the Extra-Terrestrial	1982
16	"They call me Mister Tibbs!"	Virgil Tibbs	Sidney Poitier	In the Heat of the Night	1967
17	"Rosebud."	Charles Foster Kane	Orson Welles	Citizen Kane	1941
18	"Made it, Ma! Top of the world!"	Arthur "Cody" Jarrett	James Cagney	White Heat	1949
19	"I'm as mad as hell, and I'm not going to take this anymore!"	Howard Beale	Peter Finch	Network	1976
20	"Louis, I think this is the beginning of a beautiful friendship."	Rick Blaine	Humphrey Bogart	Casablanca	1942
21	"A census taker once tried to test me. I ate his liver with some fava beans and a nice Chianti."	Hannibal Lecter	Anthony Hopkins	The Silence of the Lambs	1991
22	"Bond. James Bond."	James Bond	Sean Connery (Note: Also George Lazenby, Roger Moore, Timothy Dalton, Pierce Brosnan, and Daniel Craig.)	Dr. No (Note: Appears in some form in a total of 25 films; Dr. No, From Russia with Love, Goldfinger, Thunderball, You Only Live Twice, On Her Majesty's Secret Service, Diamonds Are Forever, Live and Let Die, The Man with the Golden Gun, The Spy Who Loved Me, Moonraker, For Your Eyes Only, Octopussy, A View to a Kill, The Living Daylights, Licence to Kill, GoldenEye, Tomorrow Never Dies, The World Is Not Enough, Die Another Day, Casino Royale, Quantum of Solace, Skyfall, Spectre, and No Time to Die.)	1962
23	"There's no place like home." (Note: According to The Annotated Wizard of Oz, "[L. Frank] Baum [who quotes the phrase in The Wonderful Wizard of Oz] appears to be playing with the famous sentiment of John Howard Payne's 1823 song, 'Home, Sweet Home' [the melody of which, by Sir Henry Bishop, is played over several repetitions of the line]: 'Be it ever so humble, there's no place like home.' ... Baum's irony was apparently lost on the makers of the famous movie. Arthur Freed, assistant to the producer Mervyn LeRoy, was responsible for making 'There's No Place Like Home' the theme of the 1939 MGM picture....He was adamant that Dorothy repeat 'There's No Place Like Home' when she clicks her heels together three times.'" Michael Patrick Hearn (Ed.), The Annotated Wizard of Oz, p. 77, n. 1.)	Dorothy Gale	Judy Garland	The Wizard of Oz	1939
24	"I am big! It's the pictures that got small."	Norma Desmond	Gloria Swanson	Sunset Boulevard	1950
25	"Show me the money!"	Rod Tidwell	Cuba Gooding Jr.	Jerry Maguire	1996
26	"Why don't you come up sometime and see me?" (Note: Mae West paraphrased the line in her next film, I'm No Angel, as "Come up and see me sometime". Hence the line in She Done Him Wrong is often misquoted as "Why don't you come up and see me sometime?")	Lady Lou	Mae West	She Done Him Wrong	1933
27	"I'm walkin' here! I'm walkin' here!" (Note: Sometimes claimed to be an ad lib.)	"Ratso" Rizzo	Dustin Hoffman	Midnight Cowboy	1969
28	"Play it, Sam. Play 'As Time Goes By.'" (Note: Often misquoted as "Play it again, Sam", including deliberately in the title of a 1972 Woody Allen film.)	Ilsa Lund	Ingrid Bergman	Casablanca	1942
29	"You can't handle the truth!"	Col. Nathan R. Jessup	Jack Nicholson	A Few Good Men	1992
30	"I want to be alone."	Grusinskaya	Greta Garbo	Grand Hotel	1932
31	"After all, tomorrow is another day!"	Scarlett O'Hara	Vivien Leigh	Gone with the Wind	1939
32	"Round up the usual suspects."	Capt. Louis Renault	Claude Rains	Casablanca	1942
33	"I'll have what she's having."	Customer	Estelle Reiner	When Harry Met Sally...	1989
34	"You know how to whistle, don't you, Steve? You just put your lips together and blow."	Marie "Slim" Browning	Lauren Bacall	To Have and Have Not	1944
35	"You're gonna need a bigger boat."	Martin Brody	Roy Scheider	Jaws	1975
36	"Badges? We ain't got no badges! We don't need no badges! I don't have to show you any stinking badges!" (Note: Popularly misquoted as "Badges? We don't need no stinking badges!", most likely from Blazing Saddles, in which the line is so worded.)	Gold Hat	Alfonso Bedoya	The Treasure of the Sierra Madre	1948
37	"I'll be back."	The Terminator	Arnold Schwarzenegger	The Terminator	1984
38	"Today, I consider myself the luckiest man on the face of the Earth." (Note: An actual quotation from Lou Gehrig's retirement speech.)	Lou Gehrig	Gary Cooper	The Pride of the Yankees	1942
39	"If you build it, he will come." (Note: Often misquoted as "If you build it, they will come.")	Shoeless Joe Jackson	Ray Liotta (voice)	Field of Dreams	1989
40	"My mama always said life was like a box of chocolates. You never know what you're gonna get."	Forrest Gump	Tom Hanks	Forrest Gump	1994
41	"We rob banks."	Clyde Barrow	Warren Beatty	Bonnie and Clyde	1967
42	"Plastics."	Mr. Maguire	Walter Brooke	The Graduate	1967
43	"We'll always have Paris."	Rick Blaine	Humphrey Bogart	Casablanca	1942
44	"I see dead people."	Cole Sear	Haley Joel Osment	The Sixth Sense	1999
45	"Stella! Hey, Stella!"	Stanley Kowalski	Marlon Brando	A Streetcar Named Desire	1951
46	"Oh, Jerry, don't let's ask for the moon. We have the stars."	Charlotte Vale	Bette Davis	Now, Voyager	1942
47	"Shane. Shane. Come back!"	Joey Starrett	Brandon deWilde	Shane	1953
48	"Well, nobody's perfect."	Osgood Fielding III	Joe E. Brown	Some Like It Hot	1959
49	"It's alive! It's alive!"	Henry Frankenstein	Colin Clive	Frankenstein	1931
50	"Houston, we have a problem." (Note: The line is based on an actual message from Apollo 13. Astronaut Swigert said "Houston, we've had a problem here," then Lovell repeated "Houston, we've had a problem".)	Jim Lovell	Tom Hanks	Apollo 13	1995
51	"You've got to ask yourself one question: 'Do I feel lucky?' Well, do ya, punk?" (Note: Clint Eastwood repeats the line near the end of the film, goading the Scorpio Killer, though he simply says "a question", rather than "one question".)	Harry Callahan	Clint Eastwood	Dirty Harry	1971
52	"You had me at 'hello.'"	Dorothy Boyd	Renée Zellweger	Jerry Maguire	1996
53	"One morning I shot an elephant in my pajamas. How he got in my pajamas, I don't know." (Note: Often misquoted as "How he got in my pajamas, I'll never know." The time frame also varies ("yesterday", "once", etc.).)	Capt. Geoffrey T. Spaulding	Groucho Marx	Animal Crackers	1930
54	"There's no crying in baseball!"	Jimmy Dugan	Tom Hanks	A League of Their Own	1992
55	"La-dee-da, la-dee-da."	Annie Hall	Diane Keaton	Annie Hall	1977
56	"A boy's best friend is his mother."	Norman Bates	Anthony Perkins	Psycho	1960
57	"Greed, for lack of a better word, is good." (Note: The scene from the film in which this line appears is also excerpted in the movie's trailer, but in the trailer the sequence is edited so that Gekko's line occurs as simply "Greed is good." This shorter version of the line has become more popular – and more widely quoted – than the fuller version.)	Gordon Gekko	Michael Douglas	Wall Street	1987
58	"Keep your friends close, but your enemies closer." (Note: This maxim is attributed to several military strategists, notably Sun-tzu, Chinese general.)	Michael Corleone	Al Pacino	The Godfather Part II	1974
59	"As God is my witness, I'll never be hungry again."	Scarlett O'Hara	Vivien Leigh	Gone with the Wind	1939
60	"Well, here's another nice mess you've gotten me into!" (Note: Often misquoted as "Well, here's another fine mess you've gotten me into!", first quoted in The Laurel-Hardy Murder Case (1930))	Oliver	Oliver Hardy	Sons of the Desert	1933
61	"Say 'hello' to my little friend!"	Tony Montana	Al Pacino	Scarface	1983
62	"What a dump." (Note: Although occurring in the 1949 film, this line did not become a widespread catchphrase until after the 1961 premiere of Edward Albee's play Who's Afraid of Virginia Woolf?. In the opening scene of that play, Martha quotes this line and then (since she has apparently forgotten) she asks George which of Bette Davis's films it is from.)	Rosa Moline	Bette Davis	Beyond the Forest	1949
63	"Mrs. Robinson, you're trying to seduce me. Aren't you?"	Benjamin Braddock	Dustin Hoffman	The Graduate	1967
64	"Gentlemen, you can't fight in here! This is the War Room!"	President Merkin Muffley	Peter Sellers	Dr. Strangelove	1964
65	"Elementary, my dear Watson." (Note: This line, which does not appear in any of Arthur Conan Doyle's stories, was first said onscreen in The Return of Sherlock Holmes. The line's first occurrence is in the stage play Sherlock Holmes, written entirely by William Gillette with Doyle's approval, for which Gilette listed Doyle as co-author.)	Sherlock Holmes	Basil Rathbone	The Adventures of Sherlock Holmes	1939
66	"Take your stinking paws off me, you damned dirty ape."	George Taylor	Charlton Heston	Planet of the Apes	1968
67	"Of all the gin joints in all the towns in all the world, she walks into mine."	Rick Blaine	Humphrey Bogart	Casablanca	1942
68	"Here's Johnny!" (Note: An ad-lib. The line is Ed McMahon's signature introduction of Johnny Carson on The Tonight Show.)	Jack Torrance	Jack Nicholson	The Shining	1980
69	"They're here!"	Carol Anne Freeling	Heather O'Rourke	Poltergeist	1982
70	"Is it safe?"	Dr. Christian Szell	Laurence Olivier	Marathon Man	1976
71	"Wait a minute, wait a minute. You ain't heard nothin' yet!" (Note: A longtime Jolson catchphrase also heard, with variations, in his earlier Vitaphone short film A Plantation Act (1926).)	Jakie Rabinowitz/Jack Robin	Al Jolson	The Jazz Singer	1927
72	"No wire hangers, ever!" (Note: Usually misquoted as: "No more wire hangers, ever!")	Joan Crawford	Faye Dunaway	Mommie Dearest	1981
73	"Mother of mercy, is this the end of Rico?"	Rico Bandello	Edward G. Robinson	Little Caesar	1931
74	"Forget it, Jake, it's Chinatown."	Lawrence Walsh	Joe Mantell	Chinatown	1974
75	"I have always depended on the kindness of strangers."	Blanche DuBois	Vivien Leigh	A Streetcar Named Desire	1951
76	"Hasta la vista, baby."	The Terminator	Arnold Schwarzenegger	Terminator 2: Judgment Day	1991
77	"Soylent Green is people!"	Det. Robert Thorn	Charlton Heston	Soylent Green	1973
78	"Open the pod bay doors, HAL."	Dave Bowman	Keir Dullea	2001: A Space Odyssey	1968
79	Striker: "Surely you can't be serious." Rumack: "I am serious ... and don't call me Shirley."	Ted Striker and Dr. Rumack	Robert Hays and Leslie Nielsen	Airplane!	1980
80	"Yo, Adrian!"	Rocky Balboa	Sylvester Stallone	Rocky	1976
81	"Hello, gorgeous."	Fanny Brice	Barbra Streisand	Funny Girl	1968
82	"Toga! Toga!"	John "Bluto" Blutarsky	John Belushi	National Lampoon's Animal House	1978
83	"Listen to them. Children of the night. What music they make."	Count Dracula	Bela Lugosi	Dracula	1931
84	"Oh, no, it wasn't the airplanes. It was Beauty killed the Beast." (Note: Frequently heard as "...Twas beauty that killed the beast")	Carl Denham	Robert Armstrong	King Kong	1933
85	"My precious."	Gollum	Andy Serkis	The Lord of the Rings: The Two Towers	2002
86	"Attica! Attica!"	Sonny Wortzik	Al Pacino	Dog Day Afternoon	1975
87	"Sawyer, you're going out a youngster, but you've got to come back a star!"	Julian Marsh	Warner Baxter	42nd Street	1933
88	"Listen to me, mister. You're my knight in shining armor. Don't you forget it. You're going to get back on that horse, and I'm going to be right behind you, holding on tight, and away we're gonna go, go, go!"	Ethel Thayer	Katharine Hepburn	On Golden Pond	1981
89	"Tell 'em to go out there with all they got and win just one for the Gipper."	George Gipp	Ronald Reagan	Knute Rockne, All American	1940
90	"A martini. Shaken, not stirred." (Note: Later, "Vodka Martini, shaken, not stirred." In the film You Only Live Twice, accidentally "Stirred, not shaken.")	James Bond	Sean Connery	Goldfinger (Note: Appeared in multiple other films.)	1964
91	"Who's on first?" (Note: Although "Who's on first" appeared in numerous other Abbott and Costello films prior to 1945, the one featured in The Naughty Nineties is considered the best rendition of the sketch.)	Dexter	Bud Abbott	The Naughty Nineties	1945
92	"Cinderella story. Outta nowhere. A former greenskeeper, now, about to become the Masters champion. It looks like a mirac...It's in the hole! It's in the hole! It's in the hole!"	Carl Spackler	Bill Murray	Caddyshack	1980
93	"Life is a banquet, and most poor suckers are starving to death!"	Mame Dennis	Rosalind Russell	Auntie Mame	1958
94	"I feel the need—the need for speed!"	Pete Mitchell and Nick Bradshaw	Tom Cruise and Anthony Edwards	Top Gun	1986
95	"Carpe diem. Seize the day, boys. Make your lives extraordinary."	John Keating	Robin Williams	Dead Poets Society	1989
96	"Snap out of it!"	Loretta Castorini	Cher	Moonstruck	1987
97	"My mother thanks you. My father thanks you. My sister thanks you. And I thank you."	George M. Cohan	James Cagney	Yankee Doodle Dandy	1942
98	"Nobody puts Baby in a corner."	Johnny Castle	Patrick Swayze	Dirty Dancing	1987
99	"I'll get you, my pretty, and your little dog too!"	Wicked Witch of the West	Margaret Hamilton	The Wizard of Oz	1939
100	"I'm the king of the world!"	Jack Dawson	Leonardo DiCaprio	Titanic	1997

== By the numbers ==
With six quotes, Casablanca is the most represented film. Gone with the Wind and The Wizard of Oz are tied for second, with three each. Sunset Boulevard, A Streetcar Named Desire, The Graduate, and Jerry Maguire each have two quotes.

Rick Blaine (Casablanca) is the character with the most quotes (four); Dorothy Gale (The Wizard of Oz), Harry Callahan (Dirty Harry and Sudden Impact), James Bond (Dr. No and Goldfinger), Norma Desmond (Sunset Boulevard), Scarlett O'Hara (Gone with the Wind), and The Terminator (The Terminator and Terminator 2: Judgment Day) have two quotes each.

With five, Humphrey Bogart is the actor with the most quotes (four from Casablanca and one from The Maltese Falcon). Al Pacino, Bette Davis, Marlon Brando, Tom Hanks, and Vivien Leigh have three apiece, while Jack Nicholson, Judy Garland, Gloria Swanson, Dustin Hoffman, Clint Eastwood, Charlton Heston, James Cagney, and Arnold Schwarzenegger have two each. Sean Connery also has two entries, but his two quotes are shared with five other actors. As well as the five quotes spoken by Bogart, two other quotes on the list (from The Treasure of the Sierra Madre and To Have and Have Not) were spoken to him, by Alfonso Bedoya and Lauren Bacall, respectively. Further, "Round up the usual suspects." was spoken in his presence and for his character's benefit by Claude Rains, and "Play it, Sam." is often mistakenly attributed to him; he actually said, "You played it for her, you can play it for me. ... If she can stand it, I can! Play it!"

The line "My precious", from The Lord of the Rings: The Two Towers, is the only quote from a movie released in the 21st century and the 3rd millennium. It is also the only one by a CGI character.

Quotations by decade:

- 1920s: 1
- 1930s: 16
- 1940s: 17
- 1950s: 9
- 1960s: 13
- 1970s: 16
- 1980s: 17
- 1990s: 10
- 2000s: 1

Top years:

- 1942: 9
- 1939: 7
- 1967: 5
- 1933: 4
- 1976: 4

== Misquotes ==
A number of the entries are frequently misquoted. The following have become well-known but are incorrect:

- #4: "Toto, I don't think we're in Kansas anymore."
- #7: "I'm ready for my closeup, Mr. DeMille."
- #9: "Fasten your seatbelts. It's going to be a bumpy ride."
- #26: "Why don't you come up and see me sometime?"
- #28: "Play it again, Sam."
- #35: "We're gonna need a bigger boat."
- #36: "Badges? We don't need no stinkin' badges!"
- #39: "If you build it, they will come."
- #40: "Life is like a box of chocolates."
- #47: "Come back, Shane."
- #50: "Houston, we've got a problem."
- #51: "Do you feel lucky, punk?"
- #57: "Greed is good."
- #63: "Mrs. Robinson, are you trying to seduce me?"

== Real-life sources ==
A number of the quotes are drawn from real-world events and sources:

Rank	Quotation	Film	Source
38	"Today, I consider myself the luckiest man on the face of the Earth."	The Pride of the Yankees	An actual quotation from Lou Gehrig's retirement speech
50	"Houston, we have a problem."	Apollo 13	The actual message from the Apollo 13 mission was "Houston, we've had a problem"
68	"Here's Johnny!"	The Shining	The line is Ed McMahon's signature introduction of Johnny Carson on The Tonight Show.
97	"My mother thanks you. My father thanks you. My sister thanks you. And I thank you."	Yankee Doodle Dandy	George M. Cohan's curtain speech

== Opening and closing lines ==
Only "Rosebud," from Citizen Kane, and "Hello, gorgeous," from Funny Girl, are the opening lines of a film. Twelve quotes are closing lines:

Rank	Quotation	Character	Actor/Actress	Film	Year
7	"All right, Mr. DeMille, I'm ready for my close-up."	Norma Desmond	Gloria Swanson	Sunset Boulevard	1950
14	"The stuff that dreams are made of."	Sam Spade	Humphrey Bogart	The Maltese Falcon	1941
20	"Louis, I think this is the beginning of a beautiful friendship."	Rick Blaine	Humphrey Bogart	Casablanca	1942
23	"There's no place like home." (also said earlier in the movie)	Dorothy Gale	Judy Garland	The Wizard of Oz	1939
31	"After all, tomorrow is another day!"	Scarlett O'Hara	Vivien Leigh	Gone with the Wind	1939
46	"Oh, Jerry, don't let's ask for the moon. We have the stars."	Charlotte Vale	Bette Davis	Now, Voyager	1942
47	"Shane. Shane. Come back!"	Joey Starrett	Brandon deWilde	Shane	1953
48	"Well, nobody's perfect."	Osgood Fielding III	Joe E. Brown	Some Like It Hot	1959
73	"Mother of mercy, is this the end of Rico?"	Rico Bandello	Edward G. Robinson	Little Caesar	1931
74	"Forget it, Jake, it's Chinatown."	Lawrence Walsh	Joe Mantell	Chinatown	1974
77	"Soylent Green is people!"	Det. Robert Thorn	Charlton Heston	Soylent Green	1973
84	"Oh, no, it wasn't the airplanes. It was Beauty killed the Beast."	Carl Denham	Robert Armstrong	King Kong	1933

== See also ==
- Catchphrase
- List of catchphrases in American and British mass media
