= AFI's 100 Years...100 Movies (10th Anniversary Edition) =

Updated list of the best 100 American films

AFI 100 Years... series
- 1998: 100 Movies
- 1999: 100 Stars
- 2000: 100 Laughs
- 2001: 100 Thrills
- 2002: 100 Passions
- 2003: 100 Heroes & Villains
- 2004: 100 Songs
- 2005: 100 Movie Quotes
- 2005: 25 Scores
- 2006: 100 Cheers
- 2006: 25 Musicals
- 2007: 100 Movies (Updated)
- 2008: AFI's 10 Top 10

AFI's 100 Years...100 Movies – 10th Anniversary Edition was the 2007 updated version of AFI's 100 Years...100 Movies. The original list was unveiled in 1998.

== Criteria ==
AFI asked jurors to consider the following criteria in their selection process:

- Feature length: Narrative format typically over 60 minutes long.
- American film: English language, with significant creative and/or financial production from the United States. (A number of films on the list were British-made but financed by American studios; these include Lawrence of Arabia, The Bridge on the River Kwai, and A Clockwork Orange.)
- Critical recognition: Formal commendation in print, television, and digital media.
- Major award winner: Recognition from competitive events including awards from peer groups, critics, guilds, and major film festivals.
- Popularity over time: Includes success at the box office, television and cable airings, and DVD/VHS sales and rentals.
- Historical significance: A film's mark on the history of the moving image through visionary narrative devices, technical innovation or other groundbreaking achievements.
- Cultural impact: A film's mark on American society in matters of style and substance.

== List ==
Rank	10th anniversary list (2007)	Director	Year	Production companies	Change from 1998
1.	Citizen Kane	Orson Welles	1941	Mercury Productions, RKO Radio Pictures	Steady
2.	The Godfather	Francis Ford Coppola	1972	Paramount Pictures, Alfran Productions	▲1
3.	Casablanca	Michael Curtiz	1942	Warner Bros.	▼1
4.	Raging Bull	Martin Scorsese	1980	Chartoff-Winkler Productions	▲20
5.	Singin' in the Rain	Gene Kelly, Stanley Donen	1952	Metro-Goldwyn-Mayer	▲5
6.	Gone with the Wind	Victor Fleming	1939	Selznick International Pictures	▼2
7.	Lawrence of Arabia	David Lean	1962	Horizon Pictures	▼2
8.	Schindler's List	Steven Spielberg	1993	Amblin Entertainment	▲1
9.	Vertigo	Alfred Hitchcock	1958	Alfred J. Hitchcock Productions	▲52
10.	The Wizard of Oz	Victor Fleming	1939	Metro-Goldwyn-Mayer	▼4
11.	City Lights	Charlie Chaplin	1931	Charles Chaplin Productions	▲65
12.	The Searchers	John Ford	1956	C. V. Whitney Pictures	▲84
13.	Star Wars	George Lucas	1977	Lucasfilm	▲2
14.	Psycho	Alfred Hitchcock	1960	Shamley Productions	▲4
15.	2001: A Space Odyssey	Stanley Kubrick	1968	Metro-Goldwyn-Mayer	▲7
16.	Sunset Boulevard	Billy Wilder	1950	Paramount Pictures	▼4
17.	The Graduate	Mike Nichols	1967	Lawrence Turman	▼10
18.	The General	Buster Keaton, Clyde Bruckman	1926	Buster Keaton Productions	NEW
19.	On the Waterfront	Elia Kazan	1954	Horizon-American Pictures	▼11
20.	It's a Wonderful Life	Frank Capra	1946	Liberty Films	▼9
21.	Chinatown	Roman Polanski	1974	Long Road Productions	▼2
22.	Some Like It Hot	Billy Wilder	1959	Ashton Productions, The Mirisch Company	▼8
23.	The Grapes of Wrath	John Ford	1940	20th Century-Fox	▼2
24.	E.T. the Extra-Terrestrial	Steven Spielberg	1982	Universal Pictures, Amblin Entertainment	▲1
25.	To Kill a Mockingbird	Robert Mulligan	1962	Pakula-Mulligan Productions, Brentwood Productions	▲9
26.	Mr. Smith Goes to Washington	Frank Capra	1939	Columbia Pictures	▲3
27.	High Noon	Fred Zinnemann	1952	Stanley Kramer Productions	▲6
28.	All About Eve	Joseph L. Mankiewicz	1950	20th Century-Fox	▼12
29.	Double Indemnity	Billy Wilder	1944	Paramount Pictures	▲9
30.	Apocalypse Now	Francis Ford Coppola	1979	Omni Zoetrope	▼2
31.	The Maltese Falcon	John Huston	1941	Warner Bros.	▼8
32.	The Godfather Part II	Francis Ford Coppola	1974	The Coppola Company	Steady
33.	One Flew Over the Cuckoo's Nest	Miloš Forman	1975	Fantasy Films	▼13
34.	Snow White and the Seven Dwarfs	David Hand	1937	Walt Disney	▲15
35.	Annie Hall	Woody Allen	1977	United Artists	▼4
36.	The Bridge on the River Kwai	David Lean	1957	Horizon-American Pictures	▼23
37.	The Best Years of Our Lives	William Wyler	1946	Samuel Goldwyn Productions	Steady
38.	The Treasure of the Sierra Madre	John Huston	1948	Warner Bros.	▼8
39.	Dr. Strangelove	Stanley Kubrick	1964	Hawk Films, Polaris Productions	▼13
40.	The Sound of Music	Robert Wise	1965	Argyle Enterprises, 20th Century-Fox	▲15
41.	King Kong	Merian C. Cooper, Ernest B. Schoedsack	1933	RKO Radio Pictures	▲2
42.	Bonnie and Clyde	Arthur Penn	1967	Tatira-Hiller Productions	▼15
43.	Midnight Cowboy	John Schlesinger	1969	Jerome Hellman Productions	▼7
44.	The Philadelphia Story	George Cukor	1940	Metro-Goldwyn-Mayer	▲7
45.	Shane	George Stevens	1953	Paramount Pictures	▲24
46.	It Happened One Night	Frank Capra	1934	Columbia Pictures	▼11
47.	A Streetcar Named Desire	Elia Kazan	1951	Warner Bros., Charles K. Feldman Productions	▼2
48.	Rear Window	Alfred Hitchcock	1954	Paramount Pictures, Patron	▼6
49.	Intolerance	D.W. Griffith	1916	D.W. Griffith, Wark Producing	NEW
50.	The Lord of the Rings: The Fellowship of the Ring	Peter Jackson	2001	New Line Cinema, WingNut Films	NEW
51.	West Side Story	Jerome Robbins, Robert Wise	1961	Beta Productions, The Mirisch Company, Seven Arts Productions, B & P Enterprises	▼10
52.	Taxi Driver	Martin Scorsese	1976	B & P Enterprises, Italo-Judeo	▼5
53.	The Deer Hunter	Michael Cimino	1978	EMI	▲26
54.	M*A*S*H	Robert Altman	1970	Aspen Productions	▲2
55.	North by Northwest	Alfred Hitchcock	1959	Metro-Goldwyn-Mayer	▼15
56.	Jaws	Steven Spielberg	1975	Universal Pictures, Zanuck/Brown Company	▼8
57.	Rocky	John G. Avildsen	1976	Chartoff/Winkler Productions	▲21
58.	The Gold Rush	Charlie Chaplin	1925	Charles Chaplin Productions	▲16
59.	Nashville	Robert Altman	1975	ABC Entertainment	NEW
60.	Duck Soup	Leo McCarey	1933	Paramount Productions, Inc.	▲25
61.	Sullivan's Travels	Preston Sturges	1941	Paramount Pictures	NEW
62.	American Graffiti	George Lucas	1973	Coppola Co., Lucasfilm	▲15
63.	Cabaret	Bob Fosse	1972	ABC Pictures	NEW
64.	Network	Sidney Lumet	1976	Metro-Goldwyn-Mayer	▲2
65.	The African Queen	John Huston	1951	Horizon Enterprises, Romulus Films	▼48
66.	Raiders of the Lost Ark	Steven Spielberg	1981	Lucasfilm	▼6
67.	Who's Afraid of Virginia Woolf?	Mike Nichols	1966	Chenault Productions, Warner Bros.	NEW
68.	Unforgiven	Clint Eastwood	1992	The Malpaso Company	▲30
69.	Tootsie	Sydney Pollack	1982	Mirage Enterprises, Punch Productions, Columbia Pictures, Delphi Productions	▼7
70.	A Clockwork Orange	Stanley Kubrick	1971	Polaris Productions, Hawk Films	▼24
71.	Saving Private Ryan	Steven Spielberg	1998	Amblin Entertainment, Mutual Film Company	NEW
72.	The Shawshank Redemption	Frank Darabont	1994	Castle Rock Entertainment	NEW
73.	Butch Cassidy and the Sundance Kid	George Roy Hill	1969	Campanile Productions	▼23
74.	The Silence of the Lambs	Jonathan Demme	1991	Strong Heart Productions	▼9
75.	In the Heat of the Night	Norman Jewison	1967	The Mirisch Corporation	NEW
76.	Forrest Gump	Robert Zemeckis	1994	The Tisch Company	▼5
77.	All the President's Men	Alan J. Pakula	1976	Wildwood Enterprises	NEW
78.	Modern Times	Charlie Chaplin	1936	Charles Chaplin Film Corp.	▲3
79.	The Wild Bunch	Sam Peckinpah	1969	Phil Feldman Productions, Warner Bros.-Seven Arts	▲1
80.	The Apartment	Billy Wilder	1960	The Mirisch Company	▲13
81.	Spartacus	Stanley Kubrick	1960	Bryna Productions, Universal-International Pictures	NEW
82.	Sunrise: A Song of Two Humans	F. W. Murnau	1927	Fox Film	NEW
83.	Titanic	James Cameron	1997	Paramount Pictures, 20th Century-Fox, Lightstorm Entertainment	NEW
84.	Easy Rider	Dennis Hopper	1969	The Pando Company, Raybert Productions	▲4
85.	A Night at the Opera	Sam Wood	1935	Metro-Goldwyn-Mayer	NEW
86.	Platoon	Oliver Stone	1986	Hemdale Film Corporation	▼3
87.	12 Angry Men	Sidney Lumet	1957	Orion-Nova Productions	NEW
88.	Bringing Up Baby	Howard Hawks	1938	RKO Radio Pictures	▲9
89.	The Sixth Sense	M. Night Shyamalan	1999	Hollywood Pictures, Spyglass Entertainment, The Kennedy/Marshall Company	NEW
90.	Swing Time	George Stevens	1936	RKO Radio Pictures	NEW
91.	Sophie's Choice	Alan J. Pakula	1982	ITC Entertainment, Marble Arch Productions	NEW
92.	Goodfellas	Martin Scorsese	1990	Warner Bros., Irwin Winkler Productions	▲2
93.	The French Connection	William Friedkin	1971	D'Antoni Productions	▼23
94.	Pulp Fiction	Quentin Tarantino	1994	A Band Apart, Jersey Films	▲1
95.	The Last Picture Show	Peter Bogdanovich	1971	BBS Productions	NEW
96.	Do the Right Thing	Spike Lee	1989	40 Acres & A Mule Filmworks	NEW
97.	Blade Runner	Ridley Scott	1982	The Ladd Company, Sir Run Run Shaw	NEW
98.	Yankee Doodle Dandy	Michael Curtiz	1942	Warner Bros.	▲2
99.	Toy Story	John Lasseter	1995	Pixar, Walt Disney Pictures	NEW
100.	Ben-Hur	William Wyler	1959	Metro-Goldwyn-Mayer	▼28

=== Changes from the original list ===
The following films from the 1998 list were left off the 2007 list:

- 39. Doctor Zhivago (1965)
- 44. The Birth of a Nation (1915)
- 52. From Here to Eternity (1953)
- 53. Amadeus (1984)
- 54. All Quiet on the Western Front (1930)
- 57. The Third Man (1949)
- 58. Fantasia (1940)
- 59. Rebel Without a Cause (1955)
- 63. Stagecoach (1939)
- 64. Close Encounters of the Third Kind (1977)
- 67. The Manchurian Candidate (1962)
- 68. An American in Paris (1951)
- 73. Wuthering Heights (1939)
- 75. Dances with Wolves (1990)
- 82. Giant (1956)
- 84. Fargo (1996)
- 86. Mutiny on the Bounty (1935)
- 87. Frankenstein (1931)
- 89. Patton (1970)
- 90. The Jazz Singer (1927)
- 91. My Fair Lady (1964)
- 92. A Place in the Sun (1951)
- 99. Guess Who's Coming to Dinner (1967)

Added were:

- 18. The General (1926)
- 49. Intolerance (1916)
- 50. The Lord of the Rings: The Fellowship of the Ring (2001)
- 59. Nashville (1975)
- 61. Sullivan's Travels (1941)
- 63. Cabaret (1972)
- 67. Who's Afraid of Virginia Woolf? (1966)
- 71. Saving Private Ryan (1998)
- 72. The Shawshank Redemption (1994)
- 75. In the Heat of the Night (1967)
- 77. All the President's Men (1976)
- 81. Spartacus (1960)
- 82. Sunrise (1927)
- 83. Titanic (1997)
- 85. A Night at the Opera (1935)
- 87. 12 Angry Men (1957)
- 89. The Sixth Sense (1999)
- 90. Swing Time (1936)
- 91. Sophie's Choice (1982)
- 95. The Last Picture Show (1971)
- 96. Do the Right Thing (1989)
- 97. Blade Runner (1982)
- 99. Toy Story (1995)
- Of the 77 films that remained on the list, 36 improved their ranking, 38 saw their ranking decline, and three kept their positions: Citizen Kane, The Godfather Part II, and The Best Years of Our Lives.
- The Searchers had the highest increase in ranking, moving from #96 to #12. The greatest decrease without being dropped was The African Queen, which went from #17 to #65.
- The oldest film to be dropped was D.W. Griffith's The Birth of a Nation (1915), from #44. The oldest film to be added was Griffith's Intolerance (1916) (#49).
- The newest film removed is Fargo (1996), the newest added The Lord of the Rings: The Fellowship of the Ring (2001), which is also the only film on the list released after 1999.
- The highest-ranked addition was The General at #18. The highest-ranked removal was Doctor Zhivago (#39).
- Duck Soup, featuring the Marx Brothers, moved up 25 positions to #60. It was replaced at #85 by another film starring them, A Night at the Opera.
- Seventy-three of the films were nominated for the Academy Award for Best Picture. Twenty-eight won, including Sunrise (1927), which won the Academy Award for Unique and Artistic Production (an award that was only presented at the first ceremony). The original list has 75 Academy Awards Best Picture nominees and 33 winners.
- In the 2007 list, eight of the top ten films were nominated for the Academy Award for Best Picture, with five winning. In the original list, nine out of the top ten were nominees, and six won.
- Two animated films appear on each list. In 1998, Snow White and the Seven Dwarfs ranked at #49, and Fantasia at #58. Snow White moved up to #34 in 2007, while Fantasia was dropped, and Toy Story was added at #99. Three were produced by Walt Disney Productions, while Toy Story was a joint production of Walt Disney Studios and Pixar, making Toy Story the only Pixar film on either list.

== Most films by director ==
5

- Steven Spielberg. Spielberg also had five films on the original list, but not the same five. Close Encounters of the Third Kind was dropped and Saving Private Ryan added.

4

- Alfred Hitchcock
- Stanley Kubrick
- Billy Wilder

3

- Frank Capra
- Charlie Chaplin
- Francis Ford Coppola
- John Huston
- Martin Scorsese

2

- Robert Altman
- Michael Curtiz
- Victor Fleming
- John Ford
- Elia Kazan
- David Lean
- George Lucas
- Sidney Lumet
- Mike Nichols
- Alan J. Pakula
- George Stevens
- Robert Wise
- William Wyler

== Broadcast ==
This installment of the American Film Institute's (AFI) Emmy Award-winning AFI 100 Years... series counted down the movies in a three-hour television event airing on June 20, 2007, on CBS. It was hosted by Academy Award-winning actor Morgan Freeman. The program considered classic favorites and newly eligible films released from 1997 to 2005. The special was nominated for two Emmy Awards.

== See also ==
- AFI's 10 Top 10
- List of films considered the best
