= AFI's 10 Top 10 =

AFI 100 Years... series
- 1998: 100 Movies
- 1999: 100 Stars
- 2000: 100 Laughs
- 2001: 100 Thrills
- 2002: 100 Passions
- 2003: 100 Heroes & Villains
- 2004: 100 Songs
- 2005: 100 Movie Quotes
- 2005: 25 Scores
- 2006: 100 Cheers
- 2006: 25 Musicals
- 2007: 100 Movies (Updated)
- 2008: AFI's 10 Top 10

AFI's 10 Top 10 honors the ten greatest American films in ten classic film genres. Presented by the American Film Institute (AFI), the lists were unveiled on a television special broadcast by CBS on June 17, 2008. In the special, various actors and directors, among them Clint Eastwood, Quentin Tarantino, Kirk Douglas, Harrison Ford, Martin Scorsese, Steven Spielberg, George Lucas, Roman Polanski, and Jane Fonda, discussed their admiration for and personal contributions to the films cited.

The entire list of 500 nominated films is available on the American Film Institute website.

To date, this is the final program in AFI's countdown specials.

== Animation ==
AFI defines "animation" as a genre where the film's images are primarily created by computer or hand and the characters are voiced by actors. Nine of the films are Disney properties, including two collaborative works with Pixar; the non-Disney selection is DreamWorks Animation's Shrek.

#	Film	Year	Other Listings in AFI 100 Years... series
1	Snow White and the Seven Dwarfs	1937	AFI's 100 Years...100 Movies – #49; AFI's 100 Years...100 Heroes & Villains; The Queen – #10 Villain; AFI's 100 Years...100 Songs; 'Someday My Prince Will Come' – #19; AFI's 100 Years...100 Movies (10th Anniversary Edition) – #34
2	Pinocchio	1940	AFI's 100 Years...100 Songs; 'When You Wish Upon a Star' – #7; AFI's 100 Years...100 Cheers – #38
3	Bambi	1942	AFI's 100 Years...100 Heroes & Villains; Man – #20 Villain
4	The Lion King	1994	AFI's 100 Years...100 Songs; 'Hakuna Matata' – #99
5	Fantasia	1940	AFI's 100 Years...100 Movies – #58
6	Toy Story	1995	AFI's 100 Years...100 Movies (10th Anniversary Edition) – #99
7	Beauty and the Beast	1991	AFI's 100 Years...100 Passions – #34; AFI's 100 Years...100 Songs; 'Beauty and the Beast' – #62; AFI's Greatest Movie Musicals – #22
8	Shrek	2001	
9	Cinderella	1950	
10	Finding Nemo	2003	

== Courtroom drama ==
AFI defines "courtroom drama" as a genre of film in which a system of justice plays a critical role in the film's narrative.

#	Film	Year	Other Listings in AFI 100 Years... series
1	To Kill a Mockingbird	1962	AFI's 100 Years...100 Movies – #34; AFI's 100 Years...100 Heroes & Villains; Atticus Finch – #1 Hero; AFI's 100 Years of Film Scores – #17; AFI's 100 Years...100 Cheers – #2; AFI's 100 Years...100 Movies (10th Anniversary Edition) – #25
2	12 Angry Men	1957	AFI's 100 Years...100 Thrills – #88; AFI's 100 Years...100 Heroes & Villains; Juror #8 – #28 Hero; AFI's 100 Years...100 Cheers – #42; AFI's 100 Years...100 Movies (10th Anniversary Edition) – #87
3	Kramer vs. Kramer	1979	
4	The Verdict	1982	AFI's 100 Years...100 Cheers – #75
5	A Few Good Men	1992	AFI's 100 Years...100 Movie Quotes; "You can't handle the truth!" – #29
6	Witness for the Prosecution	1957	
7	Anatomy of a Murder	1959	
8	In Cold Blood	1967	
9	A Cry in the Dark	1988	
10	Judgment at Nuremberg	1961	

== Epic ==
AFI defines "epic" as a genre of large-scale films set in a cinematic interpretation of the past.

#	Film	Year	Other Listings in AFI 100 Years... series
1	Lawrence of Arabia	1962	AFI's 100 Years...100 Movies – #5; AFI's 100 Years...100 Thrills – #23; AFI's 100 Years...100 Heroes & Villains; T. E. Lawrence – #10 Hero; AFI's 100 Years of Film Scores – #3; AFI's 100 Years...100 Cheers – #30; AFI's 100 Years...100 Movies (10th Anniversary Edition) – #7
2	Ben-Hur	1959	AFI's 100 Years...100 Movies – #72; AFI's 100 Years...100 Thrills – #49; AFI's 100 Years of Film Scores – #21; AFI's 100 Years...100 Cheers – #56; AFI's 100 Years...100 Movies (10th Anniversary Edition) – #100
3	Schindler's List	1993	AFI's 100 Years...100 Movies – #9; AFI's 100 Years...100 Heroes & Villains; Oskar Schindler – #13 Hero; Amon Goeth – #15 Villain; AFI's 100 Years...100 Cheers – #3; AFI's 100 Years...100 Movies (10th Anniversary Edition) – #8
4	Gone with the Wind	1939	AFI's 100 Years...100 Movies – #4; AFI's 100 Years...100 Passions – #2; AFI's 100 Years...100 Movie Quotes; "Frankly, my dear, I don't give a damn." – #1; "After all, tomorrow is another day!" – #31; "As God is my witness, I'll never be hungry again." – #59; AFI's 100 Years of Film Scores – #2; AFI's 100 Years...100 Cheers – #43; AFI's 100 Years...100 Movies (10th Anniversary Edition) – #6
5	Spartacus	1960	AFI's 100 Years...100 Thrills – #62; AFI's 100 Years...100 Heroes & Villains; Spartacus – #22 Hero; AFI's 100 Years...100 Cheers – #44; AFI's 100 Years...100 Movies (10th Anniversary Edition) – #81
6	Titanic	1997	AFI's 100 Years...100 Thrills – #25; AFI's 100 Years...100 Passions – #37; AFI's 100 Years...100 Songs; 'My Heart Will Go On' – #14; AFI's 100 Years...100 Movie Quotes; "I'm the king of the world!" – #100; AFI's 100 Years...100 Movies (10th Anniversary Edition) – #83
7	All Quiet on the Western Front	1930	AFI's 100 Years...100 Movies – #54
8	Saving Private Ryan	1998	AFI's 100 Years...100 Thrills – #45; AFI's 100 Years...100 Cheers – #10; AFI's 100 Years...100 Movies (10th Anniversary Edition) – #71
9	Reds	1981	AFI's 100 Years...100 Passions – #55
10	The Ten Commandments	1956	AFI's 100 Years...100 Heroes & Villains; Moses – #43 Hero; AFI's 100 Years...100 Cheers – #79

== Fantasy ==
AFI defines "fantasy" as a genre in which live-action characters inhabit imagined settings and/or experience situations that transcend the rules of the natural world.

#	Film	Year	Other Listings in AFI 100 Years... series
1	The Wizard of Oz	1939	AFI's 100 Years...100 Movies – #6; AFI's 100 Years...100 Thrills – #43; AFI's 100 Years...100 Heroes & Villains; The Wicked Witch of the West – #4 Villain; AFI's 100 Years...100 Songs; 'Over the Rainbow' – #1; 'Ding-Dong! The Witch Is Dead' – #82; AFI's 100 Years...100 Movie Quotes; "Toto, I have a feeling we're not in Kansas anymore." – #4; "There's no place like home." – #23; "I'll get you, my pretty, and your little dog, too!" – #99; AFI's Greatest Movie Musicals – #3; AFI's 100 Years...100 Cheers – #26; AFI's 100 Years...100 Movies (10th Anniversary Edition) – #10
2	The Lord of the Rings: The Fellowship of the Ring	2001	AFI's 100 Years...100 Movies (10th Anniversary Edition) – #50
3	It's a Wonderful Life	1946	AFI's 100 Years...100 Movies – #11; AFI's 100 Years...100 Passions – #8; AFI's 100 Years...100 Heroes & Villains; Mr. Potter – #6 Villain; George Bailey – #9 Hero; AFI's 100 Years...100 Cheers – #1; AFI's 100 Years...100 Movies (10th Anniversary Edition) – #20
4	King Kong	1933	AFI's 100 Years...100 Movies – #43; AFI's 100 Years...100 Thrills – #12; AFI's 100 Years...100 Passions – #24; AFI's 100 Years...100 Movie Quotes; "Oh, no, it wasn't the airplanes. It was beauty killed the beast." – #84; AFI's 100 Years of Film Scores – #13; AFI's 100 Years...100 Movies (10th Anniversary Edition) – #41
5	Miracle on 34th Street	1947	AFI's 100 Years...100 Cheers – #9
6	Field of Dreams	1989	AFI's 100 Years...100 Movie Quotes; "If you build it, he will come." – #39; AFI's 100 Years...100 Cheers – #28
7	Harvey	1950	AFI's 100 Years...100 Laughs – #35
8	Groundhog Day	1993	AFI's 100 Years...100 Laughs – #34
9	The Thief of Bagdad	1924	
10	Big	1988	AFI's 100 Years...100 Laughs – #42

== Gangster ==
AFI defines the "gangster film" as a genre that centers on organized crime or maverick criminals in a modern setting.

#	Film	Year	Other Listings in AFI 100 Years... series
1	The Godfather	1972	AFI's 100 Years...100 Movies – #3; AFI's 100 Years...100 Thrills – #11; AFI's 100 Years...100 Movie Quotes; "I'm going to make him an offer he can't refuse." – #2; AFI's 100 Years of Film Scores – #5; AFI's 100 Years...100 Movies (10th Anniversary Edition) – #2
2	Goodfellas	1990	AFI's 100 Years...100 Movies – #94; AFI's 100 Years...100 Movies (10th Anniversary Edition) – #92
3	The Godfather Part II	1974	AFI's 100 Years...100 Movies – #32; AFI's 100 Years...100 Heroes & Villains; Michael Corleone – #11 Villain; AFI's 100 Years...100 Movie Quotes; "Keep your friends close, but your enemies closer." – #58; AFI's 100 Years...100 Movies (10th Anniversary Edition) – #32
4	White Heat	1949	AFI's 100 Years...100 Heroes & Villains; Cody Jarrett – #26 Villain; AFI's 100 Years...100 Movie Quotes; "Made it, Ma! Top of the world!" – #18
5	Bonnie and Clyde	1967	AFI's 100 Years...100 Movies – #27; AFI's 100 Years...100 Thrills – #13; AFI's 100 Years...100 Passions – #65; AFI's 100 Years...100 Heroes & Villains; Clyde Barrow & Bonnie Parker – #32 Villains; AFI's 100 Years...100 Movie Quotes; "We rob banks." – #41; AFI's 100 Years...100 Movies (10th Anniversary Edition) – #42
6	Scarface: The Shame of a Nation	1932	AFI's 100 Years...100 Heroes & Villains; Tony Camonte – #47 Villain
7	Pulp Fiction	1994	AFI's 100 Years...100 Movies – #95; AFI's 100 Years...100 Thrills – #53; AFI's 100 Years...100 Movies (10th Anniversary Edition) – #94
8	The Public Enemy	1931	AFI's 100 Years...100 Heroes & Villains; Tom Powers – #42 Villain
9	Little Caesar	1931	AFI's 100 Years...100 Heroes & Villains; Caesar Enrico Bandello – #38 Villain; AFI's 100 Years...100 Movie Quotes; "Mother of mercy, is this the end of Rico?" – #73
10	Scarface	1983	AFI's 100 Years...100 Movie Quotes; "Say 'hello' to my little friend!" – #61

== Mystery ==
AFI defines "mystery" as a genre that revolves around the solution of a crime. Four of the films were directed by Alfred Hitchcock.

#	Film	Year	Other Listings in AFI 100 Years... series
1	Vertigo	1958	AFI's 100 Years...100 Movies – #61; AFI's 100 Years...100 Thrills – #18; AFI's 100 Years...100 Passions – #18; AFI's 100 Years of Film Scores – #12; AFI's 100 Years...100 Movies (10th Anniversary Edition) – #9
2	Chinatown	1974	AFI's 100 Years...100 Movies – #19; AFI's 100 Years...100 Thrills – #16; AFI's 100 Years...100 Heroes & Villains; Noah Cross – #16 Villain; AFI's 100 Years...100 Movie Quotes; "Forget it, Jake. It's Chinatown." – #74; AFI's 100 Years of Film Scores – #9; AFI's 100 Years...100 Movies (10th Anniversary Edition) – #21
3	Rear Window	1954	AFI's 100 Years...100 Movies – #42; AFI's 100 Years...100 Thrills – #14; AFI's 100 Years...100 Movies (10th Anniversary Edition) – #48
4	Laura	1944	AFI's 100 Years...100 Thrills – #73; AFI's 100 Years of Film Scores – #7
5	The Third Man	1949	AFI's 100 Years...100 Movies – #57; AFI's 100 Years...100 Thrills – #75; AFI's 100 Years...100 Heroes & Villains; Harry Lime – #37 Villain
6	The Maltese Falcon	1941	AFI's 100 Years...100 Movies – #23; AFI's 100 Years...100 Thrills – #26; AFI's 100 Years...100 Movie Quotes; "The stuff that dreams are made of." – #14; AFI's 100 Years...100 Movies (10th Anniversary Edition) – #31
7	North by Northwest	1959	AFI's 100 Years...100 Movies – #40; AFI's 100 Years...100 Thrills – #4; AFI's 100 Years...100 Movies (10th Anniversary Edition) – #55
8	Blue Velvet	1986	AFI's 100 Years...100 Thrills – #96; AFI's 100 Years...100 Heroes & Villains; Frank Booth – #36 Villain
9	Dial M for Murder	1954	AFI's 100 Years...100 Thrills – #48
10	The Usual Suspects	1995	AFI's 100 Years...100 Heroes & Villains; Verbal Kint – #48 Villain

== Romantic comedy ==
AFI defines "romantic comedy" as a genre in which the development of a romance leads to comic situations.

#	Film	Year	Other Listings in AFI 100 Years... series
1	City Lights	1931	AFI's 100 Years...100 Movies – #76; AFI's 100 Years...100 Laughs – #38; AFI's 100 Years...100 Passions – #10; AFI's 100 Years...100 Heroes & Villains; The Tramp – #38 Hero; AFI's 100 Years...100 Cheers – #33; AFI's 100 Years...100 Movies (10th Anniversary Edition) – #11
2	Annie Hall	1977	AFI's 100 Years...100 Movies – #31; AFI's 100 Years...100 Laughs – #4; AFI's 100 Years...100 Passions – #11; AFI's 100 Years...100 Songs; 'Seems Like Old Times' – #90; AFI's 100 Years...100 Movie Quotes; "La-dee-da, la-dee-da." – #55; AFI's 100 Years...100 Movies (10th Anniversary Edition) – #35
3	It Happened One Night	1934	AFI's 100 Years...100 Movies – #35; AFI's 100 Years...100 Laughs – #8; AFI's 100 Years...100 Passions – #38; AFI's 100 Years...100 Movies (10th Anniversary Edition) – #46
4	Roman Holiday	1953	AFI's 100 Years...100 Passions – #4
5	The Philadelphia Story	1940	AFI's 100 Years...100 Movies – #51; AFI's 100 Years...100 Laughs – #15; AFI's 100 Years...100 Passions – #44; AFI's 100 Years...100 Movies (10th Anniversary Edition) – #44
6	When Harry Met Sally...	1989	AFI's 100 Years...100 Laughs – #23; AFI's 100 Years...100 Passions – #25; AFI's 100 Years...100 Songs; 'It Had to Be You' – #60; AFI's 100 Years...100 Movie Quotes; "I'll have what she's having." – #33
7	Adam's Rib	1949	AFI's 100 Years...100 Laughs – #22
8	Moonstruck	1987	AFI's 100 Years...100 Laughs – #41; AFI's 100 Years...100 Passions – #17; AFI's 100 Years...100 Movie Quotes; "Snap out of it!" – #96
9	Harold and Maude	1971	AFI's 100 Years...100 Laughs – #45; AFI's 100 Years...100 Passions – #69; AFI's 100 Years...100 Cheers – #89
10	Sleepless in Seattle	1993	AFI's 100 Years...100 Passions – #45

== Science fiction ==
AFI defines "science fiction" as a genre that marries a scientific or technological premise with imaginative speculation.

#	Film	Year	Other Listings in AFI 100 Years... series
1	2001: A Space Odyssey	1968	AFI's 100 Years...100 Movies – #22; AFI's 100 Years...100 Thrills – #40; AFI's 100 Years...100 Heroes & Villains; HAL 9000 – #13 Villain; AFI's 100 Years...100 Movie Quotes; "Open the pod bay doors, HAL." – #78; AFI's 100 Years...100 Cheers – #47; AFI's 100 Years...100 Movies (10th Anniversary Edition) – #15
2	Star Wars	1977	AFI's 100 Years...100 Movies – #15; AFI's 100 Years...100 Thrills – #27; AFI's 100 Years...100 Heroes & Villains; Han Solo – #14 Hero; Obi-Wan Kenobi – #37 Hero; AFI's 100 Years...100 Movie Quotes; "May the Force be with you." – #8; AFI's 100 Years of Film Scores – #1; AFI's 100 Years...100 Cheers – #39; AFI's 100 Years...100 Movies (10th Anniversary Edition) – #13
3	E.T. the Extra-Terrestrial	1982	AFI's 100 Years...100 Movies – #25; AFI's 100 Years...100 Thrills – #44; AFI's 100 Years...100 Movie Quotes; "E.T. phone home." – #15; AFI's 100 Years of Film Scores – #14; AFI's 100 Years...100 Cheers – #6; AFI's 100 Years...100 Movies (10th Anniversary Edition) – #24
4	A Clockwork Orange	1971	AFI's 100 Years...100 Movies – #46; AFI's 100 Years...100 Thrills – #21; AFI's 100 Years...100 Heroes & Villains; Alex De Large – #12 Villain; AFI's 100 Years...100 Movies (10th Anniversary Edition) – #70
5	The Day the Earth Stood Still	1951	AFI's 100 Years...100 Thrills – #82; AFI's 100 Years...100 Cheers – #67
6	Blade Runner	1982	AFI's 100 Years...100 Thrills – #74; AFI's 100 Years...100 Movies (10th Anniversary Edition) – #97
7	Alien	1979	AFI's 100 Years...100 Thrills – #6; AFI's 100 Years...100 Heroes & Villains; The Alien – #14 Villain
8	Terminator 2: Judgment Day	1991	AFI's 100 Years...100 Thrills – #77; AFI's 100 Years...100 Heroes & Villains; Terminator – #48 Hero; AFI's 100 Years...100 Movie Quotes; "Hasta la vista, baby." – #76
9	Invasion of the Body Snatchers	1956	AFI's 100 Years...100 Thrills – #47
10	Back to the Future	1985	

== Sports ==
AFI defines "sports" as a genre of films with protagonists who play athletics or other games of competition.

#	Film	Year	Other Listings in AFI 100 Years... series
1	Raging Bull	1980	AFI's 100 Years...100 Movies – #24; AFI's 100 Years...100 Thrills – #51; AFI's 100 Years...100 Movies (10th Anniversary Edition) – #4
2	Rocky	1976	AFI's 100 Years...100 Movies – #78; AFI's 100 Years...100 Thrills – #52; AFI's 100 Years...100 Heroes & Villains; Rocky Balboa – #7 Hero; AFI's 100 Years...100 Songs; 'Gonna Fly Now' – #58; AFI's 100 Years...100 Movie Quotes; "Yo, Adrian!" – #80; AFI's 100 Years...100 Cheers – #4; AFI's 100 Years...100 Movies (10th Anniversary Edition) – #57
3	The Pride of the Yankees	1942	AFI's 100 Years...100 Heroes & Villains; Lou Gehrig – #25 Hero; AFI's 100 Years...100 Movie Quotes; "Today, I consider myself the luckiest man on the face of the earth." – #38; AFI's 100 Years...100 Cheers – #22
4	Hoosiers	1986	AFI's 100 Years...100 Cheers – #13
5	Bull Durham	1988	AFI's 100 Years...100 Laughs – #97
6	The Hustler	1961	
7	Caddyshack	1980	AFI's 100 Years...100 Laughs – #71; AFI's 100 Years...100 Movie Quotes; "Cinderella story. Out of nowhere. A former greenskeeper, now about to become the Masters champion. It looks like a mirac - It's in the hole! It's in the hole!" – #92
8	Breaking Away	1979	AFI's 100 Years...100 Cheers – #8
9	National Velvet	1944	AFI's 100 Years...100 Cheers – #24
10	Jerry Maguire	1996	AFI's 100 Years...100 Passions – #100; AFI's 100 Years...100 Movie Quotes; "Show me the money!" – #25; "You had me at 'hello'." – #52

== Western ==
AFI defines "western" as a genre of films set in the American West that embodies the spirit, the struggle, and the demise of the new frontier. Actor John Wayne has lead roles in three of the ten films.

#	Film	Year	Other Listings in AFI 100 Years... series
1	The Searchers	1956	AFI's 100 Years...100 Movies – #96; AFI's 100 Years...100 Movies (10th Anniversary Edition) – #12
2	High Noon	1952	AFI's 100 Years...100 Movies – #33; AFI's 100 Years...100 Thrills – #20; AFI's 100 Years...100 Heroes & Villains; Will Kane – #5 Hero; AFI's 100 Years...100 Songs; 'High Noon (Do Not Forsake Me, Oh My Darlin)' – #25; AFI's 100 Years of Film Scores – #10; AFI's 100 Years...100 Cheers – #27; AFI's 100 Years...100 Movies (10th Anniversary Edition) – #27
3	Shane	1953	AFI's 100 Years...100 Movies – #69; AFI's 100 Years...100 Heroes & Villains; Shane – #16 Hero; AFI's 100 Years...100 Movie Quotes; "Shane. Shane. Come back!" – #47; AFI's 100 Years...100 Cheers – #53; AFI's 100 Years...100 Movies (10th Anniversary Edition) – #45
4	Unforgiven	1992	AFI's 100 Years...100 Movies – #98; AFI's 100 Years...100 Movies (10th Anniversary Edition) – #68
5	Red River	1948	
6	The Wild Bunch	1969	AFI's 100 Years...100 Movies – #80; AFI's 100 Years...100 Thrills – #69; AFI's 100 Years...100 Movies (10th Anniversary Edition) – #79
7	Butch Cassidy and the Sundance Kid	1969	AFI's 100 Years...100 Movies – #50; AFI's 100 Years...100 Thrills – #54; AFI's 100 Years...100 Heroes & Villains; Butch Cassidy & the Sundance Kid – #20 Heroes; AFI's 100 Years...100 Songs; 'Raindrops Keep Fallin' on My Head' – #23; AFI's 100 Years...100 Movies (10th Anniversary Edition) – #73
8	McCabe & Mrs. Miller	1971	
9	Stagecoach	1939	AFI's 100 Years...100 Movies – #63
10	Cat Ballou	1965	AFI's 100 Years...100 Laughs – #50
