= AFI 100 Years... series =

Lists of films for the commemoration of American cinema

- 1998: 100 Movies
- 1999: 100 Stars
- 2000: 100 Laughs
- 2001: 100 Thrills
- 2002: 100 Passions
- 2003: 100 Heroes & Villains
- 2004: 100 Songs
- 2005: 100 Movie Quotes
- 2005: 25 Scores
- 2006: 100 Cheers
- 2006: 25 Musicals
- 2007: 100 Movies (Updated)
- 2008: AFI's 10 Top 10

The AFI's 100 Years... series was a series of annual lists from 1998 to 2008 by the American Film Institute—typically accompanied by CBS television specials—celebrating the century of American cinema.

As a centennial celebration of cinematic milestones, the series intended to inspire discussion and public interest in classical Hollywood cinema. As such, each list only included feature-length American films that were typically released before 2005. AFI defined "American film" as an "English language motion picture with significant creative and/or financial production elements from the United States;" and "feature-length film" as a "motion picture of narrative format that is typically over 60 minutes in length."

To determine the composition of these lists, the names of a few hundred nominated films were listed on ballots that AFI would distribute to a jury of over 1,000 leaders in the creative industry, including film artists (directors, screenwriters, actors, editors, cinematographers), critics, and historians.

== Lists of the series ==
- 1998: AFI's 100 Years...100 Movies — top "greatest American films of all time"
- 1999: AFI's 100 Years...100 Stars — the 50 greatest American "screen legends" of all time (25 women and 25 men)
  - AFI defined an "American screen legend" as "an actor or a team of actors with a significant screen presence in American feature-length films whose screen debut occurred in or before 1950, or whose screen debut occurred after 1950 but whose death has marked a completed body of work."
- 2000: AFI's 100 Years...100 Laughs — funniest American films
  - While not specific to any genre, this list generally centered on comedies, including such sub-genres as satire, screwball, slapstick, action comedy, black comedy, musical comedy, romantic comedy, and comedy of manners.
- 2001: AFI's 100 Years...100 Thrills — most 'thrilling' American films
  - This list was not specific to any genre, focussing instead on the total "adrenaline-inducing impact" of a film, engaging both the audience's bodies and minds.
- 2002: AFI's 100 Years...100 Passions — the "greatest love stories of all time"
  - Though not specific to the romance genre, this list concerned films with "a romantic bond between two or more characters, whose actions and/or intentions provide the heart of the film's narrative."
- 2003: AFI's 100 Years...100 Heroes & Villains — the top American film heroes and villains of all time (50 each)
  - A "hero" was defined as "a character(s) who prevails in extreme circumstances and dramatizes a sense of morality, courage and purpose." A "villain" was defined as "a character(s) whose wickedness of mind, selfishness of character and will to power are sometimes masked by beauty and nobility, while others may rage unmasked."
- 2004: AFI's 100 Years...100 Songs — the top American movie songs of all time
  - For this list, "song" was defined as "[m]usic and lyrics...that set a tone or mood, define character, advance plot and/or express the film's themes in a manner that elevates" the art of film. Songs can include those "written and/or recorded specifically for the film" as well as those "previously written and/or recorded and selected by the filmmaker to achieve the above goals."
- 2005: AFI's 100 Years...100 Movie Quotes — top American film quotes of all time
  - Selection for this list considered quotes that "circulate through popular culture, become part of the national lexicon and evoke the memory of a treasured film."
- 2005: AFI's 100 Years of Film Scores — the 25 greatest American films scores of all time
  - The list did not originally air on television; it was presented at the Hollywood Bowl during a special live event produced by the Los Angeles Philharmonic Association.
- 2006: AFI's 100 Years...100 Cheers — most inspiring American films of all time
  - Films in this list "inspire" viewers, encourage people "to make a difference", and leave audiences "with a greater sense of possibility and hope for the future".
- 2006: AFI's Greatest Movie Musicals — the 25 greatest American musical films of all time
  - The list did not originally air on television; it was presented at the Hollywood Bowl during a special live event produced by the LA Philharmonic Association.
- 2007: AFI's 100 Years...100 Movies (10th Anniversary Edition) — an updated edition of AFI's "100 Years...100 Movies" list from 1998
  - This list removed 23 films from the original list, adding in their place 4 films released from 1996 to 2006 and 19 films made before 1996.
- 2008: AFI's 10 Top 10 — the 10 greatest films in 10 classic American film genres
  - The 10 genres were: animation, courtroom drama, epic, fantasy, gangster, mystery, romantic comedy, science fiction, sports, and western.

== See also ==
- List of films considered the best
