= Houston, we have a problem =

1970 misquotation from Apollo 13

- Origin: Apollo 13 (mission)
- Original form: "Okay, Houston ... we've had a problem here"
- Coined by: Jack Swigert (April 14, 1970)

Houston, we've had a problem.
Swigert and Lovell reporting the incident on April 13, 1970 (2:59)

"Houston, we have a problem" is a popular misquote of a phrase spoken during Apollo 13, a NASA mission in the Apollo space program and the third mission intended to land on the Moon.

After an explosion occurred on board the spacecraft en route to the Moon around 56 hours into the mission, (Note: Flight Journal: "at 055:54:53 GET [Ground-Elapsed Time], the tank explodes") Jack Swigert, the command module pilot, reported to Mission Control Center in Houston, Texas: "Okay, Houston ... we've had a problem here." After Swigert was prompted to repeat his words by Jack R. Lousma, the capsule communicator at Mission Control, Jim Lovell, the mission commander, responded: "Ah, Houston, we've had a problem."

Although the Houston Chronicle later identified Ron Howard's 1995 drama film Apollo 13 as the source of the popular misquotation, the error was of longer standing. The 1974 television drama Houston, We've Got a Problem, largely about Mission Control's perspective on the emergency, had brought a misstatement of the phrase into popular culture years earlier. Later, in 1983, NASA itself used the now-current misquotation "Houston, we have a problem" as the title of its weekly radio program about space history.

Howard's film used "Houston, we have a problem" in dramatizing the mission because by then it had become so prevalent that the audience expected it. The phrase has come into informal use to describe the emergence of an unforeseen problem, often with a sense of ironic understatement.

== Background ==
The Apollo 13 Flight Journal lists the timestamps and dialogue between the astronauts and Mission Control.

055:55:19 Swigert: Okay, Houston ...

055:55:19 Lovell: ... Houston...

055:55:20 Swigert: ... we've had a problem here. [Pause.]

055:55:28 Lousma: This is Houston. Say again, please.

055:55:35 Lovell: [Garble.] Ah, Houston, we've had a problem. We've had a Main B Bus Undervolt.

In Chapter 13 of Apollo Expeditions to the Moon (1975), Jim Lovell recalls the event: "Jack Swigert saw a warning light that accompanied the bang, and said, 'Houston, we've had a problem here.' I came on and told the ground that it was a main B bus undervolt. The time was 21:08 hours on April 13."

== In media ==
Houston, we have a problem
- Character: Jim Lovell
- Actor: Tom Hanks
- Written by: William Broyles Jr. Al Reinert
- First used in: Apollo 13
- Voted #50 in AFI's 100 Movie Quotes poll

In the 1995 film Apollo 13, the actual quote was shortened to "Houston, we have a problem." The screenwriter William Broyles Jr. explained that the verb tense actually used "wasn't as dramatic." Broyles and the American University linguist Naomi S. Baron noted that the actual line spoken would not work well in a suspense movie. "It is saying something has happened, and it’s over,” declared Broyles. "The past perfect tense wasn’t as dramatic as 'We have a problem' — which meant that the problem was happening right then and was continuing, which in fact it was and would shortly cause the mission to abort." Movie viewers already knew what had happened, while Mission Control did not at the time.

The quote ranked at No. 50 on AFI's 100 Greatest Movie Quotes in June 2005.

== See also ==
- "One small step"

== Bibliography ==
- Lovell, Jim; Kluger, Jeffrey (1994). Lost Moon. Houghton Mifflin. ISBN 0395670292.
