= To Kill a Mockingbird (film) =

1962 American drama film

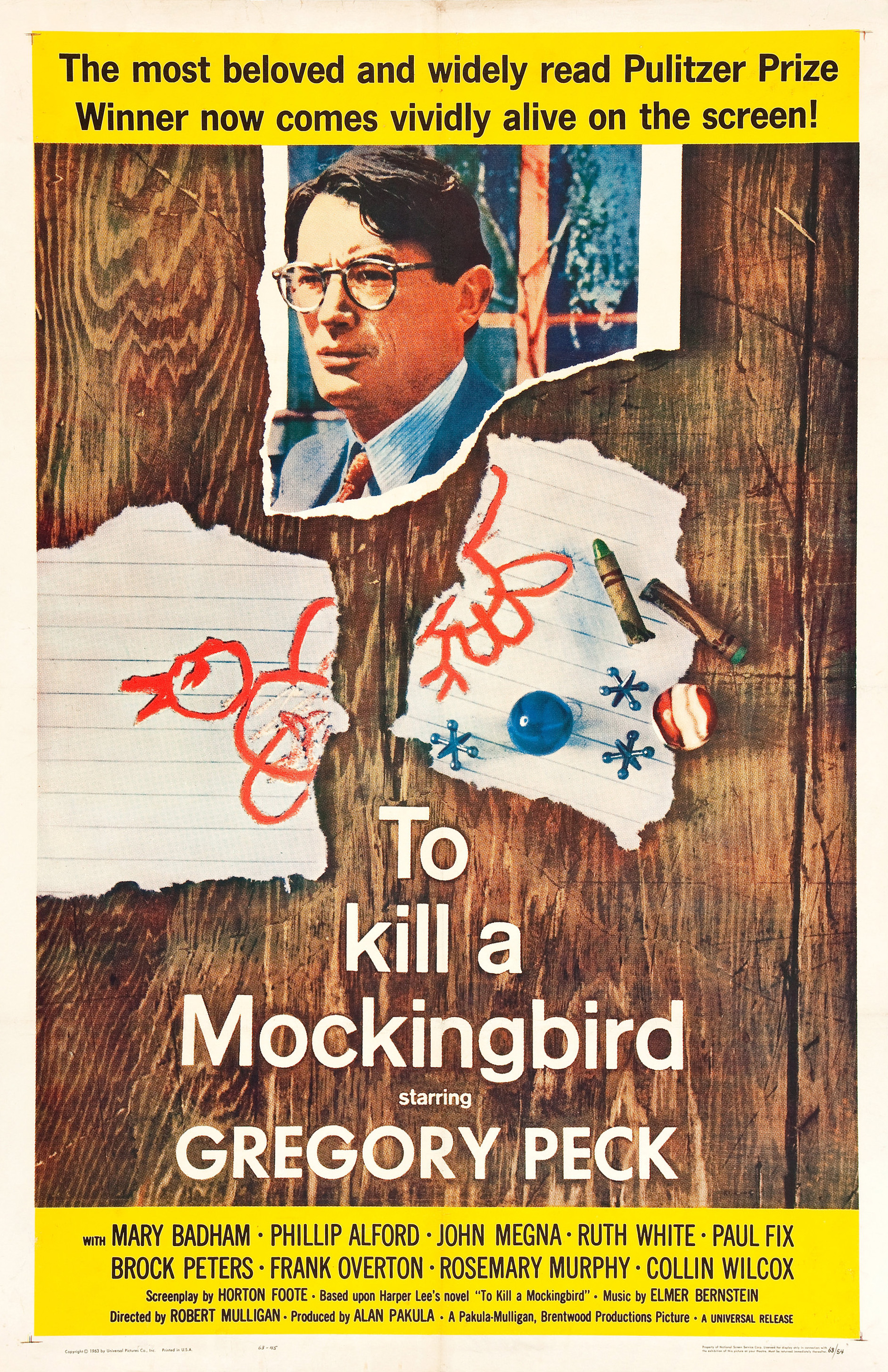
- Theatrical release poster
- Directed by: Robert Mulligan
- Screenplay by: Horton Foote
- Based on: To Kill a Mockingbird; 1960 novel by Harper Lee
- Produced by: Alan J. Pakula
- Starring: Gregory Peck; Mary Badham; Phillip Alford; Ruth White; Paul Fix; Brock Peters; Frank Overton; James Anderson
- Narrated by: Kim Stanley
- Cinematography: Russell Harlan, A.S.C.
- Edited by: Aaron Stell, A.C.E.
- Music by: Elmer Bernstein
- Production company: Brentwood Productions
- Distributed by: Universal-International Pictures
- Release date: December 25, 1962 (United States)
- Running time: 129 minutes
- Country: United States
- Language: English
- Budget: $2 million
- Box office: $13.1 million

The film's trailer

To Kill a Mockingbird is a 1962 American legal drama crime film directed by Robert Mulligan and starring Gregory Peck and Mary Badham. Adapted from Harper Lee's 1960 Pulitzer Prize–winning novel To Kill a Mockingbird, the film follows lawyer Atticus Finch in Depression-era Alabama educating his children against the Jim Crow laws while defending a black man who is wrongfully indicted for the rape of a white woman.

The film won overwhelmingly positive reception from both the critics and the public; a box-office success, it earned more than six times its budget. The film was awarded three Academy Awards, including Best Actor and Best Adapted Screenplay, and was nominated for eight, including Best Picture, Best Director, and Best Supporting Actress.

In 1995, the film was selected by the Library of Congress for preservation in the National Film Registry as "culturally, historically, or aesthetically significant". In 2003, the American Film Institute named Atticus Finch the greatest movie hero of the 20th century. In 2007, the film ranked twenty-fifth on the AFI's 10th anniversary list of the greatest American movies of all time. In 2008, the film ranked first on the AFI's list of the ten greatest courtroom dramas. In 2020, the British Film Institute included it in their list of the 50 films you should see by the age of 15. The film was restored and released on Blu-ray and DVD in 2012, as part of the 100th anniversary of Universal Pictures.

== Plot ==
The story is set during the Great Depression in the fictional segregated town of Maycomb, Alabama. Scout, aged six, lives with her older brother Jem and their widowed father Atticus, a white middle-aged lawyer. Guided by a strong social conscience, Atticus often represents poor farmers who pay him in produce or firewood.

Jem and Scout befriend Dill, a boy who visits each summer. The three are both frightened and intrigued by their reclusive neighbour, Arthur "Boo" Radley. They fuel each other's imaginations with tales about him and devise ways to lure him outside. After two summers, Scout and Jem begin finding small gifts left in a tree outside the Radley house.

Atticus is appointed to defend Tom Robinson, a black man falsely accused of raping Mayella Ewell, a young white woman and the daughter of Bob Ewell, a violent and racist drunkard. The case inflames racial tensions in the already segregated town, and Jem and Scout are taunted at school. On the night before the trial, Atticus positions himself outside the jail where Tom is being held. A lynch mob arrives. The children unexpectedly intervene, and Scout, recognizing the father of a schoolmate, starts a friendly chat. Embarrassed, he persuades the mob to disperse.

Jem and Scout sneak into the courtroom to see Tom's trial. With no available seats on the main floor, a local pastor invites them up to the colored balcony. Mayella claims that she invited Tom in to chop up a chifforobe and that he grabbed her by the throat, beat her, and raped her. Witnesses testify that she had bruises on her neck and both arms and had been heavily 'knocked about' the right side of her head. Atticus points out that the attacker must have been left-handed, and that Tom had entirely lost the use of his left arm some years earlier in a farming accident. In spite of witness assertions, there was no medical evidence of any rape, nor was any doctor called. Atticus suggests that Mayella was actually beaten by her own father, who is indeed left-handed; she unconvincingly denies it.

Tom testifies that Mayella had invited him in to help with some chores, as she had done many times before. When he noted that the house was unusually quiet, she explained that she had saved up and sent the children off into town to buy ice creams. She then kissed him against his will. Feeling extremely uncomfortable, Tom was attempting to leave when Bob appeared, drunk and enraged. Asked by the prosecution lawyer why he had been doing chores for Mayella without payment, Tom replies that he had "felt sorry for her" – words that offend the white spectators. Atticus urges the all-white jury to ignore the Jim Crow laws and recognize Tom's innocence; nonetheless, Tom is found guilty. As Atticus leaves the courtroom, the black spectators in the gallery rise in respect.

Atticus hopes for an appeal, but learns from Sheriff Tate that Tom has been shot dead while supposedly trying to escape. He breaks the news to Tom's family. Bob Ewell appears and spits in his face.

Autumn arrives. While walking home through the woods, Jem and Scout are attacked. Jem suffers a broken arm and is knocked unconscious, but amid the confusion, someone intervenes and Scout sees a strange man carrying Jem home. Atticus calls for a doctor and for Sheriff Tate. As Scout finishes telling the sheriff what happened, her father introduces her to a man shyly standing behind the door: their rescuer, Boo Radley.

Bob Ewell is found dead at the scene. Atticus mistakenly assumes Jem must have stabbed him in self-defense, but Sheriff Tate knows that Boo acted to protect the children. Realizing, however, that no purpose would be served by prosecuting Boo, he insists that Ewell must have fallen on his own knife. Scout walks Boo home, taking a moment to stand on the Radley porch to imagine life from his perspective.

An adult Scout narrates, recalling that eventful summer and how Atticus had sat all night by Jem's bed, ready to be there for him when he awoke.

== Cast ==
- Gregory Peck as Atticus Finch
- Mary Badham as Jean Louise "Scout" Finch
- Phillip Alford as Jeremy "Jem" Finch
- John Megna as Charles Baker "Dill" Harris
- Frank Overton as Sheriff Heck Tate
- Rosemary Murphy as Miss Maudie Atkinson
- Ruth White as Mrs. Dubose
- Brock Peters as Tom Robinson
- Estelle Evans as Calpurnia
- Paul Fix as Judge John Taylor
- Collin Wilcox as Mayella Violet Ewell
- James Anderson as Robert E. Lee "Bob" Ewell
- Alice Ghostley as Miss Stephanie Crawford
- Robert Duvall as Arthur "Boo" Radley
- William Windom as Horace Gilmer, District Attorney
- Crahan Denton as Walter Cunningham
- Richard Hale as Nathan Radley

=== Uncredited cast members in order of appearance ===
- Kim Stanley as the narrator; the voice of adult Scout – "Maycomb was a tired old town – even in 1932 when I first knew it – that summer I was six years old."
- Paulene Myers as Jessie, Mrs. Dubose's servant, sitting close to her on the Dubose porch.
- Jamie Forster as Mr. Townsend, sitting on a bench, with three men, near the courthouse: "If you're lookin' for your daddy, he's inside the courthouse."
- Steve Condit as Walter Cunningham Jr., Mr. Cunningham's son, at dinner with the Finch family: "Yes, sir. I don't know when I had roast. We been havin' squirrels and rabbits lately."
- David Crawford as David, Tom Robinson's son, sitting on the steps to the Robinsons' shack: "Good evening."
- Kim Hamilton as Helen, Tom Robinson's wife, inside the Robinsons' shack: "Good evening, Mr. Finch."
- Dan White as the mob leader approaching as Atticus Finch sits in front of the jailhouse: "He in there, Mr. Finch?"
- Kelly Thordsen as a heavyset member of the mob who grabs and picks up Jem: "Well, I'll send you home."
- William "Bill" Walker as Reverend Sykes, at the courthouse for Tom Robinson's trial: "Miss Jean Louise? Miss Jean Louise, stand up. Your father's passin'."
- Charles Fredericks as the court clerk at Tom Robinson's trial: "Place your hand on the bible, please. Do you solemnly swear to tell the truth...?"
- Guy Wilkerson as the jury foreman at Tom Robinson's trial: "We find the defendant guilty as charged."
- Jay Sullivan as the court reporter at Tom Robinson's trial: "Yes."
- Jester Hairston as Spence, Tom Robinson's father in front of the Robinsons' shack: "Hello Mr. Finch. I'm Spence, Tom's father."
- Hugh Sanders as Doctor Reynolds, the town physician who examines Jem: "He's got a bad break, so far as I can tell. Somebody tried to wring his arm off."

=== Casting ===
James Stewart declined the role of Atticus Finch, concerned that the story was too controversial. Universal offered the role to Rock Hudson when the project was being first developed but producer Alan J. Pakula wanted a bigger star.

Pakula remembered hearing from Peck when he was first approached with the role: "He called back immediately. No maybes. [...] I must say the man and the character he played were not unalike". Peck later said in an interview that he was drawn to the role because the book reminded him of growing up in La Jolla, California.

The 1962 softcover edition of the novel opens:

"The Southern town of Maycomb, Alabama, reminds me of the California town I grew up in. The characters of the novel are like people I knew as a boy. I think perhaps the great appeal of the novel is that it reminds readers everywhere of a person or a town they have known. It is to me a universal story – moving, passionate and told with great humor and tenderness." Gregory Peck.

== Production ==
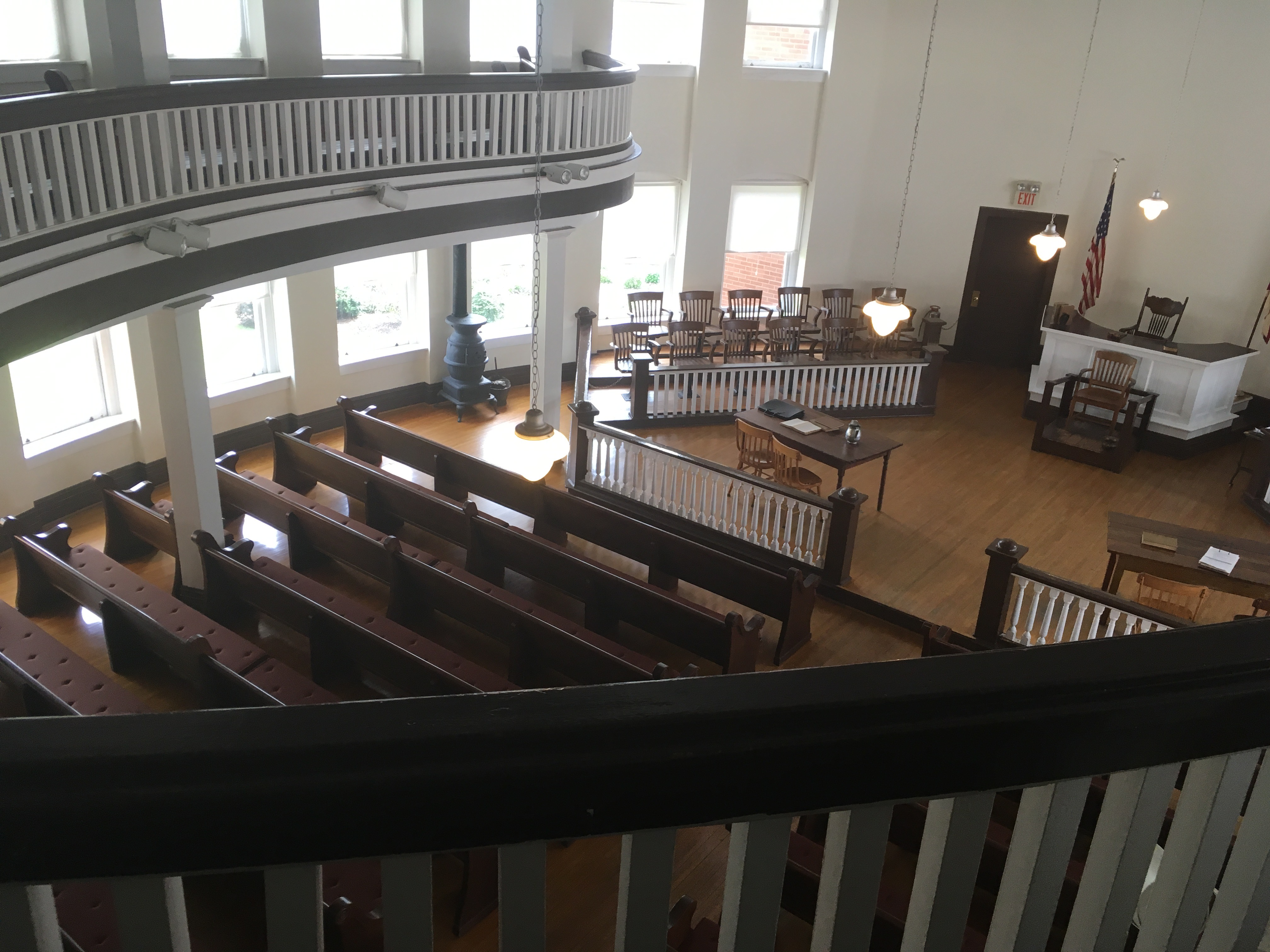
The Old Monroe County Courthouse was the model for the set used in the film.

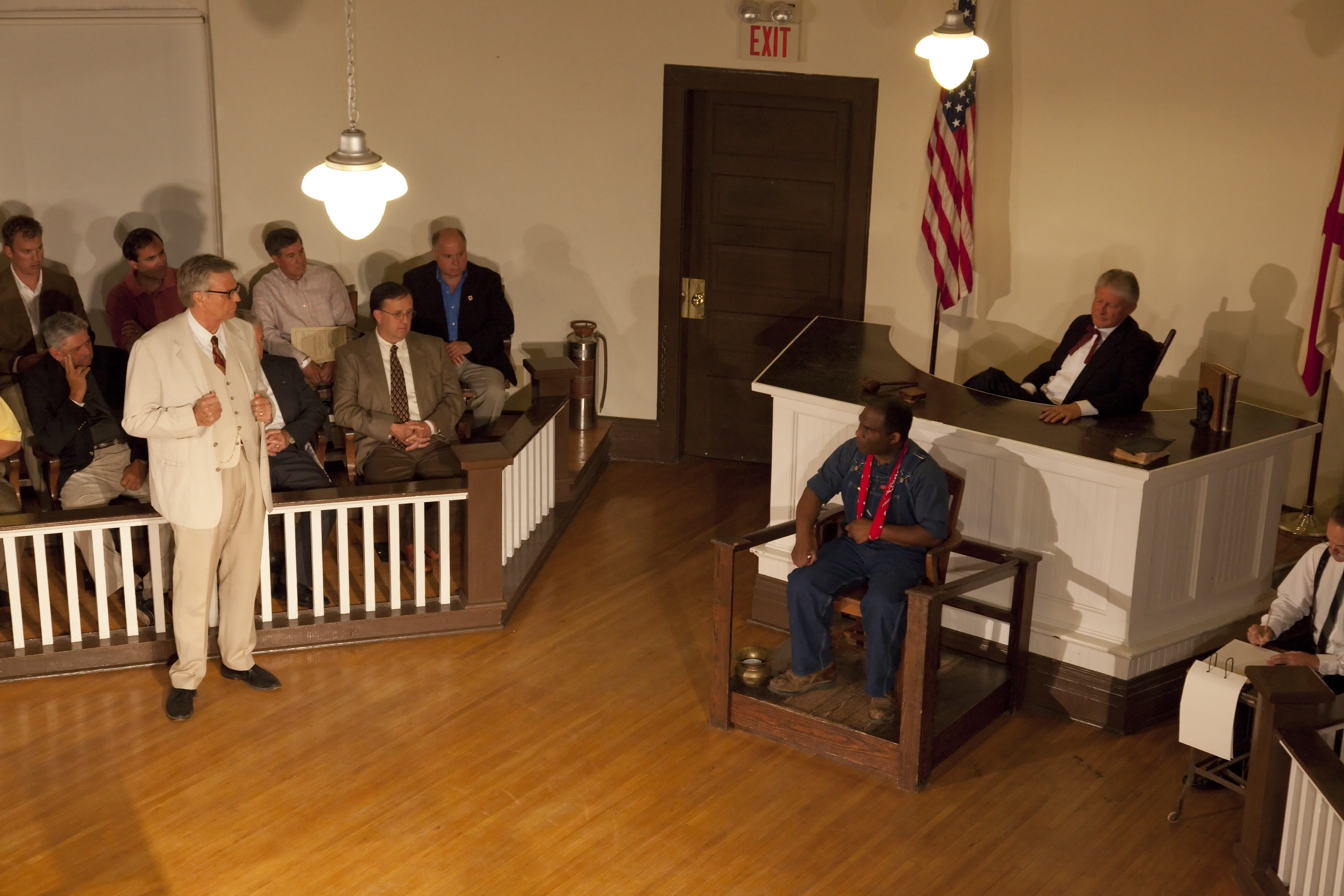
A scene from the play performed in the actual courthouse in Monroeville

The producers had wanted to use Harper Lee's hometown of Monroeville, Alabama for the set. Harper Lee used her experiences as a child in Monroeville as the basis for the fictional town of Maycomb, so it seemed that would be the best place. However, the town had changed significantly between the 1920s and the early 1960s, so they made it on the backlot in Hollywood instead. Principal photography began from 12 Feb 1962 to mid-May 1962.

The Old Monroe County Courthouse in Monroeville was used as a model for the film set, since they could not use the courthouse due to its poor acoustics. The accuracy of the recreated courthouse in Hollywood led many Alabamians to believe that the film was shot in Monroeville. The Old Courthouse in Monroe County is now a theater for many plays inspired by To Kill a Mockingbird as well as a museum dedicated to multiple authors from Monroeville.

== Reception ==
The film received widespread critical acclaim and has a 93% rating on Rotten Tomatoes, based on 69 reviews, with an average rating of 8.9/10. The site's critical consensus states, "To Kill a Mockingbird is a textbook example of a message movie done right – sober-minded and earnest, but never letting its social conscience get in the way of gripping drama." At Metacritic, which assigns a normalized rating to reviews, the film received a score of 88 out of 100, based on 16 critics, meaning "universal acclaim". According to Bosley Crowther of The New York Times when the movie premiered at the Radio City Music Hall:

Horton Foote's script and the direction of Mr. Mulligan may not penetrate that deeply, but they do allow Mr. Peck and little Miss Badham and Master Alford to portray delightful characters. Their charming enactments of a father and his children in that close relationship, which can occur at only one brief period, are worth all the footage of the film. Rosemary Murphy as a neighbor, Brock Peters as the Negro on trial, and Frank Overton as a troubled sheriff are good as locality characters, too. James Anderson and Collin Wilcox as Southern bigots are almost caricatures. But those are minor shortcomings in a rewarding film.

Roger Ebert of the Chicago Sun-Times criticized the film for focusing less on black people, criticizing the film for having a white savior narrative:

It expresses the liberal pieties of a more innocent time, the early 1960s, and it goes very easy on the realities of small-town Alabama in the 1930s. One of the most dramatic scenes shows a lynch mob facing Atticus, who is all by himself on the jailhouse steps the night before Tom Robinson's trial. The mob is armed and prepared to break in and hang Robinson, but Scout bursts onto the scene, recognizes a poor farmer who has been befriended by her father, and shames him (and all the other men) into leaving. Her speech is a calculated strategic exercise, masked as the innocent words of a child; one shot of her eyes shows she realizes exactly what she's doing. Could a child turn away a lynch mob at that time, in that place? Isn't it nice to think so.

Walt Disney requested that the film be privately screened in his house. At the film's conclusion, Disney sadly stated, "That was one hell of a picture. That's the kind of film I wish I could make."

In a retrospective review, American film critic Pauline Kael claimed that, when Gregory Peck received the Academy Award for Best Actor:

... there was a fair amount of derision throughout the country: Peck was better than usual, but in that same virtuously dull way. (There was the suspicion that Peck was being rewarded because the Lincolnesque lawyer shot a rabid dog and defended an innocent black man accused of raping a white woman.)

Peck's performance became synonymous with the role and character of Atticus Finch. "Hardly a day passes that I don't think how lucky I was to be cast in that film", Peck said in a 1997 interview. "I recently sat at a dinner next to a woman who saw it when she was 14 years old, and she said it changed her life. I hear things like that all the time".

Harper Lee, in liner notes written for the film's DVD re-release by Universal, wrote:

When I learned that Gregory Peck would play Atticus Finch in the film production of To Kill a Mockingbird, I was of course delighted: here was a fine actor who had made great films – what more could a writer ask for? ... The years told me his secret. When he played Atticus Finch, he had played himself, and time has told all of us something more: when he played himself, he touched the world.

Upon Peck's death in 2003, Brock Peters, who played Tom Robinson in the film version, quoted Harper Lee at Peck's eulogy, saying, "Atticus Finch gave him an opportunity to play himself". Peters concluded his eulogy stating, "To my friend Gregory Peck, to my friend Atticus Finch, vaya con Dios". Peters remembered the role of Tom Robinson when he recalled, "It certainly is one of my proudest achievements in life, one of the happiest participations in film or theater I have experienced". Peters remained friends not only with Peck but with Mary Badham throughout his life.

Peck himself admitted that many people reminded him of this film more than any other film he had ever done.

== Awards and honors ==
Award	Category	Nominee(s)	Result
Academy Awards	Best Picture	Alan J. Pakula	Nominated
Academy Awards	Best Director	Robert Mulligan	Nominated
Academy Awards	Best Actor	Gregory Peck	Won
Academy Awards	Best Supporting Actress	Mary Badham	Nominated
Academy Awards	Best Adapted Screenplay	Horton Foote	Won
Academy Awards	Best Art Direction	Alexander Golitzen, Henry Bumstead and Oliver Emert	Won
Academy Awards	Best Cinematography	Russell Harlan	Nominated
Academy Awards	Best Original Score	Elmer Bernstein	Nominated
American Cinema Editors Awards	Best Edited Feature Film	Aaron Stell	Nominated
British Academy Film Awards	Best Film from any Source		Nominated
British Academy Film Awards	Best Foreign Actor	Gregory Peck	Nominated
Cannes Film Festival	Palme d'Or	Robert Mulligan	Nominated
Cannes Film Festival	Gary Cooper Award	Robert Mulligan	Won
David di Donatello Awards	Best Foreign Actor	Gregory Peck	Won
Directors Guild of America Awards	Outstanding Directorial Achievement in Motion Pictures	Robert Mulligan	Nominated
Golden Globe Awards	Best Motion Picture – Drama		Nominated
Golden Globe Awards	Best Actor in a Motion Picture – Drama	Gregory Peck	Won
Golden Globe Awards	Best Director – Motion Picture	Robert Mulligan	Nominated
Golden Globe Awards	Best Original Score – Motion Picture	Elmer Bernstein	Won
Golden Globe Awards	Best Film Promoting International Understanding		Won
Laurel Awards	Top General Entertainment		Won
Laurel Awards	Top Male Dramatic Performance	Gregory Peck	Nominated
Laurel Awards	Top Female Supporting Performance	Mary Badham	Nominated
National Film Preservation Board	National Film Registry		Inducted
New York Film Critics Circle Awards	Best Film		Nominated
New York Film Critics Circle Awards	Best Screenplay	Horton Foote	Nominated
Online Film & Television Association Awards	Hall of Fame – Motion Picture		Won
Producers Guild of America Awards	PGA Hall of Fame – Motion Pictures	Alan J. Pakula	Won
Writers Guild of America Awards	Best Written American Drama	Horton Foote	Won

In 1995, To Kill a Mockingbird was selected for preservation in the United States National Film Registry by the Library of Congress as being "culturally, historically, or aesthetically significant". It is also Robert Duvall's cinema debut, as the misunderstood recluse Boo Radley. Duvall was cast on the recommendation of screenwriter Horton Foote, who met him at Neighborhood Playhouse in New York City where Duvall starred in a 1957 production of Foote's play, The Midnight Caller.

In 2006, Writers Guild of America ranked its screenplay 19th in WGA’s list of 101 Greatest Screenplays. In 2007, Hamilton was honored by the Harlem community for her part in the movie. She was the last surviving African-American adult who had a speaking part in the movie. When told of the award, she said, "I think it is terrific. I'm very pleased and very surprised".

The American Film Institute named Atticus Finch the greatest movie hero of the 20th century. Additionally, the AFI ranked the movie second on their 100 Years... 100 Cheers list, behind It's a Wonderful Life. The film was ranked number 34 on AFI's list of the 100 greatest movies of all time, but moved up to number 25 on the 10th Anniversary list. In June 2008, the AFI revealed its "10 Top 10" – the best ten films in ten "classic" American film genres – after polling over 1,500 people from the creative community. To Kill a Mockingbird was acknowledged as the best film in the courtroom drama genre.

American Film Institute lists:

- AFI's 100 Years...100 Movies – #34
- AFI's 100 Years...100 Heroes & Villains:
  - Atticus Finch – #1 Hero
- AFI's 100 Years of Film Scores – #17
- AFI's 100 Years...100 Cheers – #2
- AFI's 100 Years...100 Movies: 10th Anniversary Edition – #25
- AFI's 10 Top 10 – #1 Courtroom Drama

The February 2020 issue of New York Magazine selected To Kill a Mockingbird as among "The Best Movies That Lost Best Picture at the Oscars."

== Music ==
To Kill a Mockingbird

Soundtrack album by Elmer Bernstein
- Released: Early April 1963
- Recorded: August 1–2, 1996, City Halls, Glasgow
- Length: 41:53
- Label: Varèse Sarabande

Elmer Bernstein's score for To Kill a Mockingbird is regarded as one of the greatest film scores and has been recorded three times. The soundtrack was first released in April 1963 on Ava; then Bernstein re-recorded it in the 1970s for his Film Music Collection series; and finally, he recorded the complete score (below) in 1996 with the Royal Scottish National Orchestra for the Varese Sarabande Film Classics series.

== See also ==
- List of American films of 1962
- Trial film
- White savior narrative in film
