= 1997 in comics =

Notable events of 1997 in comics.

== Events ==
- Publisher Blatant Comics founded by Chris Crosby and Bobby Crosby.
- WildStorm established the Cliffhanger imprint.

=== January ===
- January 8: In Italy, the first issue of Fantacomix Day (Eura editoriale) is published, a magazine specialized in Argentine sci-fi comics; it lasts for four issues.
- January 22: In Disney comics magazine Topolino the Mickey Mouse story Chief Casey's Longest Night, by Tito Faraci and Giorgio Cavazzano is published, which marks the debut of Brick Boulder.
- Specific date in January unknown: Peter van Straaten wins his second Inktspotprijs for Best Political Cartoon.
- Aloys Oosterwijk's gag comic Willems Wereld debuts. It will run until 2017.
- In Shadis magazine, the first episode of Dork Tower, by John Kovalic is printed.
- In The Incredible Hulk #449 (Marvel Comics), the Thunderbolts make their debut.
- The first episode of Due by Alessandro Sisti, Corrado Mastrantuono and Paolo Mottura (Walt Disney Italia) is published, in which two central figures of PKNA, the evil computer Due and the mysterious scientist and businessman Everett Ducklair, make their debut. Later in the year, the series’ supporting cast is enriched by several other recurring characters, such as the android Odin Eidolon and the secret agent Mary Ann Flagstar.

=== March ===
- March 19: Sonic the Hedgehog #47 "End Game" is released. Similar to the long-time controversy of Gwen Stacy's death, this issue received backlash for the attempt of "killing off" the comic's heroine Princess Sally Acorn from the comics before Archie Comics was urged to revive Sally by changing the result that she was put in a coma and survived three issues later.
- March 20: Liberty meadows by Frank Cho makes its debut.
- March 22: The final episode of Steve Dowling's long-running newspaper comic Garth is published.
- The final episode of Daniel Clowes' Ghost World is prepublished in Eightball. In the same issue Clowes publishes his essay Modern Cartoonist.
- In Italy, La Lunga Notte dell’Investigatore Merlo (Detective Merlo's long night), by Leo Ortolani (Edizioni Bande Dessinée) is first published, a parody of Humphrey Bogart’s movies.

=== April ===
- April 1:
  - Tony Barbieri and Bill Wray's satirical teenage comic Monroe makes its debut in the 356th issue of Mad. It will run until 2010, albeit with a different artist from 2006 on: Tom Fowler.
  - In U.S. newspapers, a comic strip switcheroo takes place, in commemoration of April Fools' Day; several cartoonists trade their signature comic series for the day, among them Ballard Street, For Better or for Worse, Blondie, Shoe, Drabble, Mother Goose and Grimm, Non Sequitur, Jump Start, Garfield, Momma, Baby Blues, Bizarro, 9 Chickweed Lane, The Family Circus and Dilbert.
- April 3: The first issue of Knuckles the Lark legion (later Knuckles the Echidna) by Ken Penders is published.
- In Smoke Magazine, Cigarman, by Sam Gross and Randy Jones, begins publication. It will run until 1998.
- Marvel cancels The Punisher (1995 series) with issue #18
- A history of violence by John Wagner and Vince Locke (Paradox press).
- First issue of the annual magazine Il Grande Diabolik (Astorina).
- First issue of Rat-Man collection (Panini comics) by Leonardo Ortolani.

=== May ===
- May 24: The British girls' magazine Mandy and Judy, who merged in 1991, now merge with Bunty. It will run in this form until 2001.
- First issue of 2020 Visions by Jamie Delano (Vertigo).
- In Cable 45, the crossover Operation: Zero tolerance begins.
- Sergio Bonelli editore launches two new magazines: the semi-annual Agenzia alfa (spin-off of Nathan Never) and the annual I Grandi Comici del Fumetto (The Great Authors of Humor Comics), inaugurated by Cocco Bill Diquaedilà, one of Benito Jacovitti’s last works.

=== June ===
- June 15: Un Copieur Sachant Copier !, by Zidrou and Godi, the first album of the series L'Élève Ducobu is published.
- First issue of Hellboy: wake the devil, by Mike Mignola (Dark Horse).
- Fiftieth anniversary of Scrooge McDuck's first appearance. The event is celebrated by two stories: Secret of the Incas, by Byron Erickson and Giorgio Cavazzano (June 24, Topolino) and A little something special, by Don Rosa (June 26, Anders and Co.).
- Fort Ghost, the first album of the western-fantasy series Magico Vento, by Gianfranco Manfredi (Sergio Bonelli editore).
- The Largo Winch album L’heure du tigre is published, by Jean Van Hamme and Philippe Francq (Dupuis).

=== July ===
- July 7: Jerry Scott and Jim Borgman's Zits makes its debut.
- July 15: In Topolino, the story Paperino e la Macchina della Conoscenza, by Corrado Mastantuono is published, which marks the debut of Bum-Bum Ghigno.
- July 31: The Belgian city Middelkerke starts an annual project where statues of famous Belgian comics characters are placed at the dijk during the summer. The first one to be honoured this way is Jommeke.
- Marvel Comics' Flashback month: all issues were released with the number −1.

=== August ===
- First issue of Major Bummer, by John Arcudi and Doug Mahnke (DC comics).
- The Lucky Luke story OK Corral by Morris, Éric Adam and Xavier Fauche is published.

=== September ===
- September 12 : L’Occhio di Vetro (The Glass Eye) by Carlo Ambrosini, the first album of the mystery-fantasy series Napoleone (Sergio Bonelli) is published.
- The first issue of the second Marvel Team-up series is published.
- The first issue of Transmetropolitan by Waren Ellis and Frank Robertson (Vertigo) is published.
- The XIII album Le Jugement, by William Vance and Jean Van Hamme is first published (Dargaud)

=== October ===
- October 10: In the Danish version of Donald Duck (Anders And & Co.) the story W.H.A.D.A.L.O.T.T.A.J.A.R.G.O.N. by Don Rosa is published, revealing how Huey, Dewey and Louie joined the Junior Woodchunks.
- October 11–12: During the Stripdagen in Haarlem, the Netherlands, Peter Pontiac receives the Stripschapprijs. Sunnya van der Vegt en René van Royen receive the P. Hans Frankfurtherprijs for their book Asterix en de waarheid, about the historicity in Astérix.
- Family Values by Frank Miller (Dark Horse).
- First issue of Ascension, by David Finch and Matt Banning (Top Cow)
- The last complete story of Zanardi (untitled, but known as “Zanardi in the Middle Ages”) by Andrea Pazienza, appears in the Italian magazine Comic Art..
- The giant album Gli uomini in nero (The Man in Black) by Alfredo Castelli and Esposito Bros is published by Sergio Bonelli. It tells the whole story of the Martin Mystere universe, from the fall of Atlantis to the present.

=== November ===
- November 29: Willy Vandersteen's old villa in Kalmthout, Belgium, becomes an interactive children's museum.
- Mayo Kaan takes out newspaper ads claiming to be the original model for Superman, although his allegations were later proven false.
- The Thorgal story La Cage by Jean Van Hamme and Grzegorz Rosiński (Le Lombard) is first published.
- The Blueberry story Ombres sur Tombstone by Jean Giraud (Dargaud) is first published.
- La Pourpre et l'Or by Jean Dufaux and Philippe Delaby (Dargaud), the first album of the Murena series, is published.

=== December ===
- The final issue of the Belgian comics magazine À Suivre is published.
- Marvel returns the Avengers and Fantastic Four to their main continuity in Heroes Reborn: The Return #1–4
- Bad boy by Frank Miller and Simon Bisley (ONI press)

=== Specific date unknown ===
- Finnish comic artist Arja Kajermo launches her gag comic Tuula, which will run until 2019.
- The final album of the Belgian comics series Bessy, originally created by Willy Vandersteen, is published.
- The final episode of the Belgian comics series Tif et Tondu is published, ending it just a year before its 60th birthday.
- The final episode of Howard Rands' newspaper gag comic Twitch appears in print.
- The Day I Swapped My Dad for Two Goldfish by Neil Gaiman and David McKean (White Wolf)
- In Norway, the first strip of Den swarte siden (later, Nemi) by Lise Myhre is published.
- In Italy, number 0 of the series No Name by Davide Barzi and Oskar (Edipierre) is published, a parody of the superhero comics.

== Deaths ==
=== January ===
- January 5:
  - André Franquin, Belgian comics artist (Gaston Lagaffe, Marsupilami, Modeste et Pompon, Idées Noires, continued Spirou and Fantasio), dies at age 73.
  - Frans Piët, Dutch comics artist (Sjors en Sjimmie), dies at age 91.
- January 6: Pétur Bjarnason, Icelandic-Swedish comic artist (Drottning Drusila later retitled Regina), dies at age 50.
- January 8: Normand Hudon, Canadian animator and comics artist (Julien Gagnon), dies at age 67.
- January 25: Dan Barry, American cartoonist and comics artist (Marvel Comics, continued Tarzan, Flash Gordon), dies at age 73.

=== February ===
- February 3: Geoffrey Foladori, Uruguayan comics artist (El Professor Pistacho, Pelopincho y Cachirula, Don Gumersindo, Don Tranquilo y Flia), dies at age 88.
- February 7: Nina Albright, American comics artist (Comandette, continued Miss Victory), dies at age 89.
- February 13: Hans Schlensker (Biff Baker, assisted on Buz Sawyer), dies at age 82.
- February 15: Jack Sparling, Canadian-American comics artist (Claire Voyant, Hap Hopper, Washington Correspondent), dies at age 81.
- February 23: Larry Antonette, aka Dean Carr, American comics artist (Dash Dixon, Bozo and the Baron, Calling the Duke), dies at age 87.
- Specific date unknown: Arthur Horner, Australian-British cartoonist (Colonel Pewter, The Thoughts of Citizen Doe), dies at age 80.

=== March ===
- March 10: Stan Drake, American comics artist (The Heart of Juliet Jones), dies at age 75.

=== April ===
- April 4: Billy Graham, American comics artist (worked on Luke Cage, Black Panther), dies at age 61.
- April 11: Helge Kühn-Nielsen, Danish comics artist, teacher, painter and illustrator, dies at age 76.
- April 16: Roland Topor, French novelist, illustrator, cartoonist, comics artist, film script writer, TV script writer, animator and playwright (Hara-Kiri), dies at age 59.
- April 20: Stamatis L. Polenakis, Greek comic artist and animator (Pipis Papias, Spagorammenos), dies at age 88 or 89.
- April 27: Víctor Arriazu, Spanish comics artist (assisted on El Jabato), dies at age 61 or 62.

=== May ===
- May 1: Sirius, Belgian comics artist (Timour), dies at age 86.
- May 4: Lou Stathis, American comics editor of DC's Vertigo line, dies of complications related to a brain tumor at age 44.
- May 31: Ruth Atkinson, Canadian-American comics artist (Patsy Walker, Millie the Model), dies at age 78.

=== June ===
- June 6: Manny Stallman, American comics artist (various horror comics), dies at age 70.
- June 8: Peggy Zangerle, American painter and comic artist (made comics for Ghost Breakers, Red Dragon Comics and Shadow Comics), dies at age 71.
- June 12: Rémy Bourles, French comics artist (Bob Mallard), dies at age 91.
- June 15: Kim Casali, New Zealand cartoonist and comics artist (Love Is...), dies of bone and liver cancer at age 55.

=== July ===
- July 6: Michele Pepe, Italian comic artist (Fury, Gli Eroi del Mare, worked on Zagor, Martin Mystère), dies at age 50.
- July 8: Clay Geerdes, American writer and photojournalist who extensively covered the underground comix movement (founded Comix World newsletter), dies of liver cancer at age 63.

=== August ===
- August 3: Ralph Graczak, American comic writer and artist (Our Own Oddities), dies at age 87.
- August 19: James Ringrose, Dutch comics artist (Tekko Taks, Blix Kater, Willie en Wop), dies at age 83.

=== September ===
- September 4: Nasjah Djamin, Indonesian illustrator and comics artist (drew a comic book about Hang Tuah), dies at age 72.
- September 15: Lode Pemmelaar, Dutch painter and comics artist (Romila the Velvet Girl), dies at age 54.
- September 25: Josep Toutain, Spanish comics artist and publisher (founder of Selecciones Ilustradas and Toutain-Editor), dies from lung cancer at age 64–65.

=== October ===
- October 8: Zhang Chongren, Chinese artist and sculptor (inspiration for the Tintin character Chang Chong-Chen), dies at age 91.
- October 16: Dick Cavalli, American comics artist and cartoonist (Winthrop, continued Norbert), dies at age 74.
- October 18: Milt Neil, American animator and comics artist (the Howdy Doody comic strip), dies at age 83.
- October 22: Per Lygum, Danish animator and comics artist (Planckton), dies at age 64.
- October 30: Nikola Mitrovic, AKA Kokan, Serbian comic artist, dies at age 73.

=== November ===
- November 9: Leonard Matthews, British comics artist (Daffy the Cowboy Tec) and publisher, dies at age 83.
- November 13: Samm Schwartz, American comics artist (Jughead) stories for Archie Comics, dies at age 75.
- November 26: Keats Petree, American illustrator and comics artist (worked on The Lone Ranger, Sally the Sleuth, Nick Haliday), dies at age 78.
- November: Evelyn Flinders, British comics artist (The Silent Three), dies at age 97.

=== December ===
- December 3: Benito Jacovitti, Italian comics artist (Cocco Bill, Zorry Kid), dies at age 74.
- December 8: Walter Molino, Italian illustrator and comics artist (Virus, Il Mago della Foresta Morta, Captain l'Audace, continued Kit Carson), dies at age 82.
- December 11: Heinz Schubel, German illustrator and comics artist (Lurchi), dies at age 91.
- December 13: Samm Schwartz, American comics artist (continued Archie Comics), dies at age 77.

=== Specific date unknown ===
- Carol Carlson, American comics artist (The Adventures of Waddles), dies at age 84 or 85.
- Dennis Ellefson, American comics artist, dies at age 59 or 60.
- Kerstin Frykstrand, Swedish illustrator and comics artist (Muff och Tuff), dies at age 95 or 96.
- Frank Little, American animator and comics artist (worked for Jerry Iger's studio), dies at age 90.
- Armand Panis, A.K.A. Sinap, Belgian comics artist, caricaturist and cartoonist (Klopstok), dies at age 89 or 90.
- Jorge Pérez Del Castillo, Chilean-Argentine comics artist, dies at age 73 or 74.
- Alan Philpott, British comic artist (Robot Archie, The Deathless Men), dies at age 82 or 83.
- Roex, A.K.A. Roger Exelmans, Belgian comics artist (continued Rikske en Fikske), dies at age 60.
- Bernard Segal, A.K.A. "Seeg", American painter and comics artist (Honey and Hank, also known as Elsworth), dies at age 78 or 79.
- George Smits, A.K.A. 'Toet', Belgian painter, experimental musician and comics artist (De avonturen van Jan, member of Ercola), dies at age 52 or 53.
- Tony Velasquez, Filipino comics artist (Kenkoy), dies at age 86.
- Roland Venet, aka Rol, French comics artist (Wa-Pi-Ti), dies at age 77 or 78.

== Conventions ==
- January 23–26: Angoulême International Comics Festival (Angoulême, France)
- February 1: Alternative Press Expo (San Jose, California) — also featured the first LuluCon, organized by Friends of Lulu
- March: Big Apple Comic Con (Church of St. Paul the Apostle, New York City)
- March 15–16: UKCAC (Institute of Education, London, England) — guests include Joe Kubert and Dan Clowes; presentation of the inaugural National Comics Awards by Paul Gambaccini and Jonathan Ross
- March 15–16: MegaCon (Orange County Convention Center, Orlando, Florida): guests include J. Michael Straczynski and Peter David
- March 21–23: Motor City Comic Con I (Novi Expo Center, Novi, Michigan)
- April: Northampton Comic Convention (Northampton, Massachusetts)
- April 18–20: Pittsburgh Comicon (Monroeville ExpoMart, Monroeville, Pennsylvania) — guests include David Prowse and Carmen Electra
- April 25–27: WonderCon (Oakland, California)
- Summer: Canadian National Comic Book Exposition (Metro Toronto Convention Centre, Toronto, Ontario, Canada) — c. 3,800 attendees; guests include Marc Silvestri, Dwayne Turner, Carlos Pacheco, Dale Keown, David Wohl, and Rich Buckler
- June 12–15: Heroes Convention (Charlotte Convention Center, Charlotte, North Carolina)
- June 26–29: Dragon Con (Inforum Convention Center/Westin Peachtree Plaza/Atlanta Civic Center, Atlanta, Georgia) — 18,000 attendees
- July 4–6: Chicago Comicon (Rosemont Convention Center, Rosemont, Illinois) — c. 5,000 attendees; convention sold to Wizard Entertainment
- July 17–20: Comic-Con International (San Diego Convention Center, San Diego, California) — 40,000 attendees; special guests include Brent Anderson, Dick Ayers, Steve Bissette, Terry Brooks, Kurt Busiek, Evan Dorkin, Sarah Dyer, Steven Hughes, Peter Kuper, David Lapham, Carol Lay, Joseph Michael Linsner, Ralph McQuarrie, Linda Medley, Michael Moorcock, George Pérez, Brian Pulido, Alex Ross, R.A. Salvatore, Kevin Smith, George Tuska, Jhonen Vasquez, Paul Verhoeven, Mark Waid, and Al Williamson
- July 19-20: "EuroCAPTION" (Oxford Union Society, Oxford, England) — guests include France's David B, Spain's Max, and the Netherlands' Maaike Hartjes
- September 18–20: International Comics and Animation Festival (ICAF) (Georgetown University (Washington, D.C.) — guests include Florence Cestac, Farid Boudjellal, Lucien Czuga & Roger Leiner, Gerrit de Jager, Michèle Laframboise, Patrick McDonnell, Tome, Jean-Marc Rochette, Karoline Schreiber, and Frank Cho (special guest); mostly held in conjunction with SPX (see below)
- September 19–21: Small Press Expo (SPX) (Quality Hotel, Silver Spring, Maryland) — mostly held in conjunction with ICAF (see above)
- October–November: FIBDA (Amadora, Portugal) — eighth annual edition; special guests include Jean-Claude Mézières Pierre Christin, François Schuiten, Benoît Peeters, Enki Bilal, André Juillard, Ted Benoît, Jean Van Hamme, Theo van den Boogaard, Kevin O'Neill, and Miguelanxo Prado
- October 11–12: Motor City Comic Con II (Dearborn Civic Center, Dearborn, Michigan)
- October 17: Alternative Comics Expo (A.C.E.) (Manchester Center, Vermont) — guests include Joe Chiappetta
- November 29–30: Mid-Ohio Con (Adam's Mark Hotel, Columbus, Ohio) — guests include John Byrne, Roger Stern, Kurt Busiek, Brent Anderson, Sergio Aragonés, Mark Evanier, Mart Nodell, Tony Isabella, Joseph Michael Linsner, Sheldon Moldoff, Terry Moore, Steve Lieber, Jim Ottaviani, Paul Smith, Alvin Schwartz, Murphy Anderson, and Bernie Wrightson

== Exhibitions ==
- September 18–December 24: "Art and Provocation: Images from Rebels" (Boulder Museum of Contemporary Art, Boulder, Colorado) — group exhibition focusing on Robert Crumb and Philip Guston, along with other artists, including Sue Coe, Georganne Deen, Debbie Drechsler, Glenn Head, and Amy Sillman

== First issues by title ==
Clover
Release: by Kodansha (Amie). Authors: Clamp

Desert Punk
Release: August 5 by Enterbrain (Comic Beam). Author: Usune Masatoshi

Peach Girl
Release: by Kodansha (Bessatsu Friend). Author: Miwa Ueda

=== DC Comics ===
Jack Kirby's Fourth World by John Byrne

Young Heroes in Love

The Flintstones and The Jetsons

Transmetropolitan

JLA: Year One by Mark Waid and Barry Kitson. 12-issue maxi-series
