= Love Is... =

Comic strip

Love is...
- Love Is... comic strip from May 25, 2007
- Author: Kim Casali/Bill Asprey
- Website: Official website
- Current status/schedule: Running/Daily
- Launch date: January 5, 1970
- Syndicate(s): Tribune Content Agency
- Genre: Comedy/Romance

Love Is... is a comic strip created by New Zealand cartoonist Kim Casali (née Grove) in the 1960s. The cartoons originated from a series of love notes that Grove drew for her future husband, Roberto Casali. They were published in booklets in the late 1960s before appearing in strip form in a newspaper in 1970, under the pen name "Kim". They were syndicated soon after and the strip is syndicated worldwide today by Tribune Content Agency. One of her most famous drawings, "Love Is...being able to say you are sorry", published on February 9, 1972, was marketed internationally for many years in print, on cards and on souvenirs. The beginning of the strip coincided closely with the 1970 film Love Story. The film's signature line is "Love means never having to say you're sorry." At the height of their popularity in the early to mid 1970s, the cartoons were earning Casali around five to six million dollars annually.

Roberto Casali was diagnosed with terminal cancer in 1975 and Kim stopped working on the cartoon to spend more time with him. Casali commissioned London-based British cartoonist Bill Asprey to take over the writing and drawing of the daily cartoons for her, under her pen name. Asprey has produced the cartoon continuously since 1975. Upon her death in 1997, Casali's son Stefano took over Minikim, the company which handles the intellectual rights.

== Comic strip features ==
Love Is... is a single-frame strip. The caption for each strip begins with the phrase "love is..." in the upper left corner, with the thought completed at the bottom, below an illustration, usually of the man and the woman who are the main characters. Each strip is independent of those before and after; there are no ongoing storylines.

The two main characters are a man and a woman, drawn simply with oversize heads and eyes. They are typically depicted unclothed, unless clothing is needed for the scene depicted, such as a military uniform for the man, or an apron for the woman. The figures have no primary or secondary sexual features shown other than the woman having dots for nipples. He is identified by his short black hair, and she by her light waist-length hair. The characters have been featured in various stages of romance: just meeting, dating, as a young married couple, and in old age. Although not usually named, a 1974 strip identifies the woman as "Kim", and a 1971 strip has her writing the letter "R" in the beach sand, both references to original cartoonist Kim Casali and her husband Roberto.

The strip occasionally includes members of the couple's family. Their two children may appear as either infants or pre-teens. The gray-haired elderly parents of either partner are also seen. Pet dogs and cats have appeared, sometimes deceased to illustrate love for a lost pet. Friends and others occasionally appear, generally distinguished from the main characters by their hair color and style.

Although the strip generally deals with personal relationship issues, sometimes there are messages related to environment conservation and teaching their kids lessons about the environment. In one of the strips the characters are shown campaigning to save children.

== Alternate versions ==
In the 1980s an alternate version of the strip ran in the "Cartoons" paper in the British newspaper the Mail on Sunday. This was a three- or four-panel strip, with the male and female characters drawn fully clothed.

The Turkish version of the strip (Şıpsevdi) is sold in form of small pieces of comic strips wrapped around gum.

== Video game ==
A video game, titled Love Is... in Bloom: The Flower Shop Garden, was released in 2009 on the Nintendo DS and Nintendo Wii.

== See also ==
- Philosophy of love
