= What's Up, Doc? (1972 film) =

1972 film by Peter Bogdanovich

- Theatrical release poster by Bill Gold
- Directed by: Peter Bogdanovich
- Screenplay by: Buck Henry; David Newman; Robert Benton
- Story by: Peter Bogdanovich
- Produced by: Peter Bogdanovich
- Starring: Barbra Streisand; Ryan O'Neal; Kenneth Mars; Austin Pendleton; Sorrell Booke; Michael Murphy; Madeline Kahn
- Cinematography: Laszlo Kovacs
- Edited by: Verna Fields
- Music by: Artie Butler
- Production company: Saticoy Productions
- Distributed by: Warner Bros. Pictures
- Release date: March 9, 1972 (New York City)
- Running time: 94 minutes
- Country: United States
- Language: English
- Budget: $4 million
- Box office: $66 million

What's Up, Doc? is a 1972 American screwball comedy film directed by Peter Bogdanovich, and starring Barbra Streisand and Ryan O'Neal. It was intended to pay homage to comedy films of the 1920s, '30s, and '40s, especially Bringing Up Baby and Warner Bros. Bugs Bunny cartoons. The film was very loosely based on the 1971 novel A Glimpse of Tiger by Herman Raucher—only a few character traits were used.

What's Up, Doc? was a success, and became the third highest-grossing film of 1972. It won the Writers Guild of America (WGA) 1973 "Best Comedy Written Directly for the Screen" award for Buck Henry, David Newman, and Robert Benton. What's Up, Doc? was ranked number 61 on the list of the 100 greatest American comedies published by the American Film Institute (AFI), number 68 on the AFI's list of 100 greatest love stories in American cinema, and number 58 on the list of the WGA's 101 Funniest Screenplays published by the Writers Guild of America.

== Plot ==
Dr. Howard Bannister, a musicologist from the Iowa Conservatory of Music in Ames, Iowa, has travelled to San Francisco to compete for a research grant offered by Frederick Larrabee. Howard is accompanied by his tightly wound, overbearing fiancée Eunice Burns. As the two check into the Hotel Bristol, Howard runs into the charming trouble-magnet Judy Maxwell in the hotel's drugstore. She never finished college, but nevertheless has amassed a considerable amount of knowledge from all of the academic institutions from which she was expelled. She begins to pursue Howard and lodges herself in the hotel without paying.

Howard has brought with him a plaid overnight bag containing igneous "tambula" rocks that have certain musical properties, unaware that three other parties are staying on the same floor of the Bristol with identical bags. The mysterious "Mr. Smith" has illegally obtained a bag containing top-secret government papers, which government agent "Mr. Jones" is on a mission to recover. Wealthy socialite Mrs. Van Hoskins has a bag containing her sizable collection of valuable jewels that hotel employees Harry and Fritz attempt to steal. Judy's bag is filled with her clothing and a large dictionary. Over the course of the evening, the four parties unwittingly take one another's bags.

Judy, masquerading as Eunice at the musicologists' banquet, uses her humor, wit, and academic knowledge to charm everyone except Howard's Croatian competitor, Hugh Simon. Unable to overcome Judy's pretense—and realizing Larrabee's infatuation with her might win him the grant—Howard denies knowing the real Eunice when she hysterically tries to enter the banquet. Judy later intrudes into Howard's hotel room. His struggle to hide her presence from Eunice while the thieves attempt to recover the jewels leads to a fire and the destruction of the room. Ultimately, Howard ends up with the jewels, Judy with the documents, Mr. Smith with Judy's clothes, and the thieves with the rocks.

The following day, everyone makes their way to a reception in Larrabee's upscale Victorian home, where a fight breaks out involving guns, furnishings, and thrown pies. Howard and Judy take all four bags and flee through San Francisco, first on a delivery bike, and then in a decorated Volkswagen Beetle stolen from a wedding party, pursued by Mr. Smith, Mr. Jones and the jewel thieves, who also have taken Eunice, Larrabee and Simon hostage. They go through Chinatown disrupting a parade, down Lombard Street, through a panel of glass, through wet cement, and eventually into San Francisco Bay at the ferry landing, after causing several collisions.

Everyone ends up in a courtroom, where Judge Maxwell, already on the brink of a nervous breakdown, tries to clear up the matter but only succeeds in finding his daughter Judy as the cause of all the trouble. Later, after the bags have been returned to their rightful owners, Howard and Judy find themselves at the airport again. "Mr. Smith" is pursuing "Mr. Jones", who is now back in possession of the government papers, while the thieves plan their escape from the country. Mrs. Van Hoskins pays for the considerable damage and splits the remaining $50 of the reward she had offered among those who helped retrieve her jewels. Eunice appears with Larrabee and Simon, who won the grant. However, he is exposed by Judy as a plagiarist, thus getting Howard the grant after all. Eunice leaves Howard for Larrabee.

Howard boards a plane back to Iowa alone, only to find Judy in the seat behind him. He declares his love for her and apologizes for what he said earlier. Judy responds, "Love means never having to say you're sorry," (Note: A reference to the 1970 film Love Story, also starring Ryan O'Neal) to which Howard replies, "That's the dumbest thing I've ever heard." As they kiss, a scene from the Looney Tunes cartoon What's Up, Doc? is screened on the plane.

== Cast ==
- Barbra Streisand as Judy Maxwell
- Ryan O'Neal as Howard Bannister
- Madeline Kahn as Eunice Burns
- Kenneth Mars as Hugh Simon
- Austin Pendleton as Frederick Larrabee
- Michael Murphy as Mr. Smith
- Phil Roth as Mr. Jones
- Sorrell Booke as Harry
- Stefan Gierasch as Fritz
- Mabel Albertson as Mrs. Van Hoskins
- Liam Dunn as Judge Maxwell
- John Hillerman as Kaltenborn, hotel manager
- George Morfogen as Rudy, headwaiter
- Graham Jarvis as Bailiff
- Randy Quaid as Professor Hosquith
- M. Emmet Walsh as Arresting officer
- John Byner as Man at the hotel banquet (uncredited)
- Mort Thompson as Airport cab driver (and stunts)
- Mel Blanc as the voices of Bugs Bunny and Porky Pig (archive footage, uncredited)
- Arthur Q. Bryan as the voice of Elmer Fudd (archive footage, uncredited)

== Production ==
=== Development and writing ===
John Calley, who was then head of production, called me into his office and said: "Look, Barbra really wants to work with you. If you were going to make a picture with Barbra Streisand, what kind of picture would you do?" I said: "Oh, I don't know, kind of a screwball comedy, something like Bringing Up Baby: daffy girl, square professor, everything works out all right." He said, "Do it."

— Peter Bogdanovich, to Gregg Kilday

So we had to work fast on the script. Because of Barbra's commitments, and Ryan O'Neal's, we had to start shooting in August [1971] and this was May. We got a script done with two different sets of writers—first, Robert Benton and David Newman who did Bonnie and Clyde, and then Buck Henry. Both of them went through three drafts. So there was quite a bit of work.

— Peter Bogdanovich, to Gordon Gow

=== Filming ===
Polly Platt, Bogdanovich's former wife, was the production designer.

The opening and ending scenes were filmed at the San Francisco International Airport (SFO) in the South Terminal (now Terminal 1). The opening scene was filmed in the downstairs TWA Baggage Claim area, and the next to last scene was filmed in the upstairs departure area beneath the arrival/departure board and at the flight insurance counter.

The San Francisco Hilton was a filming location for the Bristol Hotel, with the lobby, drugstore, ballroom, seventeenth floor, and partly-finished top floor of the new 46-story 1971 second tower addition (the "As Time Goes By" scene). The exterior of the hotel, where Streisand is hanging from a ledge, was shot in Westwood, Los Angeles. The view from the Bristol Hotel, looking down, is from the Saint Francis Hotel looking at Geary Street.

The San Francisco setting was chosen to allow an elaborate comic spoof of the San Francisco car chase in the hit 1968 film Bullitt. Bogdanovich claims the rousing chase sequence accounted for one-fourth of the film's $4 million budget. The classic "plate glass" scene, in which O'Neal and Streisand are pedaling on a stolen grocery store delivery bicycle, was filmed at Balboa and 23rd Avenue in the Richmond District. In another scene, their out of control bike goes down Clay Street in Chinatown. The Volkswagen Beetle is stolen from the curb in front of Saint Peter and Paul Church at Washington Square Park, and the Beetle hides on a car carrier on Sacramento Street just west of Van Ness Avenue, in an area where many car dealerships were once located (Van Ness was San Francisco's "Auto Row"). The production did not have permission from the city to drive cars down the concrete steps in Alta Plaza Park in San Francisco; these were badly damaged during filming and still show the scars today. At the end of the car chase, almost everyone ends up foundering in San Francisco Bay—except O'Neal and Streisand, comfortably afloat in the Volkswagen Beetle. During the making of this scene, the actor Sorrell Booke almost drowned in the Bay.

The final scene on board a TWA Boeing 707 shows O'Neal looking out the righthand window showing the Marina District and the Embarcadero Freeway.

== Music ==
As with Bringing Up Baby, all the music is diegetic; there is no underscoring anywhere in the film.

Although What's Up, Doc? is not a musical, it contains some singing and other musical moments. The song "You're the Top" from the musical Anything Goes is sung as a solo during the opening credits by Streisand, and as a duet during the closing credits by Streisand and O'Neal. The same Cole Porter musical supplied at least two other tunes played as background music: "Anything Goes" and "I Get a Kick Out of You", heard during the first hotel lobby scene.

"Funiculì, Funiculà" is whistled by the Streisand character as she crosses the street, following the pizza delivery man, into the Bristol Hotel before the first hotel lobby scene.

About two-thirds of the way into the film, Howard accompanies Judy at a piano (on a floor of the Hotel Bristol apparently under construction or renovation) as she sings the beginning of "As Time Goes By" (made famous in the film Casablanca). The scene includes Streisand imitating Humphrey Bogart with the line, "Of all the gin joints, in all the towns, in all the world, he walks into mine. Play it, Sam."

Musical in-jokes appear throughout the film. Over-the-top Muzak-styled elevator music featuring Cole Porter's songs is used throughout the hotel elevator scenes. In the chase scene, a Chinese marching band is inexplicably playing the Mexican tune "La Cucaracha" (although, in certain prints, it sounds more like "Deep in the Heart of Texas") on German glockenspiels. At the American Musicologists' banquet, themes from Thoinot Arbeau's Orchésographie can be heard in the background, incongruously played on a Hammond organ and a sitar.

George Gershwin's "Someone to Watch over Me" is whistled by Streisand outside the hotel drug store.

The Bugs Bunny number—derived from his characteristic tagline—that gives the movie its title, appears as well, with the original animation, in the last scene. Instrumental versions of "Please Don't Talk About Me When I'm Gone", an old Tin Pan Alley hit that had appeared in the Looney Tunes cartoon One Froggy Evening, are background music during the opening scene in the airport.

== Release ==
=== Theatrical ===
The film opened at Radio City Music Hall in New York City on March 9, 1972.

=== Home media ===
What's Up, Doc? was originally released on VHS in 1982.

As part of a collector's box set of Streisand's films, it was released on DVD in July 2003 and then on Blu-ray in August 2010.

== Reception ==
=== Box office ===
In the United States and Canada, the film grossed $66 million against a budget of $4 million. It became the third highest-grossing film of the year, ranking behind The Godfather and The Poseidon Adventure.

=== Critical response ===
On the review aggregator website Rotten Tomatoes, the film holds an approval rating of 88% based on 40 reviews, with an average rating of 7.4/10. The website's critical consensus reads, "Barbra Streisand was never more likable than in this energetic, often hilarious screwball farce from director Peter Bogdanovich." Metacritic, which uses a weighted average, assigned the film a score of 73 out of 100, based on 15 critics, indicating "generally favorable" reviews.

In his review of What's Up, Doc?, critic John Simon (upon whom, according to director Bogdanovich, the character of Hugh Simon was based) said that Streisand "look[ed] like a cross between an aardvark and an albino rat surmounted by a platinum-coated horse bun," and called the film a heavy-handed attempt at nostalgia.

The film was re-released in the United States in 1973 and earned an additional $3 million in theatrical rentals and in 1975, earning an additional $6 million.

=== Accolades ===
The film won the Writers Guild of America 1973 "Best Comedy Written Directly for the Screen" award for writers Buck Henry, David Newman and Robert Benton. Madeline Kahn was nominated for the Golden Globe Award for New Star of the Year – Actress.

=== Year-end lists ===
The film is recognized by American Film Institute in these lists:

- 2000: AFI's 100 Years...100 Laughs – No. 61
- 2002: AFI's 100 Years...100 Passions – No. 68

== Novelization ==
Smith, Carole (1972). What's up Doc?. Avon Books. ISBN 0380024462.
