= Cip l'arcipoliziotto =

- Cip and Zagar

Creative team
- Created by: Benito Jacovitti

Cip l'arcipoliziotto (also spelled as "Cip l'arcipoliziottto" or "l'arcipoliziotto Cip") is the title character of a comic strip series.

The comic was created by Benito Jacovitti in 1945.

It is a zany parody of traditional crime-noir literature. It features a little, bald and scorbutic detective that, helped by his loyal assistant Gallina ("Chicken"), try to catch Zagar, a black-dressed criminal that is an expert in disguises.

The comics were published in the comic magazines Il Vittorioso, Gli Albi del Vittorioso and Il Giornalino. Cip, Gallina and Zagar were also recurring characters of Diario Vitt, the illustrated diary that Jacovitti made almost each year from 1950 to 1980.
