= Il Giorno dei Ragazzi =

Comic magazine in Italy (1957–1968)

- Categories: Comic magazine
- Frequency: Weekly
- Founded: 1957
- First issue: 28 March 1957
- Final issue: December 1968
- Language: Italian

Il Giorno dei Ragazzi was a weekly comic supplement magazine of the Italian newspaper Il Giorno, published between 1957 and 1968.

== History and profile ==
The comic magazine debuted on 28 March 1957. It was originally intended as the Italian version of the British children's periodical Eagle, of which it published several series such as Dan Dare, Pilot of the Future, Storm Nelson and Frank Humphris' Riders of the Range. It also presented a significant Italian production, mainly of humorous genre, which included Benito Jacovitti's Cocco Bill, Gionni Galassia and Tom Ficcanaso, Bruno Bozzetto's comic versions of West and Soda and VIP my Brother Superman, Giovanni Manca's Pier Cloruro de' Lambicchi, Poldo e Poldino by Andrea Lavezzolo and Giuseppe Perego, I Naufraghi by Pier Carpi and Sergio Zaniboni.

In the late 1966 the contract with Eagle expired, and subsequently many series abruptly disappeared; the magazine adopted a bedsheet format in January 1967 and a tabloid format in 1968, but the sales kept to decline, and the magazine finally closed in December 1968, replaced by Giochi-Quiz, a puzzle supplement.

In 1993 Il Giorno tried to resurrect the brand, creating a weekly comic supplement titled Il Giorno Ragazzi. After 22 issues, the supplement was incorporated in the pages of the newspaper, before being eventually dismissed after forty issues.

== See also ==
- List of magazines in Italy
