= Kim Casali =

New Zealand cartoonist

Kim Casali (9 September 1941 – 15 June 1997) was a New Zealand cartoonist who created the syndicated cartoon feature Love Is..., originally as love notes to her future husband, in the late 1960s.

In one of the first cases of its kind, Casali gave birth to a child sixteen months after the death of her husband, having been artificially inseminated using his stored frozen sperm. The case, which predated the Warnock Report, gave rise to legal discussions regarding the baby's rights of inheritance, and made front-page news across the world. The birth split public opinion and although Casali received "hundreds of letters applauding her bravery", some disagreed with her actions, including the Vatican newspaper L'Osservatore Romano which wrote that it was "against evangelical morality".

== Early career ==
Born Marilyn Judith Grove in Auckland, New Zealand, Casali left home aged nineteen to travel around Australia, Europe and the United States. In 1967 she moved to Los Angeles where she met and began a relationship with Roberto Alfredo Vincenzo Casali, an Italian computer engineer, at a ski-club where they were both taking lessons. Casali had been drawing cartoons of humorous incidents on the ski slopes, which Roberto encouraged, and she soon began adding cartoon illustrations to messages which she left for him.

The very first drawing was created as a "signature" to a note, and represented Casali herself with freckles, large eyes and long fair hair. She said later of these cartoons: "I began making little drawings to express how I felt... It was a little bit like keeping a diary that described how my feelings had grown." In the September 1981 Cartoonist Profiles magazine she said: "I drew a round blob of a girl who was supposed to be me, the one who was feeling all these fantastic things. Then I added a blob of a boy who was the reason I was feeling these things."

== Syndication and success ==
Fourth edition print of one of the many LOVE IS.... books written and drawn by Kim Grove, published by Signette. The frontispiece carries the message “FOR MY MOTHER”.

Casali's obituary published in The Times related that after she and Roberto became engaged, Casali took a job as a receptionist for a design company, "and made up little booklets of her winsome cartoons, which she sold for a dollar apiece. Word soon spread and the demand for Love is... escalated. Roberto recognised their commercial potential and showed them to an American journalist." Although other sources differ regarding whether it was Roberto or Casali herself who first showed the cartoons to an acquaintance working for the Los Angeles Times, the newspaper picked them up for publication and published the first of the series on 5 January 1970, under the pen name "Kim". The cartoon's release coincided with the wave of success of the novel Love Story (1970) by Erich Segal, and the subsequent movie of the same name starring Ali MacGraw as a girl dying of an incurable disease and Ryan O'Neal as the student who worshiped her. The film's slogan was "Love means never having to say you're sorry." Casali altered it into one of her most famous cartoons: "Love is... being able to say you're sorry."

While the cartoons proved to be very popular and were soon syndicated in the United States and overseas, being published in newspapers in fifty countries world-wide, Roberto's company had closed down and the couple "found themselves living in the US illegally, 'trying to find jobs that would keep us one step ahead of the Immigration Department'". By 1971 they had travelled to New Zealand, where they were married on 24 July 1971 at St. Andrew's Church, Epsom, Auckland – the same church in which her parents were married in 1936. Casali wore a crown of daisies and a shoulder-length veil that she had previously drawn on 'her' character in the cartoon. At the height of their popularity in the 1970s, the cartoons were earning Casali £4–5 million annually.

== Bereavement and 'miracle' baby ==
By 1974 the couple had two sons, Stefano and Dario, and planned to have two more children. In 1975 Roberto was diagnosed with testicular cancer. Casali commissioned London-based English cartoonist Bill Asprey to take over the writing and drawing of the daily cartoons for her, under her signature. Asprey has produced the cartoon continuously since 1975.

Roberto opted for surgery at the end of 1975 in order to prolong his life. Casali said: "We were talking about Christmas presents and I told Roberto I didn't want another diamond ring, I wanted another baby." They decided "...that we would store some sperm just in case I didn't get pregnant before Roberto died. I knew he had only a few months to live, so we stored some sperm immediately." Roberto died in March 1976, aged 31. Despite initial opposition from the medical profession she underwent several treatments of artificial insemination at a Cambridge clinic, and gave birth to son Milo Roberto Andrea sixteen months later, on 10 July 1977. She said at the time: "Roberto and I were very anxious to provide a brother or sister to our two sons. Now, thanks to the care and patience of the doctors, it has been made possible for me to have another reminder of my wonderful husband." British newspapers called Milo the "miracle baby". The birth announcement consisted of a simple card drawn by Casali with the Love is... girl pushing a pram on the front, with the inscription inside: "Proudly presenting Milo Roberto. Parents: Kim and the late Roberto (posthumously by artificial insemination)".

== Later life ==
In the mid-1980s Casali moved the family to New South Wales, Australia, and bought a farm north of Sydney where she bred Arabian horses for several years. In 1990 she returned to England and settled in Leatherhead, Surrey. In 1996 Diane Blood, a widow, sought impregnation with her husband's sperm, and Casali gave a rare interview in which she "deplored the courts' involvement in Mrs Blood's case: such matters, she said, should be dealt with privately." Casali died due to cancer of the bone and liver in 1997.
