= Chick flick =

Slang term for romantic film genre catering to young women

Chick flick is a slang term for the film genre catered specifically to women's interests, and is marketed toward female demographics. They generally tend to appeal more to a younger female audience and deal mainly with love and romance. Although many types of films may be directed toward a female audience, the term "chick flick" is typically used only in reference to films that contain personal drama and emotion or themes that are relationship-based (although not necessarily romantic, as films may focus on parent-child or friend relationships). Chick flicks often are released en masse around Valentine's Day.

== History ==
The term "chick flick" was not widely used until the 1980s and 1990s. It has its roots in the "women's pictures" of the early twentieth century, which portrays the woman as a victim and housewife, and later the film noir of the 1940s and early 1950s, which portrays the threat of sexualized women. In the 1950s, many women who were in the workforce during World War II faced the transition back into the home. Brandon French notes that the women's films of the 1950s "shed light on a different cluster of issues and situations women faced in their transition from the forties to the sixties: romance, courtship, work, marriage, sex, motherhood, divorce, loneliness, adultery, alcoholism, widowhood, heroism, madness and ambition."

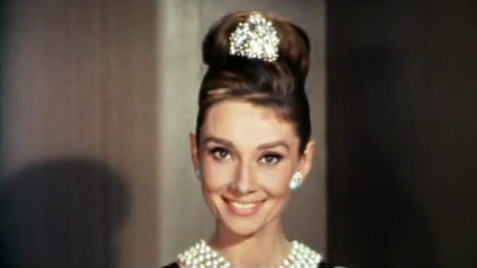
Audrey Hepburn in Breakfast at Tiffany's (1961), an early example of the chick flick

The film Breakfast at Tiffany's (1961), commonly known as one of the "classic" films from the golden age of cinema, is sometimes considered an early chick flick due to common elements such as dealing with loneliness, obsessive materialism, and happy endings. Author Molly Haskell has suggested that chick flicks are very different from the women's films of the 1940s and 1950s in that they now "sing a different tune." She feels that they are "more defiant and upbeat, post-modern and post-feminist."

In the United States in the 1980s, a succession of teenage drama pictures also labeled as chick flicks were released, many by director John Hughes. These often had a different and more realistic tone than previous chick flicks, with dramatic elements such as abortion and personal alienation being included.

Several chick flicks have been patterned after the story of Cinderella and other fairy tales (e.g. A Cinderella Story (2004), Ever After (1998) and Pretty Woman (1990)), or even Shakespeare in the case of She's the Man (2006) and 10 Things I Hate About You (1999). In addition, a large number are adapted from popular novels (e.g. The Princess Diaries (2001) and The Devil Wears Prada (2006)) and literary classics (e.g. Little Women (1994)). While most films that are considered chick flicks are lighthearted, some suspense films also fall under this category, such as What Lies Beneath (2000).

== Evolution and controversy ==
These works have risen since the 1980s, mostly noticed in the early 2000s, and continued to evolve through the 2010s and early 2020s. In its early development, the films were created as white-female-targeted films, primarily involving white-female characters, topics, and interests.

As the genre developed, there was repetitiveness in the plot and characters of these productions. "Chick flicks" often began with single characters, who soon after unexpectedly meeting a suitable and charming significant other, their lives took a turn for the better.

The first productions of this genre were not initially labeled as "chick flicks"; they were just known as "Girly Films". "What sets it apart from other films geared towards a female is its focus on consumer culture.". Films of the genre such as Clueless (1995), The Princess Diaries (2001), and Mean Girls (2004) act as evidence of such. In all of them, buying feminine clothes, makeup, or shoes is portrayed as a large part of women's identities. Women are often portrayed as overly emotional and dependent on men; reinforcing patriarchal societal expectations that women should prioritize finding a romantic partner and getting married. These expectations can be interpreted from films such as He’s Just Not That Into You (2009) and The Notebook (2004).

Many believe that the content of this genre in the industry is more inclusive than discriminating. Different varieties of the female protagonist and plot themes are being noted more often. The representation of women in noticeable male-dominated professions and/or positions is seen in films such as Legally Blonde (2001) and The Proposal (2009). There is a broadening of topics the films portray in films such as The Edge of Seventeen (2016) which “explores themes such as loss, grief, and depression, but in a dry, humorous and cutting fashion.” These films have become a vehicle for other issues in our present society including homophobia and women's rights. This can be seen in films including, but not limited to Love, Simon (2018) and Lady Bird (2017). The industry has evolved the genre from solely portraying soapy romance stories to a focus on more realistic hardships.

== Critique of the genre ==
The term chick flick has generated several negative responses from the modern feminist community. The word chick at the height of the women's liberation movement in the 1970s was considered an insult directed towards women. "Chick" was used to demean women, casting them as delicate creatures in need of protection from men. The affiliation of chick with chick flicks has resulted in an immediate negative response to many women and feminists.

When a movie is branded with the title of 'chick flick,' for many it diminishes the credibility of a film, inherently saying that the movie is cheesy, predictable and has a poor plot. This labeling is specifically seen with movies that have subject matters that revolve around women. Most criticisms of the genre concentrate on the negative consequences that arise from gendering certain interests, in this case, film. Author of The Chick Flick Paradox: Derogatory? Feminist? or Both? Natalia Thompson states that chick flicks are "an attempt to lump together an entire gender's interests into one genre".

Many critics argue that unnecessary gendering can negatively affect many different social groups. There is evidence from Russian social scientist Natal'ia Rimashevskaia that gender stereotypes further perpetuated by the media can lead to discrimination against women and limit their "human and intellectual potential". More criticisms of the term arise from the actual content of the films in the chick flick genre and how the content affects society's perception of women. Some say that chick flicks are microaggressions, actions or exchanges that degrade a person based on their membership in a "race, gender, age, and ability".

Film critics take issue with the content most chick flicks have in common. Although the subcategories represent different plotlines, they all share several characteristics. Many chick flicks can have the "ironic, self-deprecating tone" that film theorist Hilary Radner associates with chick lit. This tone is one of the genre's defining characteristics, and she argues that many feel it lacks substance compared with other genres. She says they follow "a set of narrative tropes" which can be seen as "repeated film to film". Radner also goes on to say the genre is "incredibly heteronormative and white-washed". These common characteristics of the genre can lead to criticism from minority groups and social justice activists. It is often visible through the films and their tendency to use typecasting for their roles; because of this, actors such as Reese Witherspoon, Cameron Diaz (part Cuban), Seth Rogen and Sam Claflin fall into the category of "white-washing" the film. More issues with the genre emerge from the opinion that chick flicks play to every woman's "patriarchal unconscious". Radner furthers that claim by saying that it "constitutes a very attractive – and hence often exploited – version of feminine identity".

Some argue against the criticism of chick flicks. Researcher Sarah-Mai Dang acknowledges that the films can be "criticized as threatening backlash to the achievements to feminism"; however she contends that they can be celebrated for their representation of female freedom. Dang further proclaims that it gives space for the female voice to be present or heard in contemporary work like chick flicks.

== Diversity of the genre ==
Chick flicks are often also lumped in with the genre of romantic comedies. This narrows what can or cannot be considered a chick flick, with many people believing that for a film to be considered a chick flick it must have romance and comedy. There are key differences in how a romantic comedy versus a chick flick is marketed. A romantic comedy is often produced/marketed with men in mind. However, a chick flick is "a motion picture intended to appeal especially to women."

More recently, some women have been wondering why it is that romance is the only thing that is marketed to women when there are many other themes, topics and issues with which women could relate. Due to there not being a "dude-flick" category, many observers are asking if there is a legitimate need to associate a movie genre solely with women, and then make them feel guilty for liking it. Others argue that chick flicks have been a continuation of the "chick cultural explosion," which reflected and promoted the new visibility of women in popular culture. Instead, chick flicks were grouped with the product of chick culture and the deliberate decision to address female audiences, meaning that women's significance in contemporary culture was increasing.

The typical narrative in a chick flick of falling in love has now been adapted, and instead there has been an upward trend of including a greater representation of women in chick flicks. Women who instead focus on their professional life, women who reject beauty standards and feminist themes have all been seen in more recent chick flicks. There have also been chick flicks that aim to raise questions about the many choices women must confront such as the possibility of having it all, and the different effects of beauty standards in films such as Bridget Jones's Diary (2001), The Princess Diaries (2001), and In Her Shoes (2005).

There has been little to no emphasis on including individuals from ethnic/racial minorities in chick-flicks. If an individual who is an ethnic/racial minority is cast as a lead role, their co-star will usually not be an ethnic minority. In the 2005 film Hitch where Will Smith was cast as the main male lead, and Eva Mendes was cast as the female lead was a deliberate decision. A black or white woman was not cast in the role, as Will Smith believed that a black couple would have put off audiences worldwide while an interracial couple with a black male lead and white female lead would have offended viewers in the U.S. Casting Eva Mendes was seen as a solution because a Latina female lead and a black male lead was not considered taboo in the U.S.

== Examples ==
The following films have been characterized as chick flicks by some commentators:

- Little Women (1933)
- Cinderella (1950)
- Breakfast at Tiffany's (1961)
- Love Story (1970)
- The Way We Were (1973)
- Grease (1978)
- An Officer and a Gentleman (1982)
- Valley Girl (1983)
- Terms of Endearment (1983)
- Sixteen Candles (1984)
- Dirty Dancing (1987)
- Beaches (1988)
- Steel Magnolias (1989)
- When Harry Met Sally... (1989)
- Pretty Woman (1990)
- Ghost (1990)
- The Bodyguard (1992)
- Sleepless in Seattle (1993)
- Mad Love (1995)
- Waiting to Exhale (1995)
- Clueless (1995)
- While You Were Sleeping (1995)
- A Walk in the Clouds (1995)
- The First Wives Club (1996)
- My Best Friend's Wedding (1997)
- Titanic (1997)
- How Stella Got Her Groove Back (1998)
- One True Thing (1998)
- Practical Magic (1998)
- You've Got Mail (1998)
- 10 Things I Hate About You (1999)
- The Story of Us (1999)
- Forces of Nature (1999)
- Notting Hill (1999)
- Never Been Kissed (1999)
- Where the Heart Is (2000)
- Bridget Jones's Diary (2001)
- Legally Blonde (2001)
- The Princess Diaries (2001)
- The Wedding Planner (2001)
- Heartbreakers (2001)
- Blue Crush (2002)
- Maid in Manhattan (2002)
- My Big Fat Greek Wedding (2002)
- How to Lose a Guy in 10 Days (2003)
- Just Married (2003)
- 13 Going on 30 (2004)
- Mean Girls (2004)
- Sleepover (2004)
- The Notebook (2004)
- A Cinderella Story (2004)
- The Sisterhood of the Traveling Pants (2005)
- Aquamarine (2006)
- The Devil Wears Prada (2006)
- The Lake House (2006)
- Hairspray (2007)
- Enchanted (2007)
- Definitely, Maybe (2008)
- 27 Dresses (2008)
- Sex and the City (2008)
- Twilight (2008)
- Bride Wars (2009)
- The Proposal (2009)
- Confessions of a Shopaholic (2009)
- He's Just Not That Into You (2009)
- Life as We Know It (2010)
- Valentine's Day (2010)
- Bridesmaids (2011)
- Something Borrowed (2011)
- No Strings Attached (2011)
- Friends with Benefits (2011)
- Fifty Shades of Grey (2015)
- Tall Girl (2019)
- Turning Red (2022)
- Barbie (2023)

== See also ==
- Chick lit
- Feminist film theory
- Female buddy film
- "Love means never having to say you're sorry"
- Women in film
- Women's cinema
- Woman's film
