= Woman's film =

Film genre

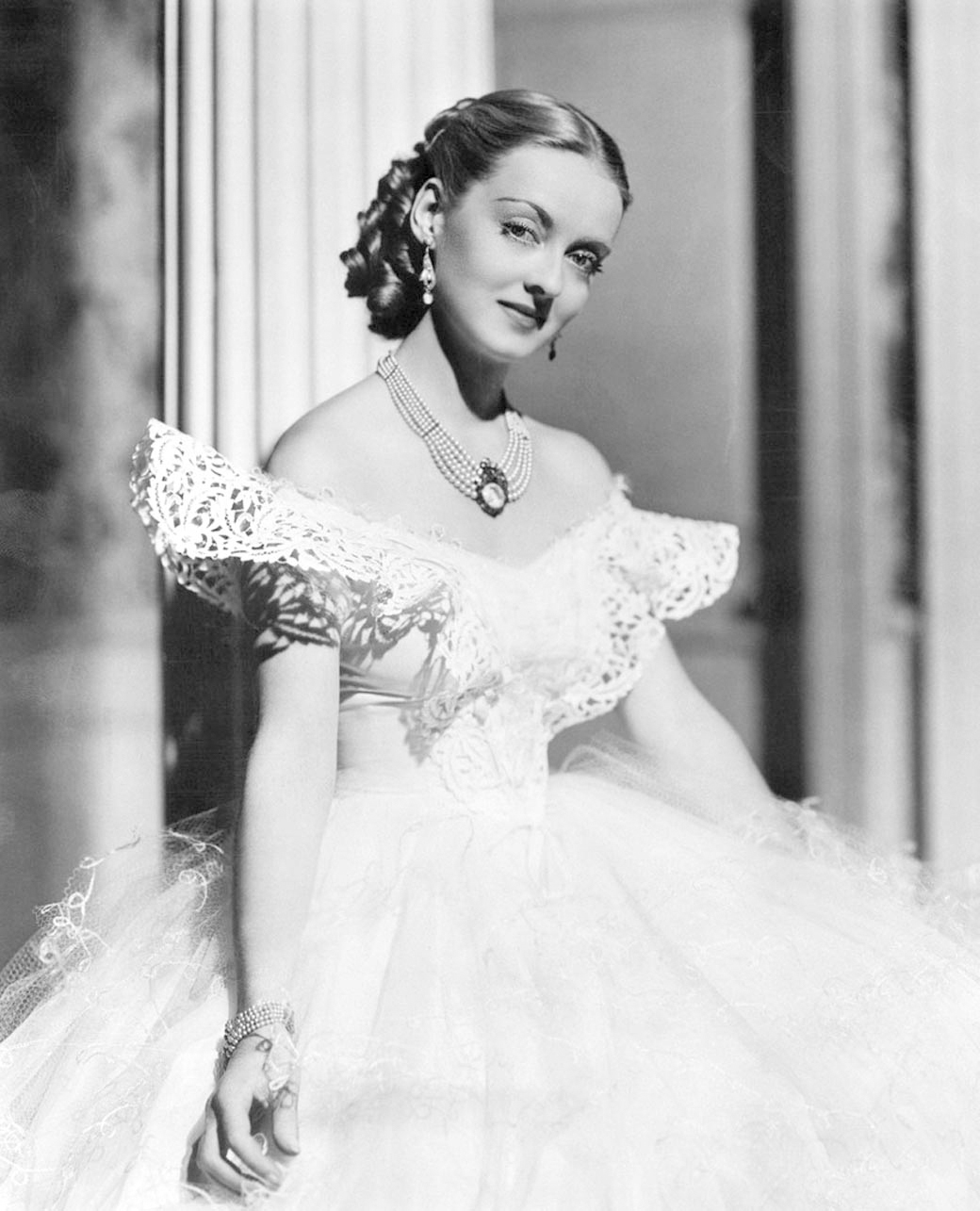
Bette Davis in Jezebel (1938), one of the quintessential woman's films. Davis plays a Southern belle who loses her fiancé (Fonda) and her social standing when she defies conventions. She redeems herself by self-sacrifice.

The woman's film is a film genre that includes women-centered narratives, female protagonists and is designed to appeal to a female audience. Woman's films usually portray stereotypical women's concerns such as domestic life, family, motherhood, self-sacrifice, and romance. These films were produced from the silent era through the 1950s and early 1960s, but were most popular in the 1930s and 1940s, reaching their zenith during World War II. Although Hollywood continued to make films characterized by some of the elements of the traditional woman's film in the second half of the 20th century, the term itself disappeared in the 1960s. The work of directors George Cukor, Douglas Sirk, Max Ophüls, and Josef von Sternberg has been associated with the woman's film genre. Joan Crawford, Bette Davis, and Barbara Stanwyck were some of the genre's most prolific stars.

The beginnings of the genre can be traced back to D. W. Griffith's silent films. Film historians and critics defined the genre and canon in retrospect. Before the woman's film became an established genre in the 1980s, many of the classic woman's films were referred to as melodramas.

Woman's films are films that were made for women by predominantly male screenwriters and directors whereas women's cinema encompasses films that have been made by women.

== Definition ==
When the woman's film was still at a nascent stage, it was not regarded as a fully independent genre. Mary Ann Doane, for example, argued that the woman's film is not a "pure genre" because it is crossed and informed by a number of other genres such as melodrama, film noir, the gothic, and horror film. Similarly, film scholar Scott Simmon argues that the woman's film has remained "elusive" to the point of having its very existence questioned. This elusiveness, he argues, is partially due to the fact that the woman's film is an oppositional genre that can be defined only in opposition to male-centered genres like the Western and gangster film. It has also been noted that it is a critically rather than industrially constructed genre, having been defined in retrospect rather than at the time of the films' production. The woman's film was seen as closely related to and even synonymous with melodrama. Other terms commonly used to describe the woman's film were "drama", "romance", "love story", "comedy drama", and "soap opera". Since the late 1980s, the woman's film has been an established film genre. Film scholar Justine Ashby, however, has observed a trend in British cinema that she calls "generic eclipse" whereby films that adhere to all the fundamental tenets of the woman's film are subsumed under other genres. Millions Like Us (1943) and Two Thousand Women (1944), for example, have been described and promoted as war films rather than woman's films.

The woman's film differs from other film genres in that it is primarily addressed to women. Cinema historian Jeanine Basinger argues that the first of three purposes of the woman's film is "to place a woman at the center of the story universe". In most other and particularly men-oriented film genres the opposite is the case as women and their concerns have been assigned minor roles. Molly Haskell explains that "if a woman hogs this universe unrelentingly, it is perhaps her compensation for all the male-dominated universes from which she has been excluded: the gangster film, the western, the war film, the policier, the rodeo film, the adventure film". The second purpose of the woman's film, according to Basinger, is "to reaffirm in the end the concept that a woman's true job is that of being a woman". A romantic ideal of love is presented as the only "career" that will guarantee happiness and that women should aspire to. The third purpose of the genre, as suggested by Basinger, is "to provide a temporary visual liberation of some sort, however small – an escape into a purely romantic love, into sexual awareness, into luxury, or into the rejection of the female role". Basinger argues that the major – if not only – action of the woman's film and its biggest source of drama and tragedy is the necessity to make a choice. The heroine will have to decide between two or more paths that are equally appealing but mutually exclusive as, for example, romantic love and a fulfilling job. One path will be right and consistent with the film's overall morality and the other path will be wrong but it will provide liberation. As the films' heroines were punished for following the wrong path and ultimately reconciled to their roles as women, wives, and mothers, Basinger argues that woman's films "cleverly contradict themselves" and "easily reaffirm the status quo for the woman's life while providing little releases, small victories or even big releases, big victories".

== Identifying characteristics ==
Unlike male-centered movies, which are frequently shot outdoors, most woman's films are set in the domestic sphere, which defines the lives and roles of the female protagonist. Whereas the events in woman's films – weddings, proms, births – are socially defined by nature and society, the action in male films – chasing criminals, participating in a fight – is story-driven.

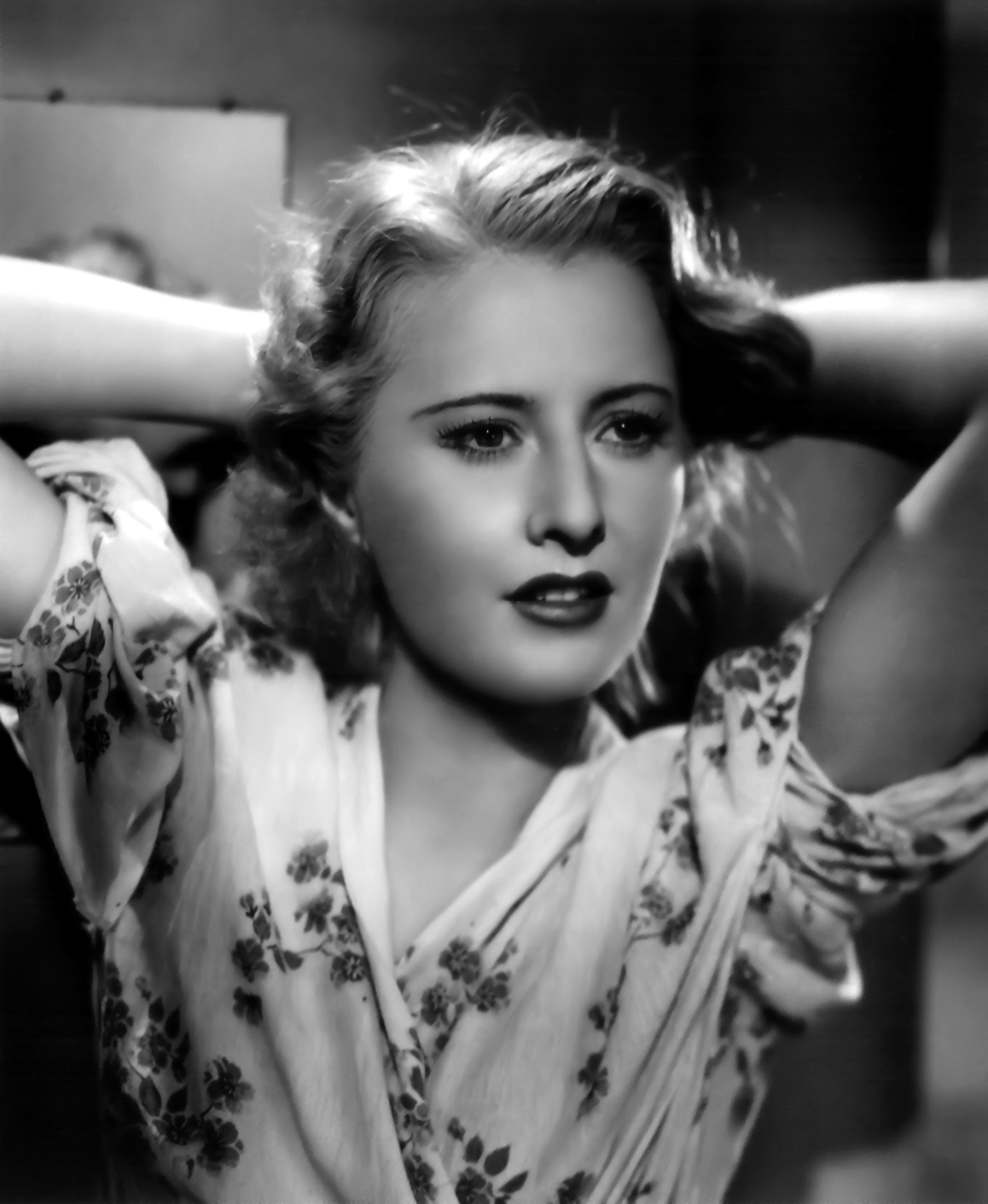
In King Vidor's Stella Dallas (1937), Barbara Stanwyck plays a working-class mother who sacrifices her connection to her daughter in order to help her become part of an upper-class world.

The themes in woman's and male-oriented films are often diametrically opposed: fear of separation from loved ones, emphasis on emotions, and human attachment in women's films, as opposed to fear of intimacy, repressed emotionality, and individuality in male-oriented movies. The plot conventions of woman's films revolve around several basic themes: love triangles, unwed motherhood, illicit affairs, the rise to power, and mother-daughter relationships. The narrative pattern depends on the activity engaged in by the heroine and commonly includes sacrifice, affliction, choice, and competition. The maternal melodrama, the career woman comedy, and the paranoid woman's film, a subgenre based on suspicion and distrust, are the most frequent subgenres. Female madness, depression, hysteria, and amnesia were frequent plot elements in Hollywood's woman's films of the 1940s. This trend took place when Hollywood tried to incorporate aspects of psychoanalysis. In the medical discourse in films like Now, Voyager (1942), Possessed (1947) and Johnny Belinda (1948), mental health is visually represented by beauty and mental illness by an unkept appearance; health was restored if the female protagonist improved her appearance. Friendship among women was fairly common, although the treatment was superficial and focused more on women's dedication to men and female-male relationships than on their friendships with each other.

The woman's films that were produced in the 1930s during the Great Depression have a strong thematic focus on class issues and questions of economic survival whereas the 1940s woman's film places its protagonists in a middle- or upper-middle-class world and is more concerned with the characters' emotional, sexual, and psychological experiences.

The female protagonist is portrayed as either good or bad. Haskell distinguishes three types of women that are particularly common to woman's films: the extraordinary, ordinary and the "ordinary woman who becomes extraordinary". The extraordinary women are characters like Scarlett O'Hara and Jezebel who are played by equally extraordinary actresses like Vivien Leigh and Bette Davis. They are independent and emancipated "aristocrats of their sex" who transcend the limitations of their sexual identities. The ordinary women, in contrast, are characters like Lara Antipova, who are bound by the rules of their respective societies because their range of options is too limited to break free of their limitations. The ordinary woman who becomes extraordinary is a character (like, for an example more recent than Haskell's classification, Katniss Everdeen) who "begins as a victim of discriminatory or economic circumstances and rises, through pain, obsession, or defiance, to become mistress of her fate." Depending on the type of heroine a film champions, a film can be either socially conservative or progressive. Certain archetypal characters appear in many woman's films: unreliable husbands, the other man, a female competitor, the reliable friend, usually an older woman, and the sexless male, frequently depicted as an older man who offers the protagonist security and luxury but makes no sexual demands on her.

A common motif in Hollywood's woman's films is that of the doppelgänger sisters (often played by the same actress), one good and one bad who vie for one man as Bette Davis in her double role in A Stolen Life (1946) and Olivia de Havilland in The Dark Mirror (1946). The good woman is portrayed as passive, sweet, emotional, and asexual whereas the bad woman is assertive, intelligent, and erotic. The conflict between them is resolved with the defeat of the bad woman. A central element of the 1980s British woman's film is the motif of escape. Woman's films allow their respective female protagonists to escape their everyday lives and their socially and sexually prescribed roles. The escape can take the form of a journey to another place such as the USSR in Letter to Brezhnev (1985) and Greece in Shirley Valentine (1989) or education as in Educating Rita (1983) and sexual initiation as in Wish You Were Here (1987).

In recent years elements of "Woman's films" appear in many four-quadrant blockbuster movies such as Pirates of the Caribbean: The Curse of the Black Pearl (2003) in which the character Elizabeth Swann decides her own fate throughout much of the film.

== History ==
The beginnings of the genre can be traced back to D. W. Griffith, whose one- and two-reelers A Flash of Light (1910) and Her Awakening (1911) feature the trademark narratives of repression and resistance that would later define a majority of women's films. Other predecessors of the genre include women-centered serial films such as The Exploits of Elaine (1914) and Ruth of the Rockies (1920).

The woman's film genre was particularly popular in 1930s and 1940s, reaching its zenith during World War II. The film industry of that time had an economic interest in producing such films as women were believed to comprise a majority of movie-goers. In line with this perception, many woman's films were prestigious productions that attracted some of the best stars and directors. Some film scholars suggest that the genre as a whole was well-regarded within the film industry, while others argue that the genre and term "woman's film" had derogatory connotations and was used by critics to dismiss certain films.

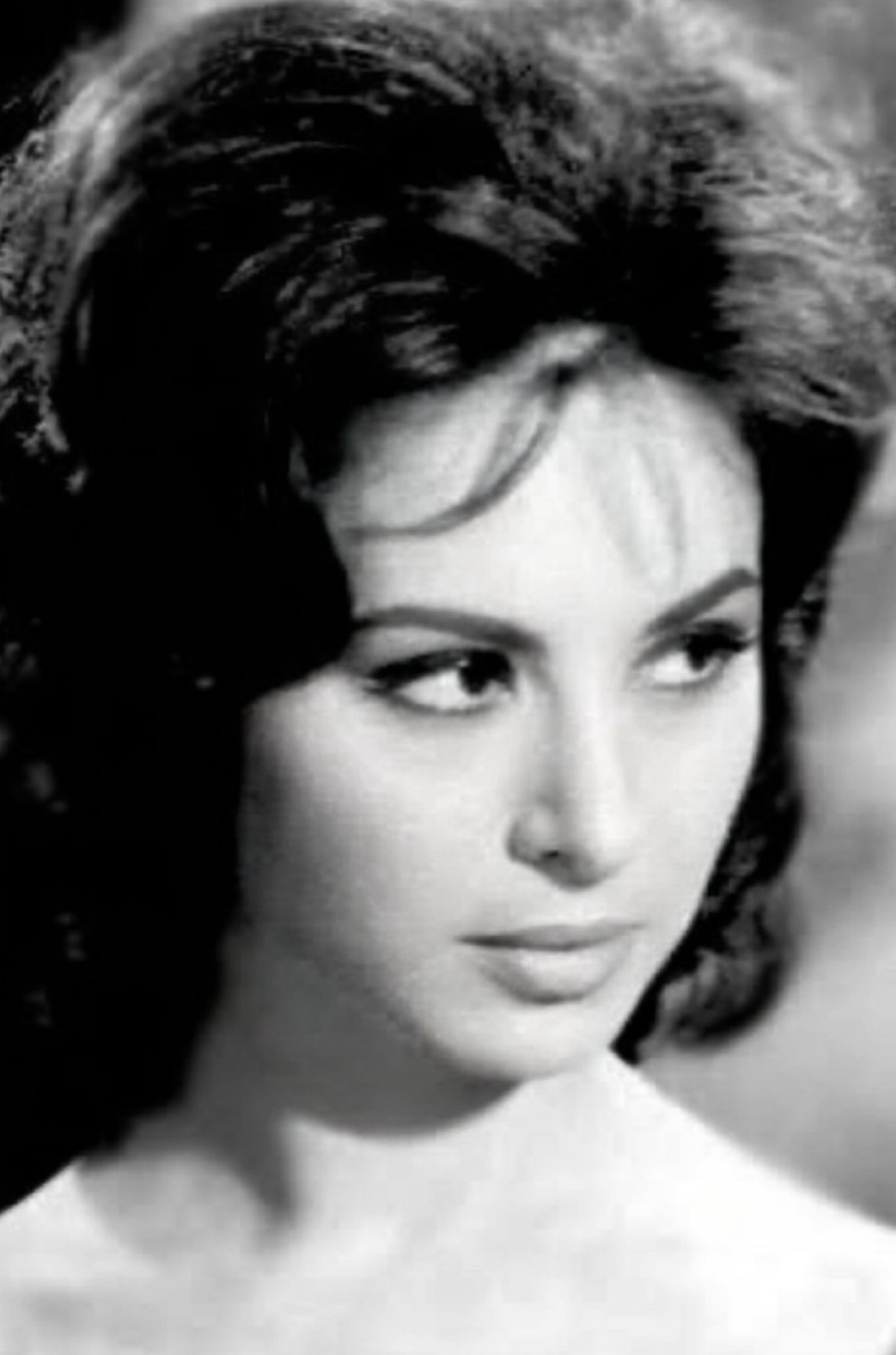
Faten Hamama (1931–2015), Egyptian film legend, inspired women all over the Middle East and Africa.

Production of women's films dropped off in the 1950s as melodrama became more male-centered and as soap operas began to appear on television. Although Hollywood continued to make films marked by some of the features and concerns of the traditional woman's film in the second half of the 20th century, the term itself disappeared in the 1960s.

The genre was revived in the early 1970s. Attempts to create modern versions of the classic woman's film, updated to take account of new social norms, include Martin Scorsese's Alice Doesn't Live Here Anymore (1974), An Unmarried Woman (1978) by Paul Mazursky, Garry Marshall's Beaches (1988), and Fried Green Tomatoes (1991) by Jon Avnet. Similarly, the 2002 films The Hours and Far from Heaven took their cues from the classic woman's film. Elements of the woman's film have reemerged in the modern horror film genre. Films such as Brian De Palma's Carrie (1976) and Ridley Scott's Alien (1979) subvert traditional representations of femininity and refuse to follow the traditional marriage plot. The female protagonists in these movies are driven by something other than romantic love.

Within British cinema, David Leland returned to the formula of the 1980s woman's film in The Land Girls (1998). The film tells the story of three young women during World War II and offers its heroines the opportunity to escape their old lives. Bend It Like Beckham (2002) emphasizes the key generic theme of female friendship and casts the heroine in a conflict between the restrictions of her traditional Sikh upbringing and her aspirations to become a football player. Lynne Ramsay's Morvern Callar is based on the woman's film tradition; a young woman escapes to Spain and pretends to be the author of her boyfriend's novel. While Morvern's journeys and transformations allow for liberation, she ends up where she started.

== Response ==
Jeanine Basinger notes that woman's films were often criticized for reinforcing conventional values, above all, the notion that women could only find happiness in love, marriage and motherhood. However, she argues that they were "subtly subversive". They implied that a woman could not combine a career and a happy family life, but they also offered women a glimpse of a world outside the home, where they did not sacrifice their independence for marriage, housekeeping, and childrearing. The pictures depicted women with successful careers as journalists, pilots, car company presidents, and restaurateurs. Similarly, Simmon notes that the genre offered a mixture of repression and liberation, in which repressive narratives are regularly challenged, partly via mise-en-scène and acting but also by conflicts within the narratives themselves. He further states that such resistances were present in some of the earliest woman's films and became the rule with Douglas Sirk's postwar American woman's films. Others have argued, however, that the narratives of these films offer only the repressive perspective and that viewers must read the texts "against the grain" to be able to find a liberating message. Critics such as Haskell have criticized the term "woman's film" itself. She writes:

What more damning comment on the relations between men and women in America than the very notion of something called the 'woman's film'? ... A film that focuses on male relationships is not pejoratively dubbed a 'man's film' ..., but a 'psychological drama.'"

Some woman's film have been met with critical acclaim. Woman's films that were selected for preservation in the United States National Film Registry as being "culturally, historically, or aesthetically significant" include It Happened One Night (1934), Imitation of Life (1934), Jezebel (1938), Gone with the Wind (1939), The Women (1939), Rebecca (1940), The Lady Eve (1941), Mrs Miniver (1942), Now, Voyager (1942), Gaslight (1944), Mildred Pierce (1945), Leave Her to Heaven (1945), Letter from an Unknown Woman (1948), Adam's Rib (1949), The Heiress (1949), All About Eve (1950), All That Heaven Allows (1955), Gigi (1958), My Fair Lady (1964), Funny Girl (1968), Wanda (1970), Grease (1978), Norma Rae (1979), Coal Miner's Daughter (1980), She's Gotta Have It (1986), Thelma and Louise (1991), The Joy Luck Club (1993), Selena (1997), and Titanic (1997).

== See also ==
- Chick flick
- Romance film
- Women's cinema
