= Pier Cloruro de' Lambicchi =

- Genre: Humor/comedy

Creative team
- Created by: Giovanni Manca

Pier Cloruro de' Lambicchi is an Italian comic strip series created by Giovanni Manca.

== Background ==
Pier Cloruro de' Lambicchi debuted in the children magazine Il Corriere dei Piccoli in 1930. The comics strip ended publications in the late 1940s, then briefly resurfaced in 1967 in the comics magazine Il Giorno dei Ragazzi.

The title character of the comics is a scientist who created in his ramshackle laboratory a special paint, called "arcivernice", which has the unique property of giving life to the characters depicted in the paintings and drawings.
