= Howard G. Minsky =

American film producer

Howard G Minsky (21 January 1914 – 10 August 2008) was an American film producer, studio executive and former talent manager, who started his career during the silent film era, selling film reel door-to-door. After working for both 20th Century Fox and Paramount Pictures, he worked for a talent agency. He was best known as the producer of the blockbuster film Love Story. When released in 1970, it was widely thought that Love Story saved Paramount Pictures during a financially strained time. He later produced Jory in 1973.

Minsky was married to his wife, Sylvia, for over 65 years until her death in 2002. He lived in Palm Beach, Florida until his death in 2008.
