= Mayo Kaan =

Bodybuilder

Mayo Kaan (2 March 1914 – 9 July 2002) was a bodybuilder who claimed to be the original model for Superman. Mayo was the father of millionaire Valerie Kaan.

== Superman origin claims ==
In November 1997, Mayo Kaan placed advertisements in several newspapers and magazines claiming that he was the first person to don the Superman costume and was the model for the Superman character. His claims were denied by the estates of Jerry Siegel and Joe Shuster, the creators of the Superman series. The publishers of the Superman comic, DC Comics, stated that Shuster and Siegel were the sole creators of Superman and that this was established years before Kaan's claims.

Superman collector Danny Fuchs believes it was possible Kaan had "history confused", and that he had modeled for the Fleischer Studios animations based on Superman. An observer spotted an apparent inconsistency with Kaan's photos – one shows him on the steps of Hatch Memorial Shell in the Boston Esplanade, but this structure was not built in 1940, four years after he allegedly modeled for Shuster.

Superman collector Mike Curtis believes Kaan played Superman in personal appearances and a short film for Macy’s Superman ride promotion for the Krypto Ray Gun. The previous year a similar promotion was for Buck Rogers where children could ride in a rocket ship and meet the characters. The ride is described in detail in the book The Adventures of Superman Collecting. as children rode in a rocket propelled by Superman, and had other adventures, ending up at the offices of the Daily Planet and receiving a copy of the newspaper with their names in the headline.
