= Crimson Key Society =

Students' society at Harvard University

The Crimson Key Society (CKS) is a student-run community service organization at Harvard University. Founded on April 14, 1948, CKS was originally formed to welcome visiting athletic teams to Harvard and represented Harvard's first organized commitment to hospitality. Crimson Key later went on to provide campus tours to prospective students and visitors, welcome incoming students during Freshman Week, and tour the United States to recruit applicants. Notable members of the society include Benazir Bhutto, Radcliffe Class of 1973.

The CKS holds events for first-year students, including an annual satirical screening of the Harvard-featured film Love Story, heckling the screen from beginning to end for its "sappy clichés."
