= AFI's 100 Years...100 Passions =

AFI 100 Years... series
- 1998: 100 Movies
- 1999: 100 Stars
- 2000: 100 Laughs
- 2001: 100 Thrills
- 2002: 100 Passions
- 2003: 100 Heroes & Villains
- 2004: 100 Songs
- 2005: 100 Movie Quotes
- 2005: 25 Scores
- 2006: 100 Cheers
- 2006: 25 Musicals
- 2007: 100 Movies (Updated)
- 2008: AFI's 10 Top 10

Part of the AFI 100 Years... series, AFI's 100 Years...100 Passions is a list of the top 100 greatest love stories in American cinema. The list was unveiled by the American Film Institute on June 11, 2002, in a CBS television special hosted by Candice Bergen.

Cary Grant and Katharine Hepburn are tied for the most films in the list, with six each. They co-starred in two of them – Bringing Up Baby and The Philadelphia Story. Audrey Hepburn has five movies on the list putting her in second place.

== The list ==
#	Film	Director	Year	Actress	Actor
1	Casablanca	Michael Curtiz	1942	Ingrid Bergman	Humphrey Bogart
2	Gone with the Wind	Victor Fleming	1939	Vivien Leigh	Clark Gable
3	West Side Story	Robert Wise; Jerome Robbins	1961	Natalie Wood	Richard Beymer
4	Roman Holiday	William Wyler	1953	Audrey Hepburn	Gregory Peck
5	An Affair to Remember	Leo McCarey	1957	Deborah Kerr	Cary Grant
6	The Way We Were	Sydney Pollack	1973	Barbra Streisand	Robert Redford
7	Doctor Zhivago	David Lean	1965	Julie Christie; Geraldine Chaplin	Omar Sharif
8	It's a Wonderful Life	Frank Capra	1946	Donna Reed	James Stewart
9	Love Story	Arthur Hiller	1970	Ali MacGraw	Ryan O'Neal
10	City Lights	Charlie Chaplin	1931	Virginia Cherrill	Charlie Chaplin
11	Annie Hall	Woody Allen	1977	Diane Keaton	Woody Allen
12	My Fair Lady	George Cukor	1964	Audrey Hepburn	Rex Harrison; Jeremy Brett
13	Out of Africa	Sydney Pollack	1985	Meryl Streep	Robert Redford
14	The African Queen	John Huston	1951	Katharine Hepburn	Humphrey Bogart
15	Wuthering Heights	William Wyler	1939	Merle Oberon	Laurence Olivier
16	Singin' in the Rain	Gene Kelly; Stanley Donen	1952	Debbie Reynolds	Gene Kelly
17	Moonstruck	Norman Jewison	1987	Cher	Nicolas Cage
18	Vertigo	Alfred Hitchcock	1958	Kim Novak	James Stewart
19	Ghost	Jerry Zucker	1990	Demi Moore	Patrick Swayze
20	From Here to Eternity	Fred Zinnemann	1953	Deborah Kerr; Donna Reed	Burt Lancaster; Montgomery Clift
21	Pretty Woman	Garry Marshall	1990	Julia Roberts	Richard Gere
22	On Golden Pond	Mark Rydell	1981	Katharine Hepburn	Henry Fonda
23	Now, Voyager	Irving Rapper	1942	Bette Davis	Paul Henreid
24	King Kong	Merian C. Cooper; Ernest B. Schoedsack	1933	Fay Wray	Kong; Bruce Cabot
25	When Harry Met Sally...	Rob Reiner	1989	Meg Ryan	Billy Crystal
26	The Lady Eve	Preston Sturges	1941	Barbara Stanwyck	Henry Fonda
27	The Sound of Music	Robert Wise	1965	Julie Andrews	Christopher Plummer
28	The Shop Around the Corner	Ernst Lubitsch	1940	Margaret Sullavan	James Stewart
29	An Officer and a Gentleman	Taylor Hackford	1982	Debra Winger	Richard Gere
30	Swing Time	George Stevens	1936	Ginger Rogers	Fred Astaire
31	The King and I	Walter Lang	1956	Deborah Kerr	Yul Brynner
32	Dark Victory	Edmund Goulding	1939	Bette Davis	George Brent
33	Camille	George Cukor	1936	Greta Garbo	Robert Taylor
34	Beauty and the Beast	Gary Trousdale; Kirk Wise	1991	Paige O'Hara	Robby Benson
35	Gigi	Vincente Minnelli	1958	Leslie Caron	Louis Jourdan
36	Random Harvest	Mervyn LeRoy	1942	Greer Garson	Ronald Colman
37	Titanic	James Cameron	1997	Kate Winslet	Leonardo DiCaprio
38	It Happened One Night	Frank Capra	1934	Claudette Colbert	Clark Gable
39	An American in Paris	Vincente Minnelli	1951	Leslie Caron	Gene Kelly
40	Ninotchka	Ernst Lubitsch	1939	Greta Garbo	Melvyn Douglas
41	Funny Girl	William Wyler	1968	Barbra Streisand	Omar Sharif
42	Anna Karenina	Clarence Brown	1935	Greta Garbo	Fredric March
43	A Star Is Born	George Cukor	1954	Judy Garland	James Mason
44	The Philadelphia Story	George Cukor	1940	Katharine Hepburn	Cary Grant; James Stewart
45	Sleepless in Seattle	Nora Ephron	1993	Meg Ryan	Tom Hanks
46	To Catch a Thief	Alfred Hitchcock	1955	Grace Kelly	Cary Grant
47	Splendor in the Grass	Elia Kazan	1961	Natalie Wood	Warren Beatty
48	Last Tango in Paris	Bernardo Bertolucci	1973	Maria Schneider	Marlon Brando
49	The Postman Always Rings Twice	Tay Garnett	1946	Lana Turner	John Garfield
50	Shakespeare in Love	John Madden	1998	Gwyneth Paltrow	Joseph Fiennes
51	Bringing Up Baby	Howard Hawks	1938	Katharine Hepburn	Cary Grant
52	The Graduate	Mike Nichols	1967	Katharine Ross	Dustin Hoffman
53	A Place in the Sun	George Stevens	1951	Elizabeth Taylor	Montgomery Clift
54	Sabrina	Billy Wilder	1954	Audrey Hepburn	Humphrey Bogart
55	Reds	Warren Beatty	1981	Diane Keaton	Warren Beatty
56	The English Patient	Anthony Minghella	1996	Juliette Binoche; Kristin Scott Thomas	Naveen Andrews; Ralph Fiennes
57	Two for the Road	Stanley Donen	1967	Audrey Hepburn	Albert Finney
58	Guess Who's Coming to Dinner	Stanley Kramer	1967	Katharine Hepburn; Katharine Houghton	Spencer Tracy; Sidney Poitier
59	Picnic	Joshua Logan	1955	Kim Novak	William Holden
60	To Have and Have Not	Howard Hawks	1944	Lauren Bacall	Humphrey Bogart
61	Breakfast at Tiffany's	Blake Edwards	1961	Audrey Hepburn	George Peppard
62	The Apartment	Billy Wilder	1960	Shirley MacLaine	Jack Lemmon
63	Sunrise	F. W. Murnau	1927	Janet Gaynor; Margaret Livingston	George O'Brien
64	Marty	Delbert Mann	1955	Betsy Blair	Ernest Borgnine
65	Bonnie and Clyde	Arthur Penn	1967	Faye Dunaway	Warren Beatty
66	Manhattan	Woody Allen	1979	Diane Keaton	Woody Allen
67	A Streetcar Named Desire	Elia Kazan	1951	Vivien Leigh	Marlon Brando
68	What's Up, Doc?	Peter Bogdanovich	1972	Barbra Streisand	Ryan O'Neal
69	Harold and Maude	Hal Ashby	1971	Ruth Gordon	Bud Cort
70	Sense and Sensibility	Ang Lee	1995	Emma Thompson; Kate Winslet	Hugh Grant; Alan Rickman
71	Way Down East	D. W. Griffith	1920	Lillian Gish	Richard Barthelmess
72	Roxanne	Fred Schepisi	1987	Daryl Hannah	Steve Martin
73	The Ghost and Mrs. Muir	Joseph L. Mankiewicz	1947	Gene Tierney	Rex Harrison
74	Woman of the Year	George Stevens	1942	Katharine Hepburn	Spencer Tracy
75	The American President	Rob Reiner	1995	Annette Bening	Michael Douglas
76	The Quiet Man	John Ford	1952	Maureen O'Hara	John Wayne
77	The Awful Truth	Leo McCarey	1937	Irene Dunne	Cary Grant
78	Coming Home	Hal Ashby	1978	Jane Fonda	Jon Voight
79	Jezebel	William Wyler	1938	Bette Davis	Henry Fonda
80	The Sheik	George Melford	1921	Agnes Ayres	Rudolph Valentino
81	The Goodbye Girl	Herbert Ross	1977	Marsha Mason	Richard Dreyfuss
82	Witness	Peter Weir	1985	Kelly McGillis	Harrison Ford
83	Morocco	Josef von Sternberg	1930	Marlene Dietrich	Gary Cooper
84	Double Indemnity	Billy Wilder	1944	Barbara Stanwyck	Fred MacMurray
85	Love Is a Many-Splendored Thing	Henry King	1955	Jennifer Jones	William Holden
86	Notorious	Alfred Hitchcock	1946	Ingrid Bergman	Cary Grant
87	The Unbearable Lightness of Being	Philip Kaufman	1988	Juliette Binoche	Daniel Day-Lewis
88	The Princess Bride	Rob Reiner	1987	Robin Wright	Cary Elwes
89	Who's Afraid of Virginia Woolf?	Mike Nichols	1966	Elizabeth Taylor; Sandy Dennis	Richard Burton; George Segal
90	The Bridges of Madison County	Clint Eastwood	1995	Meryl Streep	Clint Eastwood
91	Working Girl	Mike Nichols	1988	Melanie Griffith	Harrison Ford
92	Porgy and Bess	Otto Preminger	1959	Dorothy Dandridge	Sidney Poitier
93	Dirty Dancing	Emile Ardolino	1987	Jennifer Grey	Patrick Swayze
94	Body Heat	Lawrence Kasdan	1981	Kathleen Turner	William Hurt
95	Lady and the Tramp	Wilfred Jackson; Hamilton Luske; Clyde Geronimi	1955	Barbara Luddy	Larry Roberts
96	Barefoot in the Park	Gene Saks	1967	Jane Fonda	Robert Redford
97	Grease	Randal Kleiser	1978	Olivia Newton-John	John Travolta
98	The Hunchback of Notre Dame	William Dieterle	1939	Maureen O'Hara	Charles Laughton
99	Pillow Talk	Michael Gordon	1959	Doris Day	Rock Hudson
100	Jerry Maguire	Cameron Crowe	1996	Renée Zellweger	Tom Cruise

== Criteria ==
The list uses the following criteria:

- Feature-length fiction film: The film must be in narrative format, typically more than 60 minutes long.
- American film: The film must be in the English language with significant creative and/or financial production elements from the United States.
- Love story: Regardless of genre, a romantic bond between two or more characters, whose actions and/or intentions provide the heart of the film’s narrative.
- Legacy: Films whose "passion" have enriched America’s film and cultural heritage while continuing to inspire contemporary artists and audiences.
