= Sam Gross =

American cartoonist (1933–2023)

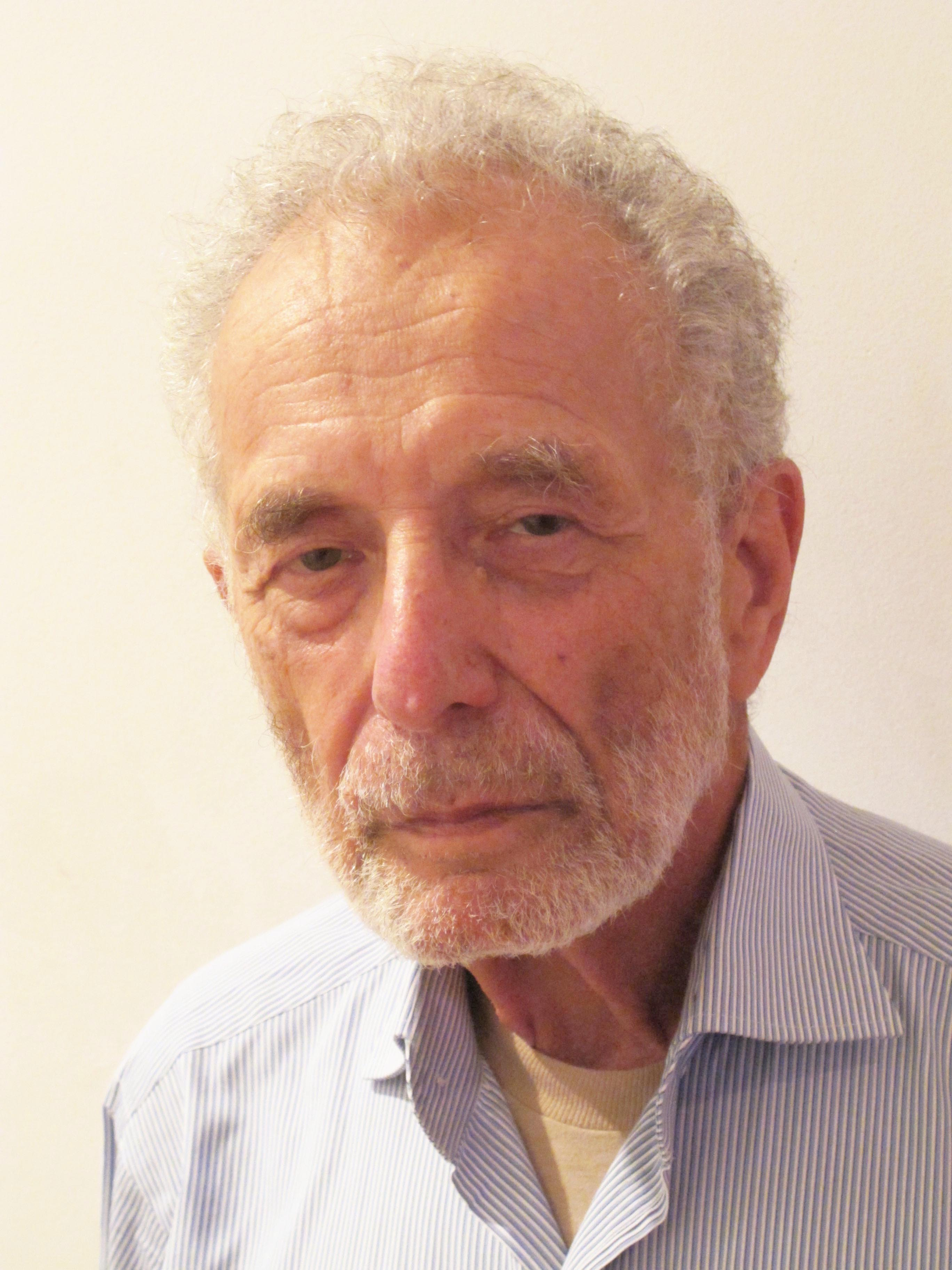
- Gross in 2014
- Born: August 7, 1933; New York City, New York, U.S.
- Died: May 6, 2023 (aged 89); New York City, New York, U.S.
- Known for: Cartoonist
- Notable work: Cartoon contributor for print publications
- Awards: Inkpot Award (1980)

Sam Gross (August 7, 1933 – May 6, 2023) was an American cartoonist, specializing in single-panel cartoons. He contributed to an array of publications, and was a regular contributor to The New Yorker.

== Biography ==
Born in The Bronx, New York City, Gross was the son of Max and Sophie, who were Jewish immigrants to America. His mother was born in Iași, Romania and his father was born in Lithuania. His parents came to the United States as children around 1905. Gross said his mother's side of the family is artistic. His father was a CPA.

Gross attended DeWitt Clinton High School, which at the time was an all-boys school. After he graduated, Gross went to the City College of New York. He started as a business major, then he wanted to be an accounting major, and finally an advertising major; Gross ended up taking a lot of art and history courses. His first published cartoon appeared in Saturday Review in 1953.

Gross was drafted into the American military in 1954, and served for two years in Germany. After his return to the United States, he married Isabelle Jaffe in 1959, and the couple moved to Darmstadt, in Germany, where he began to sell cartoons to European publications.

Returning to New York City after about a year, he began selling cartoons to "stag mags" such as Dude, Gent, and Rascal, and was earning his living full-time from cartooning by the early 1960s. His cartoons have appeared in numerous magazines, including Cosmopolitan, Esquire, Good Housekeeping, Harvard Business Review and The New Yorker.

Gross was cartoon editor for National Lampoon and Parents Magazine. Gross also became involved in electronic publishing ventures with cartoons playing an important role.

He created the comic strip Cigarman, which was published from 1997–1998.

Gross died on May 6, 2023, at the age of 89. He and his wife Isabelle had a daughter, Michelle Gross.

== Work habits ==
Every Wednesday Gross sat down to draw and, what he called, "trip". He claimed that he did not draw for magazines or newspapers, he just drew. Gross averaged 16–17 drawings a week, and numbered and dated every one. Once finished, he photocopied the drawings on forty-four-pound stock paper, then punched three holes and put them into loose-leaf books; Gross was afraid of losing his original copy and idea. In 2012, Gross had a total of about 27,592 cartoons.

== Collections ==
Published collections of cartoons by Sam Gross include:

- How Gross! : The Collected Craziness of S. Gross (1973)
- I Am Blind and My Dog Is Dead (1978)
- An Elephant Is Soft and Mushy (1982)
- More Gross (1982)
- Totally Gross (1984)
- Love Me, Love My Teddy Bear (1986)
- No More Mr. Nice Guy (1987)
- Your Mother Is a Remarkable Woman (1992)
- Catss by Gross (1995)
- We Have Ways of Making You Laugh: 120 Funny Swastika Cartoons (2008)
