= Cocco Bill =

Publication information
- First appearance: Il Giorno dei Ragazzi #1 (March 28, 1957)
- Created by: Benito Jacovitti

In-story information
- Partnerships: Trottalemme

Cocco Bill is an Italian comics character by Benito Jacovitti. He is the star of a parody Western comic set in hypothetical places in the Far West. He is a hot-tempered gunslinger who drinks chamomile tea. Occasionally mocked for this, Bill responds with violence. Despite these outbursts, Cocco Bill is a good guy, and always helps sheriffs to capture criminals. After Jacovitti's death in 1997 the series was continued by Luca Salvagno.

Cocco Bill's horse is called Trottalemme (which literally means "trot slowly"). The animal reasons like humans, smokes cigarettes, drinks tequila and also dreams at night.

== Style ==
As in most of Jacovitti's comics, the page is full of strange things: all around the place one can find salami (sometimes legged), worms with legs and hats, fish bones (typically close to the artist's signature), as well as horses with only two legs ridden by a man with four legs, and other absurdities. Many of the stories themselves are vignettes, pertaining to a surrealist American west (some issues happens in various other countries, like Canada). Most revolve around the titular character going to a new town and having to deal with whatever situation or mission is given to him by the local authorities.

== Adaptations ==
In 1968, Cocco Bill appeared as an animated segment on Carosello.

In 2000, Cocco Bill was adapted into an animated TV series, consisting of 104 episodes of in total 13 minutes in length per episode.

== See also ==
- Lucky Luke
