= Love Story (novel) =

1970 romance novel by Erich Segal

- First edition cover
- Author: Erich Segal
- Original title: Love Story
- Language: English
- Genre: Romance novel
- Publisher: Harper & Row (USA), Hodder & Stoughton (UK)
- Publication date: February 14, 1970
- Publication place: United States
- Media type: Hardcover, paperback
- Pages: 131
- ISBN: 0-340-12508-X
- Followed by: Oliver's Story (novel)

Love Story is a 1970 novel by American writer Erich Segal. Segal wrote a screenplay that was subsequently approved for production by Paramount Pictures; the studio, in turn, requested that Segal adapt the script into a novel as part of the film's marketing campaign. The novel was released on February 14, 1970 (Valentine's Day), along with segments of the story which appeared in The Ladies' Home Journal. Love Story became the top-selling work of fiction for the duration of 1970 in the United States and was translated into more than 33 languages. The novel stayed on The New York Times Best Seller list for 41 weeks, and peaked at number one. The film was released on December 16, 1970.

In 1977, a sequel Oliver's Story, was published, and made into a film in 1978.

== Plot ==
Oliver Barrett IV, a jock and heir apparent to his father's business empire, is at Harvard preparing to take over the family business, while Jennifer (Jenny), the daughter of a Rhode Island baker, is a music major at Radcliffe College. Although divided by class, Oliver and Jenny are immediately attracted to each other and begin dating.

Upon graduation from college, the two marry against the wishes of Oliver's father, who promptly severs all ties with his son. Without financial support from Oliver's family, the couple struggles to pay Oliver's tuition at Harvard Law School. Jenny begins working as a private school teacher. After graduating third in his class, Oliver accepts a position at a respectable New York law firm. The couple move to New York City and decide to have a child. The couple has trouble conceiving and consult a medical specialist, who informs Oliver that Jenny has terminal leukemia.

Oliver attempts to live a normal life without telling Jenny of her condition. Jenny suspects something is wrong, confronts the doctor, and discovers the truth. Oliver seeks financial relief from his father, but lies about why he needs it. From her hospital bed, Jenny speaks with her father about funeral arrangements, and then asks for Oliver. She tells him to avoid blaming himself, and asks him to hold her tightly before she dies. When Oliver's father realizes that Jenny is ill and that his son borrowed the money for her, he immediately sets out for New York to reconcile with the couple. By the time he reaches the hospital, Jenny has died. Mr. Barrett apologizes to his son, who replies with something Jenny had once told him: "Love means never having to say you're sorry..." and breaks down in his arms.

== Sources ==
Multiple claims about Love Story’s origins have gained traction over the years.

=== Oliver ===
The most famous claim emerged in the 1990s and concerned then-Vice President Al Gore. Gore was reported to have falsely claimed that the plot is based on his life at Harvard. In fact, Gore admitted that his suggestion that the story was based on him and his wife Tipper Gore was a "miscommunication." In 1997, Segal confirmed that the character of Oliver was in part based on Al Gore, but that, as the New York Times stated, "only the emotional family baggage of the romantic hero in his novel was inspired by a young Al Gore...it was Gore's Harvard roommate, Tommy Lee Jones, who inspired the half of the character that was a sensitive stud, a macho athlete with the heart of a poet." Segal had met both Jones and Gore at Harvard in 1968, when he was there on sabbatical. Segal also affirmed that Tipper Gore did not figure at all in the story's inspiration. Jones would go on to appear in a supporting role in the film adaptation of the novel.

=== The story ===
The oldest origin story – promulgated by Segal himself shortly after the release of the movie, and still frequently cited – was that a former student of his at Yale had lost his young wife to cancer and that this became the basis for Love Story.

However, in 1971, the Italian magazine Oggi ran an interview with Segal in which he recanted that earlier claim.

"I told a lie just once, when I said that it was a true experience of one of my pupils at Yale. I said that because Jennifer is still alive and I was afraid of her becoming caught up in the publicity circus when my book came out." Here Segal was referring to the woman who inspired the character Jenny as "Jennifer," rather than by her real name. In the Oggi interview Segal stated that in fact the origins of Love Story lay in his heartbreak over having lost the woman he loved to another man, a loss which Segal likened to a bereavement.

=== Jenny ===
New York magazine in 1971 stated that Jenny resembled the "myopic, athletic, brisk princess" Brenda Patimkin in Philip Roth's Goodbye, Columbus.

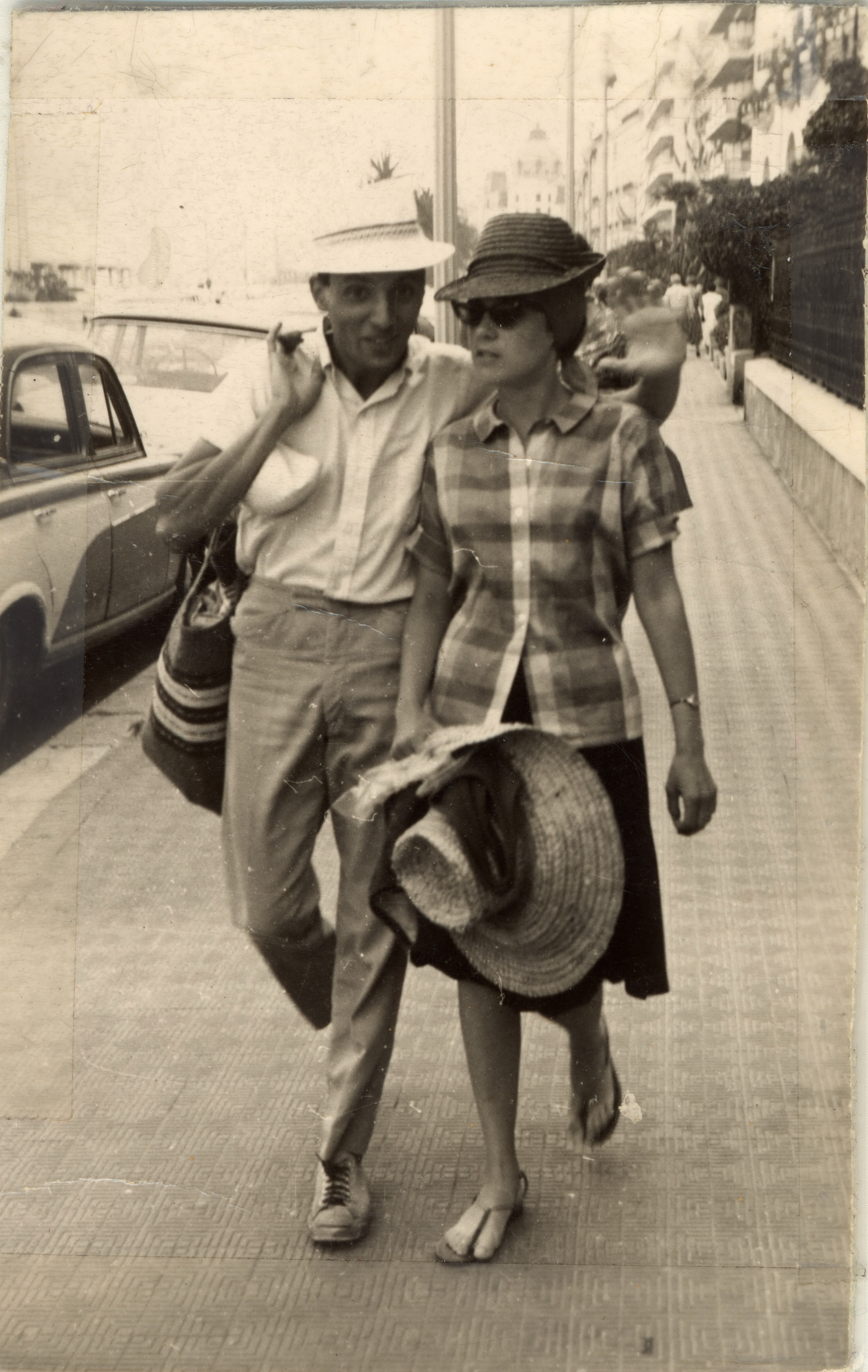
Erich Segal with Janet Sussman on the French Riviera, June 1960

However, In 1997, in the wake of the Al Gore story that included mention of Tipper Gore, Janet Sussman Gartner's daughter contacted Maureen Dowd of the New York Times to declare that Gartner had been the real inspiration for Jenny. Dowd's resulting article led to further press coverage. People ran a feature story, and Gartner later appeared on Oprah and Inside Edition.

As related in a 2016 Tablet article, Segal had become smitten with Janet Sussman when they were students at Midwood High School. Segal pursued her for many years, writing her hundreds of letters up to and through his years at Harvard. Segal even followed her to France to celebrate their June birthdays.

The Oggi article included a photograph of Segal on the French Riviera with a woman labeled as "Jennifer, the muse." People wrote that "in a 1971 article on the author, the Italian magazine Oggi identified Gartner in a photo (with Segal in France in 1960) as the woman who had inspired Jenny—without naming her." The Tablet article put the evidence together in the same way: "Though Erich never came out and declared in so many words, 'Janet Sussman is Jenny Cavilleri,' he admitted as much in an extensive interview for the May 1971 edition of the Italian magazine Oggi."

Sussman did not return Segal's romantic feelings, and in 1961 she married future tech pioneer (and fellow Midwood student) Gideon Gartner, who had been wooing Sussman over the same period as Segal. In the Oggi interview Segal said his devastation over Sussman’s marriage to Gartner led directly to Love Story. "The day I had read in the newspaper that Jennifer had gotten married, I realized something: if you lose the woman you love it is over for you, whether she leaves you for another guy or she dies. It was at this point that I started thinking about Love Story. That's why in the book, Jennifer dies: because for me she had died.”

Segal and Sussman (now Janet Sussman Gartner) did stay in touch, and when Segal finished writing Love Story he phoned Gartner and told her, “I’ve just written you my last love letter, and it's 150 pages long.”

=== Davey ===
David Johnston, who became Governor General of Canada from 2010 to 2017, was the basis for the character Davey, an ice hockey team captain. Johnston had been a Harvard Crimson varsity hockey captain and a friend and jogging partner of Segal's.

== Reception ==
The novel was an instant commercial success, despite scathing reviews. It was nominated for a National Book Award, but it was withdrawn when the judges threatened to resign. William Styron, the head judge for fiction that year, called it "a banal book which simply doesn't qualify as literature" and suggested that even by being nominated it would have "demeaned" all the other novels under consideration. The late Mel Zerman, a Harper executive who developed a warm friendship with Segal, remembered that some editors were wary of the novel. In an interview with American Legends website, Zerman recalled: "Editors didn't want to speak against it, but they didn't want to pretend it was literature, or, except for the money it was bringing in, was a book that Harper would be proud to publish. The late Stuart Harris, head of the publicity department, was very serious about literature. He didn't like the book. He didn't like the author. He turned Segal over to his very competent assistant, Lisl Cate. He said, 'Here, you do it.' He would have been happy to handle Aldous Huxley."

== Influences ==
A number of Indian films were based on the novel:

- Manjal kumkumam, a 1973 Tamil film
- Ankhiyon Ke Jharokhon Se, a 1978 Hindi film
- Madanolsavam, a 1978 Malayalam film
- Love, a 2008 Bengali film
- Sanam Teri Kasam, is a 2016 Hindi film based on this novel.

In addition, Mujhse Dosti Karoge!, a 2002 Hindi film, mentions the novel a few times.

== See also ==
- 1970 in literature
- Love Story (1970 film)
- Love Story (1973 TV series)
- Ankhiyon Ke Jharokhon Se (1978 film)
- Mera Naam hay Muhabbat (1979 Film Pakistan)
- Love (2008 film)
- Sanam Teri Kasam (2016 film)
