= Zorry Kid =

Italian comic book

- Zorry Kid

Publication information
- Publisher: Il Corriere dei Piccoli
- Genre: Humor/comedy
- Publication date: 1968

Creative team
- Created by: Benito Jacovitti

Zorry Kid is the title character of an Italian comic series created by Benito Jacovitti.

The comics debuted in 1968, published in the children magazine Il Corriere dei Piccoli; it was later published by the comic magazine Il Giornalino until 1990.

A series of animation shorts was realized in 1969 for Carosello.

The comic consists of a surreal and zany parody of Zorro.

Several anthological books and collections were published over the years.
