= Il Vittorioso =

Weekly comic magazine published in Italy (1937–1966)

Publication information
- Publisher: Azione Cattolica
- Schedule: Weekly
- Publication date: 1937 – 1966

Il Vittorioso (Italian for "The Victorious") was a weekly comic magazine published in Italy from 1937 to 1966.

== History and profile ==
The magazine was born on the initiative of the Azione Cattolica association as a catholic response to the secular comics, with the aim of offering to their young audience comics that had positive moral values and which were respectful of Catholic doctrine. It was first published in 1937. Enrico Basari's comic format of Beowulf was published in the magazine in 1941. It was the first comic format of the work.

Il Vittorioso had a good commercial success, with an average circulation of about 200,000 copies per week, even thanks to its distribution channel which included parishes and catholic educational entities.

The magazine included only works by Italian cartoonists, and it launched the career of several of them, notably Benito Jacovitti.

== See also ==
- List of magazines in Italy
