= Cigarman =

American comic strip

Cigarman is the name of both a comic strip and the hero of the strip. It was published on the back page of Smoke Magazine from 1997 to 1998. Cigarman was written by Sam Gross, and drawn by Randy Jones.

== Origin ==
Bitten by a radioactive hornworm (Manduca sexta), wealthy Durham Lonsdale becomes able to transform himself into a gigantic flying cigar, simply by saying Havana backwards (Anavah). Lonsdale lives in Megaburgh, as a "fabulously wealthy" socialite (a parody of Batman).

== Other characters ==
- Commissioner McGraft
- Fenster, McGraft's nephew
- Clipperlips
- Holly Honeybreath, Mayor of San Franallison
- Carlos the Old Cigarmaker
- Manuelo, Carlos' crossdressing nephew
- George Steinblunder, owner of the Megaburgh Puff Adders

== Stories ==
=== Part I ===
Appeared in Smoke, Spring 1997 issue

Origin story

=== Part II ===
Appeared in Smoke, Summer 1997 issue

Cigarman's arch-nemesis, Clipperlips, appears for the first time. He nearly defeats Cigarman, with the help of liquified blue mold, but Carlos 'the old cigarmaker' saves him.

=== Part III ===
Appeared in Smoke, Fall 1997 issue

Bank robbers flee to San Franallison, where Cigarman is unwelcome. He disguises himself as "Vibrator Girl" and lures them back into Megaburgh.

=== Part IV ===
Appeared in Smoke, Winter 1997 issue

Colonel Kootz and the Heart of Darkness Militia steal all of the Pentagon's cigars and declare independence. Cigarman regains the cigars with the help of the AFT (American Federation of Teachers).

=== Part V ===
Appeared in Smoke, Spring 1998 issue

Cigarman's arch-nemesis, Clipperlips, returns to threaten Megaburgh's ballpark, Puff Adder Stadium. Cigarman defeats him with a clever subterfuge and his secret Oriental training.
