= Love means never having to say you're sorry =

Phrase from the 1970 movie Love Story

- Actor: Ali MacGraw
- Written by: Erich Segal
- First used in: Love Story
- Voted No. 13 in AFI's 100 Movie Quotes poll

"Love means never having to say you're sorry" is a catchphrase based on a line from the Erich Segal novel Love Story and was popularized by its 1970 film adaptation starring Ali MacGraw and Ryan O'Neal. The line is spoken twice in the film: once in the middle of the film, by Jennifer Cavalleri (MacGraw's character), when Oliver Barrett (O'Neal) apologizes to her for his anger; and as the last line of the film, by Oliver, when his father says "I'm sorry" after learning of Jennifer's death. In the script, the line is phrased slightly differently: "Love means not ever having to say you're sorry."

The line proved memorable, and has been repeated in various contexts since. In 2005, it was voted No. 13 in the American Film Institute's list AFI's 100 Years... 100 Movie Quotes. The band Sounds of Sunshine had a Top 40 hit in the United States with a song titled "Love Means You Never Have to Say You're Sorry" in 1971. "Love means never having to say you're..." is the opening sentence in the popular song "Can't Help but Love You" by the Whispers, from their album named after the movie, issued in 1972.

The line has also been criticized and mocked for suggesting that apologies are unnecessary in a loving relationship. Another character played by O'Neal disparages it in the 1972 screwball comedy What's Up, Doc?: in that film's final scene, Barbra Streisand's character says "Love means never having to say you're sorry," and bats her eyelashes, and O'Neal's character responds in a flat deadpan voice, "That's the dumbest thing I ever heard."

MacGraw disagrees with the line, calling it a "crock".

== In popular culture ==
The line has also been parodied countless times, usually substituting another word or phrase for "love" and/or "you're sorry", especially the latter.

- Advertisements and trailers for the 1971 British horror comedy film The Abominable Dr. Phibes bear the tag line "Love means never having to say you're ugly."
- At the end of the movie What's Up, Doc?, Howard, also played by Ryan O'Neal, apologizes to his love interest, Judy, and she responds, "Love means never having to say you're sorry", to which Howard replies, "That's the dumbest thing I've ever heard."
- In a 2004 episode of The Simpsons ("Catch 'em if You Can"), the Simpson family watches the film, and Lisa retorts, "No, it doesn't!"
- In the 2004 film The Princess Diaries 2: Royal Engagement, the villainous Viscount Mabrey (John Rhys-Davies) tries to persuade his nephew Lord Nicholas Deveraux (Chris Pine) to usurp the throne of Genovia. Mabrey claims that Deveraux was named after Niccolò Machiavelli, before declaring "Power...means never having to say you're sorry."
- In the 2012 film Dark Shadows, vampire character Barnabas Collins (Johnny Depp) tells a group of hippies, "I am reminded of a line from Erich Segal's Love Story: 'Love means never having to say you are sorry.' However, please know that it is with sincere regret... that I must now kill all of you."
- In the season two finale of iZombie, titled "Salivation Army", Liv tells Clive, "A massive zombie outbreak means never having to say you're sorry."
