= Benito Jacovitti =

Italian comics artist (1923–1997)

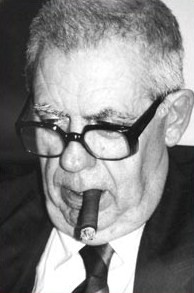
- Born: March 9, 1923 Termoli, Molise, Italy
- Died: December 3, 1997 (aged 74) Rome, Italy
- Area: Cartoonist
- Notable works: Cocco Bill
- Awards: U Giancu's Prize, 1996

Benito Jacovitti (Italian: [jakoˈvitti]; March 9, 1923 – December 3, 1997) was an Italian comics artist.

== Biography ==
Benito Jacovitti was born in Termoli, Molise. He was still a kid when he started drawing on the pavement of the village's streets. The son of a railwayman, Benito entered Macerata's art school at age 11, graduating from Firenze's art institute five years later. Here he received the nickname lisca di pesce ("fishbone") because of his thin figure, that he would use as his signature during his career.

In 1939 Jacovitti started working for the Florentine satirical magazine Il Brivido and, a year later, he began an almost 30 years long collaboration with Il Vittorioso, a Catholic comic magazine targeted at teenagers and young adults that only published Italian artists. There he created several characters: Pippo, Pertica e Palla, Oreste il guastafeste, Chicchiricchì, Cip l'arcipoliziotto and his nemesis Zagar, Giacinto corsaro dipinto, Jack Mandolino, La signora Carlomagno, adaptations of classic like Ali Baba and Don Quixote, and parodies of famous comics like L'onorevole Tarzan and Il mago Mandrago. During this period, he also contributed cartoons to the satirical weekly Il Travaso delle idee.

Starting from 1949, Jacovitti produced a series of cartoons for school diaries, named I Diari Vitt (short for Vittorioso) and published by A.V.E. These books made him a household name among kids and parents, and he kept producing them until 1980.

In 1956 he began working for the newspaper Il Giorno, then owned by Enrico Mattei; ; in 1957, he created Cocco Bill and the reporter Tom Ficcanaso for its weekly supplement Il Giorno dei ragazzi.

In 1968 Jacovitti left Il Giorno to join Il Corriere dei Piccoli, at the time the most popular weekly publication for kids, for which he renewed old characters as Cip l'Arcipoliziotto and Zagar, and created new ones as Zorry Kid, Tarallino Tarallà and others.

In 1973 he published the controversial Gionni Peppe on the left-wing oriented magazine Linus, followed in 1981 by Joe Balordo.

Jacovitti's characters sport characteristic huge noses and feet and his pages are detailed. While most of his production was geared toward humour and parody, Jacovitti did not shy away from more controversial material like the erotic book Kamasultra (based on the Kama Sutra) and political cartoons.

During his career, Jacovitti created more than 60 characters and produced around 150 books, making him one of the most prolific and original artists in comic book history. For the centenary of his birth, MAXXI (Rome) held the exhibition Jacovittissimevolmente: The Irresistible Art of Humour.
