= Love Story (1970 film) =

1970 film directed by Arthur Hiller

- Theatrical release poster
- Directed by: Arthur Hiller
- Screenplay by: Erich Segal
- Produced by: Howard G. Minsky
- Starring: Ali MacGraw; Ryan O'Neal; John Marley; Ray Milland
- Cinematography: Richard Kratina
- Edited by: Robert C. Jones
- Music by: Francis Lai
- Production companies: Paramount Pictures; Love Story Company
- Distributed by: Paramount Pictures
- Release date: December 16, 1970
- Running time: 101 minutes
- Country: United States
- Language: English
- Budget: $2.2 million
- Box office: $173.4 million

Love Story is a 1970 American romantic drama film directed by Arthur Hiller, written by Erich Segal (who concurrently adapted his screenplay into a 1970 novel). It stars Ali MacGraw and Ryan O'Neal, and features John Marley, Ray Milland, and Tommy Lee Jones in his film debut. The film is about a relationship between two students at Harvard College — the upper-class Oliver Barrett IV (O'Neal) and the working-class Jenny Cavilleri (MacGraw) — who are eventually affected by tragedy.

The film was released by Paramount Pictures on December 16, 1970. It was a major critical and commercial success, and was nominated for seven Academy Awards, including Best Picture, Best Director, Best Actor (for O'Neal), and Best Actress (for MacGraw). The film's theme song, "(Where Do I Begin?) Love Story", was nominated for two Grammy Awards.

Love Story proved a pop culture sensation of the 1970s, spawning several imitations, parodies, and homages, and is credited with having re-energized the cinematic melodrama in Hollywood. A sequel film, Oliver's Story, followed in 1978. The film is considered one of the most romantic by the American Film Institute (No. 9 on the list) and is one of the highest-grossing films of all time adjusted for inflation.

== Plot ==
Oliver Barrett IV, heir of an upper-class family, attends Harvard College, where he majors in social studies and plays ice hockey. He meets Jennifer "Jenny" Cavilleri, a quick-witted, working-class Radcliffe College student majoring in classical music. He invites her to a hockey game versus Dartmouth College and they fall in love despite their differences.

Later, Oliver's father drives a long distance to Ithaca, New York, to see his son's hockey game against Cornell University for the All-Ivy title. Barrett is suspended from the game for fighting and Harvard loses to Cornell, 4–3. Oliver turns down his father's offer of a steak dinner and help in getting into Harvard Law School.

Jenny reveals that she has a scholarship arranged for after her Radcliffe graduation to study in Paris with Nadia Boulanger. Oliver is upset that he does not figure in Jenny's plans and proposes marriage. She accepts his proposal and he takes her to the Barrett mansion to meet his parents, who are uncomfortable with her Italian-American and blue-collar background. Oliver's father says he will cut him off financially if he marries Jenny.

They visit her father, Phil, a widowed baker in Cranston, Rhode Island, who wants Oliver to get along with his father. Phil wants a Catholic wedding but Oliver and Jenny marry themselves with him reciting "Song of the Open Road" by Walt Whitman and her reciting "Sonnet 22" by Elizabeth Barrett Browning.

Jenny works as a teacher but without his father's financial support the couple struggle to pay Oliver's way through Harvard Law School. Oliver graduates third in his class and takes a position at a high-powered New York City law firm. They are ready to start a family but fail to conceive. After Jenny undergoes three blood tests, Oliver is told that she is terminally ill.

Oliver attempts to continue as normal without telling Jenny of her condition, but she confronts her doctor and finds out the truth. Oliver buys tickets to Paris, but she declines to go, wanting only to spend time with him. Oliver seeks money from his estranged father to pay for Jenny's medical care, but as a matter of pride does not disclose the reason for this request. Although his father assumes an extramarital affair, which Oliver makes no attempt to deny, he lends the money anyway.

From her hospital bed, Jenny makes arrangements with her father for a Catholic funeral. She tells Oliver to not blame himself, insisting that he never held her back from music and Paris and it was worth it for the love they shared. Jenny's last wish is for Oliver to embrace her tightly as she dies.

A grief-stricken Oliver leaves the hospital and sees his father outside, who has learned the true reason for Oliver's request. When his father gives his condolence, Oliver replies that "love means never having to say you're sorry", something that Jenny had said to him earlier. Oliver walks alone to the open air ice rink, where Jenny had watched him skate the day she was hospitalized.

== Cast ==
- Ali MacGraw as Jennifer "Jenny" Cavilleri
- Ryan O'Neal as Oliver Barrett IV
- John Marley as Phil Cavilleri
- Ray Milland as Oliver Barrett III
- Russell Nype as Dean Thompson
- Katharine Balfour as Mrs. Barrett
- Sydney Walker as Dr. Shapeley
- Robert Modica as Dr. Addison
- Walker Daniels as Ray Stratton
- Tommy Lee Jones as Hank Simpson (credited as Tom Lee Jones)
- John Merensky as Steve
- Andrew Duncan as Reverend Blauvelt
- Fr. Frank Toste as a priest (uncredited)

== Production ==
=== Development ===
Erich Segal was an academic who had branched into screenwriting with films such as Yellow Submarine and The Games. He wanted to do a "story out of a 1940s movie" updated to the present day, "based on what I have observed among my students, living as I do right on campus. It deals with today’s personal commitment of one to one and the quest for a permanent relationship which begins much younger than it used to. The old, mindless football game dating is gone. The question of sexual morality is irrelevant, but there is much less ‘swinging’ among young people now than in the old days.”

The movie was originally written as a screenplay (based in part on Erich Segal's own experience), but Segal was unable to sell it. Howard Minsky, who was head of the motion picture division on the east coast for the William Morris Agency, who represented Segal, believed in the project. According to Arthur Hiller, "He gave up his job and made an arrangement with Erich Segal because he had such faith in that project. He mothered it all the way through. If it hadn't been for him, it would never have been a film."

Minsky says he had Segal rewrite the script seven times. The changes included altering the female lead from being Jewish to Italian-American, deleting the character of the girl's mother, and minimizing swearing and nudity.

The script was read by Ali MacGraw, who wanted to make it. She had just made Goodbye Columbus for Paramount Pictures, then under Robert Evans. Paramount had signed MacGraw to a three-picture deal and agreed to make the film as a vehicle for MacGraw. In May 1969, Evans announced that he wanted a "sensitive young actor" like Beau Bridges or Jon Voight for the lead and Larry Peerce, who had made Goodbye Columbus, would direct. Evans later said Peerce took the job because he "desperately needed a gig" but the director was always unhappy working on the project and pulled out after a month. He was replaced by Anthony Harvey, who had made The Lion in Winter, but Harvey quit the project after collaborating with Segal. Eventually Arthur Hiller, who was making two films at Paramount (The Out-of-Towners and Plaza Suite) agreed to direct.

In September 1969 it was announced Hiller would direct and that Harper and Row would publish a novelized version of the script in February of the following year. According to Evans, Paramount had suggested Segal adapt the screenplay into a novel to help promote the film. Minsky says he was the one who suggested this. Peter Bart, then an executive at Paramount, claims he suggested it. Segal says that he wrote the novel at the same time as the screenplay with considerable input from Gene Young of Harpers who was editor. The book was published in time for Valentine's Day in 1970, and became a best seller.

=== Casting ===
According to press reports, the lead role of Oliver Barrett IV was refused by Jeff Bridges, Michael Douglas, Beau Bridges, Michael York and Jon Voight. Evans says that Michael Sarrazin, Peter Fonda and Keith Carradine also turned it down. MacGraw recalls auditioning opposite Christopher Walken, Ken Howard and David Birney.

Hiller says "we tested eight or nine different actors and Ryan was the best. He didn't bowl us over at first. Then I saw some footage of a film he was just completing at 20th Century Fox and I thought it would be wonderful. He just had that empathy and feeling that was so necessary." According to a contemporary account, O'Neal was tested on the recommendation of Erich Segal, who had worked with him on The Games; he was paid $25,000. Evans later claimed he insisted O'Neal be cast because he made the best test, over the objections of Hiller who wanted Walken.

In November 1969 Evans claimed "We looked at 1,000 actors and that's not an exaggeration. We tested 14 unknowns and none of them compared to O'Neal."

Bill Cleary, former Harvard and 1960 U.S. Olympic hockey star (and later Harvard's hockey coach/athletic director), was Ryan O'Neal's hockey stand-in during key hockey scenes where skating and hockey-playing ability were required. Hockey scenes were filmed in three days at Harvard's former Watson Rink, which was rebuilt and is now known as Bright-Landry Hockey Center. Other hockey players in the film were played mostly by actual Harvard and Boston University hockey players, including Joe Cavanagh and Mike Hyndman.

O'Neal's younger brother, Kevin O'Neal (1945–2023), had a bit part in the film.

=== Filming ===
Filming started November 18, 1969, on location in Cambridge and Boston, and New York. It was the first time a film had gotten permission to film at Harvard. Moreover, the Ice Skating Rink for the Harvard vs Cornell game was shot at Hamilton College.

Filming Love Story on location resulted in damage to trees on campus. This experience, followed by a similar experience with the film A Small Circle of Friends (1980), caused the university administration to deny most subsequent requests for filming on location.

The scenes where they lived as newlyweds in Cambridge were filmed in the Agassiz neighborhood. Oliver carries Jenny over the threshold at 119 Oxford Street.

Jimmy Webb wrote a score for the film that was not used. Burt Bacharach was approached to do the score but pulled out when Robert Evans requested a score similar to that of Frances Lai. Eventually, Lai was hired.

The main song in the film, "(Where Do I Begin?) Love Story" was a major success, particularly the vocal rendition recorded by Andy Williams.

Arthur Hiller recalled, "We thought we were making a nice little movie. Well, all of us thought that except the producer who kept saying, "Arthur, believe me, this will be big." And I said, "Yes Howard, you're the producer, you have to feel that way." But he was totally right."

Filming finished on February 3, 1970. According to the late Mel Zerman, a Harper executive who was a friend of Segal, the author had mixed feelings about the production. Zerman told American Legends website: "Although he didn't specifically mention Evans, Erich Segal had no use for any of those movie people. He expected to do better than he did in terms of money. On the other hand, he liked Ali MacGraw tremendously. It was as if she brought the character he wrote to life. He thought that any other actor could have done as well as Ryan O'Neal and that there were a few actors who could have done better."

== Release ==
The premiere for Love Story took place at Loew's State I theater in New York City on Wednesday, December 16, 1970.

=== Television broadcast ===
The film was first broadcast on ABC television on October 1, 1972, and became the most-watched film on television surpassing Ben-Hur (1959) with 27 million homes watching, with a score of 42.3 by Nielsen ratings and an audience share of 62%. The rating was equaled the following year by Airport (1970) and then surpassed in 1976 by Gone with the Wind (1939).

== Reception ==
=== Box office ===
Love Story was an instant box-office smash. It opened in two theaters in New York City, Loew's State I and Tower East, grossing $128,022 in its first week. It expanded into another 166 theaters on Christmas Day and grossed a record $2,463,916 for the weekend, becoming the number-one film in the United States. It also grossed a record $5,007,706 for the week and grossed $2,493,167 the following weekend. It remained number one at the US box office for the next four weeks, before finishing second behind The Owl and the Pussycat for one week and then returning to the top of the box office for another six weeks.

It went into general release in the United States on June 23, 1971, expanding into an additional 143 theaters in New York, Los Angeles, Chicago, Detroit and St. Louis, grossing $1,660,761 in five days and returned to number one at the US box office for another 3 weeks, for a total of 15 weeks at number one. It was the sixth highest-grossing film of all time in U.S. and Canada with a gross of $106,397,186.

It grossed an additional $67 million in international film markets for a worldwide total of $173.4 million ($1.3 billion in 2023 dollars).

Arthur Hiller later reflected, "We had been going through a period of individuality in the 1960s, what I call the ‘biker films, like Easy Rider (1969). If Love Story [had come] out a few years earlier, it would have been run over by the motorcycles. A few years after, it would be lost to special effects. Movies have their time of why they work and why they don’t."

Hiller also said, "The message of Love Story really is what two people can give to each other for love alone. You know, people made fun of the phrase "Love means never having to say you're sorry." But think about it. All it says is that if you love somebody, you understand they're not perfect and they don't have to apologize for every little thing they do that isn't perfect. Its an affirmation of the human spirit... We hit at a time when if you disagreed with somebody, you hated them. That was the feeling in 1969 and 1970. Well, people were tired of that and were looking to say, hey, love is okay. You can be mad at somebody and still love them."

Peter Bart, an executive at Paramount when the film was made, said "Love Story had become a sort of cinematic aphrodisiac. A kid would take his date to the film, they would cry together, commiserate about the tragedy, then they would go to bed, as though to celebrate their survival. Hence each night the lines seemed to grow longer as the boys kept pressing their luck."

=== Critical response ===
Overall, Love Story received positive reviews. Rotten Tomatoes retrospectively collected reviews from 31 critics and gave the film a score of 65%. The critical consensus reads: "Earnest and determined to make audiences swoon, Love Story is an unabashed tearjerker that will capture hearts when it isn't inducing eye rolls."

Roger Ebert gave the film four out of four stars and called it "infinitely better than the book," adding, "because Hiller makes the lovers into individuals, of course we're moved by the film's conclusion. Why not?" Charles Champlin of the Los Angeles Times was also positive, writing that although "the plotline has been honored many times... It's the telling that matters: the surfaces and the textures and the charm of the actors. And it is hard to see how these quantities could have been significantly improved upon in Love Story."

Newsweek felt the film was contrived and film critic Judith Crist called Love Story "Camille with bullshit". Vincent Canby of The New York Times wrote, "I can't remember any movie of such comparable high-style kitsch since Leo McCarey's Love Affair (1939) and his 1957 remake, An Affair to Remember. The only really depressing thing about Love Story is the thought of all the terrible imitations that will inevitably follow it." Gene Siskel gave the film two stars out of four and wrote that "whereas the novel has a built-in excuse for being spare (it is told strictly as the boy's reminiscence), the film does not. Seeing the characters in the movie ... makes us want to know something about them. We get precious little, and love by fiat doesn't work well in film." Gary Arnold of The Washington Post wrote, "I found this one of the most thoroughly resistible sentimental films I've ever seen. There is scarcely a character or situation or line in the story that rings true, that suggests real simplicity or generosity of feeling, a sentiment or emotion honestly experienced and expressed." Writer Harlan Ellison wrote in The Other Glass Teat, his book of collected criticism, that it was "shit". John Simon wrote that Love Story was so bad that it never once moved him.

Love Story was ranked number 9 on the AFI's 100 Years...100 Passions list, which recognizes the top 100 love stories in American cinema. The film also spawned a trove of imitations, parodies, and homages in countless films, having re-energized melodrama on the silver screen, as well as helping to set the template for the modern "chick flick".

==== "Movie illness" criticism ====
Jenny Cavilleri's disease being unspecified and her relatively good looks during the onset of her illness was met with criticism for its implausibility. Vincent Canby wrote in his original New York Times review that it was "as if Jenny was suffering from some vaguely unpleasant Elizabeth Arden treatment". Mad magazine ran a parody of the film ("Lover's Story") in its October 1971 issue, which depicted Ali MacGraw's character as stricken with "Old Movie Disease", an ailment that causes a dying patient to become "more beautiful by the minute". In 1997, Roger Ebert defined "Ali MacGraw's Disease" as a movie illness in which "the only symptom is that the patient grows more beautiful until finally dying".

=== Accolades ===
Award	Date of ceremony	Category	Recipients	Result	Ref.
Academy Awards	April 15, 1971	Best Picture	Howard G. Minsky	Nominated	
Academy Awards	April 15, 1971	Best Director	Arthur Hiller	Nominated	
Academy Awards	April 15, 1971	Best Actor	Ryan O'Neal	Nominated	
Academy Awards	April 15, 1971	Best Actress	Ali MacGraw	Nominated	
Academy Awards	April 15, 1971	Best Supporting Actor	John Marley	Nominated	
Academy Awards	April 15, 1971	Best Story and Screenplay – Based on Factual Material or Material Not Previously Published or Produced	Erich Segal	Nominated	
Academy Awards	April 15, 1971	Best Original Score	Francis Lai	Won	
David di Donatello Awards	June 29, 1971	Best Foreign Actor	Ryan O'Neal	Won	
David di Donatello Awards	June 29, 1971	Best Foreign Actress	Ali MacGraw	Won	
Directors Guild of America Awards	March 12, 1971	Outstanding Directorial Achievement in Motion Pictures	Arthur Hiller	Nominated	
Golden Globe Awards	February 5, 1971	Best Motion Picture – Drama		Won	
Golden Globe Awards	February 5, 1971	Best Actor in a Motion Picture – Drama	Ryan O'Neal	Nominated	
Golden Globe Awards	February 5, 1971	Best Actress in a Motion Picture – Drama	Ali MacGraw	Won	
Golden Globe Awards	February 5, 1971	Best Supporting Actor – Motion Picture	John Marley	Nominated	
Golden Globe Awards	February 5, 1971	Best Director – Motion Picture	Arthur Hiller	Won	
Golden Globe Awards	February 5, 1971	Best Screenplay – Motion Picture	Erich Segal	Won	
Golden Globe Awards	February 5, 1971	Best Original Score – Motion Picture	Francis Lai	Won	
Golden Screen Awards	1972	Golden Screen		Won	
Grammy Awards	March 14, 1972	Best Instrumental Composition	Theme from Love Story – Francis Lai	Nominated	
Grammy Awards	March 14, 1972	Best Original Score Written for a Motion Picture or a Television Special	Love Story – Francis Lai	Nominated	
Grammy Awards	March 14, 1972	Best Pop Instrumental Performance	Theme from Love Story – Henry Mancini	Nominated	
Laurel Awards	1971	Best Picture		Nominated	
Laurel Awards	1971	Top Male Dramatic Performance	Ryan O'Neal	Nominated	
Laurel Awards	1971	Top Female Dramatic Performance	Ali MacGraw	Nominated	
Laurel Awards	1971	Top Cinematographer	Richard C. Kratina	Nominated	
Laurel Awards	1971	Top Composer	Francis Lai	Nominated	
National Board of Review Awards	January 3, 1971	Top 10 Films		8th Place	
Writers Guild of America Awards	1971	Best Drama – Written Directly for the Screen	Erich Segal	Nominated	

==== American Film Institute ====
Year	Category	Nominee	Rank
2002	AFI's 100 Years...100 Passions	Ali MacGraw and Ryan O'Neal	9
2005	AFI's 100 Years...100 Movie Quotes	"Love means never having to say you're sorry"	13

== Soundtrack ==
Love Story: Music From The Original Soundtrack

Soundtrack album by Francis Lai
- Released: 1970
- Length: 30:15
- Label: Paramount
- Producer: Tom Mack

Professional ratings
Review scores
Source	Rating
AllMusic	3/5 stars

The soundtrack from the film was released separately as an album, and distributed by Quality Records.

All tracks are written by Francis Lai, except where noted.

No.	Title	Length
1.	"Theme from Love Story"	3:20
2.	"Snow Frolic"	2:58
3.	"Sonata in F Major (Allegro)" (Wolfgang Amadeus Mozart)	2:17
4.	"I Love You, Phil"	2:04
5.	"The Christmas Trees"	2:48
6.	"Search for Jenny" (Theme From Love Story)	3:04
7.	"Bozo Barrett" (Theme From Love Story)	2:43
8.	"Skating In Central Park" (John Lewis)	3:04
9.	"The Long Walk Home"	1:30
10.	"Concerto No. 3 in D Major (Allegro)" (Johann Sebastian Bach)	2:35
11.	"Theme from Love Story" (Finale)	3:52
Total length:		30:15

=== Charts ===
==== Weekly charts ====
Weekly chart performance for Love Story
Chart (1970–1971)	Peak position
Argentine Albums Chart	2
Australian Albums (Kent Music Report)	18
Dutch Albums (Album Top 100)	9
Finnish Albums (Suomen virallinen lista)	11
French Albums Chart	6
German Albums (Offizielle Top 100)	12
Italian Albums (Discografia internazionale)	1
Italian Albums (Musica e dischi)	1
Spanish Albums Chart	1
UK Albums (Official Charts)	10

==== Year-end charts ====
Year-end chart performance for Love Story
Chart (1971)	Position
Dutch Albums (Album Top 100)	67
German Albums (Offizielle Top 100)	32

==== Theme with lyrics ====
The theme song with lyrics, "(Where Do I Begin?) Love Story", was not in the movie, but was released shortly after.

== Subsequent media ==
=== Sequel ===
O'Neal and Milland reprised their roles for a sequel, Oliver's Story, released in 1978. It was based on Segal's 1977 novel. The film begins with Jenny's funeral, then picks up 18 months later. Oliver is a successful, but unhappy, lawyer in New York. Although still mourning Jenny, he manages to find love with heiress Marcie Bonwit (Candice Bergen). Suffering from comparisons to the original, Oliver's Story did poorly with both critics and audiences.

=== Television series ===
NBC broadcast Love Story, a short-lived romantic anthology television series of the same name, in 1973–1974. Although it shared its name with the novel and movie and used the same theme song – "(Where Do I Begin) Love Story" – as the film, it otherwise was unrelated to them, with no characters or storylines in common with either the novel or the film.

=== Remake ===
In February 2021, remodeled ViacomCBS streaming service Paramount+ announced a remake of Love Story as a TV series, to be part of their new lineup of content. The series is to be produced by young adult stalwarts Josh Schwartz and Stephanie Savage, made prominent due to young adult hits such as The O.C., Gossip Girl and Looking for Alaska. It is to be made for Schwartz and Savage's production house, Fake Empire, as a co-production between Paramount Television Studios and CBS Studios.

== In popular culture ==
In 1971, the 20th episode of the fourth season of The Carol Burnett Show featured a take-off of the film called "Lovely Story", with Carol Burnett in the MacGraw role and Harvey Korman in the O'Neal role. The next year, they presented a "sequel" set in an alternate reality in which the MacGraw character lived, and became an annoyance to the O'Neal character, feigning illness whenever he threatened to leave her.

The film's female protagonist has been credited with the spike in popularity of the baby name Jennifer in North America in 1970, making it the most popular feminine given name for the next 14 years.

The 2001 song "Dance with the Devil" by rapper Immortal Technique is built over a looping piano sample taken from the film's theme song.

At the 2002 Winter Olympics, Jamie Sale and David Pelletier skated their free skate to the film's theme, initially losing the gold medal in a now-infamous scandal.

In 2020, the film's theme music was played during the funeral procession of Qasem Soleimani.

In an interview at the 2022 Toronto International Film Festival, Taylor Swift cited Love Story as an inspiration for the set design of All Too Well: The Short Film.

== Harvard College screenings ==
The Crimson Key Society, a student association, has sponsored screenings of Love Story during orientation to each incoming class of Harvard College freshmen since the late 1970s. During the showings, society members and other audience members mock, boo, and jeer "maudlin, old-fashioned and just plain schlocky" moments to humorously build school spirit.

== See also ==
- List of American films of 1970
- List of films about ice hockey

== Works cited ==
- Evans, Robert (1994). The Kid Stays in the Picture. Hachette Books. ISBN 978-0786860593.
