= Personal life of Stanley Kubrick =

Stanley Kubrick (1928–1999) was an American film director, producer, screenwriter and photographer. His personal life was characterized by a long marriage, close family relationships, and a strong desire for privacy. After settling in the United Kingdom in the 1960s, he spent most of his life in England, where he lived and worked from his home estate. Known for his meticulous personality, Kubrick largely avoided publicity while maintaining a clear separation between his professional and private life until his death in 1999.

== Marriages and family ==
Kubrick married his high-school sweetheart Toba Metz in May 1948, when he was nineteen years of age. They lived together in Greenwich Village and divorced three years later in 1951.

He met his second wife, the Austrian-born dancer and theatrical designer Ruth Sobotka, in 1952. They lived together in New York's East Village from 1952 until their marriage in January 1955. They moved to Hollywood six months afterwards, where she played a brief part as a ballet dancer in Kubrick's second film, Killer's Kiss (1955). The following year she was art director for his third film, The Killing (1956). They divorced in 1957.

During the production of Paths of Glory (1957) in Munich, Kubrick met and romanced young German actress Christiane Harlan, who played a small though memorable role. Kubrick married Harlan in 1958, and in 1959 they settled into a home in Beverly Hills, California with Harlan's daughter, Katharina, age six. They also lived in New York, during which time Christiane studied art at the Art Students League of New York, later becoming an independent artist. Like Kubrick, she wanted "solace to think, study, and practice her craft," writes LoBrutto. They remained together 40 years, until his death in 1999. Besides his stepdaughter, they had two daughters together, Anya and Vivian. Christiane was niece of the Nazi-era film-maker Veit Harlan — notably of anti-semitic propaganda film Jud Süß — but though personally ashamed to come from a "family of murderers" (her words), Kubrick's Jewish family accepted her.

Shortly after his death, Christiane assembled a personal collection of never-before-seen photographs and commentary into a book, Stanley Kubrick: A Life in Pictures. Included among the photos was only one of Kubrick's family together, taken in 1960. In 2010, she gave a videotaped interview with UK's Guardian, where she discussed his personality, his love of editing films, and some reasons why he chose to not make Aryan Papers.

Actor Jack Nicholson, who starred in The Shining (1980), observed that "Stanley was very much a family man." Similarly, Nicole Kidman, who starred in Eyes Wide Shut (1999), adds that Christiane "was the love of his life. He would talk about her, he adored her, something that people didn't know. His daughters adored them... I would see that, and he would talk about them very proudly." The opinion was shared by Malcolm McDowell, who starred in A Clockwork Orange: "He was happily married. I remember his daughters, Vivian and Anya, running around the room. It was good to see such a close-knit family."

== Settling in the United Kingdom ==
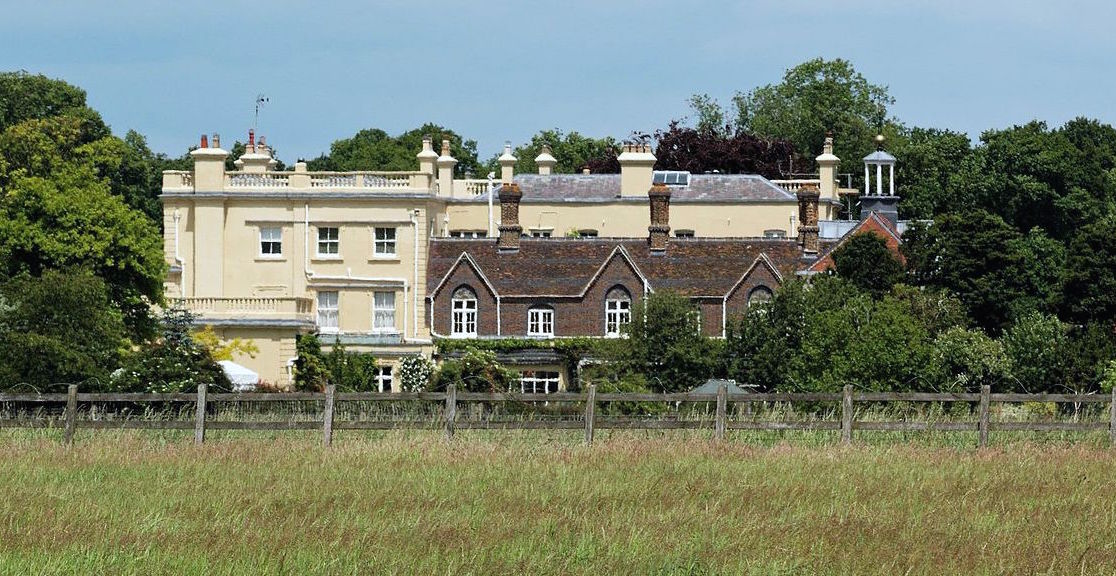
Kubrick's Childwickbury Manor in Hertfordshire, England

Kubrick moved to the United Kingdom to make Lolita because of easier financing via the Eady Levy, since at least 85% of the film was shot in the UK, and freedom from censorship and interference from Hollywood studios.

There he set up his life so that family and business were combined. Christiane Kubrick told the London Times how rough New York had become, with children having to be escorted to school by police, people being rude, and smashed glass all over the street. Although he thrived on the manic energy of New York, Kubrick soon adapted to the more genteel atmosphere of Britain.

When he hired Peter Sellers to star in his next film, Dr. Strangelove, Sellers was unable to leave the UK. Kubrick made Britain his permanent home thereafter, although "he never considered himself an expatriate American," wrote biographer Alexander Walker. He also shunned the Hollywood system and its publicity machine, resulting in little media coverage of him as a personality.

In 1965 the Kubricks moved to Abbots Mead, Barnet Lane, just south of the Elstree/Borehamwood studio complex. This was a turn of the 19th century house, sold to him by Simon Cowell's father, Eric. Kubrick worked almost exclusively from this home for 14 years where, with some exceptions, he researched, invented special effects techniques, adapted NASA f0.7 ultra-low light lenses for specially modified cameras, pre-produced, edited, post-produced, advertised, distributed and carefully managed all aspects of four of his films: 2001: A Space Odyssey (1965 to 1968), A Clockwork Orange (1969 to 1971), Barry Lyndon (1972 to 1975) and most of The Shining (1976 to 1980 - finished the year after he left for Childwickbury Green).

In 1978, Kubrick moved into Childwickbury Manor in Hertfordshire, UK, a mainly 18th century building about 48 km (30 mi) north of London and a 10-minute drive from his previous home at Abbotts Mead. After finishing The Shining he went on to make Full Metal Jacket and lastly Eyes Wide Shut. He is interred on its grounds together with his eldest daughter Anya Kubrick.

LoBrutto notes that living in the United Kingdom brought peace to the Kubrick family. After moving to Britain, recalls Christiane, one of the first British radio shows they heard was on gardening. The area's many landscaped parks, gardens and animals was an enormous contrast to New York. "It's very pleasant," said Kubrick, "very peaceful, very civilized here. London is in the best sense the way New York was" in the early 1900s.

His friend, screenwriter Michael Herr, points out that he did not live in Britain because he disliked America:

"God knows; America was all he ever talked about. It was always on his mind, and in his blood."

Kubrick's home in the English countryside, a half-hour drive from London, gave him "energy, inspiration, and confidence," states Walker. It provided him with a "favorable psychological climate in which to function," with more privacy and time for reflection. Kubrick's close friend, Julian Senior, who was vice president for Warner Brothers' London office, compared Kubrick's lifestyle to "a medieval craftsman whose home was his workshop." He did manage to stay up on current affairs, and read The New York Times daily, notes Jan Harlan, adding that Kubrick remained a "New Yorker" at heart his entire life.

== Home and workplace ==
His new home, originally a large country mansion once owned by a wealthy racehorse owner, became a workplace for Kubrick and Christiane. One of the large ballroom-size rooms became her painting studio. Kubrick converted the stables into extra production rooms besides ones within the home that he used for editing and storage. Christiane called their home "a perfect family factory."

A film trailer was kept in the driveway, and she took care of keeping visiting crew, staff, and actors, ensuring they were well fed and cared for. They both made special effort to keep their home warm and friendly, yet they shared a need for privacy. She adds, "When Stanley is relaxed he plays chess and likes to be very quiet ... Stanley is so gentle, such a shy and sensitive person." At home, children and animals would frequently come in and out of the room as he worked on a script or met with an actor. Kubrick's many dogs and cats, toward which he showed an extraordinary affection, were often brought onto film sets or editing rooms.

Diane Johnson, co-screenwriter of The Shining, notes that he enjoyed sharing his work with his family: "They all worked together, creating art and film on the kitchen table, so to speak ... Stanley was in no way an isolated individual, and never excluded his family from what he was doing."

Kubrick rarely left England during the remaining 40 years before he died. "He lived a simple (outer) life, and a largely devotional one," writes Herr, who describes his home and workplace:

His enormous house was as much a studio as a home, a double studio actually, one for him and his movies and one for his wife, Christiane, and her painting. It was a space of perpetual creative activity. He was thought by the press, and so by the public, to be sequestered there . .

Although Kubrick once held a pilot's license, some have claimed that he later developed a fear of flying and refused to take airplane trips. Matthew Modine, star of Full Metal Jacket, stated that the stories about his fear of flying were "fabricated," and that "he wasn't afraid to fly." He simply preferred spending most of his time in England, where his films were produced and where he lived.

Emilio D'Alessandro, a former race-car driver, was his personal assistant at his home workplace for over 30 years, handling much of the day-to-day chores such as driving actors to and from his home. In his 2012 book, Stanley Kubrick & Me, he describes his personal experiences, saying that Kubrick wasn't simply his "employer but his university," and that he was, "really like a father." Kubrick kept in close contact with business associates in the U.S. and elsewhere, mostly by telephone, calling associates at all hours for conversations that lasted from under a minute to many hours. Many of Kubrick's admirers and friends spoke of these telephone conversations with great affection and nostalgia after his death. Kubrick also frequently invited people to his house, ranging from actors to close friends, admired film directors, writers, and intellectuals. He rarely took vacations, even after completing a major film, and would simply begin preparing for his next one by catching up on seeing movies that had come out during the last year and searching through books and magazines for his next project idea.

Kubrick was an early user of desktop computers and had five that he worked with at home. LoBrutto describes Kubrick's home office:

Kubrick's personal office mirrored the pragmatic clutter of his New York apartment. An arsenal of tape recorders facilitate the mammoth shooting script process ... the office warehoused an enormous record collection of every recorded modern musical composition available. .

Screenwriter Michael Herr remembers working with him on Full Metal Jacket, in what he describes as Kubrick's home "War Room" which was a large space "crammed with desks and computers and filing cabinets" and "long trestle tables littered" with sketches and idea papers and photos of "streets, pagodas, prostitutes, shrines, and signs."

== Personal characteristics ==
His appearance was not well known in his later years, to the extent that a British man named Alan Conway successfully impersonated Kubrick locally for a number of years. Biographer Vincent LoBrutto notes that his privacy led to spurious stories about his reclusiveness, "producing a mythology more than a man," similar to those about Greta Garbo, Howard Hughes, and J. D. Salinger.

Michael Herr, Kubrick's co-screenwriter on Full Metal Jacket, who knew him well, considers his "reclusiveness" to be myth: "[H]e was in fact a complete failure as a recluse, unless you believe that a recluse is simply someone who seldom leaves his house. Stanley saw a lot of people ... he was one of the most gregarious men I ever knew, and it didn't change anything that most of this conviviality went on over the phone." He hated being photographed, notes Herr, although he let a few people, including his daughter, Vivian, take a few candids when working. Matthew Modine, who became close friends with Kubrick while working in Full Metal Jacket, describes how others saw him:

He becomes like the Great and Powerful Oz. This image of Stanley Kubrick is projected onto our consciousness, but he was just a menschy Jewish kid from the Bronx who was hiding behind a curtain.

Herr also describes his voice and conversational style, noting that he had an "especially fraternal temperament" and quite a few women found him "extremely charming." He adds that despite his living in England, his Bronx accent was still noticeable, but added that his voice was fluent and "melodious". "it was as close to the condition of music as speech can get and still be speech"

"Stanley always seemed supernaturally youthful to his friends," writes Herr. "His voice didn't age over the almost twenty years that I knew him [and] he had a disarming way of 'leavening' serious discourse with low adolescent humor ..." Ciment adds that he was "soft-spoken, with a crisp, surprisingly youthful voice, alternately serious and humorous in tone."

"There was great tenderness in him and he was passionate about his work. What was striking was his enormous intelligence, but he also had a great sense of humor. He was a very shy person and self-protective, but he was filled with the thing that drove him twenty-four hours of the day."

— Marisa Berenson, co-star in Barry Lyndon

Kubrick dressed simply, wearing the same style clothes every day: beat chinos, a basic blue work shirt, a ripstop cotton fatigue jacket with many pockets, and a pair of well-worn running shoes. "Many producers and actors thought he dressed like a beatnik", notes Herr, and his wife thought his baggy trousers made him look like a "balloon vendor." His meals were also simple, "he has no time to waste," writes Ciment.

His eyes were "dark, focused, and piercing:"

He looked out from a perceptibly deep place, and the look went far inside of you, if you were what he happened to be looking at ... I know that quite a few people, mostly actors, have unraveled when they got caught in Stanley's beams, even though there was rarely much anger in them. Stanley's look was just so deliberate, cool as functioning intelligence itself, demanding satisfaction, or resolution, of some kind of answer to some kind of problem ...

According to screenwriter Frederic Raphael, who worked with him on Eyes Wide Shut, "vanity was not his style; he never cited his own work with complacency and often admired other people's. He could be pitiless, but never conceited ... he solicited my views quite as if I were some venerable oracle." That view was shared by Herr: "Nobody who really thinks he's smarter than everyone else could ask as many questions as he always did, ... and trying to see every movie ever made." His inquisitiveness about photography and films started when he was a teenager. He later infiltrated film facilities around New York, hung around editing rooms, laboratories and equipment stores, constantly asking questions.

Herr also notes similarities between Kubrick's temperament and satirist and comedian Lenny Bruce, who was nearly the same age, with their love of jazz, ball games, and their common hipster persona. His temperament as a hipster also reflected Kubrick's likes and dislikes in everyday society. Among those, writes Herr, were his aversions to "waste, haste, ... [and] bullshit in all its proliferating manifestations, subtle and gross, from the flabby political face telling lies on TV to the most private, much more devastating lies we tell ourselves." According to Herr, Kubrick felt that "hypocrisy was not some petty human foible, it was the corrupted essence of our predicament ..."

After he moved to England, Kubrick especially enjoyed watching his favorite TV shows, including The Simpsons, The Tonight Show Starring Johnny Carson, Seinfeld, and Roseanne, thinking they were excellent comedies that portrayed American life. He had friends in the U.S. send him tapes of television shows, along with sports events and news broadcasts. Gay Hamilton, one of the stars in Barry Lyndon, recalls one night she couldn't get his attention while he and Ryan O'Neal were watching a boxing video he received from the U.S.

"He was fiercely unpretentious," notes Herr. "He was exclusive, he had to be, but he wasn't a snob. It wasn't America he couldn't take. It was L.A." According to Ciment, "social standing means nothing to him and he has no interest in acquiring it; money serves exclusively to guarantee him independence."

== Desire for privacy ==
Herr points out that most of what people knew about Kubrick came from the press, primarily the entertainment press. Few of the journalists that wrote about his life met him or knew much about it. He rarely gave interviews, "because he thought you had to be crazy to do interviews unless you had a picture coming out," adds Herr, who contrasted this with the many celebrities eager for the spotlight and thought this contributed to the public image of Kubrick as reclusive.

Among the notable aspects of his desire for privacy, in his home and film life, was that he never talked about his movies while they were being made. Nor did he like discussing them even afterwards, except to friends. He most of all avoided discussing their "meaning," notes Herr, because "he believed so completely in their meaning that to try and talk about it could only spoil it" for the listener. "He might tell you how he did it, but never why." When he was once asked how he thought up the ending for 2001, he replied, "I don't know. How does anybody ever think of anything?"

This aspect of his penchant for privacy may have also contributed to the negative reviews of many of his films or about him personally. Herr states that "it can never turn out well when a square takes a hipster for his subject." Similarly, Ciment argues that his refusal to become one of the 'family' may have also "wrecked his chances of ever being honored" in Hollywood as a director, similar to the way Charlie Chaplin, Orson Welles and Robert Altman were denied Oscars, all of them considered at the time to be "rebels" within the film world.

When he did grant interviews, he did so "with good grace and modesty," writes Ciment. A chauffeur would drive reporters to either a pub or to his home office, which was also his editing room. Interviewers would join him in his room "piled high with cans of film, newspapers, files and card-indexes, like some enormous artist's loft in Montparnasse or Greenwich Village – where this 'eternal student' can work away in privacy."

== Death ==
On March 7, 1999, four days after screening a final cut of Eyes Wide Shut for his family and the stars, Kubrick died in his sleep at the age of 70, after suffering a massive heart attack. His funeral was held on March 12 at his home estate with friends and family in attendance, totaling approximately 100 people. The media was kept a mile away outside the entrance gate.

Alexander Walker, who attended the funeral, describes it as a "family farewell, ... almost like an English picnic," with cellists, clarinetists and singers providing song and music from many of his favorite classical compositions. Although Kaddish, a prayer used during Jewish funerals, was recited, the funeral had no religious overtones, and few of his obituaries mentioned his Jewish background.

Among those who gave eulogies were Terry Semel, Jan Harlan, Steven Spielberg, Nicole Kidman and Tom Cruise. He was buried next to his favorite tree in Childwickbury Manor, Hertfordshire, England. In her book dedicated to Kubrick, his wife Christiane included one of his favorite quotes by Oscar Wilde:

The tragedy of old age is not that one is old, but that one is young.
