= Harlan – In the Shadow of Jew Süss =

- Theatrical poster
- Directed by: Felix Moeller
- Produced by: Felix Moeller; Amelie Latscha
- Cinematography: Ludolph Weyer
- Distributed by: Zeitgeist Films
- Release dates: October 29, 2008 (International Documentary Film Festival); April 23, 2009 (Germany)
- Running time: 99 minutes
- Country: Germany
- Languages: German; French; Italian

Harlan – In the Shadow of Jew Süss (German: Harlan – Im Schatten von Jud Süß) is a 2008 documentary film by German director Felix Moeller about one of the most notorious Nazi German filmmakers, Veit Harlan and his family.

== Synopsis ==
It focuses on the "wildly varying attitudes of Harlan's children and grandchildren", and how they struggle even today with the legacy of their ancestor's work.

The documentary also explores Harlan's motivations for making Jew Süss, a film that The New York Times has called "perhaps the most notorious anti-Semitic movie ever made". Harlan was the only artist from the Nazi era to be charged with war crimes.

== Production ==
The film uses "never-before-seen archival footage, unearthed film excerpts, rare home movies and new interviews".

It had its German television premiere on WDR on 23 September 2010.

It is distributed in the U.S. by Zeitgeist Films in 2010.

The film is the subject of the critical study Felix Moeller’s Harlan: Im Schatten von Jud Süss as Family Drama by David Bathrick.

Veit Harlan's relations who appear as interview subjects include his son the filmmaker Thomas Harlan, his daughters Maria Körber and Susanne Körber, both actresses; Suzanne's daughter the film journalist Jessica Jacoby; his nephew film producer Jan Harlan; his niece Christiane Kubrick, also an actress and the widow of Stanley Kubrick.

== Crew ==
- Written and directed by Felix Moeller
- Cinematography – Ludolph Meyer
- Sound – Martin Noweck
- Film editing – Anette Fleming
- Original music – Marco Hertenstein
- Narrator – August Zirner
- Producers – Amelie Larscha, Felix Moeller
