= AFI's 100 Years...100 Movies =

List of 100 milestones in American cinematic history

AFI 100 Years... series
- 1998: 100 Movies
- 1999: 100 Stars
- 2000: 100 Laughs
- 2001: 100 Thrills
- 2002: 100 Passions
- 2003: 100 Heroes & Villains
- 2004: 100 Songs
- 2005: 100 Movie Quotes
- 2005: 25 Scores
- 2006: 100 Cheers
- 2006: 25 Musicals
- 2007: 100 Movies (Updated)
- 2008: AFI's 10 Top 10

The first of the AFI 100 Years... series of cinematic milestones, AFI's 100 Years...100 American Movies is a list of the 100 best American movies, as determined by the American Film Institute from a poll of more than 1,500 artists and leaders in the film industry who chose from a list of 400 nominated movies. The 100-best list American films was unveiled in 1998. AFI released an updated list in 2007.

== Criteria ==
Films were judged according to the following criteria:

1. Feature length: Narrative format, at least 60 minutes long.
2. American film: English language, with significant creative and/or financial production elements from the United States. (Certain films, notably The Third Man, The Bridge on the River Kwai, 2001: A Space Odyssey and Lawrence of Arabia, were British-made but funded and distributed by American studios. The Lord of the Rings was New Zealand-made with American funding.)
3. Critical recognition: Formal commendation in print.
4. Major award winner: Recognition from competitive events including awards from organizations in the film community and major film festivals.
5. Popularity over time: Including figures for box office adjusted for inflation, television broadcasts and syndication, and home video sales and rentals.
6. Historical significance: A film's mark on the history of the moving image through technical innovation, visionary narrative devices or other groundbreaking achievements.
7. Cultural impact: A film's mark on American society in matters of style and substance.

== List ==
Film	Release year	Director	Production companies	1998 Rank	2007 Rank
Citizen Kane	1941	Orson Welles	RKO Radio Pictures	1	1
Casablanca	1942	Michael Curtiz	Warner Bros. Pictures	2	3
The Godfather	1972	Francis Ford Coppola	Paramount Pictures, Alfran Productions	3	2
Gone with the Wind	1939	Victor Fleming	Selznick International Pictures	4	6
Lawrence of Arabia	1962	David Lean	Horizon Pictures	5	7
The Wizard of Oz	1939	Victor Fleming	Metro-Goldwyn-Mayer	6	10
The Graduate	1967	Mike Nichols	Lawrence Turman	7	17
On the Waterfront	1954	Elia Kazan	Horizon-American Pictures	8	19
Schindler's List	1993	Steven Spielberg	Amblin Entertainment	9	8
Singin' in the Rain	1952	Gene Kelly, Stanley Donen	Metro-Goldwyn-Mayer	10	5
It's a Wonderful Life	1946	Frank Capra	Liberty Pictures	11	20
Sunset Boulevard	1950	Billy Wilder	Paramount Pictures	12	16
The Bridge on the River Kwai	1957	David Lean	Horizon-American Pictures	13	36
Some Like It Hot	1959	Billy Wilder	Ashton Productions, The Mirisch Company	14	22
Star Wars	1977	George Lucas	Lucasfilm	15	13
All About Eve	1950	Joseph L. Mankiewicz	20th Century-Fox	16	28
The African Queen	1951	John Huston	Horizon Enterprises, Romulus Films	17	65
Psycho	1960	Alfred Hitchcock	Shamley Productions	18	14
Chinatown	1974	Roman Polanski	Long Road Productions	19	21
One Flew Over the Cuckoo's Nest	1975	Miloš Forman	Fantasy Films	20	33
The Grapes of Wrath	1940	John Ford	20th Century-Fox	21	23
2001: A Space Odyssey	1968	Stanley Kubrick	Metro-Goldwyn-Mayer	22	15
The Maltese Falcon	1941	John Huston	Warner Bros. Pictures	23	31
Raging Bull	1980	Martin Scorsese	Chartoff-Winkler Productions	24	4
E.T. the Extra-Terrestrial	1982	Steven Spielberg	Universal Pictures, Amblin Entertainment	25	24
Dr. Strangelove	1964	Stanley Kubrick	Hawk Films, Polaris Productions	26	39
Bonnie and Clyde	1967	Arthur Penn	Tatira-Hiller Productions	27	42
Apocalypse Now	1979	Francis Ford Coppola	Omni Zoetrope	28	30
Mr. Smith Goes to Washington	1939	Frank Capra	Columbia Pictures	29	26
The Treasure of the Sierra Madre	1948	John Huston	Warner Bros. Pictures	30	38
Annie Hall	1977	Woody Allen	United Artists	31	35
The Godfather Part II	1974	Francis Ford Coppola	The Coppola Company	32	32
High Noon	1952	Fred Zinnemann	Stanley Kramer Productions	33	27
To Kill a Mockingbird	1962	Robert Mulligan	Pakula-Mulligan Productions, Brentwood Productions	34	25
It Happened One Night	1934	Frank Capra	Columbia Pictures	35	46
Midnight Cowboy	1969	John Schlesinger	Jerome Hellman Productions	36	43
The Best Years of Our Lives	1946	William Wyler	Samuel Goldwyn Productions	37	37
Double Indemnity	1944	Billy Wilder	Paramount Pictures	38	29
Doctor Zhivago	1965	David Lean	Carlo Ponti Productions	39	-
North by Northwest	1959	Alfred Hitchcock	Metro-Goldwyn-Mayer	40	55
West Side Story	1961	Robert Wise, Jerome Robbins	Beta Productions, The Mirisch Company, Seven Arts Productions, B & P Enterprises	41	51
Rear Window	1954	Alfred Hitchcock	Paramount Pictures, Patron	42	48
King Kong	1933	Merian C. Cooper	RKO Radio Pictures	43	41
The Birth of a Nation	1915	D.W. Griffith	David W. Griffith Corp.	44	-
A Streetcar Named Desire	1951	Elia Kazan	Warner Bros. Pictures, Charles K. Feldman Productions	45	47
A Clockwork Orange	1971	Stanley Kubrick	Polaris Productions, Hawk Films	46	70
Taxi Driver	1976	Martin Scorsese	B & P Enterprises, Italo-Judeo	47	52
Jaws	1975	Steven Spielberg	Universal Pictures, Zanuck/Brown Company	48	56
Snow White and the Seven Dwarfs	1937	David Hand, et al.	Walt Disney Productions	49	34
Butch Cassidy and the Sundance Kid	1969	George Roy Hill	Campanile Productions	50	73
The Philadelphia Story	1940	George Cukor	Metro-Goldwyn-Mayer	51	44
From Here to Eternity	1953	Fred Zinnemann	Columbia Pictures	52	-
Amadeus	1984	Miloš Forman	The Saul Zaentz Company	53	-
All Quiet on the Western Front	1930	Lewis Milestone	Universal Pictures	54	-
The Sound of Music	1965	Robert Wise	Argyle Enterprises, 20th Century-Fox	55	40
M*A*S*H	1970	Robert Altman	Aspen Productions	56	54
The Third Man	1949	Carol Reed	London Film Productions	57	-
Fantasia	1940	Various	Walt Disney Productions	58	-
Rebel Without a Cause	1955	Nicholas Ray	Warner Bros. Pictures	59	-
Raiders of the Lost Ark	1981	Steven Spielberg	Lucasfilm	60	66
Vertigo	1958	Alfred Hitchcock	Alfred J. Hitchcock Productions, Paramount Pictures	61	9
Tootsie	1982	Sydney Pollack	Mirage Enterprises, Punch Productions, Columbia Pictures, Delphi Productions	62	69
Stagecoach	1939	John Ford	Walter Wanger Productions	63	-
Close Encounters of the Third Kind	1977	Steven Spielberg	Columbia Pictures, EMI	64	-
The Silence of the Lambs	1991	Jonathan Demme	Strong Heart Productions, Orion Pictures	65	74
Network	1976	Sidney Lumet	Metro-Goldwyn-Mayer, United Artists	66	64
The Manchurian Candidate	1962	John Frankenheimer	M. C. Productions	67	-
An American in Paris	1951	Vincente Minnelli	Metro-Goldwyn-Mayer	68	-
Shane	1953	George Stevens	Paramount Pictures	69	45
The French Connection	1971	William Friedkin	D'Antoni Productions	70	93
Forrest Gump	1994	Robert Zemeckis	The Tisch Company	71	76
Ben-Hur	1959	William Wyler	Metro-Goldwyn-Mayer	72	100
Wuthering Heights	1939	William Wyler	Samuel Goldwyn Productions	73	-
The Gold Rush	1925	Charlie Chaplin	Charles Chaplin Productions	74	58
Dances with Wolves	1990	Kevin Costner	TIG Productions, Majestic Films International	75	-
City Lights	1931	Charlie Chaplin	Charles Chaplin Productions	76	11
American Graffiti	1973	George Lucas	Coppola Co., Lucasfilm	77	62
Rocky	1976	John G. Avildsen	Chartoff-Winkler Productions	78	57
The Deer Hunter	1978	Michael Cimino	EMI	79	53
The Wild Bunch	1969	Sam Peckinpah	Phil Feldman Productions, Warner Bros.-Seven Arts	80	79
Modern Times	1936	Charlie Chaplin	Charles Chaplin Film Corp.	81	78
Giant	1956	George Stevens	Warner Bros. Pictures	82	-
Platoon	1986	Oliver Stone	Hemdale Film Corporation	83	86
Fargo	1996	Joel Coen	Working Title Films, PolyGram Filmed Entertainment	84	-
Duck Soup	1933	Leo McCarey	Paramount Productions	85	60
Mutiny on the Bounty	1935	Frank Lloyd	Metro-Goldwyn-Mayer	86	-
Frankenstein	1931	James Whale	Universal Pictures	87	-
Easy Rider	1969	Dennis Hopper	The Pando Company, Raybert Productions	88	84
Patton	1970	Franklin J. Schaffner	20th Century-Fox	89	-
The Jazz Singer	1927	Alan Crosland	Warner Bros. Pictures, The Vitaphone Corp.	90	-
My Fair Lady	1964	George Cukor	Warner Bros. Pictures	91	-
A Place in the Sun	1951	George Stevens	Paramount Pictures	92	-
The Apartment	1960	Billy Wilder	The Mirisch Company	93	80
Goodfellas	1990	Martin Scorsese	Warner Bros. Pictures, Irwin Winkler Productions	94	92
Pulp Fiction	1994	Quentin Tarantino	A Band Apart, Jersey Films, Miramax Films	95	94
The Searchers	1956	John Ford	C.V. Whitney Pictures	96	12
Bringing Up Baby	1938	Howard Hawks	RKO Radio Pictures	97	88
Unforgiven	1992	Clint Eastwood	The Malpaso Company	98	68
Guess Who's Coming to Dinner	1967	Stanley Kramer	Columbia Pictures	99	-
Yankee Doodle Dandy	1942	Michael Curtiz	Warner Bros. Pictures	100	98
The General	1926	Buster Keaton	Buster Keaton Productions, Joseph M. Schenck Productions	-	18
Intolerance	1916	D.W. Griffith	Reliance-Majestic Studios	-	49
The Fellowship of the Ring	2001	Peter Jackson	New Line Cinema, WingNut Films	-	50
Nashville	1975	Robert Altman	ABC Motion Pictures	-	59
Sullivan's Travels	1941	Preston Sturges	Paramount Pictures	-	61
Cabaret	1972	Bob Fosse	ABC Pictures, Allied Artists	-	63
Who's Afraid of Virginia Woolf?	1966	Mike Nichols	Warner Bros.	-	67
Saving Private Ryan	1998	Steven Spielberg	Amblin Entertainment, Paramount Pictures DreamWorks Pictures	-	71
The Shawshank Redemption	1994	Frank Darabont	Castle Rock Entertainment	-	72
In the Heat of the Night	1967	Norman Jewison	The Mirisch Corporation	-	75
All the President's Men	1976	Alan J. Pakula	Wildwood Enterprises	-	77
Spartacus	1960	Stanley Kubrick	Bryna Productions, Universal Pictures	-	81
Sunrise	1927	F.W. Murnau	Fox Film Corporation	-	82
Titanic	1997	James Cameron	Lightstorm Entertainment, 20th Century Fox Paramount Pictures	-	83
A Night at the Opera	1935	Sam Wood	Metro-Goldwyn-Mayer	-	85
12 Angry Men	1957	Sidney Lumet	Orion-Nova Productions, United Artists	-	87
The Sixth Sense	1999	M. Night Shyamalan	Hollywood Pictures	-	89
Swing Time	1936	George Stevens	RKO Radio Pictures	-	90
Sophie's Choice	1982	Alan J. Pakula	ITC Entertainment	-	91
The Last Picture Show	1971	Peter Bogdanovich	BBS Productions	-	95
Do the Right Thing	1989	Spike Lee	40 Acres and a Mule Filmworks	-	96
Blade Runner	1982	Ridley Scott	The Ladd Company, Shaw Brothers	-	97
Toy Story	1995	John Lasseter	Walt Disney Pictures, Pixar Animation Studios	-	99

=== 2007 changes ===
Twenty-three films were replaced in the 2007 tenth anniversary list. Doctor Zhivago, previously ranked #39, was the highest-ranked film to be dropped from the updated list, while The General at #18 was the highest-ranked new entry.

== Broadcast history ==
=== Presentation broadcast on CBS ===
A 145-minute presentation of the 100 films aired on CBS on June 16, 1998.

=== Presentation broadcast on TNT ===
A 460-minute version aired as a 10-part series on TNT, narrated by James Woods and hosted by American talents as follows:

- Richard Gere hosted the episode "Against the Grain"
- Richard Gere hosted the episode "Beyond the Law"
- Sally Field hosted the episode "Family Portraits"
- Jodie Foster hosted the episode "In Search of..."
- Sally Field hosted the episode "Love Crazy"
- Richard Gere hosted the episode "War & Peace"
- Sally Field hosted the episode "The Wilder Shores of Love"
- Jodie Foster hosted the episode "The Antiheroes"
- Richard Gere hosted the episode "Out of Control"
- Jodie Foster hosted the episode "Fantastic Flights"

=== Presentation broadcast on TNT UK ===
Another version of the same 460-minute program was produced by Monique De Villiers and John Heyman from A World Production company to British television and market featuring different interviews and each segment being hosted by British talents in the following order:

- Michael Caine hosted and narrated episode "Against the Grain"
- Ray Winstone hosted and narrated "Beyond the Law"
- Emily Watson hosted and narrated "Family Portraits"
- Richard Harris hosted and narrated "In Search of..."
- Joely Richardson hosted and narrated episode "Love Crazy"
- Jeremy Irons hosted and narrated episode "War and Peace"
- Liam Neeson hosted and narrated episode "The Wilder Shores of Love"
- Judi Dench hosted and narrated episode "The Anti-Heroes"
- Jude Law hosted and narrated episode "Out of Control"
- Helena Bonham Carter hosted and narrated "Fantastic Flights"

== Criticisms ==
As with awards, the list of those who vote and the final vote tally are not released to the public.

On June 26, 1998, the Chicago Reader published an article by film critic Jonathan Rosenbaum which offers a detailed response to the movies in the AFI list, as well as criticism of the AFI's appropriation of British films, such as Lawrence of Arabia (albeit with aforementioned American funding) and The Third Man. Rosenbaum also produced an alternative list of 100 American movies that he felt had been overlooked by the AFI. Rosenbaum chose to present this alternative list alphabetically since to rank them according to merit would be "tantamount to ranking oranges over apples or declaring cherries superior to grapes."

The AFI's 100 Years...100 Movies (10th Anniversary Edition) list includes three films from Rosenbaum's list (The General, Intolerance and Do the Right Thing), and the accompanying promotional poster lists the titles in alphabetical order.

== See also ==
- BFI Top 100 British films
- List of films considered the best
