= A.I. Artificial Intelligence =

2001 film by Steven Spielberg

- Theatrical release poster
- Directed by: Steven Spielberg
- Screenplay by: Steven Spielberg
- Based on: Screen story by Ian Watson; "Supertoys Last All Summer Long" by Brian Aldiss
- Produced by: Kathleen Kennedy; Steven Spielberg; Bonnie Curtis
- Starring: Haley Joel Osment; Jude Law; Frances O'Connor; Brendan Gleeson; William Hurt
- Cinematography: Janusz Kamiński
- Edited by: Michael Kahn
- Music by: John Williams
- Production companies: Warner Bros. Pictures; DreamWorks Pictures; Amblin Entertainment; Stanley Kubrick Productions
- Distributed by: Warner Bros. Pictures (Note: Distribution of A.I. Artificial Intelligence for all media was split between Warner Bros. Pictures and DreamWorks Pictures. While Warner Bros. handled worldwide theatrical and international home video distribution rights, DreamWorks handled worldwide television and domestic home video distribution rights to the film.)
- Release date: June 29, 2001
- Running time: 146 minutes
- Country: United States
- Language: English
- Budget: $90–100 million
- Box office: $235.9 million

A.I. Artificial Intelligence (or simply A.I.) is a 2001 American science fiction drama film written and directed by Steven Spielberg. The screenplay by Spielberg is based on a screen story by Ian Watson adapting the 1969 short story "Supertoys Last All Summer Long" by Brian Aldiss. Set in a futuristic society, the film stars Haley Joel Osment as David, a childlike android uniquely programmed with the ability to love. Jude Law, Frances O'Connor, Brendan Gleeson and William Hurt star in supporting roles.

Development of A.I. originally began after producer and director Stanley Kubrick acquired the rights to Aldiss's story in the early 1970s. Kubrick hired a series of writers, including Aldiss, Watson, Bob Shaw, and Sara Maitland, until the mid-1990s. The film languished in development hell for years, partly because Kubrick felt that computer-generated imagery was not advanced enough to create the David character, which he believed no child actor would convincingly portray. In 1995, Kubrick handed A.I. to Spielberg while the former's production company remained attached, but the film did not gain momentum until Kubrick died in 1999. Spielberg remained close to Watson's treatment for the screenplay and dedicated the film to Kubrick.

A.I. Artificial Intelligence was released on June 29, 2001, by Warner Bros. Pictures, DreamWorks Pictures, Amblin Entertainment, and Stanley Kubrick Productions. Warner Bros. and DreamWorks shared distribution duties. It received generally positive reviews from critics and grossed $235.9 million against a budget of $90–100 million. It was also nominated for Best Visual Effects and Best Original Score (for John Williams) at the 74th Academy Awards. In a 2016 BBC poll of 177 critics around the world, A.I. Artificial Intelligence was voted the eighty-third greatest film since 2000.

== Plot ==
In the 22nd century, rising sea levels caused by global warming have wiped out coastal cities and altered the world's climate. With the human population in decline, advanced nations have created humanoid robots called mechas (diminutive of Mechanic) to fulfill various roles in society.

In Madison, New Jersey, David, an 11-year-old prototype mecha child capable of experiencing love, is given to Monica Swinton and her husband, Henry, whose son, Martin, is in suspended animation after contracting a rare disease. Initially uncomfortable with David, Monica eventually warms to him and activates his imprinting protocol. Touched by his love for her, she introduces him to Teddy, Martin's old robotic teddy bear, and the two become friends.

After Martin is unexpectedly cured of his disease and brought home, he jealously goads David into cutting off a piece of Monica's hair. That night, David enters his adoptive parents' room, but as Monica turns over, the scissors accidentally poke her in the eye. While Henry attends to her wounds, Teddy picks up the lock of hair from the floor and places it in his pocket. During a pool party, one of Martin's friends pokes David with a knife, triggering his self-protection programming. David grabs Martin, causing both of them to fall into the pool. While Martin is rescued, David is accused of endangering others.

Frightful of David's reactions and fearing for his family's safety, Henry convinces Monica to return David to his creators for destruction. En route, she instead spares David by abandoning him in a forest full of scrap metal and obsolete mechas, telling him to avoid people and find solace with his own kind. Now accompanied solely by Teddy, David recalls The Adventures of Pinocchio and decides to find the Blue Fairy in the hope that she will make him a "real boy" (and therefore worthy of Monica's love).

David and Teddy are captured by the "Flesh Fair", a kind of traveling circus, in which obsolete mechas are destroyed in front of jeering crowds. About to be destroyed himself, David pleads for his life. The audience revolts, allowing David to escape with Gigolo Joe, a prostitute mecha on the run after being framed for murder. David, Teddy, and Joe go to the decadent resort town of Rouge City, where "Dr. Know", a holographic answer engine, directs them to the top of Rockefeller Center in the flooded ruins of New York City.

Above the ruins of New York, David meets Professor Hobby, his creator, who tells him that their meeting demonstrates David's ability to love and desire, as well as to pursue his dreams, like a human. David finds copies of himself, including female variants called "Darlene", ready to be shipped. Disheartened by his lost sense of individuality, David attempts suicide by falling from a skyscraper into the ocean. While underwater, he notices a figure resembling the Blue Fairy, before Joe rescues him in an amphibious aircraft. Before David can explain, authorities capture Joe with an electromagnet. David and Teddy take control of the aircraft to see the Blue Fairy, which turns out to be a statue from an attraction on Coney Island. The two become trapped when the Wonder Wheel falls on their vehicle. Believing that the Blue Fairy is real, David repeatedly asks the statue to turn him into a real boy until his power source is depleted.

Two thousand years later, humanity is allegedly extinct at least on Earth and Manhattan is buried under glacial ice. Mechas have evolved into an advanced form, and a group known as the Specialists, interested in humanity, find and resurrect David and Teddy. They reconstruct the Swinton family home from David's memories before explaining, via an interactive version of the Blue Fairy, that he cannot become human. However, they recreate Monica through genetic material from the strand of hair that Teddy kept. This version of Monica can live for only one day and cannot be revived. David spends his happiest day with Monica, and as she falls asleep in the evening, Monica tells David that she has always loved him. David lies down next to her and closes his eyes as Teddy watches over them.

== Cast ==
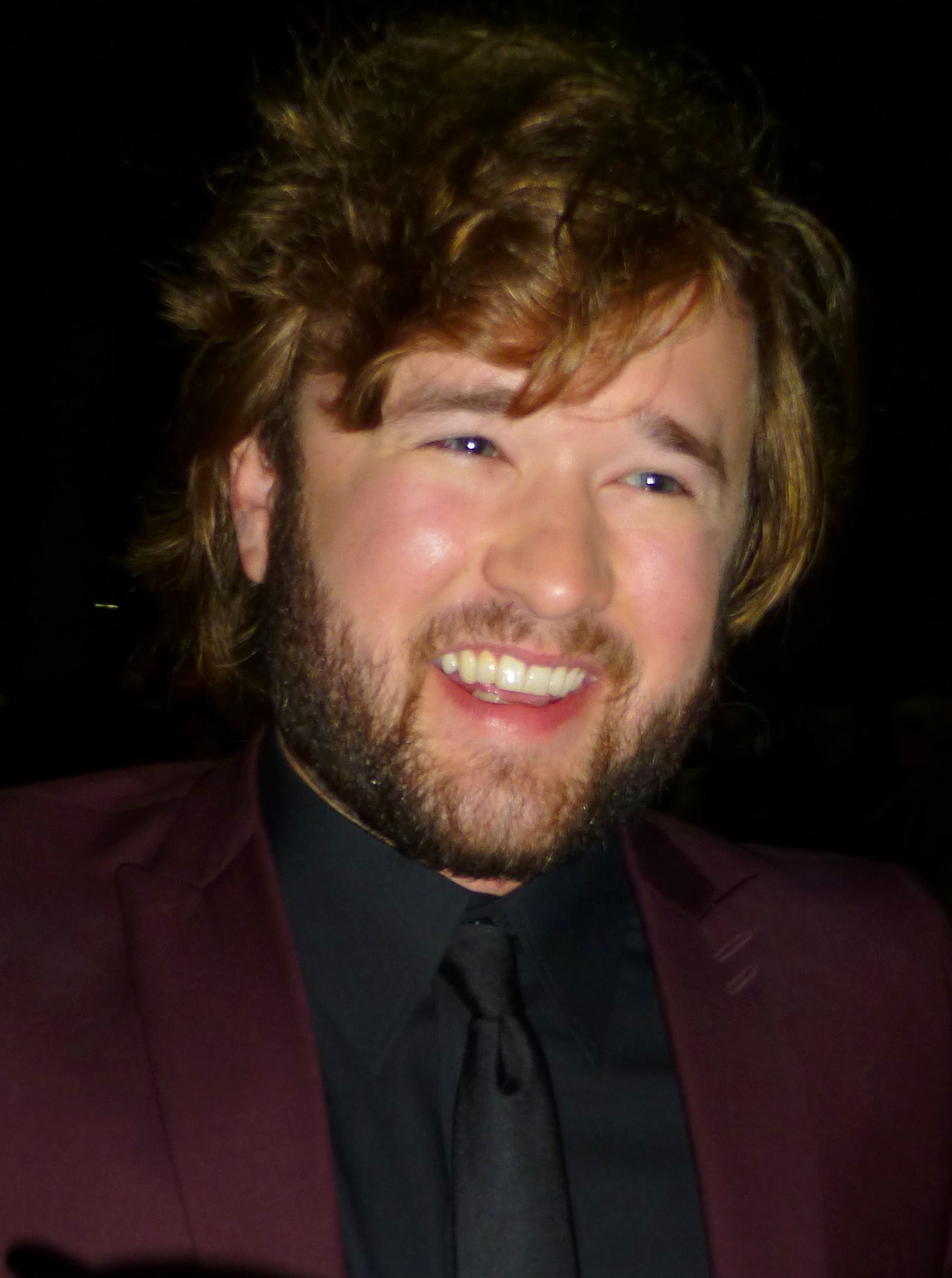
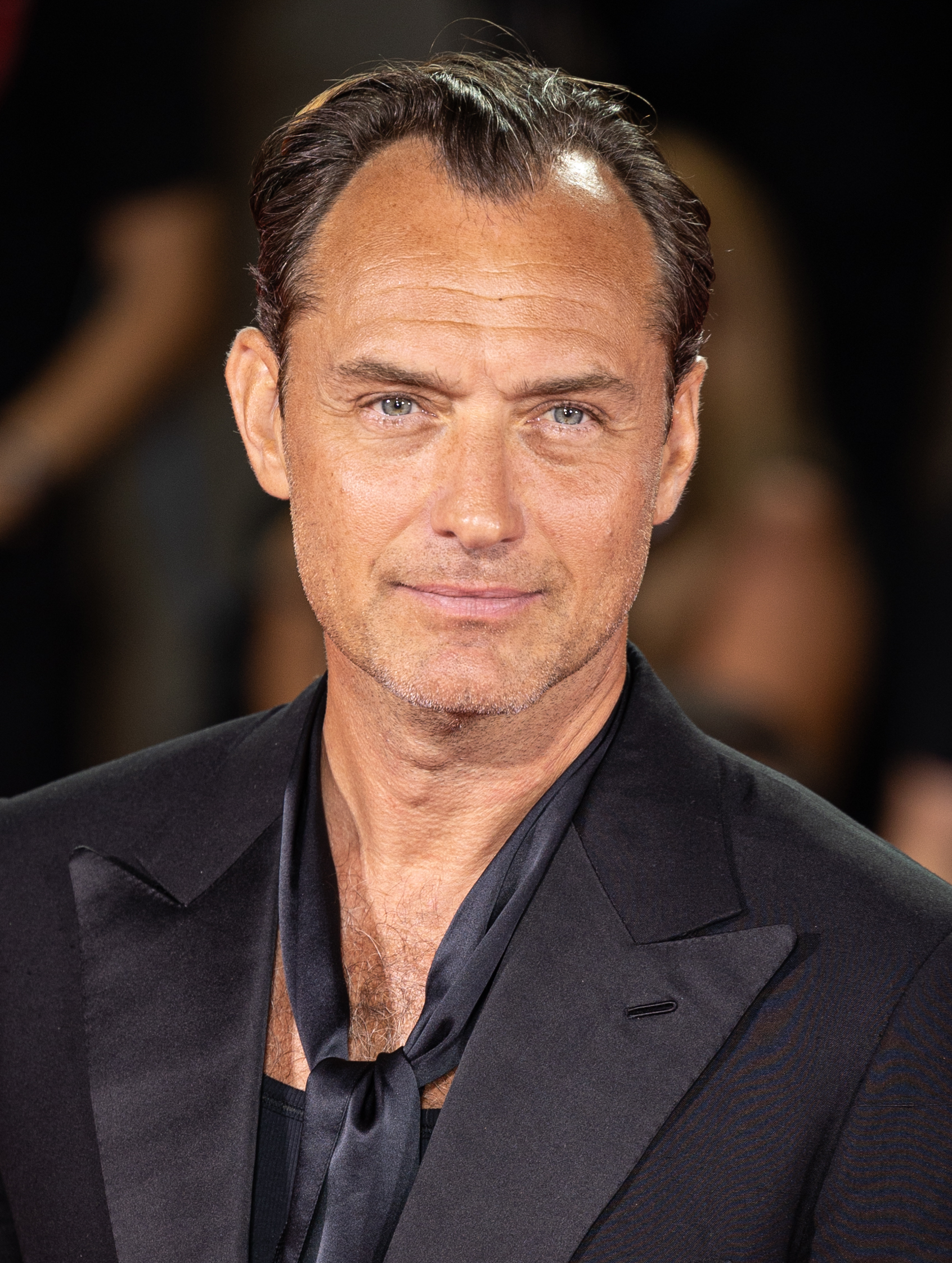
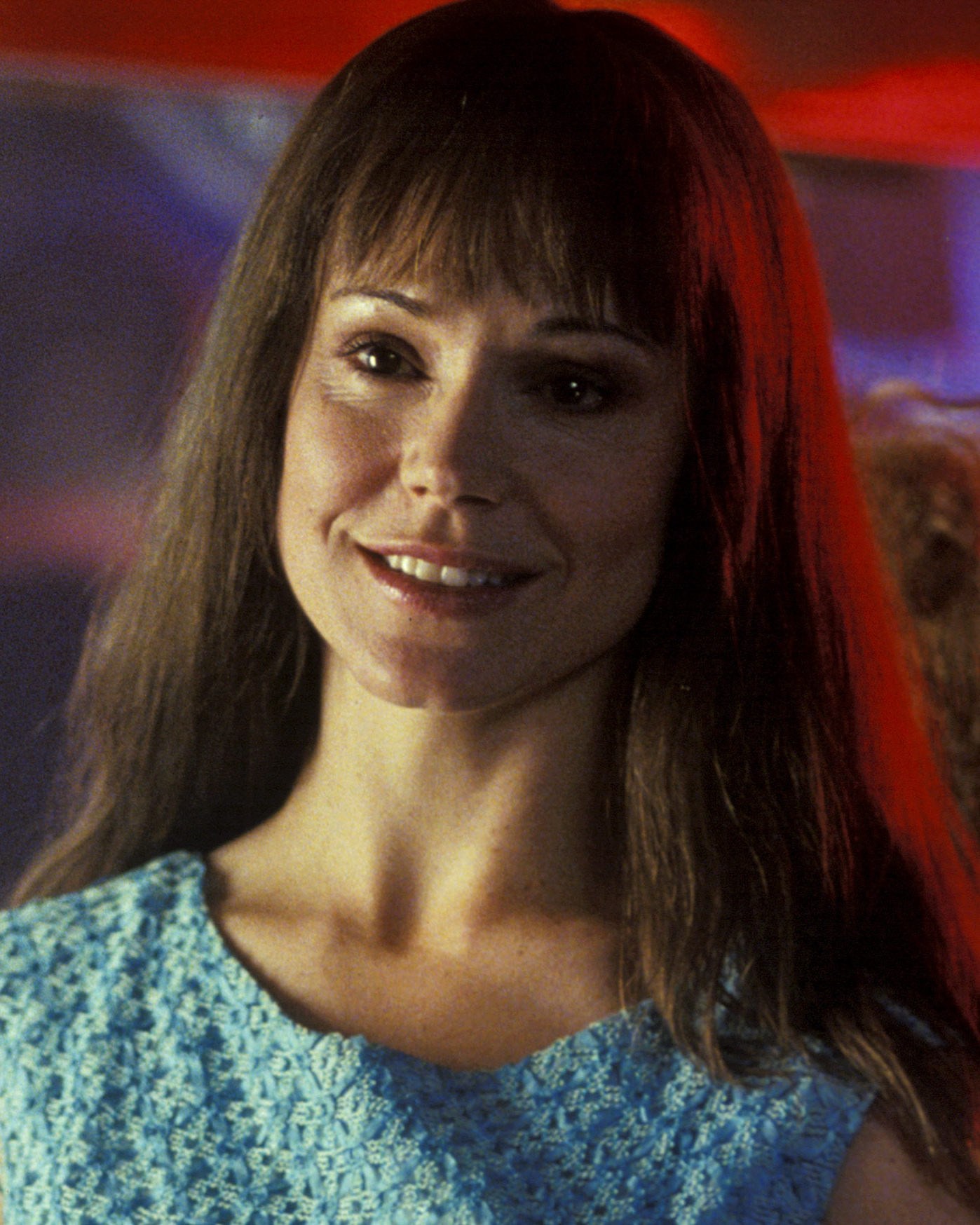
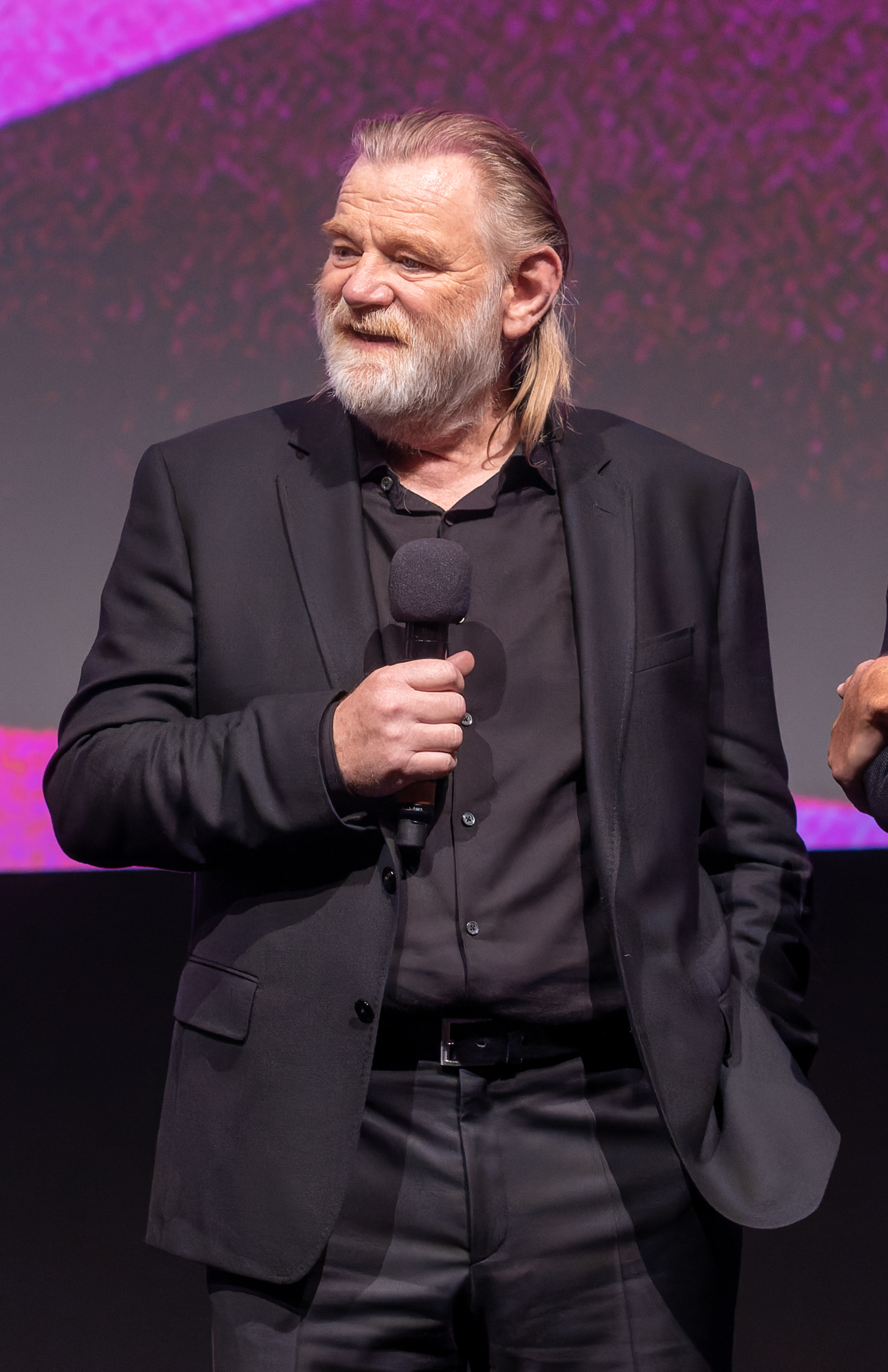
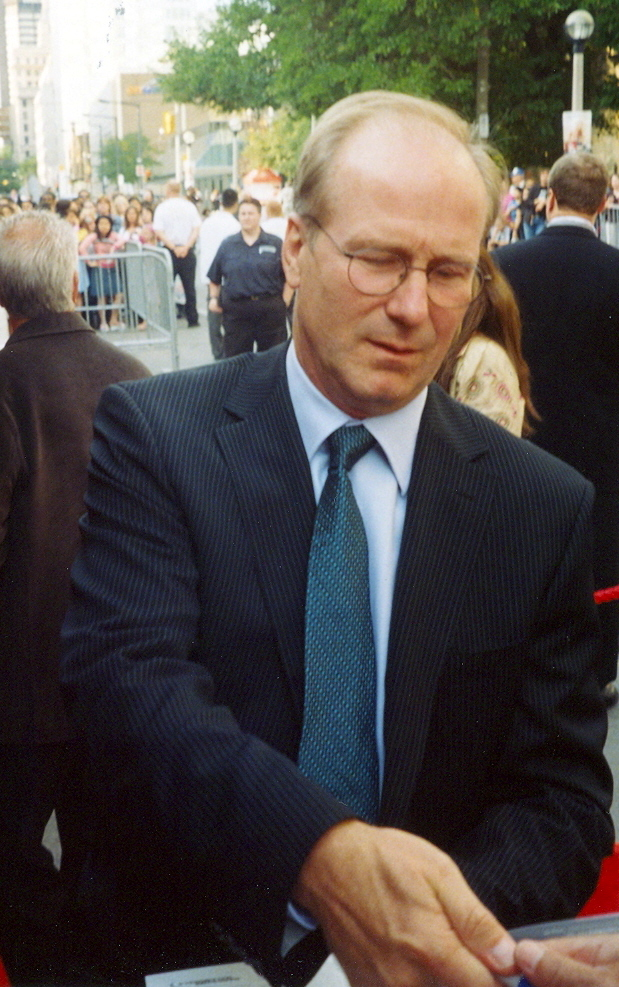
Haley Joel Osment (left), Jude Law, Frances O'Connor, Brendan Gleeson and William Hurt respectively play the roles of David, Gigolo Joe, Monica, Lord Johnson-Johnson and Professor Hobby.
- Haley Joel Osment as David. Osment was Spielberg's first and only choice for the role. To portray the character, Osment avoided blinking his eyes and "programmed" himself with good posture.
- Frances O'Connor as Monica Swinton
- Sam Robards as Henry Swinton
- Jude Law as Gigolo Joe. To prepare for the role, Law studied the acting of Fred Astaire and Gene Kelly, whose movements Joe emulates.
- Jake Thomas as Martin Swinton
- William Hurt as Professor Allen Hobby
- Brendan Gleeson as Flesh Fair impresario Lord Johnson-Johnson
- Jack Angel as Teddy (voice)
- Sabrina Grdevich as Sheila
- April Grace as Female Colleague
- Ken Leung, Matt Winston, Eugene Osment and Clark Gregg as Cybertronics Corp employees
- Enrico Colantoni as The Murderer
- Paula Malcomson as Patricia in Mirrored Room
- Ashley Scott as Gigolo Jane
- Kathryn Morris as Teenage Honey
- Adrian Grenier as Teen in Van
- Daveigh Chase as Singing Girl (deleted scene)
- Robin Williams as Dr. Know (voice)
- Meryl Streep as Blue Fairy (voice)
- Chris Rock as Comedian Robot (voice)
- Erik Bauersfeld as Gardener (voice)
- Ben Kingsley as Specialist (voice)
- Ministry as Flesh Fair band

== Production ==
=== Development ===
Stanley Kubrick began development on an adaptation of "Super-Toys Last All Summer Long" in the late 1970s, hiring the story's author, Brian Aldiss, to write a film treatment. In 1985, Kubrick asked Steven Spielberg to direct the film, with Kubrick producing. Warner Bros. agreed to co-finance A.I. and cover distribution duties. The film labored in development hell, and Aldiss was fired by Kubrick over creative differences in 1989. Bob Shaw briefly served as writer, leaving after six weeks due to Kubrick's demanding work schedule, and Ian Watson was hired as the new writer in March 1990. Aldiss later remarked, "Not only did the bastard fire me, he hired my enemy [Watson] instead." Kubrick handed Watson Carlo Collodi's The Adventures of Pinocchio for inspiration, calling A.I. "a picaresque robot version of Pinocchio".

Three weeks later, Watson gave Kubrick his first story treatment, and concluded his work on A.I. in May 1991 with another treatment of 90 pages. Gigolo Joe was originally conceived as a G.I. mecha, but Watson suggested changing him to a male prostitute. Kubrick joked, "I guess we lost the kiddie market." Meanwhile, Kubrick dropped A.I. to work on a film adaptation of Wartime Lies, feeling computer animation was not advanced enough to create the David character. After the release of Spielberg's Jurassic Park, with its innovative CGI, it was announced in November 1993 that production of A.I. would begin in 1994. Dennis Muren and Ned Gorman, who worked on Jurassic Park, became visual effects supervisors, but Kubrick was displeased with their previsualization, and with the expense of hiring Industrial Light & Magic (ILM) and Stan Winston Studio.

"Stanley [Kubrick] showed Steven [Spielberg] 650 drawings which he had, and the script and the story, everything. Stanley said, 'Look, why don't you direct it and I'll produce it.' Steven was almost in shock."

— Producer Jan Harlan, on Spielberg's first meeting with Kubrick about A.I.

Kubrick asked Sara Maitland to give the film mythic resonance. She recalls "He never referred to the film as 'A.I.'; he always called it 'Pinocchio.'" Kubrick's version ended the same way Spielberg's does, with advanced mechas reviving Monica, but only for a day.

=== Pre-production ===
In early 1994, the film was in pre-production with Christopher "Fangorn" Baker as concept artist and Sara Maitland assisting on the story, which gave it "a feminist fairy-tale focus". Chris Cunningham became the new visual effects supervisor. Some of his unproduced work for A.I. can be seen on the DVD The Work of Director Chris Cunningham.

Aside from considering computer animation, Kubrick also had Joseph Mazzello do a screen test for the lead role. Cunningham helped assemble a series of "little robot-type humans" for the David character. "We tried to construct a little boy with a movable rubber face to see whether we could make it look appealing," producer Jan Harlan reflected. "But it was a total failure, it looked awful." Hans Moravec was brought in as a technical consultant. Meanwhile, Kubrick and Harlan thought that A.I. would be closer to Steven Spielberg's sensibilities as director. Kubrick handed the position to Spielberg in 1995, but Spielberg chose to direct other projects and convinced Kubrick to remain as director. The film was put on hold due to Kubrick's commitment to Eyes Wide Shut (1999).

After Kubrick's death in March 1999, Harlan and Christiane Kubrick approached Spielberg to take over the director's position. By November 1999, Spielberg was writing the screenplay based on Watson's 90-page story treatment. It was his first solo screenplay credit since Close Encounters of the Third Kind (1977). Pre-production was briefly halted during February 2000 because Spielberg pondered directing other projects, which were Harry Potter and the Philosopher's Stone, Minority Report and Memoirs of a Geisha. The following month, Spielberg announced that A.I. would be his next project, with Minority Report as a follow-up. When he decided to fast track A.I., Spielberg brought back Chris Baker as concept artist. Ian Watson reported that the final script was very faithful to Kubrick's vision; even the ending, which is often attributed to Spielberg, saying, "The final 20 minutes are pretty close to what I wrote for Stanley, and what Stanley wanted, faithfully filmed by Spielberg without added schmaltz".

=== Filming and visual effects ===
The original start date was July 10, 2000, but filming was delayed until August. Aside from a couple of weeks of shooting on location in Oxbow Regional Park in Oregon, A.I. was shot entirely using sound stages at Warner Bros. Studios and the Spruce Goose Dome in Long Beach, California.

Spielberg copied Kubrick's obsessively secretive approach to filmmaking by refusing to give the complete script to cast and crew, banning press from the set, and making actors sign confidentiality agreements. For instance, Jack Angel, who voiced Teddy, recorded his lines entirely out of context, only receiving direction to sound like Eeyore from Winnie the Pooh, except "very wise and old and stoic". However, Spielberg asked Angel to be on the set every day to make line alterations wherever he felt necessary. Spielberg initially wanted to follow Kubrick's vision to have David as a robot, he hired Stan Winston to build an animatronic of David until it was dropped after Spielberg and the crew saw Osment's performance in The Sixth Sense. Social robotics expert Cynthia Breazeal served as technical consultant during production. Costume designer Bob Ringwood studied pedestrians on the Las Vegas Strip for his influence on the Rouge City extras. Visual effects, such as removing the visible rods controlling Teddy and removing Haley Joel Osment's breath, were provided in-houses by PDI/DreamWorks.

=== Casting ===
Julianne Moore and Gwyneth Paltrow were considered for the role of Monica Swinton before Frances O'Connor was cast. Jerry Seinfeld was originally considered to voice and play the Comedian Robot before Chris Rock was cast. Kathryn Morris appeared as a singer named Teenage Honey but was cut from the film.

=== Allusions ===
A. O. Scott notes Spielberg's homages to Kubrick, "sly references to A Clockwork Orange, The Shining and predominantly 2001: A Space Odyssey", as well as Collodi's Pinocchio. The lines Dr. Know quotes are from W. B. Yeats's "The Stolen Child":

Come away, O human child!
To the waters and the wild
With a faery, hand in hand,
For the world’s more full of weeping
than you can understand.

— W. B. Yeats, The Stolen Child

== Soundtrack ==
The film's soundtrack album was released by Warner Sunset Records in 2001. The original score was composed and conducted by John Williams, performed by the Hollywood Studio Symphony and features singers Lara Fabian on two songs and Josh Groban on one. The film's score also had a limited release as an official "For your consideration Academy Promo", as well as a complete score issued by La-La Land Records in 2015. The band Ministry appears in the film playing the song "What About Us?", but the song does not appear on the official soundtrack album.

Williams called his score an "homage a Kubrick". He includes echoes of György Ligeti's choral music, which Kubrick used in 2001: A Space Odyssey. Per Kubrick's request, Williams included a quotation of Richard Strauss's Der Rosenkavalier in his score.

== Release ==
=== Marketing ===
The teaser trailer debuted on December 8, 2000, with the theatrical release of Proof of Life. Warner Bros. used an alternate reality game titled The Beast to promote the film. Over forty websites were created by Atomic Pictures in New York City (kept online at Cloudmakers.org), including the website for Cybertronics Corp. There were to be a series of video games for the Xbox video game console that followed the storyline of The Beast, but they went undeveloped. To avoid audiences mistaking A.I. for a family film, no action figures were created, although Hasbro released a talking Teddy following the film's release in June 2001. A.I. premiered at the Venice Film Festival in 2001.

=== Home media ===
A.I. Artificial Intelligence was released on VHS and DVD in the United States by DreamWorks Home Entertainment on March 5, 2002, in widescreen and fullscreen two-disc special editions featuring an extensive sixteen-part documentary detailing the film's development, production, visual effects, sound design and music. The bonuses also include interviews with Haley Joel Osment, Jude Law, Frances O'Connor, Steven Spielberg and John Williams, two teaser trailers for the film's original theatrical release, and an extensive photo gallery featuring production stills and Stanley Kubrick's original storyboards. It was released overseas by Warner Home Video.

The film was released on Blu-ray in Japan by Warner Home Video on December 22, 2010, followed shortly by a United States release by Paramount Home Entertainment (Paramount currently owns the pre-2010 live-action DreamWorks catalog) on April 5, 2011. This Blu-ray features the film remastered in high-definition and incorporates all the bonus features previously included on the two-disc special-edition DVD.

The film will release on 4K Ultra Blu-ray by Paramount Home Entertainment on December 15, 2026.

== Reception ==
=== Box office ===
The film opened in 3,242 theaters in the United States and Canada on June 29, 2001, earning $29.35 million at #1 during its opening weekend. A.I. went on to gross $78.62 million in the United States and Canada. Opening on 524 screens in Japan, A.I. grossed almost two billion Yen in its first five days, the biggest June opening in Japan at the time, and sold more tickets in its opening weekend than Star Wars: Episode I – The Phantom Menace, although it grossed slightly less. It went on to gross $78 million in Japan. It grossed $157 million in other countries, for a worldwide total of $235.93 million.

=== Critical response ===
On Rotten Tomatoes, A.I. Artificial Intelligence holds an approval rating of 76% based on reviews from 201 critics, with an average rating of 6.60/10. The website's critical consensus reads, "A curious, not always seamless, amalgamation of Kubrick's chilly bleakness and Spielberg's warm-hearted optimism. A.I. is, in a word, fascinating." On Metacritic, it has a weighted average score of 65 out of 100 based on reviews from 32 critics, which indicates "generally favorable reviews". Audiences surveyed by CinemaScore gave the film an average grade of "C+" on a scale of A+ to F.

A. O. Scott writes, "Mr. Spielberg seems to be attempting the improbable feat of melding Kubrick's chilly, analytical style with his own warmer, needier sensibility. He tells the story slowly and films it with lucid, mesmerizing objectivity, creating a mood as layered, dissonant and strange as John Williams's unusually restrained, modernist score." He concludes, "The very end somehow fuses the cathartic comfort of infantile wish fulfillment -- the dream that the first perfect love whose loss we experience as the fall from Eden might be restored -- with a feeling almost too terrible to acknowledge or to name. Refusing to cuddle us or lull us into easy sleep, Mr. Spielberg locates the unspoken moral of all our fairy tales. To be real is to be mortal; to be human is to love, to dream and to perish." Richard Corliss of Time magazine heavily praised Spielberg's direction, as well as the cast and visual effects. Roger Ebert of the Chicago Sun-Times gave the film three stars out of a possible four, saying that it is "wonderful and maddening". Film critic Armond White of the New York Press praised the film, noting that "each part of David's journey through carnal and sexual universes into the final eschatological devastation becomes as profoundly philosophical and contemplative as anything by cinema's most thoughtful, speculative artists – Borzage, Ozu, Demy, Tarkovsky."

Jonathan Rosenbaum of the Chicago Reader compared A.I. to Solaris (1972), and praised both "Kubrick for proposing that Spielberg direct the project and Spielberg for doing his utmost to respect Kubrick's intentions while making it a profoundly personal work".

Peter Travers of Rolling Stone magazine gave a mixed review, concluding, "Spielberg cannot live up to Kubrick's darker side of the future", but still put the film on his top ten list that year. James Berardinelli found the film "consistently involving, with moments of near-brilliance, but far from a masterpiece. In fact, as the long-awaited 'collaboration' of Kubrick and Spielberg, it ranks as something of a disappointment." Of the film's highly debated finale, he claimed, "There is no doubt that the concluding 30 minutes are all Spielberg; the outstanding question is where Kubrick's vision left off and Spielberg's began." John Simon of the National Review described A.I. "as an uneasy mix of trauma and treacle".

Leonard Maltin, on the other hand, gives the film two stars out of four in his Movie Guide, writing, "[The] intriguing story draws us in, thanks in part to Osment's exceptional performance, but takes several wrong turns; ultimately, it just doesn't work. Spielberg rewrote the adaptation Stanley Kubrick commissioned of the Brian Aldiss short story Super Toys Last All Summer Long; [the] result is a curious and uncomfortable hybrid of Kubrick and Spielberg sensibilities"; However, Maltin called John Williams' music score "striking". Mick LaSalle of the San Francisco Chronicle gave a largely negative review. "A.I. exhibits all its creators' bad traits and none of the good. So we end up with the structureless, meandering, slow-motion endlessness of Kubrick combined with the fuzzy, cuddly mindlessness of Spielberg." Dubbing it Spielberg's "first boring movie", LaSalle also believed that the robots at the end of the film were aliens, and compared Gigolo Joe to the "useless" Jar Jar Binks, yet praised Robin Williams for his portrayal of a futuristic Albert Einstein.

Filmmaker Billy Wilder hailed A.I. as "the most underrated film of the past few years". When British filmmaker Ken Russell saw the film, he wept during the ending.

Executive producer Jan Harlan stated that Kubrick "would have applauded" the final film, while Kubrick's widow Christiane also enjoyed A.I. Aldiss admired the film as well: "I thought what an inventive, intriguing, ingenious, involving film this was. There are flaws in it and I suppose I might have a personal quibble but it's so long since I wrote it." Of the film's ending, he wondered how it might have been had Kubrick directed the film: "That is one of the 'ifs' of film history—at least the ending indicates Spielberg adding some sugar to Kubrick's wine. The actual ending is overly sympathetic and moreover rather overtly engineered by a plot device that does not really bear credence. But it's a brilliant piece of film and of course it's a phenomenon because it contains the energies and talents of two brilliant filmmakers."

=== Reaction to critiques ===
Watson has speculated, "Worldwide, A.I. was very successful (and the 4th-highest earner of the year) but it didn't do quite so well in America, because the film, so I'm told, was too poetical and intellectual in general for American tastes. Plus, quite a few critics in America misunderstood the film, thinking for instance that the Giacometti-style beings in the final 20 minutes were aliens (whereas they were robots of the future who had evolved themselves from the robots in the earlier part of the film) and also thinking that the final 20 minutes were a sentimental addition by Spielberg, whereas those scenes were exactly what I wrote for Stanley and exactly what he wanted, filmed faithfully by Spielberg." (Note: Despite Mr. Watson's reference to worldwide box office of 4th, the movie actually finished 16th worldwide among 2001 movie releases.)

Spielberg responded to some of the criticisms of the film, stating that many of the "so called sentimental" elements of A.I., including the ending, were in fact Kubrick's, and the darker elements were his own. However, Sara Maitland, who worked on the project with Kubrick in the 1990s, said that Kubrick never started production on A.I. because he had a hard time making the ending work.

In 2002, Spielberg told film critic Joe Leydon:

"People pretend to think they know Stanley Kubrick, and think they know me, when most of them don't know either of us... And what's really funny about that is, all the parts of A.I. that people assume were Stanley's were mine. And all the parts of A.I. that people accuse me of sweetening and softening and sentimentalizing were all Stanley's. The teddy bear was Stanley's. The whole last 20 minutes of the movie was completely Stanley's. The whole first 35, 40 minutes of the film—all the stuff in the house—was word for word, from Stanley's screenplay. This was Stanley's vision... Eighty percent of the critics got it all mixed up. But I could see why. Because, obviously, I've done a lot of movies where people have cried and have been sentimental. And I've been accused of sentimentalizing hard-core material. But in fact it was Stanley who did the sweetest parts of A.I., not me. I'm the guy who did the dark center of the movie, with the Flesh Fair and everything else. That's why he wanted me to make the movie in the first place. He said, 'This is much closer to your sensibilities than my own.'" Spielberg said, "While there was divisiveness when A.I. came out, I felt that I had achieved Stanley's wishes, or goals."

=== Re-appraisal ===
In 2009, Jonathan Rosenbaum described A.I. as "a very great and deeply misunderstood film", noting that Andrew Sarris, Stan Brakhage and James Naremore "more or less" agreed with this assessment. A decade after his initial review, Roger Ebert gave the film a full four stars and added it to his "Great Movies" canon in 2011.

On re-watching the film many years after its release, BBC film critic Mark Kermode apologized to Spielberg in a January 2013 interview for "getting it wrong" on the film when he first viewed it in 2001. He came to believe that the film is Spielberg's "enduring masterpiece".

In July 2025, it was one of the films voted for the "Readers' Choice" edition of The New York Times' list of "The 100 Best Movies of the 21st Century," finishing at number 258. That same month, it ranked number 61 on Rolling Stone's list of "The 100 Best Movies of the 21st Century."

== Accolades ==
Visual effects supervisors Dennis Muren, Stan Winston, Michael Lantieri and Scott Farrar were nominated for the Academy Award for Best Visual Effects, and John Williams was nominated for Best Original Music Score. Steven Spielberg, Jude Law and Williams received nominations at the 59th Golden Globe Awards. A.I. was successful at the Saturn Awards, winning five awards, including Best Science Fiction Film along with Best Writing for Spielberg and Best Performance by a Younger Actor for Osment.

Award	Date of ceremony	Category	Recipient(s)	Result	Ref.
Academy Awards	March 24, 2002	Best Original Music Score	John Williams	Nominated	
Academy Awards	March 24, 2002	Best Visual Effects	Dennis Muren, Stan Winston, Michael Lantieri, Scott Farrar	Nominated	
British Academy Film Awards	February 24, 2002	Best Visual Effects	Dennis Muren, Scott Farrar, Michael Lantieri	Nominated	
Chicago Film Critics Association	February 25, 2002	Best Supporting Actor	Jude Law	Nominated	
Chicago Film Critics Association	February 25, 2002	Best Original Music Score	John Williams	Nominated	
Chicago Film Critics Association	February 25, 2002	Best Cinematography	Janusz Kamiński	Nominated	
Empire Awards	February 5, 2002	Best Film	A.I. Artificial Intelligence	Nominated	
Empire Awards	February 5, 2002	Best Director	Steven Spielberg	Nominated	
Empire Awards	February 5, 2002	Best Actor	Haley Joel Osment	Nominated	
Empire Awards	February 5, 2002	Best Actress	Frances O'Connor	Nominated	
Golden Globes	January 20, 2002	Best Director	Steven Spielberg	Nominated	
Golden Globes	January 20, 2002	Best Supporting Actor	Jude Law	Nominated	
Golden Globes	January 20, 2002	Best Original Score	John Williams	Nominated	
Saturn Awards	June 10, 2002	Best Science Fiction Film	A.I. Artificial Intelligence	Won	
Saturn Awards	June 10, 2002	Best Director	Steven Spielberg	Nominated	
Saturn Awards	June 10, 2002	Best Writing	Steven Spielberg	Won	
Saturn Awards	June 10, 2002	Best Actress	Frances O'Connor	Nominated	
Saturn Awards	June 10, 2002	Best Performance by a Younger Actor	Haley Joel Osment	Won	
Saturn Awards	June 10, 2002	Best Special Effects	Dennis Muren, Scott Farrar, Michael Lantieri, Stan Winston	Won	
Saturn Awards	June 10, 2002	Best Music	John Williams	Won	
Young Artist Awards	April 7, 2002	Best Leading Young Actor	Haley Joel Osment	Nominated	
Young Artist Awards	April 7, 2002	Best Supporting Young Actor	Jake Thomas	Won	

American Film Institute nominated the film in AFI's 100 Years of Film Scores.

== See also ==
- List of underwater science fiction works

== Bibliography ==
- Harlan, Jan; Struthers, Jane M. (2009). A.I. Artificial Intelligence: From Stanley Kubrick to Steven Spielberg: The Vision Behind the Film. London: Thames & Hudson. ISBN 9780500514894.
- Rice, Julian (2017). Kubrick's Story: Spielberg's Film: A.I. Artificial Intelligence. Rowman & Littlefield. ISBN 9781442278189.
