= Peter Harlan =

German musical instrument maker and luth player

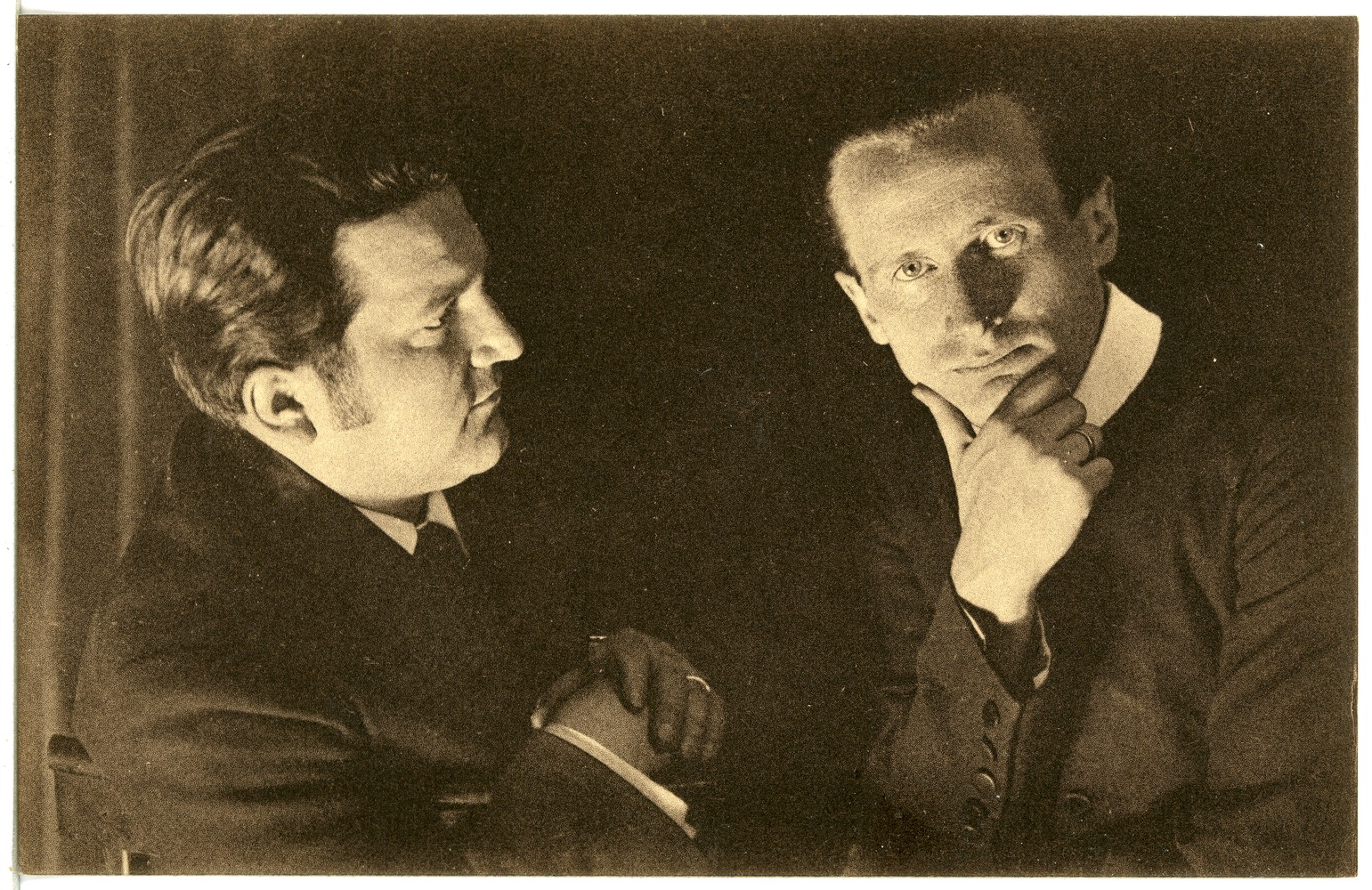
- Peter Harlan (left) in 1920s
- Born: February 26, 1898; Berlin, Germany
- Died: January 13, 1966 (aged 67); Burg Sternberg, Lippe, West Germany
- Occupations: Musician, instrument maker
- Relatives: Veit Harlan (brother); Thomas Harlan (nephew); Christiane Kubrick (niece); Jan Harlan (nephew); Stanley Kubrick (nephew-in-law); Vivian Kubrick (great niece)

Peter Harlan (26 February 1898 – 13 January 1966) was a German multi-instrumentalist and musical instrument maker. In the 1920s he was an employee of the Munich magazine Der Gitarrenfreund.

== Life and work ==
Peter Harlan came from an artistic family. He was the son of writer Walter Harlan and brother of film director Veit Harlan (Jud Süß).

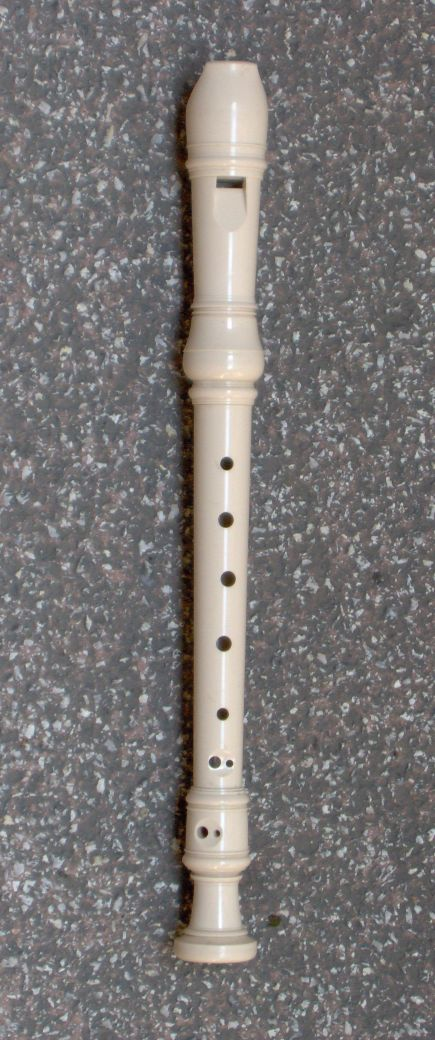
Recorder with German fingering. Note that the fourth finger-hole is larger than the fifth.

After graduating from high school, Harlan took up an apprenticeship as a string instrument maker with Ernst Wilhelm Kunze and later founded his own workshop for the construction of medieval instruments in the musical instrument region of Markneukirchen, Vogtlandkreis, Germany. In the 1920s, Harlan was introduced to recorders by Wilibald Gurlitt at Freiburg im Breisgau. Harlan stated later that he had built his first recorder in 1921. In 1925, he visited the German music researcher Max Seiffert and the leading expert for old chamber music Arnold Dolmetsch in England. In 1926, he had a recorder built by other wind instrument makers. The result of these attempts was the still familiar German fingering recorder, which became an easy and fast-to-learn instrument. Both well-known songs as well as classical repertoire could be played. This "Bärenreiter-Blockföte" from the "Harlan workshops" spread rapidly due to its low price of just four Reichsmark.

Inspired by Gurlitt, Harlan developed not only recorders but also fiddles, viols and clavichords based on historical models. His most significant work was the development of the construction of the Fidel. His special concern was to make this six-stringed string instrument, which he constructed from a viola da gamba's basic frame, into a layman's instrument for the future. The Fidel and the recorder gained popularity among those new to playing music because of their easy-to-learn style of playing.

In 1930, he founded the Harlan Trio with musicologist Cornelia Schröder-Auerbach and violist and composer Hanning Schröder. The Trio were pioneers in the field of historical performance, playing music from the Middle Ages to the Baroque.

In The Second World War, he served as a Luftwaffe Officer. in December 1944, he was in command of Castle Sternberg in the Lippe district. In the last days of the war in 1945, he refused the order to destroy the castle by means of a few barrels of gasoline and waited for the invasion of the Allied troops in Lemgo, so that the castle fell into their hands without a fight.

In 1947, Harlan leased Sternberg Castle, resumed building instruments there and built the castle into an important training centre for German music. For this purpose, a varied learning and presentation program has been established, which consisted of courses in playing the Fidel, courses for the DIY of musical instruments, but also small concerts, puppetry and castle tours. Until his death, he assisted countless children to take their first steps in the field of music by playing, building their own or buying simple musical instruments.

After Harlan's death, his sons Till and Klaus Harlan continued their father's work at Sternberg Castle.

== Sources ==
- Bolton, Phillipe, German fingerings on the recorder
- Bolton, Phillipe, The Revival of the Recorder
- Jendreck, Frank (January–February 2016), "Gründer der Musikburg Sternberg. Peter Harlan zum 50. Todestag", Heimatland Lippe. Zeitschrift des Lippischen Heimatbundes und des Landesverbands (in German), Lippe, pp. 29ff
- Lander, Nicholas S (2017), Recorder Home Page: History: Modern period
- Moeck, Hermann Alexander (1980), Zur 'Nachgeschichte' und Renaissance der Blockflöte (in German), Edition Moeck Nr. 4021
- Peter Harlan Artikel (in German), jugendbewegung.de, archived from the original on 26 September 2010
- Windkanal (in German), Fulda: Conrad Mollenhauer
