= Theater am Schiffbauerdamm =

Theatre building in Berlin, Germany

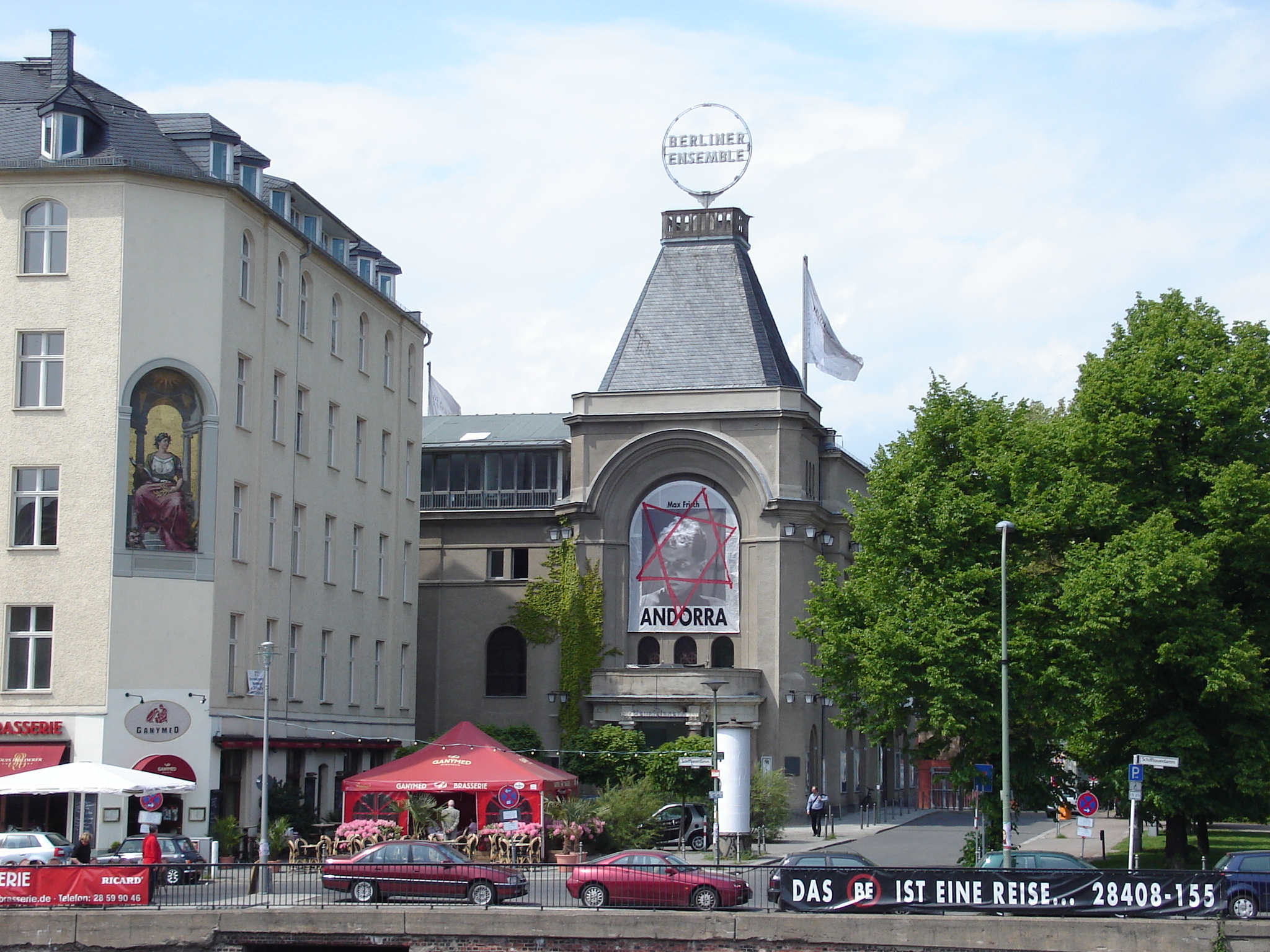
- Theater am Schiffbauerdamm, from the Spree river
- Interactive map of Theater am Schiffbauerdamm
- Address: Bertolt-Brecht-Platz 1
- Location: Berlin, Germany
- Coordinates: 52°31′18″N 13°23′10″E
- Type: Theatre

Construction
- Built: 1892
- Opened: 19 November 1892
- Architect: Heinrich Seeling

Website
- berliner-ensemble.de

The Theater am Schiffbauerdamm (German pronunciation: [teˈaːtɐ ʔam ˈʃɪfbaʊɐˌdam]) is a theatre building at the Schiffbauerdamm riverside in the Mitte district of Berlin, Germany, opened on 19 November 1892. Since 1954, it has been home to the Berliner Ensemble theatre company, founded in 1949 by Helene Weigel and Bertolt Brecht.

The original name of the Neo-baroque construction by the architect Heinrich Seeling was Neues Theater. The first performance was Johann Wolfgang von Goethe's play Iphigenie auf Tauris. Die Weber, a naturalistic drama by Gerhart Hauptmann, had its premiere in a private audience at the theatre on 26 February 1893. From 1903 to 1906, the Neues Theater was under the management of Max Reinhardt; it later became the site of numerous operetta performances.

With the premiere of the comedy Der fröhliche Weinberg by Carl Zuckmayer on 22 December 1925, the theatre returned to dramatic art, followed by the first performances of The Threepenny Opera (Die Dreigroschenoper) on 31 August 1928 and of the Italienische Nacht by Ödön von Horváth on 20 March 1931. Bertolt Brecht staged Marieluise Fleißer's play Pioneers in Ingolstadt on 30 March 1929, causing a scandal. The theatre saw Gustaf Gründgens giving his debut as a director with Jean Cocteau's Orphée and guest performances by the Truppe 31 stage company of Gustav von Wangenheim.

From 1931 on, the theatre was called Deutsches Nationaltheater am Schiffbauerdamm. Notable actors included Lotte Lenya, Carola Neher, Hilde Körber, Helene Weigel, Ernst Busch, Ernst Deutsch, Kurt Gerron, Theo Lingen, and Peter Lorre. With the Nazi takeover in 1933, the theatre declined and was finally closed in 1944. Veit Harlan made his directoral debut there in 1935 with Wolfgang Böttcher's musical comedy Marriage on the Panke.

Reopened after World War II, the theatre was finally taken over by Bertolt Brecht. Today, it is considered one of the most glamorous theatres in Germany and the building is currently undergoing historic preservation.
