= The Ruler =

German 1937 film

- Directed by: Veit Harlan
- Written by: Curt J. Braun; Thea von Harbou; Harald Bratt
- Based on: The Ruler by Gerhart Hauptmann
- Produced by: Karl Julius Fritzsche
- Starring: Emil Jannings; Hannes Stelzer; Hilde Körber
- Cinematography: Günther Anders; Werner Brandes
- Edited by: Martha Dübber
- Music by: Wolfgang Zeller
- Production company: Tobis Film
- Distributed by: Tobis Film
- Release date: 17 March 1937
- Running time: 103 minutes
- Country: Germany
- Language: German

The Ruler (German: Der Herrscher) is a 1937 German drama film directed by Veit Harlan. It was adapted from the play of the same name by Gerhart Hauptmann. Erwin Leiser calls it a propagandistic demonstration of the Führerprinzip of Nazi Germany. The film's sets were designed by the art director Robert Herlth. Location shooting took place around Oberhausen and Pompeii near Naples. It premiered at the Ufa-Palast am Zoo in Berlin.

== Plot ==
Matthias Clausen is the head of Clausen Works, an old and prosperous munitions firm. He falls in love with a secretary in the office, and his children conspire against him in order to protect their inheritance. Clausen disowns them and bestows the firm on the state, confident that one of his workers capable of carrying on his work will arise.

== Cast ==
- Emil Jannings as Matthias Clausen
- Paul Wagner as Professor Wolfgang Clausen - his son
- Hannes Stelzer as Egert - his youngest son
- Hilde Körber as Bettina - his daughter
- Käthe Haack as Ottilie Klamroth - his married daughter
- Herbert Hübner as Direktor Erich Klamroth - her husband
- Maria Koppenhöfer as Paula Clausen - born von Rübsamen
- Marianne Hoppe as Inken Peters
- Helene Fehdmer as Mrs. Peters
- Max Gülstorff as Medical Doctor Geiger
- Harald Paulsen as Judicial Council Hanefeld
- Theodor Loos as Pastor Immoos
- Rudolf Klein-Rogge as Director Bodlfing
- Paul Bildt as Diener Winter
- Walter Werner as Private Secretary Dr. Wuttke
- Heinrich Schroth as Director Hofer
- Hans Stiebner as Director Weißfisch
- Peter Elsholtz as Engineer Dr. Ehrhardt
- Heinz Wemper as Foreman
- Ursula Kurtz as Miss Biel

== Production ==
Curt J. Braun and Thea von Harbou loosely adapted Before Sunset by Nobel Prize recipient Gerhart Hauptmann for the purposes of Nazi propaganda. Clausen's character is significantly changed from being destroyed by his family's greed in the book to renouncing his family and helping rebuild Germany in the film.

Veit Harlan, who directed the film, stated that Joseph Goebbels and Walther Funk directly added Nazi slogans to the script and entirely rewrote Clausen's ending speech. Harlan wanted to leave the project as he felt the play was altered too much, but was kept on by Goebbels. Arnold Räther, the vice president of the Reich Chamber of Film, oversaw the production.

== Reception ==
The Ruler was approved by the censors on 15 March 1937, and premiered on 18 March with Goebbels in attendance. It was banned in Germany after World War II.

Some newspapers objected to the anti-capitalist bent inherent in having a man leave his company to the state; the official release contained a postscript by Goebbels repudiating such intentions. Writing for Night and Day in 1937, Graham Greene gave the film a mildly negative review, criticizing the acting and describing Jannings' portrayal as "the meaningless gaze of a sea-lion". Greene noted that he had enjoyed the "pleasantly savage opening", but that as the film continued it was increasingly necessary for the audience to assign emotions to Jannings' "marine" acting. Meanwhile, the critic for The Brooklyn Daily Eagle concluded, "despite its Nazi propaganda influence, 'The Ruler' is nevertheless a skillfully produced photo-drama, distinguished by a powerful performance by Herr Jannings in the role of the sentimental industrialist". And in England, The Evening Standard reviewer told readers, the film had "the marks of good direction, acting and camera-work. And the presence of Jannings is dynamic as ever."

== Accolades ==
| Award | Date of ceremony | Category | Recipient(s) | Result | Ref. |
|---|---|---|---|---|---|
| Venice Film Festival | 3 September 1937 | Best Actor | Emil Jannings | Won | |

== Works cited ==
- Waldman, Harry (2008). Nazi Films In America, 1933-1942. McFarland & Company. ISBN 9780786438617.
- Welch, David (1983). Propaganda and the German Cinema: 1933-1945. I.B. Tauris. ISBN 9781860645204.

== Bibliography ==
- Hake, Sabine. Popular Cinema of the Third Reich. University of Texas Press, 2001.
- Noack, Frank. Veit Harlan: The Life and Work of a Nazi Filmmaker. University Press of Kentucky, 2016.
- Rentschler, Eric. The Ministry of Illusion: Nazi Cinema and Its Afterlife. Harvard University Press, 1996.
