= S Is for Stanley =

- Directed by: Alex Infascelli
- Written by: Alex Infascelli; Filippo Ulivieri; Vincenzo Scuccimarra
- Produced by: Inti Carboni; Federica Paniccia; Alex Infascelli; Lorenzo Foschi; Davide Luchetti
- Starring: Emilio D'Alessandro; Janette Woolmore; Alex Infascelli
- Cinematography: Edoardo Carlo Bolli; Gigi Martinucci
- Edited by: Alex Infascelli
- Music by: John Cummings
- Distributed by: Rat Pac Documentary Films (North America)
- Release dates: October 2015 (Rome Film Festival); 2016
- Country: Italy
- Languages: English; Italian

S is for Stanley – 30 Years Behind the Wheel for Stanley Kubrick (Italian: S Is for Stanley – Trent'anni dietro al volante per Stanley Kubrick) is a 2015 Italian documentary film co-written and directed by Alex Infascelli. It depicts the relationship between celebrated director Stanley Kubrick and his personal chauffeur and assistant, Emilio D'Alessandro. It was produced by Kinethica and Lock And Valentine. It is based on D'Alessandro's autobiography Stanley Kubrick and Me.

The film won the 2016 David di Donatello Award for Best Documentary. It was also nominated at the 2016 European Film Awards for best documentary film.

The film also won the Master of Art film Festival in the Best Documentary in Theatre and Cinema section.

S is for Stanley has been distributed theatrically in Italy on 30 May 2016 and had its theatrical premiere in the United States in New York at the IFC Centre on 27 January 2017, as part of a Stanley Kubrick series.

It was released for home media on Netflix in North America (US and Canada) on 15 June 2017.

== See also ==
- Personal life of Stanley Kubrick
- List of Italian films of 2015
