= My Son the Minister =

1937 film

- Directed by: Veit Harlan
- Written by: André Birabeau (play); Edgar Kahn; Karl Georg Külb
- Produced by: Erich von Neusser
- Starring: Hans Brausewetter; Heli Finkenzeller; Françoise Rosay
- Cinematography: Günther Anders
- Edited by: Marianne Behr
- Music by: Leo Leux
- Production company: UFA
- Distributed by: UFA
- Release date: 6 July 1937
- Running time: 81 minutes
- Country: Germany
- Language: German

My Son the Minister (German: Mein Sohn, der Herr Minister) is a 1937 German comedy drama film directed by Veit Harlan and starring Hans Brausewetter, Heli Finkenzeller and Françoise Rosay.

The film's sets were designed by the art directors Franz Koehn and Walter Röhrig. It was shot at the Babelsberg Studios in Potsdam.

== Cast ==
- Hans Brausewetter as Robert Fabre-Marines
- Heli Finkenzeller as Nannette - seine Frau
- Françoise Rosay as Sylvie - seine Mutter
- Hans Moser as Gabriel Fabre
- Paul Dahlke as Vaccarés
- Hadrian Maria Netto as Ministerpresident
- Carl Jönsson as Aristide - Diener im Ministerium
- Hilde Körber as Betty Joinville
- Aribert Wäscher as Baroche
- Bruno Ziener as Pierre, Diener
- Carl Auen as Ein Zeitungsreporter
- Josef Dahmen as Ein revolutionärer Zwischenrufer
- Angelo Ferrari as Ein Hauptmann
- Charles Francois as Ein Kellner bei der Soirée
- Illo Gutschwager as Anwesender bei der politischen Versammlung der 'Roten'
- Hermann Meyer-Falkow as Plizist vor dem Ministerium
- Leo Peukert as Kabarett-Direktor
- Walter Schramm-Duncker as Portier im Ministerium
- Achim von Biel as Gast der Soirée im Kulturministerium
- Erika Raphael
- Rudolf Klicks
- Wolfgang Dohnberg
- Fred Köster
- Annie Lorenz
- Martha von Konssatzki

== Bibliography ==
- Bock, Hans-Michael & Bergfelder, Tim. The Concise CineGraph. Encyclopedia of German Cinema. Berghahn Books, 2009.
- Noack, Frank. Veit Harlan: The Life and Work of a Nazi Filmmaker. University Press of Kentucky, 2016.
