= Marriage on the Panke =

Play by the author Wofgang Böttcher

- Written by: Wolfgang Böttcher
- Original language: German
- Genre: Musical comedy

Premiere
- Date premiered: 23 January 1935
- Place premiered: Theater am Schiffbauerdamm

Marriage on the Panke (German: Hochzeit an der Panke) is a play by Wolfgang Böttcher. A musical comedy, it premiered at the Theater am Schiffbauerdamm on 23 January 1935. It marked the directoral debut of actor Veit Harlan. The title refer to the Panke, a small river that runs through the working-class district of Wedding in Berlin. It was popular with audiences, although critics were generally dismissive. The cast included Gerhard Bienert, who makes subtle jokes about Hermann Göring.

== Bibliography ==
- Noack, Frank. Veit Harlan: The Life and Work of a Nazi Filmmaker. University Press of Kentucky, 2016.
