= Vivian Kubrick =

American film composer and director (born 1960)

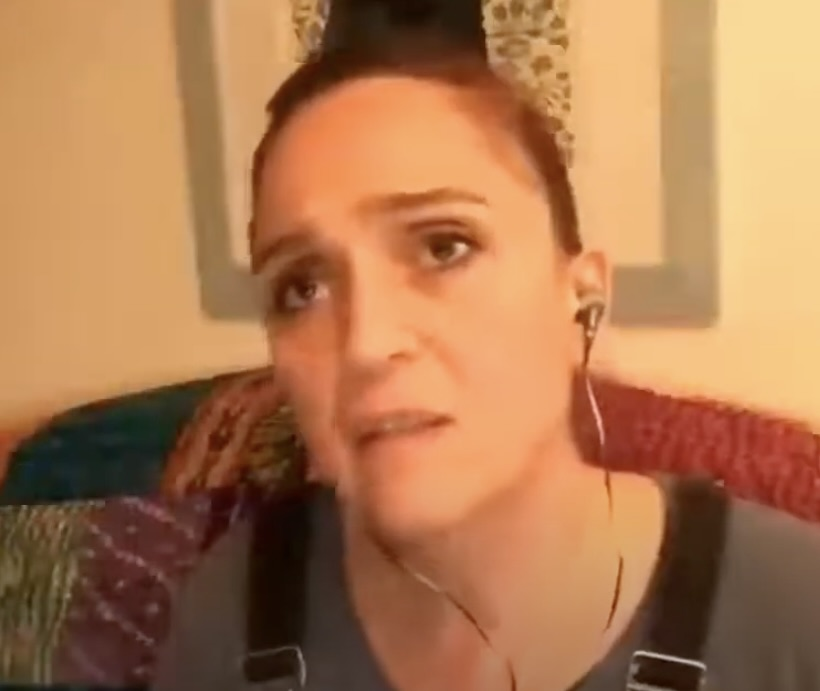
- Kubrick in 2018
- Born: Vivian Vanessa Kubrick; August 5, 1960 (age 66); Los Angeles, California, U.S.
- Other name: Abigail Mead
- Occupations: Composer; filmmaker
- Parents: Stanley Kubrick (father); Christiane Kubrick (mother)
- Relatives: Veit Harlan (great uncle); Peter Harlan (great uncle); Jan Harlan (uncle); Thomas Harlan (first cousin once removed)

Vivian Vanessa Kubrick (born August 5, 1960), also credited under the pseudonym Abigail Mead, is an American film composer and director. She is the youngest daughter of filmmaker Stanley Kubrick and his third wife Christiane.

== Early life ==
Vivian Vanessa Kubrick was born on August 5, 1960, to filmmaker Stanley Kubrick and German-born actress Christiane Kubrick (née Harlan). She had an elder sister, Anya, born April 6, 1959, and an elder half-sister, Katharina, from her mother's first marriage.

== Career ==
Kubrick appears in four of her father's films: as Dr. Floyd's daughter, nicknamed "Squirt", in 2001: A Space Odyssey (1968), as a guest at Bryan's birthday party in Barry Lyndon (1975), as a guest on a ballroom couch in The Shining (1980), and as a news camera operator at the site of a mass grave depicted in Full Metal Jacket (1987).

At age 17, Kubrick directed and filmed a 35-minute documentary for the BBC, The Making of The Shining, which was edited by Gordon Stainforth and had some footage removed by Stanley Kubrick. After the release of the documentary in 1980, it became popular on the Kubrick fan newsgroup alt.movies.kubrick (amk) and was distributed on DVDs of The Shining.

Kubrick supervised and composed the score to Full Metal Jacket, using the pseudonym Abigail Mead. In 1986, she shot footage for a documentary on the making of the film, but it was not completed. Some of the footage was included in the 2001 documentary Stanley Kubrick: A Life in Pictures.

In October 2008, Kubrick attended a 40th anniversary screening of 2001: A Space Odyssey sponsored by the Jules Verne Society, along with actors Keir Dullea, Daniel Richter, and Malcolm McDowell. She accepted the Society's Legendaire Award on behalf of her father.

In 2016, Kubrick published an open letter on Twitter denying the conspiracy theory that suggests her father helped fake the Apollo 11 Moon landing, referring to the allegation as a "grotesque lie". In 2016, she also tweeted an open letter to Dr. Phil, after his famous 2016 interview with Shelley Duvall in which Duvall's mental health symptoms were broadcast live. Kubrick stated, addressing Dr Phil "Your exploitive use of Shelly Duvall is a form of LURID ENTERTAINMENT and is shameful". She started a crowdfunding campaign for Duvall.

In February 2021, Kubrick's social-media activity drew attention for posts expressing support for the far-right Proud Boys and for QAnon, as well as for anti-vaccine and COVID-19 conspiracy claims. The Daily Beast reported that she had shared pro-QAnon material, antisemitic memes, and anti-vaccine content on Twitter; Newsweek subsequently summarized the report and wrote that she had been posting far-right content for months, including pro-QAnon statements, defenses of the Proud Boys, and antisemitic views.

== Personal life ==
In 1995, Kubrick became a Scientologist. In a 2010 interview with The Guardian, her mother said she "lost" her daughter to the religion.

== Filmography ==
Year	Film	Functioned as				Notes
Year	Film	Director	Composer	Actress	Editor	Notes
1968	2001: A Space Odyssey			Yes		Role; as Heywood Floyd's daughter
1975	Barry Lyndon			Yes		Roles; as dancer, banquet guest, magic show spectator
1980	The Shining			Yes		Role; as Ballroom party guest
1980	Making ‘The Shining’	Yes				Documentary
1986	Shooting 'Full Metal Jacket'	Yes			Yes	Documentary
1987	Full Metal Jacket		Yes	Yes		Uncredited role as News Camerawoman; credited as Abigail Mead
1999	The Mao Game		Yes			
1999	Eyes Wide Shut					Score unused in final film
2001	First Kill		Yes			
