= Hilde Körber =

Austrian actress (1906–1969)

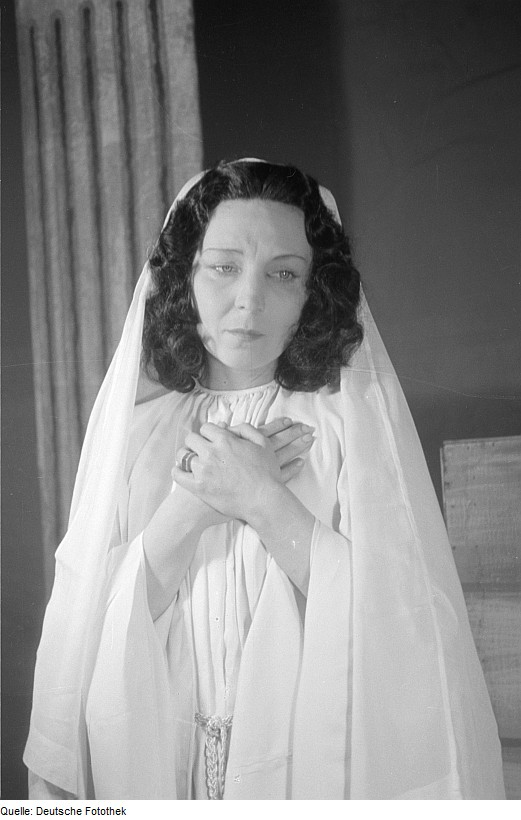
- Born: 3 July 1906; Vienna, Austria-Hungary
- Died: 31 May 1969 (aged 62); West Berlin, West Germany
- Occupation: Actress
- Years active: 1930–1964
- Spouses: Veit Harlan (m. 1929; div. 1938) Walter Varndal (divorced)
- Children: 3, including Thomas Harlan

Hilde Körber (3 July 1906 – 31 May 1969) was an Austrian film actress who worked largely in the German Film Industry. She appeared in 53 films between 1930 and 1964. She was born in Vienna, Austria-Hungary and died in West Berlin, West Germany.

She was the second wife of actor and director Veit Harlan, with whom she had three children including Thomas Harlan.

== Selected filmography ==
- Chasing Fortune (1930)
- Maria the Maid (1936)
- My Son the Minister (1937)
- The Ruler (1937)
- Diamonds (1937)
- The Marriage Swindler (1938)
- Robert Koch (1939)
- Passion (1940)
- The Fox of Glenarvon (1940)
- Jakko (1941)
- The Great King (1942)
- Back Then (1943)
- Via Mala (1945)
- Morituri (1948)
- How Do We Tell Our Children? (1949)
- The Staircase (1950)
- When the Evening Bells Ring (1951)
- Desires (1952)
- Roses Bloom on the Moorland (1952)
- Life Begins at Seventeen (1953)
- Ave Maria (1953)
- Sauerbruch – Das war mein Leben (1954)
- The Confession of Ina Kahr (1954)
- Captain Wronski (1954)
- Island of the Dead (1955)
- Devil in Silk (1956)
- My Father, the Actor (1956)
- I'll Carry You in My Arms (1958)
- The Girl from the Marsh Croft (1958)
