= Hawk Films =

British film production company

- Industry: Film production
- Founded: 1964
- Founder: Stanley Kubrick
- Defunct: 2001
- Headquarters: London, England, United Kingdom
- Products: Motion pictures

Hawk Films (also known as Peregrine Productions, Harrier Films and Stanley Kubrick Productions) was a British film production company formed by American filmmaker Stanley Kubrick to produce his 1964 film Dr. Strangelove. Kubrick continued to use it as a production company for his films A Clockwork Orange (1971), Barry Lyndon (1975), The Shining (1980), and Full Metal Jacket (1987).

Kubrick formed two subsidiaries that were named after birds of prey: Peregrine Productions was involved in the production of Barry Lyndon and The Shining, while Harrier Films was involved in Full Metal Jacket, together with his main production company Stanley Kubrick Productions, which formed to produce 2001: A Space Odyssey (1968) and was also the main production company for Kubrick's final film Eyes Wide Shut (1999), and Steven Spielberg's 2001 film A.I. Artificial Intelligence.

American publicist Roger A. Caras was vice president of Hawk Films from 1965 to 1969, and was involved in the promotion of 2001: A Space Odyssey.
