= Veit Harlan =

German film director and actor (1899–1964)

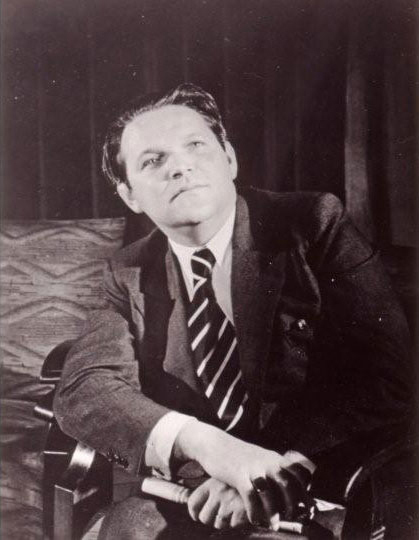
- Harlan in 1939
- Born: 22 September 1899; Berlin, German Empire
- Died: 13 April 1964 (aged 64); Capri, Italy
- Occupations: Film director; actor
- Spouses: Dora Gerson (m. 1922; div. 1924); Hilde Körber (m. 1929; div. 1938); Kristina Söderbaum (m. 1939)
- Children: 5, including Thomas Harlan
- Relatives: Peter Harlan (brother); Christiane Kubrick (niece); Jan Harlan (nephew); Stanley Kubrick (nephew-in-law); Vivian Kubrick (great niece)

Veit Harlan (22 September 1899 – 13 April 1964) was a German film director and actor. Harlan achieved the most influence and recognition of his career as a director in the Nazi era, most notably for his antisemitic film Jud Süß (1940).

== Life and career ==
Harlan was born in Charlottenburg, Berlin, the son of the writer Walter Harlan and his wife Adele, née Boothby. His elder brother Peter was a multi-instrumentalist and musical instrument maker. After studying under Max Reinhardt, he first appeared on the stage in 1915 and, after World War I, worked on the Berlin stage. In 1934 he starred in the Berlin premiere of Eugen Ortner's tragedy Meier Helmbrecht, but it was a critical disaster and he later described it as his lowest point as an actor. Shortly afterwards he directed his first play, the comedy Marriage on the Panke, at the Theater am Schiffbauerdamm.

In 1922 he married Jewish actress and cabaret singer Dora Gerson; the couple divorced in 1924. Gerson was murdered at Auschwitz with her family in February 1943. In 1929, he married Hilde Körber, having three children with her, then divorcing her for political reasons related to the influence of Nazism. One of their children, Thomas Harlan, became a writer and director in his own right. In 1939, Veit Harlan married the Swedish actress Kristina Söderbaum, for whom he wrote several tragic roles that included dramatic suicide scenes, increasing their popularity with the German cinema audience. Harlan had two children with Söderbaum.

=== Nazi era ===
Film critic David Thomson asserts that Harlan, having just started directing in 1935, was able to attract Goebbels' attention only because so much directorial talent had emigrated from Germany after the Nazis had taken power. By 1937, Joseph Goebbels had appointed Harlan as one of his leading propaganda directors. His most notorious film was Jud Süß (1940), made for antisemitic propaganda purposes in Germany and Austria. In 1943 it received UFA's highest awards. Karsten Witte, the film critic, provided a fitting appellation for Harlan calling him "the baroque fascist". Harlan made the Reich's loudest, most colorful and expensive films.

== Postwar ==
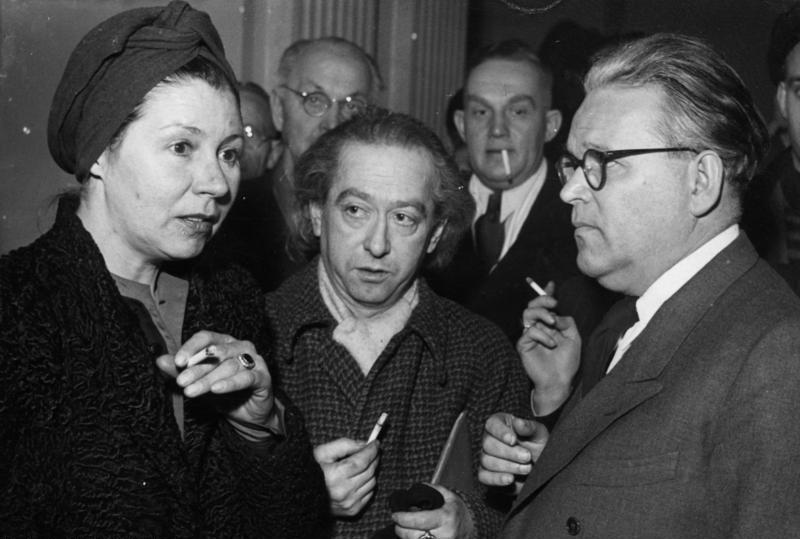
Harlan with the widow of Ferdinand Marian, at Harlan's court case in 1948.

After the war Harlan was charged with participating in the antisemitic movement and aiding the Nazis. He successfully defended himself by arguing that the Nazis controlled his work, that he was obeying their orders, and that he should not be held personally responsible for the content. In 1949, Harlan was charged with crimes against humanity for his role as director of Jud Süß. The Hamburg Criminal Chamber of the Regional Court (Schwurgericht) controversially acquitted Harlan of the charges. This decision was upheld by the court of the British occupation zone. Both acquittals remain controversial to this day since the ruling judge had previously worked as a judge for the Nazi regime and since Harlan's works had been proven to have contributed hugely to spreading the antisemitic sentiment in Germany, which enabled the Holocaust. Nazi camp guards who watched Jud Süß, Jewish survivors told the court, had become crueller towards inmates afterwards, clearly affected by the propaganda contents which made them hate Jews more (although this allegation could not be proved). The film was deemed in one court to be unsuitable and highly problematic and to have contributed to enabling antisemitism and genocide, but neither Harlan nor his antisemitic supporters who insulted Jewish victims in the courts were ever sentenced.

In 1951, Harlan sued for an injunction against Hamburg politician Erich Lüth for publicly calling for a boycott of Unsterbliche Geliebte (Immortal Beloved). The District Court in Hamburg granted Harlan's suit and ordered that Lüth forbear from making such public appeals. However, the lower court decision was overturned in 1958 by the Federal Constitutional Court because it infringed on Lüth's right to freedom of expression (Lüth-Urteil). This was a landmark decision because it clarified the importance of the constitutional civil rights in disputes between individuals.

Harlan made a total of nine films between 1950 and 1958. He died in 1964 while on vacation in Capri.

=== Family ===
Veit Harlan's son Thomas, an author and film director, created a semi-documentary film titled Wundkanal (Wound Passage), in which his father, played by a convicted mass murderer, is forced to undergo a series of brutal interrogations into his war crimes. Thomas Harlan's final publication, issued posthumously, Veit, was a memoir in the form of a letter to his father, continuing the investigation into Veit Harlan's complicity in the Nazi regime.

In 1958, Veit Harlan's niece Christiane Susanne Harlan married filmmaker Stanley Kubrick, who was Jewish. She is credited by her stage name Susanne Christian in Kubrick's Paths of Glory (1957). She said she was ashamed to come from a "family of murderers" but was relieved that Kubrick's Jewish family accepted her despite her ties to Harlan. They remained married until Stanley Kubrick's death in 1999.

Susanne Körber, one of his daughters from his second wife Hilde Körber, converted to Judaism and married the son of Holocaust victims. She committed suicide in 1989.

=== Documentaries ===
In 2001, Horst Königstein made a film titled Jud Süß – Ein Film als Verbrechen? (Jud Süß – A Film as a Crime?).

The documentary Harlan – In the Shadow of Jew Süss (2008) by Felix Moeller explores Harlan's motivations and the post-war reaction of his children and grandchildren to his notoriety.

== Filmography ==
=== Actor ===
- The Master of Nuremberg (1927) as David
- The Trousers (1927) as Mandelstam
- One Plus One Equals Three (1927) as Paul
- The Girl with the Five Zeros (1927) as Ernst Waldt
- Somnambul (1929) as Kurt Bingen
- Hungarian Nights (1929) as Zoltan
- Revolt in the Reformatory (1929) as Kurt
- A Woman Branded (1931) as the student
- Alarm at Midnight (1931) as Otto Weigandt
- The Eleven Schill Officers (1932) as Klaus Gabain
- Frederica (1932) as Duke Karl August von Weimar
- The Invisible Front (1933) as Friseur Jonny
- The Hymn of Leuthen (1933) as Paul the soldier
- Typhoon (1933) as Inose Hironari
- Paganini (1934) as Enrico Tortoni
- A Woman With Power of Attorney (1934) as Schwartzkopf
- The Brenken Case (1934) as the stranger
- My Life for Maria Isabella (1935) as the rebel corporal
- Don't Lose Heart, Suzanne! (1935) as Georg Brinkmann
- The Red Rider (1935) as Andreas
- Joan of Arc (1935) as Pierre
- Stradivari (1935) as Antonio Stradivari
- Stars Over Colombo (1953) as the clown

=== Director ===
- Die Pompadour (1935)
- Trouble Backstairs (1935)
- Kater Lampe (1936)
- Fräulein Veronika (1936)
- Maria the Maid (1936)
- Tired Theodore (1936)
- The Kreutzer Sonata (1937)
- My Son the Minister (1937)
- The Ruler (1937)
- Youth (1938)
- Covered Tracks (1938)
- The Immortal Heart (1939)
- The Journey to Tilsit (1939)
- Jud Süß (1940)
- The Great King (1941)
- Pedro Will Hang (1941)
- Die goldene Stadt (1942)
- Immensee (1943)
- Opfergang (1944)
- Kolberg (1945)
- Immortal Beloved (1950)
- Hanna Amon (1951)
- The Blue Hour (1953)
- Stars Over Colombo (1953)
- The Prisoner of the Maharaja (1954)
- Verrat an Deutschland (1954)
- Different from You and Me
- I'll Carry You in My Arms (1958)
- Liebe kann wie Gift sein (1958)
- Es war die erste Liebe (1958)

=== Screenwriter only ===
- The Puppeteer (1945)
- Eyes of Love (1951)

== See also ==
- List of films made in the Third Reich
- Nazism and cinema
