= Christiane Kubrick =

German actress and painter (born 1932)

- Born: Christiane Susanne Harlan; 10 May 1932 (age 94); Braunschweig, Lower Saxony, Germany
- Occupations: Actress; dancer; painter; singer
- Spouses: Werner Bruhns (m. 1952; div. 1957) Stanley Kubrick (m. 1958; died 1999)
- Children: 3, including Vivian
- Relatives: Jan Harlan (brother); Veit Harlan (uncle); Peter Harlan (uncle); Thomas Harlan (cousin)

Christiane Susanne Kubrick (née Harlan; born 10 May 1932) is a German actress and painter. She was born into a family of opera singers and her uncle was film director Veit Harlan.

She is the widow of filmmaker Stanley Kubrick, to whom she was married from 1958 until his death in 1999. Since then, she has served as a representative of his legacy.

== Life and career ==
Christiane Susanne Harlan was born in Braunschweig, Lower Saxony, Germany, in 1932, the daughter of two opera singers, Ingeborg (née de Freitas) and Fritz Moritz Harlan. She was trained as an actress, but became better known as a painter. Success in her early career as an actress led to her being cast in the film Paths of Glory by Stanley Kubrick, being credited as Susanne Christian.

In the final scene of Paths of Glory, the young woman she plays is forced to sing to a tavern full of rowdy and disillusioned French soldiers. Her rendition in German of the German folk song "Ein treuer Husar" ("The Faithful Hussar") slowly wins the hearts of the crowd of men, who stop their mocking and carousing, and, one by one, begin to hum and sing along, many of them in tears.

She and Kubrick married in 1958, shortly after filming was completed. Their marriage lasted until Kubrick's death in 1999; they had two daughters, including Vivian. Christiane also has a daughter from her first marriage to Werner Bruhns that ended in 1957.

The Kubrick family moved to England in the early 1960s, where Christiane continued to paint and exhibit. She became a highly accomplished and avidly collected artist with a passion for floral settings and still life paintings. Her works were featured in two Stanley Kubrick films. In A Clockwork Orange (1971), a large floral oil painting adorns the living room of "Home", the abode of two of the characters, a reclusive writer, Frank Alexander (Patrick Magee), and his wife (Adrienne Corri), being visible during the "Singin' in the Rain" scene.

Nearly thirty years later, in Eyes Wide Shut (1999), Christiane's vivid paintings adorn nearly every wall of the characters Dr. and Mrs. Harford's (Tom Cruise and Nicole Kidman) Manhattan apartment and a few paintings by her daughter, Katharina, also are shown. More of Christiane's paintings are featured in the billiard room and the upstairs bathroom of the Manhattan mansion of the character Ziegler (Sydney Pollack).

In March 2001, Christiane traveled to the Vatican in Rome to screen a newly remastered version of her late husband's film 2001: A Space Odyssey (1968). The film was shown at the Vatican on the evening of Thursday 1 March under the aegis of the Pontifical Council for Social Communications. In 1996, that council listed the Kubrick film among the most important films of the twentieth century. The screening at the Vatican in 2001 was also attended by Archbishop John Foley, who then was the president of the Pontifical Council for Social Communications.

Christiane's brother, Jan Harlan, was the executive producer for all of Stanley Kubrick's films from Barry Lyndon (1975) onward. Following Kubrick's death in 1999, he became the director of the documentary Stanley Kubrick: A Life in Pictures, in which Christiane took full part, appearing for the interview with her paintings. Although the project was never realized, Stanley Kubrick had considered making a film about their uncle, Veit Harlan, the German filmmaker who made the antisemitic Jud Süß (1940). The two siblings are very active in preservation, exhibit production, and publishing related to Stanley Kubrick's life and work, including the Taschen mega-book The Stanley Kubrick Archives and the touring major museum exhibit.

As of 2018, Kubrick continues to live in England, where she and her daughter hold regular painting courses at their home, Childwickbury Manor, in Hertfordshire.

== Filmography ==
- Love Is Just a Fairytale (1955)
- Paths of Glory (1957) as German singer (credited as Susanne Christian)
