= Jan Harlan =

German and American executive producer (born 1937)

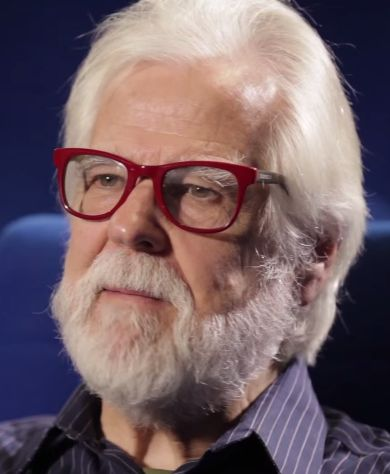
- Jan Harlan at the Dublin International Film Festival in 2015
- Born: 5 May 1937 (age 89); Karlsruhe, Germany
- Occupations: Film producer; film director
- Years active: 1971–present
- Relatives: Christiane Kubrick (sister); Veit Harlan (uncle); Stanley Kubrick (brother-in-law); Vivian Kubrick (niece); Thomas Harlan (cousin); Peter Harlan (uncle)

Jan Harlan (born 5 May 1937) is a German and American executive producer who worked with his brother-in-law, director Stanley Kubrick, on his last five films.

== Life ==
Jan Harlan was born in Karlsruhe in 1937, the son of two opera singers, Fritz Moritz Harlan (1901–1970) and his wife Ingeborg (née de Freitas). Jan Harlan is the nephew of the film director Veit Harlan and the younger brother of Christiane Kubrick, who was married to director Stanley Kubrick from 1958 until his death in 1999.

Harlan started out working for Kubrick as a researcher, most prominently on Napoleon, Kubrick's never-filmed epic about the French military leader. In 1968, Kubrick asked Harlan, as a German speaker, to accompany him to Romania to organise army scenes for the film. Harlan acted as Kubrick's executive producer for Barry Lyndon (1975), The Shining (1980), Full Metal Jacket (1987), and Eyes Wide Shut (1999), and was an assistant to the producer for A Clockwork Orange (1971). Harlan was also executive producer for Steven Spielberg's A.I. Artificial Intelligence (2001), a collaboration between Spielberg and Kubrick. Harlan also directed a feature-length documentary about Kubrick, Stanley Kubrick: A Life in Pictures (2001).

In 2009 he assisted Alison Castle, a Taschen editor, in creating the book Stanley Kubrick's Napoleon: The Greatest Movie Never Made and gave a talk about the Kubrick Napoleon archives at Cambridge Film Festival in September 2010 with her. He is the nephew of the German filmmaker Veit Harlan, best known for his work during the Third Reich including Jud Süß (1940), an antisemitic propaganda film. Jan Harlan has three sons, Manuel, Dominic and Ben. He is married to Maria.

He has for several years been a regular guest lecturer at the European Film College, and also at the University of Hertfordshire's Film and Television degrees, for which he was awarded an Honorary Doctorate in 2011.

In 2016, Harlan joined the film jury for ShortCutz Amsterdam, an annual film festival promoting short films in Amsterdam.

== Filmography ==
=== Producer ===
Year	Title	Director	Notes
1971	A Clockwork Orange	Stanley Kubrick	
1975	Barry Lyndon	Stanley Kubrick	
1980	The Shining	Stanley Kubrick	
1987	Full Metal Jacket	Stanley Kubrick	
1999	Eyes Wide Shut	Stanley Kubrick	
2001	Stanley Kubrick: A Life in Pictures	Self	Documentary
2001	A.I. Artificial Intelligence	Steven Spielberg	
2019	Valley of the Gods	Lech Majewski	
