= Stanley Kubrick: A Life in Pictures =

2001 documentary directed by Jan Harlan

- Directed by: Jan Harlan
- Produced by: Jan Harlan; Anthony (Tony) Frewin (assoc.)
- Narrated by: Tom Cruise
- Cinematography: Manuel Harlan
- Edited by: Melanie Viner Cuneo
- Distributed by: Warner Bros. Pictures
- Release date: 2001
- Running time: 142 minutes
- Country: United States
- Language: English

Stanley Kubrick: A Life in Pictures is a 2001 documentary about the life and work of Stanley Kubrick, famed film director, made by his long-time assistant and brother-in-law Jan Harlan.

== Summary ==
With its running time of 142 minutes long, it consists of several 15-minute chapters, each detailing the making of one of his films – and two more showing his childhood and life.

Jan Harlan got many of Kubrick's collaborators for interviews, including Tom Cruise, Nicole Kidman, Keir Dullea, Arthur C. Clarke, Malcolm McDowell, Peter Ustinov, Jack Nicholson, György Ligeti and Matthew Modine. It also has interviews from film directors who were inspired by Kubrick such as Woody Allen, Steven Spielberg, Martin Scorsese and Sydney Pollack.

The film contains some rare footage, including from the Kubrick family home videos and on film sets, and clips from Fear and Desire - Kubrick's first feature-length film.

== Release ==
It was released on DVD on June 12, 2001, and was featured on the tenth disc of Stanley Kubrick: The Essential Collection and Stanley Kubrick: Limited Edition Collection DVD and Blu-ray released May 31, 2011, respectively. The documentary was also bundled in a box set of some of Kubrick's other films released January 22, 2008.

== Music ==
The soundtrack of the film is by composer and musician Jocelyn Pook, who had previously worked with Kubrick on Eyes Wide Shut (1999).

== Reception ==
On review aggregator website Rotten Tomatoes, the film holds an approval rating of 86% based on 14 reviews, with an average rating of 7.9/10.
