= Thomas Harlan =

German film director and author (1929–2010)

Thomas Christoph Harlan
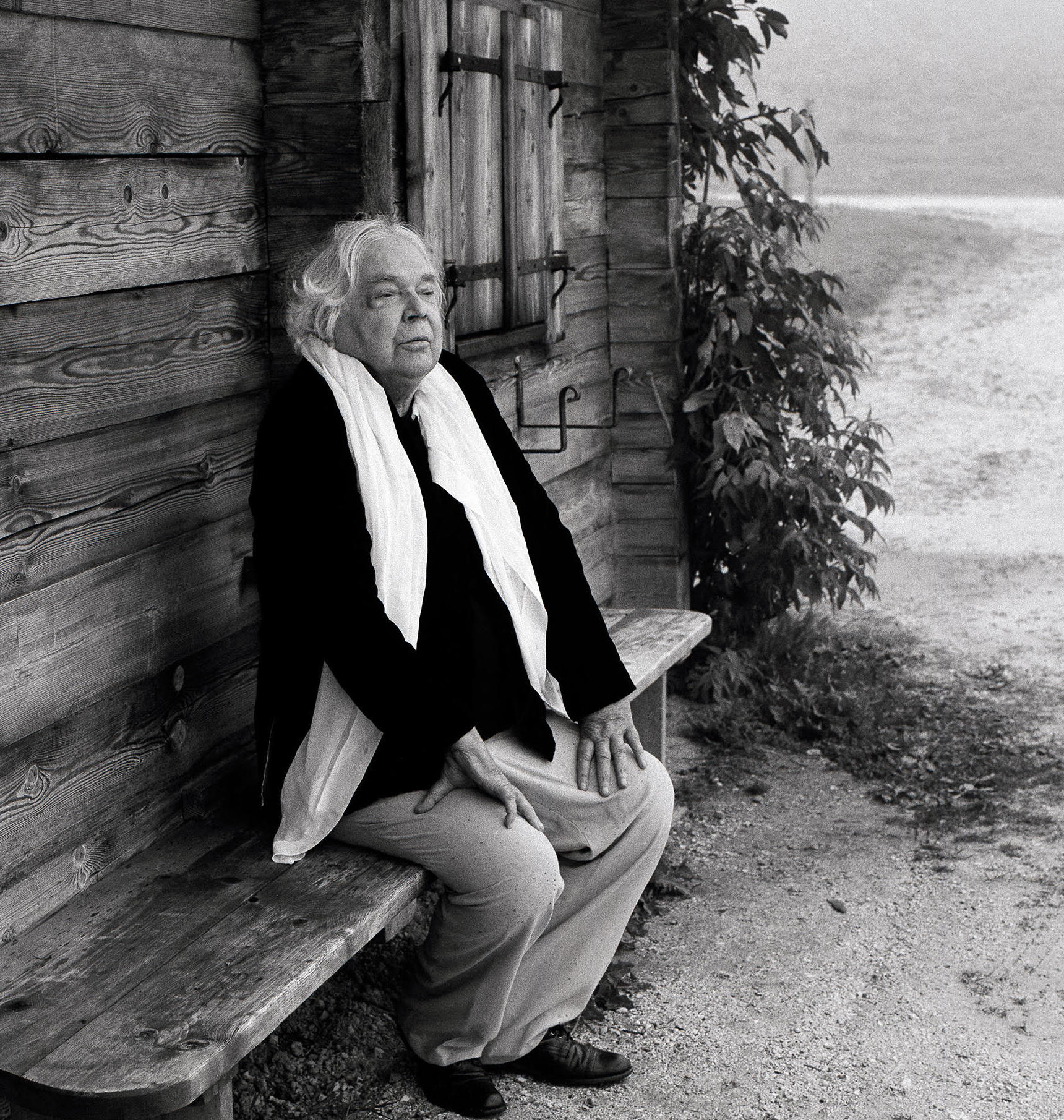
- Harlan in 2007
- Born: 19 February 1929
- Died: 16 October 2010 (aged 81); Berchtesgaden, Germany
- Parents: Veit Harlan (father); Hilde Körber (mother)
- Relatives: Christiane Kubrick (cousin); Jan Harlan (cousin); Stanley Kubrick (cousin-in-law); Vivian Kubrick (first cousin once removed)

Thomas Christoph Harlan (19 February 1929 – 16 October 2010) was a German author and director of French-language films.

== Life and work ==
Harlan was the son of director Veit Harlan and the actress Hilde Körber. He was born and raised in Berlin. Through his father's prominence in the Nazi regime, he met Joseph Goebbels. At eight years old, he was brought along to visit Adolf Hitler. In 1942 the family was evacuated to Zakopane, then to a country estate in Sławno. He returned to Berlin in 1945.

In 1947 he began studying philosophy at the University of Tübingen, where he met Michel Tournier.

In 1948 he moved to Paris after receiving a three-month stipend to study at the Sorbonne in Paris, where he continued his studies in philosophy and mathematics. He also began working for the French radio. He lived with Gilles Deleuze and Michel Tournier, and later Pierre Boulez. He met Armand Gatti and Marc Sabathier-Levêque.

In 1952 he traveled to Israel with Klaus Kinski. The following year he premiered his first play, Bluma, and visited the Soviet Union. In 1955 he wrote his first poems in German. Harlan co-wrote the screenplay Verrat an Deutschland (Betrayal to Germany) with his father, who directed it. The collaboration with his father broke down and his contribution to the screenplay was distorted. In 1958, Harlan founded the Junge Ensemble (Young Company) in Berlin. The premiere of his play Ich selbst und kein Engel -- Chronik aus dem Warschauer Ghetto (I myself and no angel -- A Chronicle from the Warsaw Ghetto) led to a scandal, which the author Hans Habe treats in his novel Christoph und sein Vater (Christopher and his Father).

In 1959 Harlan was the target of a series of libel lawsuits. This included, among others, Ernst Achenbach, a member of the parliament for the Free Democratic Party at the time, and Franz Alfred Six.

Harlan began researching the extermination camps Kulmhof, Sobibór, Bełżec, and Treblinka. He moved to Poland in 1960 and researched the Polish archives until 1964. He brought to light thousands of German war crimes, which contributed to over 2000 criminal proceedings in Germany against war criminals. His work was supported by the Italian publisher Giangiacomo Feltrinelli. He developed a friendship with Fritz Bauer. Harlan also worked on German-language programming for Warsaw radio at this time. In 1963, due to the publication of his research in the national archives, he was placed under house arrest in Poland for one year for breaching state secrets. The following year in Germany, Hans Globke brought a formal complaint against him with the police for treason. The reason was "using the interrogation records of the German justice system in Polish publications." Harlan was not convicted, but was denied a German passport for ten years and was not permitted to enter the Federal Republic of Germany.

Harlan abruptly ended his research in the Polish archives in 1964. A planned book with Feltrinelli about German war criminals never materialized. He became "a rare species of man: an international German revolutionary" (eine seltene Spezies Mensch: ein internationaler deutscher Revolutionär). After his father died, he moved to Italy. He joined the far-left organization Lotta Continua and began literary work, which along with his travels and films, marked the following years.

In 1974 Harlan traveled to Chile, Bolivia, and the United States. He became involved in the Chilean resistance movement against Augusto Pinochet. The following year in Portugal, he became a member of the revolutionary committee during the Carnation Revolution while filming Torre Bela. Between 1978 and 1984, he worked on the film Wundkanal. The American director Robert Kramer documented the process in his own film Notre Nazi. Wundkanal and Notre Nazi premiered at the Venice International Film Festival in 1984 and the Berlin International Film Festival in 1985, leading to renewed scandals.

In 1987 he traveled to the Russian Far East to prepare for his next film project, Katharina XXII, which was never realized. He began translating the book Hiob by Guido Ceronetti into German, studied Creole in Haiti, and worked on the film Souvenance, which premiered in 1990 at the International Film Festival Rotterdam. He made more trips to Russia and wrote the screenplay for Kinematograf, which also was never produced. From 2001 on, Harlan lived in a sanatorium near Berchtesgaden. He married the documentary filmmaker Katrin Seybold. Between 2003 and 2006 he collaborated with Christoph Hübner on the film Wandersplitter.

Harlan published his first novel, Rosa, in 2000, and his second novel, Heldenfriedhof, in 2006, followed by a collection of tales, Die Stadt Ys, in 2007. Andreas Dorschel called Harlan's Heldenfriedhof "a most significant confrontation with National Socialism and its aftermath"; he characterized the novel by a "paradox of chaotic order": "This wild book is constructed with utmost precision."

Harlan died in Berchtesgaden in 2010.

Harlan's final publication was Veit, a memoir in the form of a letter written to his father, in which he investigates the nature of his father's complicity in the Nazi regime. It was issued posthumously.
