= Sally Jane Bruce =

American child performer (born 1948)

- Born: December 2, 1948 (age 77); Los Angeles, California
- Occupations: Actress; School teacher
- Spouse: Peter Woelper (1973–1991) - divorced

Sally Jane Bruce (born December 2, 1948, in Los Angeles, California) is an American former child performer, best known for playing little Pearl Harper in Charles Laughton's 1955 film noir The Night of the Hunter.

== Life and career ==
Sally Jane Bruce was born on December 2, 1948, in Los Angeles; the daughter of country singer Jewell Edwards, who worked with Spade Cooley and his Orchestra.

== The Night of the Hunter ==
Before Charles Laughton cast five-year-old Sally Jane for the role of little Pearl Harper in his thriller classic The Night of the Hunter, she was already considered a veteran of TV, radio, and such films as Kids Will Be Kids (aka Mischief Makers or Best Dog Wins as the working title of the 1954 16-minute short film by Jules White was also known).

According to a United Artists press release, mentioned in Preston Neal Jones' documentary book on the shooting of The Night of the Hunter: "... she got her big break by singing with a full orchestra for a contest sponsored by a Los Angeles newspaper. Winning that competition led to her first role in a Joan Davis comedy, and ultimately to the attention of (producer) Paul Gregory".

Laughton later told Davis Grubb, the original author of the story, that he found little Sally Jane to be "a repulsive, little insensitive pie-faced 'teacher's pet'" — and yet, this was precisely why he cast her as Pearl.

=== The Pretty Fly ===
The Pretty Fly song was sung live and a cappella by Sally Jane while shooting the scene on the river stage, but because of her too fragile voice, tendency to speed up the phrases, and noise of the river, it was replaced by a studio recording made by a professional singer, Betty Benson.

== Post-acting career ==
After The Night of the Hunter, there are no further acting roles of Sally Jane Bruce recorded to date.

Until her retirement, Sally Jane Bruce worked as a grade school teacher and faculty advisor in Santa Maria, California, teaching young children about gardening and the meaning of the environment.

We want to tie the importance of our agricultural heritage here in the Santa Maria Valley … and it's exciting for kids to grow things and harvest them. It teaches them patience.

== Family ==
Sally Jane Bruce married Peter Woelper in 1973 and divorced him in 1991. She now lives in Arroyo Grande, California.

== Sources ==
- Preston Neal Jones, Heaven & Hell To Play With: The Filming of The Night of the Hunter, Limelight Editions, New York, 2002. ISBN 0-87910-974-2 (on the shooting of The Night of the Hunter, 1955)
