= The Night of the Hunter (novel) =

1953 novel by Davis Grubb

- First edition cover
- Author: Davis Grubb
- Language: English
- Publisher: Harper & Brothers
- Publication date: 1953
- Publication place: United States
- Media type: Print (hardcover, paperback)
- Pages: 273
- OCLC: 6151534

The Night of the Hunter is a 1953 thriller novel by American author Davis Grubb. It was a national bestseller and finalist for the 1955 National Book Award, and was adapted for the screen in the critically acclaimed 1955 film directed by Charles Laughton.

Written with Southern Gothic elements, the novel features an itinerant preacher, and serial killer, named Harry Powell who learns that a bank robber hid a large amount of stolen cash before he was arrested. After the robber is hanged, Powell woos his widow and finds that only her two young children know where the money is. Powell marries her, commits uxoricide, and then "hunts" his stepchildren who had promised their late father they would never reveal the money's location.

== Background ==
The novel grew out of a story sketch titled "The Gentleman Friend" that Grubb had worked on in late 1950. In the story, a recently widowed mother named Nellie keeps $5,000 in the household cookie jar. A salesman comes courting for Nellie but her son Jackie is suspicious of his motives. Once Grubb decided to expand "The Gentleman Friend" into a novel, he had the basis of The Night of the Hunter. It was to be his first full-length novel.

The plot also incorporated the true story of serial killer Harry Powers. He was hanged in 1932 for the murders of two widows and three children in Quiet Dell, West Virginia. Because Powers preyed on lonely widows with money, he was termed a "Bluebeard" and the "Lonely Hearts Killer".

== Synopsis ==
The Night of the Hunter takes place in the early 1930s in the depths of the Depression. The location is Cresap's Landing, a tiny West Virginia town along the Ohio River. John Harper (age nine) and his sister Pearl (age four) are being taunted by other children because their father Ben Harper was recently hanged. The time then shifts back to Ben awaiting the death sentence in a Moundsville Prison cell he shares with "Preacher" Harry Powell, who is serving a short stint for a lesser offense. The reader learns that Ben robbed a bank and killed two people in the process. He absconded with $10,000 ($211,707 today) in cash. In a flashback scene, the police (who John refers to as "the blue men") are closing in on Ben. He hides the cash inside Pearl's favorite doll and tells John to never reveal where the money is, and to protect his little sister with his life. In the prison cell, Powell badgers Harper day and night for information about the stolen money, but Harper says nothing before his hanging.

As soon as Powell is released from Moundsville, he heads for Cresap's Landing and starts romancing Harper's widow, Willa. Once he is convinced that she was never told the whereabouts of the cash, he focuses his attention on John and Pearl. He marries the trusting Willa to be able to command her children as their stepfather. One night, after she overhears Powell's violent rage against Pearl ("Where's the money! Tell me, you little bitch, or I'll tear your arm off!"), Willa confronts her husband, who slits her throat and dumps her body in the river. He then becomes even more openly threatening toward the children. John, who has always sensed his stepfather's evil, manages to escape in the night with Pearl (and her doll) into Ben Harper's old skiff, just beyond the grasp of Powell who is chasing them.

They float down the Ohio River, stopping periodically to beg farm families for food. They eventually encounter a kindly older woman, Miz Rachel Cooper, who takes care of stray, homeless children. John and Pearl enjoy a couple months of sanctuary with her before Powell tracks them down. He tells Cooper he is "a loving father come to claim his little lost lambs", but she can tell from John's demeanor that this so-called Preacher is not what he professes to be. She orders him off. He returns after dark and sneaks into her farmhouse. She wounds him with a shotgun and calls the police, who come to arrest Powell for the murder of Willa Harper. The sight of Powell pinned to the ground by "the blue men" reminds John of the trauma of seeing his father arrested. John cannot bear the burden of hiding the stolen money any longer. He runs over and beats the doll against Powell's struggling body, spilling the cash, yelling, "I can't stand it! Here! I don't want it! I don't want it! It's too much! I can't do it! Here! Here!" The ensuing trial rules that Powell must hang for murder. The novel closes with John and Pearl happily spending their first Christmas with Miz Cooper and the other stray children.

== Reception ==
The novel received a laudatory review by Herbert West in The New York Times:

As we read this brilliant novel we live in a world where all human decency is lost through the character of the Preacher, a deadly man with his knife, who sings hymns with fervent gusto, and who prays with a logical kind of Calvinism which justifies his throat-cutting. But human nature is redeemed by old Rachel Cooper, a woman, "like a strong tree—tough and enduring in her strength and good sense, warm and embracing as the river itself." She thwarts the doom that threatens them all, and by her intense and human love saves the children forever from the dark night of the hunter. One comes to the satisfying end of the story with a profound sense of relief, for the author's skill in handling his theme is such that the fate of John, and of Pearl, becomes something of momentous import.

== Editions ==
- Harper & Brothers, 1953. OCLC 6151534
- Dell Publishing, 1955. D149, OCLC 183774
- Dell Publishing, 1963. OCLC 475689957
- Penguin Books, 1977. ISBN 0140044264
- Simon & Schuster, 1988. ISBN 0671652788
- Kensington Publishing, 1992. ISBN 0821736116
- Lightyear Press, 1993. ISBN 0899684319
- Blackmask.com, 2005. ISBN 1596542292
- Penguin Classics, 2023. ISBN 978-0241640425

== Screen and stage adaptations ==
The novel was adapted for the screen in 1955 by Charles Laughton and James Agee. The film has appeared on numerous lists of the greatest films of all time. In 1992, it was added to the National Film Registry. But as one reviewer put it, despite the fact that the acclaimed film "follows the novel's outline almost to the letter", the source novel by Grubb has been largely overlooked.

Grubb facilitated the screen adaptation by composing the novel in a "cinematic" manner. Simon Callow notes how the novel's "vivid, etched visual element – almost as if in cut-out form – is immediately apparent, as well as the swiftly moving succession of scenes." Grubb told Preston Neal Jones, "I had been filming Night of the Hunter in my head as I wrote it".

The novel was adapted for the screen again in 1991 as a television movie with Richard Chamberlain playing the part of Preacher Harry Powell, a role that Robert Mitchum made famous in the 1955 version.

Lyricist-librettist Stephen Cole and composer Claibe Richardson started working on a musical adaptation in the 1990s, releasing a concept album in 1998 through the Fynsworth Alley label. The Night of the Hunter musical premiered at the Willow's Theatre in Concord, California, on September 24, 2004. It was directed and produced by John Bowab, and starred Brian Noonan as Harry Powell, and Lynne Wintersteller as Willa. The show received mixed reviews; it later moved on to the New York Musical Theatre Festival, the last performance being on October 1, 2006.

On October 29, 2023, the City Lit Theater of Chicago presented the world premiere of a Night of the Hunter stage adaptation by Shawna Tucker. It was directed by Brian Pastor, and starred Bryan Breau as Preacher, Jacqui Touchet as John, Kendal Romero as Willa, Mary Margaret McCormack as Pearl, and Shawna Tucker as Miz Cooper.

== See also ==
- Preacher Harry Powell

== Bibliography ==
- Callow, Simon (2000). The Night of the Hunter. BFI Film Classics. BFI (British Film Institute). ISBN 978-0851708225. Although this book is mostly about the 1955 film, the first chapter, "The Novel", gives a detailed assessment of Davis Grubb's work.
- Jones, Preston Neal (2002). Heaven & Hell to Play With: The Filming of The Night of the Hunter. Limelight Editions. In this behind-the-scenes look at the 1955 film, Jones interviewed many of the principals, including Grubb, producer Paul Gregory, cinematographer Stanley Cortez, art director Hilyard Brown, and actors Robert Mitchum, Don Beddoe, and Lillian Gish. He also relied upon interviews with Charles Laughton conducted by others.
