= The Night of the Hunter =

1955 film by Charles Laughton

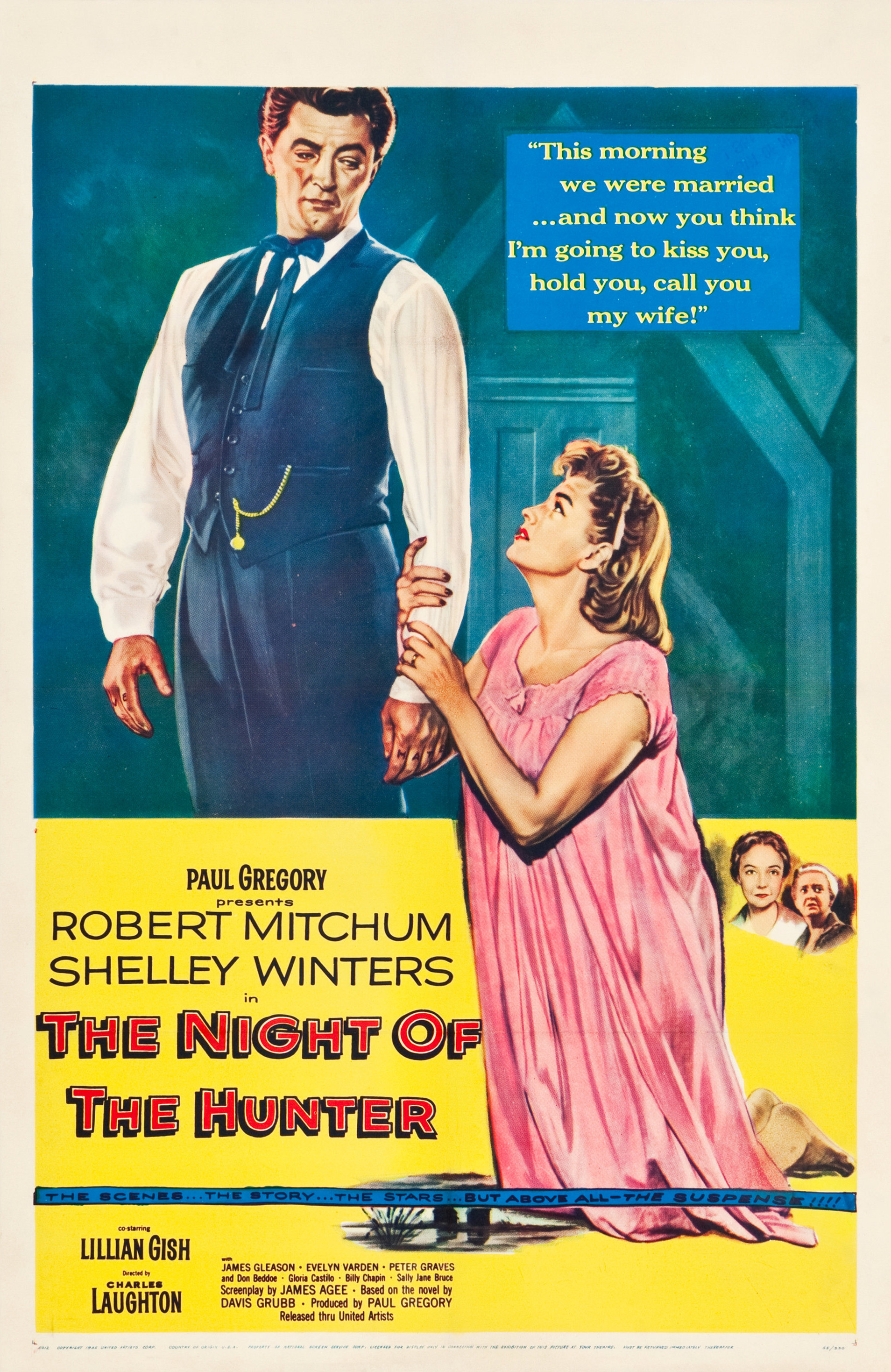
- Theatrical release poster
- Directed by: Charles Laughton
- Screenplay by: James Agee
- Based on: The Night of the Hunter (1953 novel) by Davis Grubb
- Produced by: Paul Gregory
- Starring: Robert Mitchum; Shelley Winters; Lillian Gish; James Gleason; Evelyn Varden; Peter Graves; Don Beddoe; Gloria Castillo; Billy Chapin; Sally Jane Bruce
- Cinematography: Stanley Cortez
- Edited by: Robert Golden
- Music by: Walter Schumann
- Production company: Paul Gregory Productions
- Distributed by: United Artists
- Release date: July 26, 1955
- Running time: 92 minutes
- Country: United States
- Language: English
- Budget: $600,000

The Night of the Hunter is a 1955 American Southern Gothic horror thriller film directed by Charles Laughton in his sole feature film directorial credit, and starring Robert Mitchum, Shelley Winters and Lillian Gish. The screenplay by James Agee is adapted from Davis Grubb's 1953 novel. The plot is about Preacher Harry Powell (Mitchum), a serial killer who poses as a preacher and pursues two children in an attempt to get his hands on $10,000 of stolen cash hidden by their late father.

The novel and film draw on the true story of Harry Powers, who was hanged in 1932 for the murder of two widows and three children in Clarksburg, West Virginia. The film's lyrical and expressionistic style, borrowing techniques from silent film, sets it apart from other Hollywood films of the 1940s and 1950s, and it has influenced such later directors as Rainer Werner Fassbinder, Robert Altman, Spike Lee, Martin Scorsese, the Coen brothers, and Guillermo del Toro.

The Night of the Hunter premiered on July 26, 1955, in Des Moines, Iowa, to negative reviews. It became the only directorial feature of Laughton. Over the years, the film has been positively reevaluated and is considered one of the greatest films ever made. In 1992, it was selected for preservation in the United States National Film Registry by the Library of Congress as being "culturally, historically or aesthetically significant." French film magazine Cahiers du Cinéma selected The Night of the Hunter in 2008 as the second-best film of all time, behind Citizen Kane.

== Plot ==
Harry Powell is a misogynistic serial killer and self-proclaimed preacher traveling along the Ohio River in West Virginia during the Great Depression. He is arrested for driving a stolen car and serves 30 days at Moundsville Penitentiary. There, he shares a cell with Ben Harper, who killed two men in a bank robbery for $10,000. (Note: Approximately $170,000 in 2025 dollars.) Harper made his children, John and Pearl, promise to never reveal where he hid the money. Despite Powell's attempts to worm it out of him, Harper takes the secret to his grave when he is hanged for the murders.

Upon his release from prison, Powell visits Harper's tiny hometown, where he charms the townsfolk and woos Harper's widow, Willa, a waitress for Walter Spoon and his wife, Icey. Overnight, Powell wins the town's trust and weds Willa, but John remains instinctively distrustful of him. Powell suspects that John knows where the money is hidden and threatens him to reveal its location. John accidentally reveals that he and Pearl do know where the money is. After Powell refuses to consummate their marriage, Willa deludes herself that he married her to redeem her soul and begins preaching alongside him in tent revivals. She later loses her faith in him when she overhears Powell threatening Pearl to make her reveal where the money is hidden.

Powell murders Willa and ties her body to a Model T that he sinks in the river, then claims that she left her family for a life of sin when Walter and Icey question her abrupt disappearance. Uncle Birdie, an elderly friend of the family, discovers Willa's body while fishing, but refrains from telling the police for fear that he will be accused of Willa's murder.

Powell threatens the children and learns that the money is hidden inside Pearl's doll. The children escape an enraged Powell and attempt to seek refuge with Birdie, whom they find in a drunken stupor. They use their father's small johnboat to flee down the river and find sanctuary with Rachel Cooper, a tough woman who looks after stray children.

Powell kills a farmer for his horse and eventually tracks them down, but Rachel sees through his deceptions and runs him off her property with a shotgun. He returns after dark. During an all-night standoff, Rachel gives Powell a face full of birdshot. She summons the state police, who arrive and arrest Powell for Willa's murder. John breaks down during Powell's handcuffing, having a flashback of his father's fate. He beats the doll against Powell's struggling body in anguish, spilling the cash.

During Powell's trial, John cannot bring himself to testify against him. After Powell's sentencing, Rachel takes John and the other children away as Icey leads a lynch mob toward the police station. Powell is escorted out the back to safety just in time, but the prison hangman vows to see him again soon. John and Pearl spend their first Christmas together with Rachel and her brood of stray children.

== Cast ==
- Robert Mitchum as Harry Powell
- Shelley Winters as Willa Harper
- Lillian Gish as Rachel Cooper
- James Gleason as Uncle Birdie Steptoe
- Evelyn Varden as Icey Spoon
- Peter Graves as Ben Harper
- Don Beddoe as Walt Spoon
- Billy Chapin as John Harper
- Sally Jane Bruce as Pearl Harper
- Gloria Castillo as Ruby

Uncredited

- Paul Bryar as Bart, the hangman
- Kay Lavelle as Miz Cunningham
- Mary Ellen Clemons as Clary
- Gloria Pall as burlesque showgirl
- Corey Allen and Michael Chapin as boys in town

== Production ==
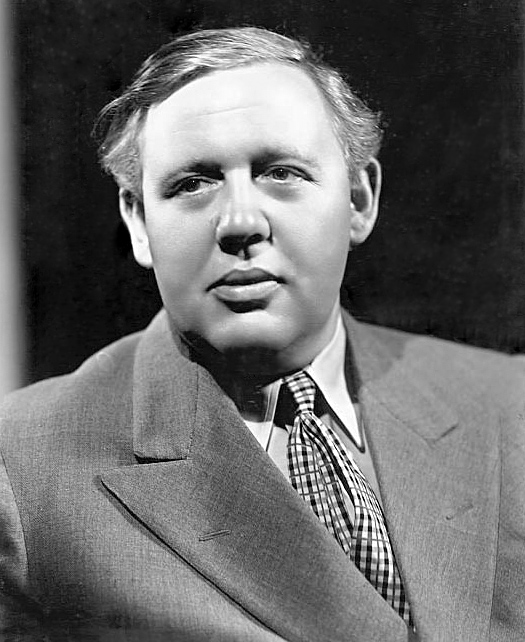
Director Charles Laughton in 1934

This was the only film solely directed by and credited to the actor Charles Laughton. He had previously been an uncredited fill-in director on The Man on the Eiffel Tower (1949), after its original director Irving Allen was removed and before the eventual credited director Burgess Meredith took over. However, Laughton had directed plays on Broadway, most produced by his friend Paul Gregory.

=== Development ===
Harold Matson, a literary agent, sent a copy of the 1953 novel The Night of the Hunter by Davis Grubb to Paul Gregory. Gregory sent the book to Laughton, who loved it and described it as a "nightmarish Mother Goose story". Laughton contacted Grubb, and the two of them instantly got along very well. He traveled to Philadelphia, where Grubb lived, and they spent five days discussing ideas for the film. Grubb had studied art in college, so he offered to draw sketches as a form of inspiration. Laughton loved the drawings, and many of them were used in the film's storyboard. Laughton told Grubb that "Hollywood has been looking for forty years [...] to find a story about the church, what it is and what it does, and you've found a way of doing it that we can put over".

At first, Grubb was being considered to write the screenplay himself, but the studio wanted to hire someone with experience writing for films. James Agee was hired as the screenwriter because he was from the South and had experience writing about the Depression. Agee began writing in April 1954 and finished in June, but his script was 293 pages: much too long for a feature film. Laughton made significant rewrites to the script, and his was the version used for shooting, even though he insisted that Agee be credited as the only writer. Agee's original script ended with a shot of children's faces floating among the stars, an idea that was eventually moved to the opening of the film. Throughout 1954, Gregory worked with the Production Code Administration to change the script to meet the guidelines of the Production Code. There was much concern about depicting a preacher on screen as an evil person, and Gregory made an effort to make the character of the Preacher not appear to be a real, ordained minister. Eventually the script was approved, but Protestant groups who had read the script continued to object to the film's production.

The budget of the film was a little under $600,000, of which about $75,000 was for the rights to adapt the novel.

=== Casting ===
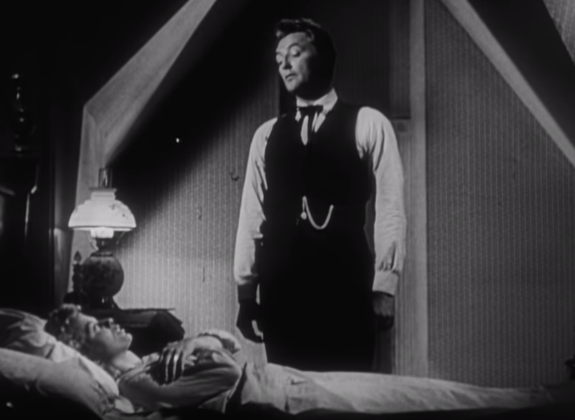
Robert Mitchum (right) as Preacher Harry Powell and Shelley Winters (left) as Willa Harper

Laughton's initial thought after reading the novel was to cast himself in the role of the Preacher, but Gregory convinced him that no studio would finance a film unless they cast someone else. For the most part, he did not hold traditional auditions for the actors; he simply met with them to get a sense of their personalities and whether they were right for the role.

Laughton considered casting Gary Cooper as Harry Powell, but Cooper declined the role as he thought it might be detrimental to his career. John Carradine expressed interest in the Powell role, as did Laurence Olivier, but the latter's schedule was not free for two years. Next, Laughton approached Robert Mitchum: "'I'm directing this film and there's a character in it who is a diabolical shit.' 'Present,' replied Mitchum." Laughton liked Mitchum for the role partly due to his sexual persona, but Grubb was concerned about the character of the Preacher being considered sexual. Laughton told Grubb, "If you want to sell God, you have to be sexy."

Agnes Moorehead, Grace Kelly, and Betty Grable were all considered for the role of Willa Harper. In the end Laughton chose Shelley Winters because he felt she had a vulnerable quality and was more of a serious actor than a movie star; she committed to the role only two weeks before filming began. In her 1989 memoir, Winters described this as "probably the most thoughtful and reserved performance I ever gave".

Laughton's first pick for the role of Rachel Cooper was his wife Elsa Lanchester. Jane Darwell and Louise Fazenda also were considered. Lanchester, for reasons unknown to Laughton, declined the role, suggesting silent movie star Lillian Gish for the role. Laughton had idolized Gish in his youth, but, according to silent film pianist Stuart Oderman, was doubtful about casting her. In preparation for filming, Laughton studied silent films by viewing their original nitrate prints, including The Birth of a Nation and Intolerance, which both featured Gish, and The Four Horsemen of the Apocalypse. He wanted to "restore the power of silent films to talkies." It was after his viewings Laughton decided to cast Gish in the role of Cooper. Gish had gotten word of Laughton watching her old movies; when she asked him why he decided to cast her, Laughton responded that her "unassailable virginity" had moved him: "When I first went to the movies, they sat in their seats straight and leaned forward. Now they slump down, with their heads back, and eat candy and popcorn. I want them to sit up straight again."

=== Filming ===
A lighting arrangement in The Night of the Hunter. Note the placement of the key light off the subject (Lillian Gish) to create a silhouette while illuminating Robert Mitchum in the background. This plays off the conventional association of light with good and darkness with evil.

Principal photography of The Night of the Hunter began on August 15 and ended on October 7, 1954, a total of 36 days of shooting. Laughton kept the editor and musical composer on set during filming, which was very uncommon at the time. Mitchum originally suggested that Laughton shoot the film in authentic Appalachian locations, but there was insufficient budget to do on-location shooting. Laughton created the film's unique look on Hollywood sound stages by filming at the RKO-Pathé Forty Acres lot, Republic Studios, and the Rowland V. Lee ranch in the San Fernando Valley. Certain cutaway shots and compositing shots were filmed in West Virginia. Laughton hired Terry Sanders as second unit director in order to scout and shoot the river scenes because he had recently directed the Academy Award-winning short film A Time Out of War, which mostly took place on a river.

Rather than shooting with traditional takes, Laughton had the crew only slate at the beginning of each reel of film and let the camera roll continuously until the reel ran out. This was so that he could direct the actors without waiting to reset the camera and sound equipment, not unlike the way silent films used to be directed. Shelley Winters told Laughton she had this image of Willa as being "a fly fascinated by a spider, and she very willingly walks into this web". He liked this image and told her to channel that into the performance. Indeed, a stylized spider and web are seen as the children make their way along the riverbank at night fleeing Mitchum. Mitchum's performance in the film has been described as Brechtian acting, which Laughton had extensive experience with. According to Lillian Gish, Laughton was very unsure of himself on set as this was his first time directing a film, and when someone would give him a suggestion he would start talking about fears that his whole vision was wrong. Laughton's directing style was supportive and respectful of the actors' input and several of the actors have said it was among their favorite professional experiences.

The director of photography was Stanley Cortez, who also shot Orson Welles' 1942 film The Magnificent Ambersons. Because Laughton had very little experience working with film, Cortez would visit his house to explain various concepts of camera lenses, camera heights, and what effect each of them gave. Laughton told Cortez that the nitrate prints of the silent movies that he had been watching for research impressed him with how sharp they looked, so he asked Cortez to create that same sharpness for The Night of the Hunter. The studio brought most of the crew from a recent film Black Tuesday because they had worked so well together, and Cortez had experimented with a new black-and-white film Kodak Tri-X on that production, with great results. He chose to shoot certain scenes of this film on Tri-X because it had a sharp contrast that would help fulfill Laughton's vision. The studio however, tried to convince them to shoot on color film instead because they thought it would sell more tickets. Gregory fought to keep it black-and-white: "I could not see this film being in color." The style of the cinematography was split up between the two units: the first unit of the crew shot the scenes in and around the Harpers' home, which were very dark, whereas the second unit shot the scenes traveling along the river, which were designed to look more like images from the children's perspective. One scene in particular that Cortez has spoken about is in the bedroom after Willa has overheard Powell threatening the children. He lit this scene with a halo of light surrounding Willa's head on the pillow, foreshadowing that her death is imminent. Cortez also brought back the Iris shot in one scene, as an homage to silent films.

Laughton drew on the harsh, angular look of German expressionist films of the 1920s, which is especially noticeable in the art direction by Hilyard Brown. Laughton felt that children miss details of their surroundings if they are not focused on them, which is why some set pieces are somewhat abstract and minimal: neon lights that are not attached to a particular store, white picket fences that are not surrounding any house, the barn along the river that looks like a painting, and the "chapel-like" parents' bedroom. The river scenes with the children were all shot on a sound stage. The shot of John looking out of the barn window and seeing Powell's silhouette on the horizon was created using a little person and a miniature horse. The underwater scene showing Willa's dead body was shot in a studio using a mannequin with a custom mask to make it look like Winters.

=== Score ===
The film's score, composed and arranged by Walter Schumann in close association with Laughton, features a combination of nostalgic and expressionistic orchestral passages. The film has two original songs by Schumann, "Lullaby" (sung by Kitty White, whom Schumann discovered in a nightclub) and "Pretty Fly" (originally sung by Sally Jane Bruce as Pearl, but later dubbed by an actress named Betty Benson). A recurring musical device involves the Preacher making his presence known by singing the traditional hymn "Leaning on the Everlasting Arms". RCA Victor was impressed by the score, so in 1955 they released a soundtrack with Schumann's score and Laughton narrating an abridged version of the story, also written by Grubb.

=== Post-production ===
The film's editor, Robert Golden, has said that after he screened the complete film to one of the United Artists studio executives for the first time, the executive told Golden, "It's too arty." The rushes for The Night of the Hunter survived the editing process, having been preserved by Laughton's widow Elsa Lanchester following his death. According to The Guardian in a 2003 article, "The Night of the Hunter is the only classic film of its era for which the original rushes survive".

== Release ==
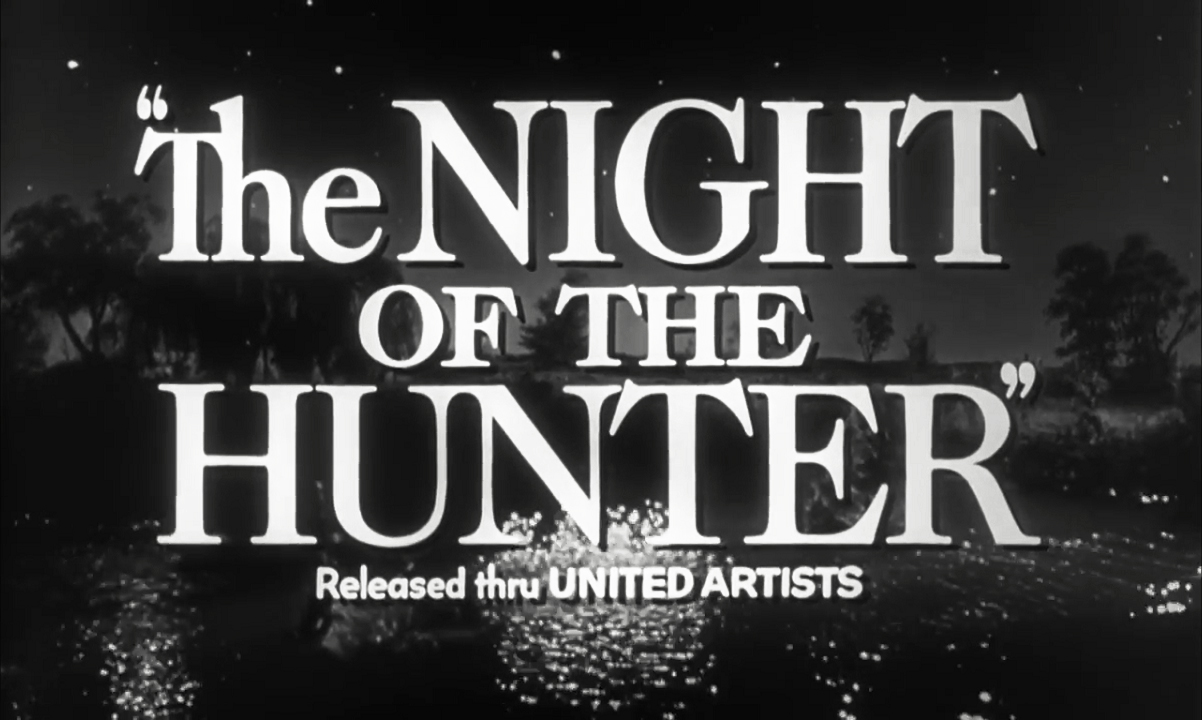
An image from the original trailer for The Night of the Hunter

The Night of the Hunter premiered on July 26, 1955, in Des Moines, Iowa, a special event to raise money for the YMCA in Gregory's hometown, which included a parade and a broadcast on The Tonight Show. It later had its premiere in Los Angeles on August 26, 1955, and in New York on September 29, 1955.

To promote the film, the Los Angeles Herald-Express serialized the film's script throughout April 1955. The film also received an extensive promotional campaign from United Artists, but they were not sure about the best way to promote it because it did not fall into any typical film genres, and the promotional material did not give a good sense of what the film was about. However, one of the film's advertisements won an award for being in the top-fifty best advertisements of 1954 from the American Institute of Graphic Arts. Paul Gregory argued "absolutely no money was spent on promotion" however, claiming "United Artists didn't have the muscle, desire, or intelligence to handle the picture." He originally had the idea to tour the film "road show style", stopping at certain cities that were familiar with Laughton's plays, but he could not convince the studio.

Reverend Alphonsus H. Grannan of the Roman Catholic Diocese of Cheyenne denied the film's release citing suggestive sequences and claiming it "degrad[ed] the dignity of marriage"; Gregory wanted to put together a lawsuit against them, but the studio would not allow it. The Night of the Hunter was banned outright from premiering in Australia due to "blasphemy".

=== Home media ===
The Night of the Hunter was released on DVD by MGM Home Entertainment in 2000. On November 16, 2010, the film was released on Blu-ray and DVD by The Criterion Collection in association with the UCLA. It included various interviews with the cast and crew as supplemental material, along with an appearance of the cast on The Ed Sullivan Show performing a deleted scene from the film. Kino Lorber released a 4K UHD Blu-ray edition of the film on May 30, 2023.

== Reception ==
=== Box office ===
The Night of the Hunter proved to be a box-office bomb upon release. Theatrical runs at establishments such as the Mayfair Theatre in New York ended at "barely okay" returns when it closed in October 1955, as reported by Variety.

Deadline reported in a 2026 retrospective compilation that The Night of the Hunter opened at $6,233 and grossed $12,800 worldwide.

=== Contemporaneous ===
The Night of the Hunter was a failure with both audiences and critics at its initial release. Laughton took the film's failure personally, and despite intending to make an adaptation of Norman Mailer's The Naked and the Dead, he never attempted to make another film.

Bosley Crowther of The New York Times called the film "a weird and intriguing endeavor", adding: "unfortunately the story and the thesis presented by Mr. Grubb had to be carried through by Mr. Laughton to a finish—and it is here that he goes wrong. For the evolution of the melodrama, after the threatened, frightened children flee home, angles off into that allegorical contrast of the forces of Evil and Good." Gene Arneel of Variety summarized: "The relentless terror of Davis Grubb's novel got away from Paul Gregory and Charles Laughton in their translation of Night of the Hunter. This start for Gregory as producer and Laughton as director is rich in promise but the completed product, bewitching at times, loses sustained drive via too many offbeat touches that have a misty effect." Harrison's Reports wrote, "The picture might have some appeal for those who patronize art houses in search of the unusual in movie fare, but the great majority of those who see it will look upon it as a choppily-edited, foggy melodrama peopled with foggy characters." Life summed up the film: "If sometimes it strains too hard at being simple and winds up being pretentious, it still is one of the year's most interesting and provocative films."

The Chicago Tribune wrote: "Insanity, greed, murder and assorted horrors thrown in for the sheer sake of horror make up the unappetizing suspense drama, The Night of the Hunter. Seldom has so much ugliness been put into one movie, some of it dragged in for no apparent reason. The weight of the accumulated brutality breaks down the story's power long before the finish, and an audience is inclined to laugh aloud at lines that are intended to represent spine chilling thrills... [it is] not only overladed with violence, but overacted, overdirected, and overly laden with clammy atmosphere. It moves slowly and unnaturally thru unrealistic settings to a loose, implausible conclusion." The paper subsequently reversed its position in later years, celebrating the film as a "masterpiece of terror" and praising Mitchum’s performance.

The Legion of Decency gave the film a B because it degraded marriage, and the Protestant Motion Picture Council rated it "objectionable", saying that any religious person would be offended by it. The film was also banned in Memphis, Tennessee, by the city's head of censorship, Lloyd Binford. Great Britain rated the film "adults only."

=== Retrospective ===
Over time, The Night of the Hunter has been reassessed and recognized as a classic. It began as a cult film, with a small group of fans, and regularly played at museums and in revival houses. Its popularity grew as a new generation of children were exposed to the film when it played on television. In the 1970s, as the field of film criticism began to expand, many articles were written about the film.

Roger Ebert wrote, "what a compelling, frightening and beautiful film it is! And how well it has survived its period. Many films of the mid-1950s, even the good ones, seem somewhat dated now... [The Night of the Hunter] holds up". Dave Kehr wrote that "Charles Laughton's first and only film as a director is an enduring masterpiece—dark, deep, beautiful, aglow... The source of its style and power is mysterious—it is a film without precedent and without any real equals."

Film critics have noted that the film explores the theme of Christian hypocrisy, highlighting that Laughton was drawn to the script because he was gay and closeted and was critical of religious homophobia and sexual repression. It has been hailed as an example of the Southern Gothic genre, with its themes of corruption of faith and economic depression reflecting the "historical pains of the South".

On Rotten Tomatoes, 93% of 90 critics gave the film a positive review, with an average rating of 9.4/10. The site's critical consensus reads, "Featuring Robert Mitchum's formidable performance as a child-hunting preacher, The Night of the Hunter is a disturbing look at good and evil." Metacritic, which uses a weighted average, assigned the film a score of 97 out of 100, based on 21 critics, indicating "universal acclaim".

In 2015, Taste of Cinema ranked the film 21st among the "30 Great Psychopath Movies That Are Worth Your Time", and GamesRadar+ named Powell one of the "50 Creepiest Movie Psychopaths.

=== Legacy ===
In 1992, the United States Library of Congress deemed The Night of the Hunter to be "culturally, historically, or aesthetically significant", and selected the film for preservation in its National Film Registry. The film was rated No. 90 on Bravo's 100 Scariest Movie Moments. In a 2007 listing of the 100 Most Beautiful Films, Cahiers du cinéma ranked The Night of the Hunter No. 2. It is among the top ten in the BFI list of the 50 films you should see by the age of 14. In 2008, it was ranked as the 71st greatest movie of all time by Empire magazine in its issue of The 500 Greatest Movies of All Time. In 2012, Sight and Sound magazine's decennial "Greatest Films of All Time" poll ranked it as the 63rd greatest film ever made; in 2022, the same poll put it at No. 25.

The American Film Institute placed the film on two of their 100 Years... lists, placing thirty-fourth on 100 Years...100 Thrills and Powell twenty-ninth on 100 Years...100 Heroes & Villains.

Directors Rainer Werner Fassbinder, Robert Altman, Spike Lee, Martin Scorsese, the Coen brothers, and Guillermo del Toro have all cited The Night of the Hunter as an influence on their own work.

Lee homages The Night of the Hunter in his 1989 film Do the Right Thing, where the character Radio Raheem wears knuckle rings reading "love" and "hate" and gives a speech that is a near verbatim copy of Powell's. The Coen brothers have also referenced The Night of the Hunter in several of their films, including 1998's The Big Lebowski ("the Dude abides", an echo of Rachel's closing line "They abide, and they endure") and 2010's True Grit (the visual style of Rooster's night ride with Mattie is similar to that of John and Pearl's river journey, and the score uses the music from "Leaning on the Everlasting Arms").

The Ren & Stimpy Show creator John Kricfalusi has cited The Night of the Hunter as one of his favorite films and incorporated references to it several times within the show, including by emulating Powell's dialogue in the episode "Space Madness".

In 2023, The Libertines released a single titled Night of the Hunter, taking its title from the film which contains several lyrical allusions to its characters and plot.

Night of the Hunter was the favorite film of Austrian writer Monika Helfer.

== Related works ==
In 1974, film archivists Robert Gitt and Anthony Slide retrieved several boxes of photographs, sketches, memos, and letters relating to the film from Laughton's widow Elsa Lanchester for the American Film Institute. Lanchester also gave the Institute over 80,000 feet of rushes and outtakes from the filming. In 1981, this material was sent to the UCLA Film and Television Archive where, for the next 20 years, they were edited into a two-and-half hour documentary that premiered in 2002, at UCLA's Festival of Preservation.

The Night of the Hunter was remade in 1991 as a TV movie starring Richard Chamberlain as Powell. In 2020, it was reported that Universal Pictures was working on a remake of the film set in the present day, to be written by Matt Orton. By 2024, Orton was no longer attached, with C. Robert Cargill being announced as the film's new writer and Scott Derrickson to direct.

== See also ==
- List of American films of 1955
- List of cult films
- Lonely hearts killer
