= Harry Powers =

Dutch-born American serial killer (1892–1932)

Harry F. Powers
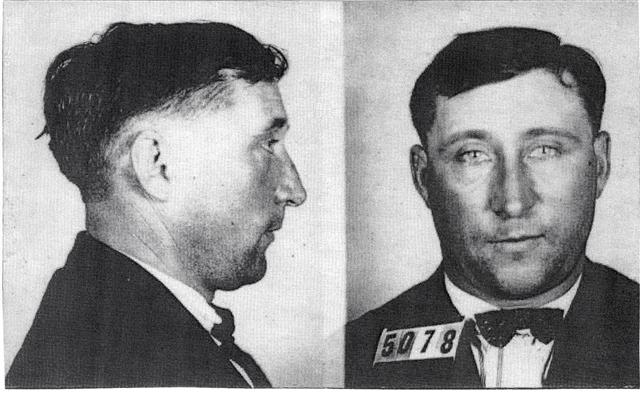
- 1920 mugshot
- Born: Harm (Herman) Drenth; November 17, 1892; Beerta, Groningen, Netherlands
- Died: March 18, 1932 (aged 39); West Virginia Penitentiary, West Virginia, U.S.
- Other names: John Schroeder; Joseph Gildow; Cornelius Orvin Pierson; A.R. Weaver
- Spouse: Luella Strother
- Parent(s): Wilko Drenth; Jantje Woltjer
- Status: Executed by hanging
- Conviction: First degree murder
- Penalty: Death

Details
- Victims: 5+2 not proven
- Span of crimes: June – July 1931 (known)
- Country: United States
- States: West Virginia, possibly others

Harry F. Powers (born Harm Drenth; November 17, 1892 – March 18, 1932) was a Dutch-born American serial killer who was hanged in Moundsville, West Virginia.

Powers lured his victims through "lonely hearts" advertisements, claiming he was looking for love, but ultimately murdering them for their money. Davis Grubb's 1953 novel The Night of the Hunter and its 1955 film adaptation and 1991 TV adaptation were based on these crimes, with Preacher Harry Powell being the character inspired by Powers. Preacher was played by Robert Mitchum in the 1955 film and by Richard Chamberlain in the 1991 TV movie. Jayne Anne Phillips's novel Quiet Dell (2013) examined the Powers case anew. Sergio Aquindo's graphic novel Harry & the helpless children (2012) traces the killer's career and the fascination the case aroused in the press at the time.

== Early life ==
He was born as Harm Drenth in 1892 in Beerta, the Netherlands. He immigrated to the United States in 1910, first living in Cedar Rapids, Iowa, and then moving to West Virginia in 1926.

In 1927, he married Luella Strother, an owner of a farm and grocery store, after responding to her lonely hearts advertisement. Though now married, Powers took out his own lonely hearts advertisements. Many women wrote in response to his advertisement. "Postal records later indicated that replies to Powers' advertisement poured in at a rate of 10 to 20 letters per day." Powers constructed a garage and basement at his home in Quiet Dell; the garage was later discovered to be the scene of the murders, of which he was convicted.

After his 1931 arrest, police investigation using fingerprints and photographs revealed that he had been incarcerated for burglary under his birth name in Barron County, Wisconsin, in 1921 and 1922. Although not charged, Powers was suspected of involvement in the 1928 disappearance of Dudley C. Wade, a carpet sweeper salesman with whom he had once worked, and the unsolved murder of a Jane Doe in Morris, Illinois.

== Murders ==
Using the alias "Cornelius Orvin Pierson", Powers began writing letters to Asta Eicher, a widowed mother of three residing in Park Ridge, Illinois. Powers went to visit Eicher and her children—Greta, Harry, and Annabel—on June 23, 1931, and soon left with Eicher for several days. Elizabeth Abernathy cared for the children until she received a letter saying that "Pierson" was going to come pick up the children to join him and their mother. When he arrived, he sent a child to the bank to withdraw money from Eicher's account. The child returned empty-handed because the signature on the check was forged. Powers and the children then hastily departed. He told neighbors concerned about their disappearance that they were on a trip to Europe.

Some time later, Powers courted Dorothy Pressler Lemke from Northborough, Massachusetts, who was also looking for love through lonely hearts advertisements. He brought her to Iowa to marry her and persuaded her to withdraw $4,000 from her bank account. Lemke did not notice that instead of sending her trunks to Iowa, where Powers claimed to be living, he sent them to the address of "Cornelius O. Pierson" of Fairmont, West Virginia. Asta Eicher, her children, and Dorothy Lemke had disappeared with no explanation.

In August 1931, police began investigating the disappearances of Asta Eicher and her children, beginning with "Pierson", who was discovered emptying Eicher's house. They found love letters, which led them to Quiet Dell, where "Pierson" lived under the name Harry Powers with his wife. Powers was arrested and his house in Quiet Dell was searched. Police found the crime scene in four rooms located under Pierson's garage. Bloody clothing, hair, a burned bankbook and a small bloody footprint of a child were discovered. Citizens of the town began to arrive at the scene to watch the investigation unfold. A 15-year-old bystander informed the sheriff that he had recently helped Powers dig a ditch on his property. The freshly filled-in ditch was then dug up, and the bodies of Asta Eicher, her children, and Dorothy Lemke were uncovered.

Evidence and autopsy results showed that the two girls and their mother had been strangled while the young boy's head was beaten in with a hammer. Lemke was the last victim uncovered; she had also been strangled, with a belt still wrapped around her neck. Love letters were found in the trunk of Powers' automobile. He had written back to many women with the intention of stealing their money and killing them, just as with his most recent victims.

== Trial and execution ==
Shortly following his arrest, Powers received two black eyes and bruising, allegedly from falling down a staircase during his questioning. On September 20, 1931, a lynch mob attempting to take Powers from the jail was dispersed with fire hoses and tear gas. Powers was then moved to the West Virginia State Penitentiary in Moundsville.

Powers' five-day trial was held at a local opera house because of the large number of spectators. Numerous witnesses testified to the evidence in Powers' home, that he had been with the victims and picked up their luggage, and so on; Powers also testified for himself. On December 12, 1931, he was sentenced to death for the murder of Dorothy Lemke. He was hanged on March 18, 1932.

== See also ==
- List of serial killers nicknamed "Bluebeard"
- List of serial killers in the United States
