= AFI's 100 Years...100 Heroes & Villains =

AFI 100 Years... series
- 1998: 100 Movies
- 1999: 100 Stars
- 2000: 100 Laughs
- 2001: 100 Thrills
- 2002: 100 Passions
- 2003: 100 Heroes & Villains
- 2004: 100 Songs
- 2005: 100 Movie Quotes
- 2005: 25 Scores
- 2006: 100 Cheers
- 2006: 25 Musicals
- 2007: 100 Movies (Updated)
- 2008: AFI's 10 Top 10

AFI's 100 Years... 100 Heroes & Villains is a list of the one hundred greatest screen characters (fifty each in the hero and villain categories) as chosen by the American Film Institute in June 2003. It is part of the AFI 100 Years... series. The list was first presented in a CBS special hosted by Arnold Schwarzenegger. The program was nominated for an Emmy Award for Outstanding Nonfiction Special.

== Criteria ==
The jurors were limited to feature-length (at least 60 minutes), narrative, English-language films with significant financial and/or creative backing from the United States. All characters, whether hero or villain, were to "have made a mark on American society in matters of style and substance" and "elicit strong reactions across time, enriching America’s film heritage while continuing to inspire contemporary artists and audiences".

== The list ==
=== Heroes ===
The AFI defines a hero as "a character(s) who prevails in extreme circumstances and dramatizes a sense of morality, courage and purpose. Though they may be ambiguous or flawed, they often sacrifice themselves to show humanity at its best."

Rank	Hero	Sex	Actor(s)	Film	Year	Notes
1	Atticus Finch	Male	Gregory Peck	To Kill a Mockingbird	1962	Based upon Amasa Coleman Lee; received Academy Award
2	Indiana Jones	Male	Harrison Ford (1)	Raiders of the Lost Ark	1981	
3	James Bond	Male	Sean Connery	Dr. No	1962	
4	Rick Blaine	Male	Humphrey Bogart (1)	Casablanca	1942	Nominated for Academy Award
5	Marshal Will Kane	Male	Gary Cooper (1)	High Noon	1952	Received Academy Award
6	Clarice Starling	Female	Jodie Foster	The Silence of the Lambs (1)	1991	Received Academy Award
7	Rocky Balboa	Male	Sylvester Stallone	Rocky	1976	Nominated for Academy Award
8	Ellen Ripley	Female	Sigourney Weaver	Aliens	1986	Nominated for Academy Award
9	George Bailey	Male	James Stewart (1)	It's a Wonderful Life (1)	1946	Nominated for Academy Award
10	T.E. Lawrence	Male	Peter O'Toole	Lawrence of Arabia	1962	Historical figure; nominated for Academy Award
11	Jefferson Smith	Male	James Stewart (2)	Mr. Smith Goes to Washington	1939	Nominated for Academy Award
12	Tom Joad	Male	Henry Fonda (1)	The Grapes of Wrath	1940	Nominated for Academy Award
13	Oskar Schindler	Male	Liam Neeson	Schindler's List (1)	1993	Historical figure; nominated for Academy Award
14	Han Solo	Male	Harrison Ford (2)	Star Wars (1)	1977	
15	Norma Rae Webster	Female	Sally Field	Norma Rae	1979	Based upon southern mill worker Crystal Lee Sutton; received Academy Award
16	Shane	Male	Alan Ladd	Shane	1953	
17	Harry Callahan	Male	Clint Eastwood	Dirty Harry	1971	
18	Robin Hood	Male	Errol Flynn	The Adventures of Robin Hood	1938	
19	Virgil Tibbs	Male	Sidney Poitier	In the Heat of the Night	1967	
20	Butch Cassidy and the Sundance Kid	Male	Paul Newman (1) and Robert Redford (1)	Butch Cassidy and the Sundance Kid	1969	Historical figures
21	Mahatma Gandhi	Male	Ben Kingsley	Gandhi	1982	Historical figure; received Academy Award
22	Spartacus	Male	Kirk Douglas	Spartacus	1960	Historical figure
23	Terry Malloy	Male	Marlon Brando	On the Waterfront	1954	Received Academy Award
24	Thelma Dickinson and Louise Sawyer	Female	Geena Davis and Susan Sarandon	Thelma & Louise	1991	Both nominated for Academy Award
25	Lou Gehrig	Male	Gary Cooper (2)	The Pride of the Yankees	1942	Historical figure; nominated for Academy Award
26	Superman	Male	Christopher Reeve	Superman	1978	
27	Bob Woodward and Carl Bernstein	Male	Robert Redford (2) and Dustin Hoffman	All the President's Men	1976	Historical figures
28	Juror #8 (Davis)	Male	Henry Fonda (2)	12 Angry Men	1957	
29	General George Patton	Male	George C. Scott	Patton	1970	Historical figure; received Academy Award
30	Lucas "Luke" Jackson	Male	Paul Newman (2)	Cool Hand Luke	1967	Nominated for Academy Award
31	Erin Brockovich	Female	Julia Roberts	Erin Brockovich	2000	Historical figure; received Academy Award
32	Philip Marlowe	Male	Humphrey Bogart (2)	The Big Sleep	1946	
33	Marge Gunderson	Female	Frances McDormand	Fargo	1996	Received Academy Award
34	Tarzan	Male	Johnny Weissmuller	Tarzan the Ape Man	1932	
35	Alvin York	Male	Gary Cooper (3)	Sergeant York	1941	Historical figure; received Academy Award
36	Rooster Cogburn	Male	John Wayne	True Grit	1969	Received Academy Award
37	Obi-Wan Kenobi	Male	Alec Guinness	Star Wars (2)	1977	Nominated for Academy Award
38	The Tramp	Male	Charlie Chaplin	City Lights	1931	
39	Lassie	Female	Pal	Lassie Come Home	1943	
40	Frank Serpico	Male	Al Pacino (1)	Serpico	1973	Historical figure; nominated for Academy Award
41	Arthur Chipping	Male	Robert Donat	Goodbye, Mr. Chips	1939	Received Academy Award
42	Father Edward Flanagan	Male	Spencer Tracy	Boys Town	1938	Historical figure; received Academy Award
43	Moses	Male	Charlton Heston	The Ten Commandments	1956	Biblical figure
44	Jimmy "Popeye" Doyle	Male	Gene Hackman	The French Connection	1971	Based upon New York City Police Detective Eddie Egan; received Academy Award
45	Zorro	Male	Tyrone Power	The Mark of Zorro	1940	
46	Batman	Male	Michael Keaton	Batman (1)	1989	
47	Karen Silkwood	Female	Meryl Streep	Silkwood	1983	Historical figure; nominated for Academy Award
48	The Terminator	Male in appearance	Arnold Schwarzenegger (1)	Terminator 2: Judgment Day	1991	Character also appears on Villains list. (Note: Within the films, these are different but physically identical characters, both played by Arnold Schwarzenegger.)
49	Andrew Beckett	Male	Tom Hanks	Philadelphia	1993	Loosely based upon Geoffrey Bowers; received Academy Award for performance
50	General Maximus Decimus Meridius	Male	Russell Crowe	Gladiator	2000	Received Academy Award

=== Villains ===
The AFI defines a Villain as "a character(s) whose wickedness of mind, selfishness of character and will to power are sometimes masked by beauty and nobility, while others may rage unmasked. They can be horribly evil or grandiosely funny but are ultimately tragic."

Rank	Villain	Sex	Actor	Film	Year	Notes
1	Hannibal Lecter	Male	Anthony Hopkins	The Silence of the Lambs (2)	1991	Received Academy Award
2	Norman Bates	Male	Anthony Perkins	Psycho	1960	Loosely based upon Ed Gein
3	Darth Vader	Male	David Prowse (voiced by James Earl Jones)	The Empire Strikes Back	1980	
4	The Wicked Witch of the West	Female	Margaret Hamilton	The Wizard of Oz	1939	
5	Nurse Ratched	Female	Louise Fletcher	One Flew Over the Cuckoo's Nest	1975	Received Academy Award
6	Mr. Potter	Male	Lionel Barrymore	It's a Wonderful Life (2)	1946	
7	Alex Forrest	Female	Glenn Close	Fatal Attraction	1987	Nominated for Academy Award
8	Phyllis Dietrichson	Female	Barbara Stanwyck	Double Indemnity	1944	Nominated for Academy Award
9	Regan MacNeil (as possessed by the demon "Pazuzu")	Female / Demon hybrid	Linda Blair (voiced by Mercedes McCambridge)	The Exorcist	1973	Nominated for Academy Award
10	The Evil Queen	Female	Voice by Lucille La Verne	Snow White and the Seven Dwarfs	1937	
11	Michael Corleone	Male	Al Pacino (2)	The Godfather Part II	1974	Nominated for Academy Award
12	Alex DeLarge	Male	Malcolm McDowell	A Clockwork Orange	1971	
13	HAL 9000	Male sounding	Voice by Douglas Rain	2001: A Space Odyssey	1968	
14	The Alien	Undefined	Bolaji Badejo	Alien	1979	
15	Amon Göth	Male	Ralph Fiennes	Schindler's List (2)	1993	Historical figure; nominated for Academy Award
16	Noah Cross	Male	John Huston	Chinatown	1974	
17	Annie Wilkes	Female	Kathy Bates	Misery	1990	Received Academy Award
18	The Shark	Male	"Bruce" (Note: The shark was portrayed by a mechanical prop, which was nicknamed "Bruce" by the film crew.)	Jaws	1975	
19	Captain Bligh	Male	Charles Laughton	Mutiny on the Bounty	1935	Historical figure; nominated for Academy Award
20	"Man" (Note: Specifically, the hunter who shot and killed Bambi's mother.)	Male	N/A (Note: The character does not speak or appear on screen.)	Bambi	1942	
21	Mrs. Eleanor Iselin	Female	Angela Lansbury	The Manchurian Candidate	1962	Nominated for Academy Award
22	The Terminator	Male in appearance	Arnold Schwarzenegger (2)	The Terminator	1984	Character also appears on Heroes list.
23	Eve Harrington	Female	Anne Baxter	All About Eve	1950	Nominated for Academy Award
24	Gordon Gekko	Male	Michael Douglas	Wall Street	1987	Received Academy Award
25	Jack Torrance	Male	Jack Nicholson (1)	The Shining	1980	
26	Cody Jarrett	Male	James Cagney (1)	White Heat	1949	
27	Martians	Undefined	Various	The War of the Worlds	1953	
28	Max Cady	Male	Robert Mitchum (1)	Cape Fear	1962	
29	Reverend Harry Powell	Male	Robert Mitchum (2)	The Night of the Hunter	1955	Loosely based upon Harry Powers
30	Travis Bickle	Male	Robert De Niro	Taxi Driver	1976	Loosely based upon Arthur Bremer and Lee Harvey Oswald; nominated for Academy Award
31	Mrs. Danvers	Female	Judith Anderson	Rebecca	1940	Nominated for Academy Award
32	Clyde Barrow and Bonnie Parker	Male / Female	Warren Beatty and Faye Dunaway (1)	Bonnie and Clyde	1967	Historical figures; both nominated for Academy Award
33	Count Dracula	Male	Bela Lugosi	Dracula	1931	
34	Dr. Szell	Male	Laurence Olivier	Marathon Man	1976	Nominated for Academy Award
35	J.J. Hunsecker	Male	Burt Lancaster	Sweet Smell of Success	1957	Based upon columnist Walter Winchell
36	Frank Booth	Male	Dennis Hopper	Blue Velvet	1986	
37	Harry Lime	Male	Orson Welles	The Third Man	1949	
38	Caesar Enrico Bandello	Male	Edward G. Robinson	Little Caesar	1931	
39	Cruella De Vil	Female	Voice by Betty Lou Gerson	One Hundred and One Dalmatians	1961	
40	Freddy Krueger	Male	Robert Englund	A Nightmare on Elm Street	1984	
41	Joan Crawford	Female	Faye Dunaway (2)	Mommie Dearest	1981	Historical figure; received Razzie Award
42	Tom Powers	Male	James Cagney (2)	The Public Enemy	1931	
43	Regina Giddens	Female	Bette Davis (1)	The Little Foxes	1941	Nominated for Academy Award
44	Baby Jane Hudson	Female	Bette Davis (2)	What Ever Happened to Baby Jane?	1962	Nominated for Academy Award
45	The Joker	Male	Jack Nicholson (2)	Batman (2)	1989	
46	Hans Gruber	Male	Alan Rickman	Die Hard	1988	
47	Tony Camonte	Male	Paul Muni	Scarface	1932	Loosely based upon Al Capone
48	Roger "Verbal" Kint / Keyser Söze	Male	Kevin Spacey	The Usual Suspects	1995	Received Academy Award
49	Auric Goldfinger	Male	Gert Fröbe (voiced by Michael Collins)	Goldfinger	1964	
50	Detective Alonzo Harris	Male	Denzel Washington	Training Day	2001	Received Academy Award
