= King of Dreams =

King of Dreams may refer to:

- "King of Dreams", a song by Deep Purple from their 1990 album Slaves & Masters
- King of Dreams, a novel in the Majipoor series by Robert Silverberg
- Joseph: King of Dreams, a 2000 DreamWorks direct-to-video animated film based on the Bible
- Dream (character), or King of Dreams, the main character in Neil Gaiman's comic book series The Sandman

== See also ==
- A Dream of Kings (disambiguation)
