= Margaret Martin =

Margaret Martin may refer to:

- Murder of Margaret Martin (1918–1938), in December 1938
- Margaret E. Martin (1912–2012), economist and statistician
- Margaret P. Martin (1915–2012), American statistician
- Margaret Martin (doctor of public health) (born 1954), American doctor and author
- Margaret V. Martin (bodybuilder) (born 1979), American bodybuilder
- Margaret Trevena Martin (1905–2000), British botanist and phycologist
