= A Tree Full of Stars =

1965 novel by Davis Grubb

- First edition (publ. Scribners)
- Author: Davis Grubb
- Language: English
- Publisher: Charles Scribner's Sons
- Publication date: 1965
- OCLC: 1376294
- LC Class: PZ4.G884 Tr

A Tree Full of Stars is a 1965 novel by American author Davis Grubb.

== Story line and development ==
The novel, set in the Great Depression, is the story of the Dance family who keep their Christmas lights on all year round. "It was based on a family, again from Moundsville [West Virginia—Grubb's hometown] who kept their Christmas tree lit all year. Strangely, this enraged some people in the town. The family was finally forced to leave.

== Editions ==
- Charles Scribner's Sons, 1965. This was Grubb's fourth and final novel for Scribner's. His next novel, Shadow of My Brother, would be published by Holt, Rinehart & Winston in 1966
- An abridged version appeared in Ladies Home Journal in December 1965.
