= Preacher Harry Powell =

Fictional character in The Night of the Hunter

Harry Powell is a fictional character and the main antagonist in Davis Grubb's 1953 novel The Night of the Hunter, known as "Preacher". He was portrayed by Robert Mitchum in Charles Laughton's 1955 film adaptation, and by Richard Chamberlain in the 1991 TV movie. Preacher was voted 29th on the American Film Institute's top 50 villains of all time list.

== In the 1953 novel and 1955 film ==
Powell is a self-declared itinerant preacher, who is also a con artist, and serial killer. He has the words "LOVE" tattooed on the knuckles of one hand and "HATE" tattooed on the other, a fact that he explains to his victims by using his hands in a sermon about the eternal struggle between good and evil. He preaches up and down the Ohio River in the late 1920s and early 1930s, gaining the trust of wealthy widows, marrying them and then killing them for their money. Driven by a fanatical hatred of women, he roams the West Virginia and Ohio countryside along the river, leaving a trail of murdered women in his wake, until he is arrested for grand theft auto in Parkersburg and sent to the state prison in Moundsville.

There he meets Ben Harper, who is sentenced to hang for killing two men while robbing a bank of $10,000. However, despite Powell's wheedling questions as to the money's location, Harper takes the secret to the grave. After Harper's execution, Powell leaves prison and heads downriver to Harper's home in Cresap Landing to find the money. He meets Harper's widow, Willa, and her children, John and Pearl, and ingratiates himself into the family by pretending to have been the prison chaplain and a good friend of Ben's; Willa and Pearl are smitten, but John doesn't trust him. Powell learns that the children know where the money is, and marries Willa to have access to them.

After Willa learns the truth about her marriage, Powell kills her and drops her body in the Ohio River. After he threatens to kill John, Pearl reveals the secret: the money is hidden in her doll. The children escape, doll in tow, and ride down the river on their father's old skiff. John and Pearl drift for days until they find a farmhouse near Williamstown run by Rachel Cooper, who takes care of homeless, orphaned, and abandoned children.

However, Powell has followed their trail and comes to the house one day claiming to be the children's father. Rachel is not fooled and pulls a gun on him; he leaves, but vows to return later. After nightfall, the desperate preacher charges into the farmhouse only to be shot by Rachel. Yelping in pain, Powell runs into the barn and is arrested the next morning after Rachel calls the state police in Parkersburg. Harry Powell is tried and convicted for multiple murders, including Willa's, and sentenced to death.

== Real-life inspiration ==
Author Grubb based Harry Powell on Harry Powers, who lived in Quiet Dell, West Virginia (near Clarksburg), and lured several widows and their children there by way of "lonely heart" ads in newspapers. He murdered several of them and was subsequently hanged in 1932 at the state prison in Moundsville.

== In popular culture ==
The Preacher Powell character has become one of cinema's most popular, influential villains. Mitchum's performance has reaped widespread acclaim; he later said Powell was his favorite role. Stephen King has called Powell one of the greatest villains in fiction.

Powell's knuckle tattoo of the words "LOVE" and "HATE" has become one of the most iconic images in film history; it has been referenced and parodied in films ranging from Do the Right Thing and Blazing Saddles to The Rocky Horror Picture Show, as well as television shows such as The Simpsons and Seinfeld and songs by groups such as The Clash, Nick Cave and the Bad Seeds and Coil.

The Ren & Stimpy character Reverend Jack Cheese, who goes around preaching "the gospel of meat," is based on Powell. His knuckle tattoos say "PITY" and "SELF PITY". In the episode "It's a Dog's Life", meanwhile, Stimpy is shown to have the words "Love" and "Hate" tattooed on his upper and lower lip. Ren & Stimpy creator John Kricfalusi has called The Night of the Hunter his favorite film.

The 2010 video game Fallout: New Vegas features a unique set of knuckledusters that incorporate the words, as a reference to Powell's tattoos.

In the Supernatural episode "Form and Void", protagonist Sam Winchester plays part of Powell's speech on love and hate from The Night of the Hunter as part of a trap he sets.

== See also ==
- Lonely hearts killer
- Night of the Hunter (1991)
- The Night of the Hunter (1955)
