= List of killings by law enforcement officers in the United States, October 2025 =

This is a list of people reported killed by non-military law enforcement officers in the United States in October 2025, whether in the line of duty or not, and regardless of reason or method. The listing documents the occurrence of a death, making no implications regarding wrongdoing or justification on the part of the person killed or officer involved. Killings are arranged by date of the incident that caused death. Different death dates, if known, are noted in the description. The table below lists 89 people.

== October 2025 ==
Date	Name (age) of deceased	Race	Location	Description
2025-10-31	Darrius Williams (27)	Black	Atascocita, Texas	After an off-duty Harris County deputy strapped their kid into the child seat, a man approached the vehicle, trying to get in. When the man ignored commands and opened the vehicle's door, in defense, the deputy opened fire, fatally wounding him.
2025-10-31	Jared Andrew Keller (29)	White	Santa Rosa Beach, Florida	Police responded to an armed home invasion that killed one and injured another. The armed suspect reportedly didn't comply and transitioned to a gun before Walton County deputies shot him dead.
2025-10-30	Zachary Ward (28)	Black	Macon, Georgia	A man who reportedly harassed customers at a convenience store was shot dead by a Bibb County deputy after he attacked him with a screwdriver.
2025-10-30	unidentified female	Unknown	Memphis, Tennessee	A Memphis Police officer struck and killed a pedestrian while responding to a call.
2025-10-30	J.A. (13)	Unknown	Cameron, North Carolina	Police found a 68-year-old woman dead during a welfare check in Raeford and determined her 13-year-old grandson killed her. Deputies located the teen in a stolen vehicle near an abandoned mobile home and pursued him. He fled on foot, and deputies shot him after he allegedly charged at them holding a piece of lumber.
2025-10-30	Jack Paleli (46)	Hispanic	Seattle, Washington	SPD responded to a call regarding a man holding an axe in the SoDo neighborhood. Less-lethal means were utilized but unsuccessful. At some point, the man pointed a gun at them before officers opened fire. The footage was released.
2025-10-29	Jose Hernandez (47)	Hispanic	Salt Lake City, Utah	Two officers responded to an assault call and encountered a man holding a rock. An officer shot and killed the man after he threw a rock at police. SLCPD released the footage.
2025-10-29	Vanessa Ragland (36)	Black	Birmingham, Alabama	A Birmingham officer responded to a call regarding a violent male individual at a home. The officer attempted to arrest a woman, causing her daughter Ragland and another woman to try and stop him. Following a struggle, Ragland grabbed the officer's taser, and the officer shot her. BPD released the footage during a press conference.
2025-10-29	Cameron Oberlin (34)	Unknown	Mesa, Arizona	An impaired driver led Mesa Police on a chase which ended after a Grappler device was utilized. The man refused to comply and kept his foot on the accelerator. After less-lethal weapon was deployed on him, he shot a police officer before being officers returned fire. After 30 minutes of standoff, Oberlin turned the gun on himself, according to MPD. The footage was released by police.
2025-10-28	David Dick	White	Southport, Florida	After responding to a disturbance report, A Bay County deputy encountered a man who charged at him with a machete outside a home. The deputy shot and killed him. BCSO released the footage.
2025-10-27	Jose Neftali Martinez-Nolasco (43)	Hispanic	San Jose, California	A man who was armed with a knife barricaded himself following a traffic stop. After a standoff, despite less-lethal efforts, the man charged toward Santa Clara deputies with the knife before they shot him. The footage was released and the deputies' actions were ruled justified by the District Attorney’s Office.
2025-10-27	unidentified male	Unknown	West Point, Mississippi	Sheriff's deputies received reports of an individual having a mental health crisis. Deputies shot and killed the man after he allegedly charged at them holding an unspecified weapon.
2025-10-27	Hosea Rasheed Moore (35)	Black	Denver, Colorado	Police responded to a call of an armed robbery and found a man who had taken two gas station employees hostage. Officers stormed the gas station when they heard shots and killed the gunman in a shootout. One officer and the two store employees were injured. The footage was released by Denver Police.
2025-10-27	Devin Scheurn (37)	White	Belgrade, Montana	Belgrade officers responded to a disturbance report where they engaged in a shootout. The suspect was killed and an officer was injured.
2025-10-27	Diamond Daspin Seltzer (32)	Unknown	Wrightsville, Georgia	A police officer was speaking to a firefighter outside a Sidetrack convenience store when Seltzer approached them with a wakizashi sword and attacked the firefighter, severing his hand. The police officer shot Seltzer. The firefighter's hand was later reattached.
2025-10-27	Frank Mejia Aguilar (20)	Hispanic	Louisville, Kentucky	Louisville officers attempted to aid a gunshot victim following a shooting report. A man approached them with a gun and pointed it at them before they fatally shot him. Police later confirmed Aguilar is the suspect who shot and killed the victim. LMPD released the footage.
2025-10-26	unidentified	Unknown	Fort Atkinson, Wisconsin	Police responded to reports of a domestic disturbance and shot a person who was reportedly armed with a rifle.
2025-10-26	Louivens Ceus (24)	Black	Haines City, Florida	Police pulled over a truck that had no tags. Officers shot and killed Ceus after he allegedly drove towards an officer with the truck.
2025-10-25	unidentified male	Unknown	Fairfield, Texas	During an unrelated welfare check, a pickup truck collided head-on with an FPD officer's patrol unit after veering off an oil field. The officer shot and killed the driver.
2025-10-25	Andre Alvear (26)	White	Acworth, Georgia	During a welfare check, Alvear lunged at Cherokee County deputies with a knife and chased them with it. Both deputies retreated and fired at him.
2025-10-23	Ryver Hendrix Russell (8)	White	Baytown, Texas	A crash involving a Baytown police cruiser left multiple individuals injured, including the officer and four children. Two of whom were pronounced brain dead and died at the hospital, the other two kids are in critical condition. Witness statements, in-car-video and police reports determined the officer had a green light and the right of way. The involving officer, Michael Hightower, who was also injured, was charged with two counts of manslaughter and one count of aggravated assault.
2025-10-23	Jude Dylan Russell (10)	White	Baytown, Texas	A crash involving a Baytown police cruiser left multiple individuals injured, including the officer and four children. Two of whom were pronounced brain dead and died at the hospital, the other two kids are in critical condition. Witness statements, in-car-video and police reports determined the officer had a green light and the right of way. The involving officer, Michael Hightower, who was also injured, was charged with two counts of manslaughter and one count of aggravated assault.
2025-10-23	Joseph Andrade (28)	Black	Charlotte, North Carolina	Police pursued Andrade, who had fatally shot two people and kidnapped a woman. After the suspect crashed, the woman escaped, and police killed Andrade in a shoot-out.
2025-10-23	Michael Bishoff (48)	White	Temple, Texas	Temple officers responded to a report about a suspicious person who was trespassing. When officers found the suspect and attempted to talk to him, he fled. After a chase on the railroad, the suspect turned over and charged at the officer with two pencils, which were mistaken for knives. The officer shot him.
2025-10-22	Andrea Thompson (49)	Unknown	Atkins, Arkansas	ASP troopers performed a PIT maneuver on a speeding suspect who was recklessly driving her vehicle to evade police. She died after being ejected during the crash.
2025-10-22	Robert Norton (90)	White	Findlay, Ohio	Police responded to reports of a shooting at a home. Police shot Norton after he opened the front door holding a BB gun.
2025-10-22	Jason Thai (41)	Unknown	Rosemead, California	LASD deputies responded to reports regarding a man in mental distress and threatened to harm himself at a house. Special enforcement members came after being notified that the man was possibly armed. Eventually, the man exited the house with a rifle before deputies fatally shot him. The community briefing and the phone call between negotiators and Thai was released though the footage of the shooting was not captured.
2025-10-22	Nathan Aaron Peru (31)	White	Tucson, Arizona	Peru was an inmate serving his sentence for child sex crimes and was the suspect of his daughter's death. When he was in hospital for medical treatment, he attacked a female corrections officer before being fatally shot. The aftermath footage was released. The shooting wasn't captured on cameras.
2025-10-21	Timothy Lyle Sheats (47)	White	Atlanta, Georgia	Police tased Sheats, who was reportedly attempting to break into passing cars and refusing to get in the patrol car after they responded to a hit-and-run. Sheats died as a result.
2025-10-21	Tyrell White (40)	Black	Mount Clare, West Virginia	A suspect reportedly fled a traffic stop which led to a pursuit that ended in Harrison County. He presented a firearm during the chase and reportedly made a gesture when he exited the vehicle. Deputies subsequently fatally shot him.
2025-10-21	Teshawn Rogers (27)	Black	Jersey City, New Jersey	An officer approached a man he believed was acting suspiciously and had a bulge consistent with a weapon. When the officer approached, the suspect fired at him. The officer returned fire, killing the man.The footage was released.
2025-10-20	Abdou Rahman Nyan (34)	Black	Goleta, California	Santa Barbara deputies found a suspect who was actively stabbing a victim at a grocery store following a related report. When they attempted to apprehend the suspect, an altercation ensued which caused the police to shoot him.
2025-10-20	unidentified male (32)	Unknown	Parker, Colorado	Police responded to reports of gunshots at a gas station, where they found shell casings and live ammunition in the parking lot. They spoke to an employee, who initially said he witnessed the gunshots, but then allegedly lifted his shirt to reveal a gun tucked in his waistband. Six officers opened fire when the employee allegedly pointed the gun at them.
2025-10-19	Christopher Segovia (19)	Unknown	Indianapolis, Indiana	An off-duty officer with the Community Health Network police department who hasn't been identified as of July 2026 shot four people outside a strip club, one died two days later.
2025-10-19	Rylee James Westmoreland (18)	White	Nesbit, Mississippi	Deputies were dispersing a crowd of teenagers at a home following a noise complaint when several teenagers told them someone was shooting. Deputies located Westmoreland, who was allegedly armed with a handgun, and shot him when he pointed it at them.
2025-10-18	Christian Rosas Arroyo (19)	Hispanic	Goodyear, Arizona	Police pursued Rosas, who was in a stolen vehicle. After the vehicular pursuit ended, Rosas fled on foot, and officers shot him when he allegedly produced a handgun.
2025-10-17	Frankie Navarro (33)	Hispanic	St. Charles County, Missouri	Police responded to a domestic violence report and found a woman and a man whom were fighting. During the fight, the man broke free before reportedly approaching an officer with a knife. The officer shot and killed him.
2025-10-16	Timothy Lehman (51)	White	Wautoma, Wisconsin	Lehman opened fire on Waushara County deputies during a domestic violence investigation. A standoff ensued and gunfire was exchanged. Lehman was found dead after gunshots were heard in the house where he barricaded himself. Later reports indicated that he was likely shot dead by police gunfire.
2025-10-15	Trae Blackbear (32)	Native American	Eagle Point, Oregon	Police received a call regarding that Blackbear was trying to force himself into a woman's apartment. Officers later found him and began questioning him, discovering Blackbear was under an extraditable warrant from California and attempted to arrest him. Blackbear then attacked and injured an officer with a knife, before the officers used an electroshock device and then fatally shot Blackbear after he continued to reach for the knife. Body camera footage was released.
2025-10-15	Matthew Matherson (38)	White	Northport, Alabama	Sheriff's deputies pursued Matherson from Hale County to Tuscaloosa County as Matherson fired at them. The pursuit ended outside an auto parts store, where Matherson allegedly shot at officers before a Tuscaloosa County Sheriff's deputy shot him.
2025-10-15	Odon Paul Bustos (36)	Hispanic	San Antonio, Texas	A man was reportedly taunting two police officers in a hotel parking lot when the officers were alerted to a disturbance call in the area. The man allegedly shouted "I'm not going back to prison" and ran away before firing at officers. The two officers were injured and the suspect was killed in a shoot-out.
2025-10-14	Christopher Chester (55)	White	South Bend, Indiana	Police responded to a stabbing call and were told what apartment the suspect lived in. Police entered the apartment and shot Chester inside after he charged at them with a claw hammer. The footage was released.
2025-10-13	Antuan Odom	Black	Bonifay, Florida	When police were searching a vehicle during a traffic stop, the driver fled the scene. During the search, officers from Department of Corrections deployed K9s and found the man and a bag of drugs he dropped. They shot him for reasons unknown.
2025-10-12	Charles Armour (57)	White	Paris, Missouri	While Ralls County deputies and state troopers were looking for a homicide suspect at a home, they exchanged fire with the homicide suspect, killing him.
2025-10-12	Brad Michael Bailey (41)	White	Warren, Ohio	Police were called to a domestic violence situation where a suspect was reported for threatening others at a home. Police pursued the suspect from Bristol Township to Warren and shot him when he allegedly brandished a gun and approached officers.
2025-10-12	Ta'Shawn Davis (18)	Black	Columbus, Ohio	Two people reported that a man had robbed them at gunpoint in the University District. An officer located Davis, who fled on foot shortly before the officer fatally shot him. A handgun was found next to Ta'Shawn. The police chief did not confirm if it was a real gun, and his family claims it was a BB gun. The footage was released.
2025-10-11	Linton Blackwell (44)	Black	Atlanta, Georgia	An off-duty officer approached Blackwell, who had been involved in an argument at a bar in Buckhead and was walking to his car in the parking lot. After he entered the car, the officer confronted Blackwell and gave him commands in reference to a gun. The officer shot and killed Blackwell.
2025-10-11	Francisco Aviles Barcenas (47)	Hispanic	Phoenix, Arizona	Phoenix Police shot and killed a man who held a weapon to a woman's throat at an apartment building in West Phoenix. The footage was released.
2025-10-10	unidentified male	Unknown	Middletown, New Jersey	An e-bike rider died nine days later after being struck by an Atlantic Highlands police cruiser.
2025-10-10	Juan Pablo Rios Aguilar (32)	Hispanic	Garland, Texas	A police cruiser driven by a Garland officer struck a truck blocking the lane. A pedestrian standing in front of the vehicle was killed.
2025-10-10	Agustin Vazquez Calvillo (50)	Hispanic	Corona, California	A man who was reportedly intoxicated while armed with a gun approached an off-duty Orange County deputy. The man ignored commands to raise his hands and moved the gun from his holster. The deputy subsequently shot him.
2025-10-10	unidentified male	Unknown	Garden City, Colorado	When Greeley officers were chasing a wanted man, the man reportedly brandished a gun before they shot him dead. Less-lethal means were used.
2025-10-09	Arthur Tyrone Mitchell (28)	Black	Youngstown, Ohio	Police were responding to a report of a suspicious man when shots were fired, injuring one officer. Police located Mitchell in a nearby attic and killed him in a shoot-out. The footage was released.
2025-10-09	Philip Adrian Mullin (50)	White	Las Cruces, New Mexico	An LCPD officer responded to a disturbance about an aggressive man at a Chili's restaurant who was making threats. The man, Mullin, approached the first arriving officer with a hammer before being fatally shot. The footage was released.
2025-10-09	Marco Alexander Moore (45)	Unknown	Washington, D.C.	A joint task force attempted to serve a warrant on a man wanted for killing a woman on October 5. A shoot-out broke out, and officers fatally shot the suspect. The footage was released
2025-10-09	Elijah Wilks (26)	Black	Milwaukee, Wisconsin	An off-duty officer and Wilks were involved in a fender bender and an altercation while the officer drove to work. The officer shot Wilks after Wilks pistol-whipped him. The footage was released.
2025-10-08	David Barton Long (77)	Unknown	Rutherfordton, North Carolina	Long, a pedestrian, was struck by a police vehicle in the road. He died of his injuries on October 18.
2025-10-08	Lamar Lorenzo Foy (31)	Black	Antrim Township, Pennsylvania	State troopers pursued a van containing three people suspected of stealing clothes from a store in Chambersburg. After police stopped the van with spike strips, Foy fired at troopers, hitting two, before police shot and killed him. The other two suspects were arrested.
2025-10-08	Bradley Bowyer (72)	White	Queen Creek, Arizona	Police were called to a report of a suicidal man. Officers shot and killed the man, who police said was armed.
2025-10-08	Robert Adams (55)	Unknown	Dundalk, Maryland	Police shot and killed a man during a barricade situation. Witnesses said they heard two shotgun blasts before officers killed the suspect. The footage was released by the attorney general.
2025-10-08	Jeremy Preckel (44)	White	El Mirage, Arizona	El Mirage Police responded to reports of a man acting suspiciously. The suspect, Preckel, approached them with a rifle before one officer shot him. The footage was released.
2025-10-08	Dominique Byrdsong (32)	Black	Grove City, Ohio	Police responded to a burglary call at a house. A tactical response team was deployed after the suspect refused to surrender, then fled on foot across fences and backyards. The suspect shot at officers, wounding one, and officers returned fire, fatally striking him.
2025-10-07	Anthony Michael Dean (34)	White	Piney, Garland County, Arkansas	Garland County Sheriff's Office deputies responded to a call regarding a man acting disorderly and carrying a shovel in Piney. Upon arrival, Dean allegedly approached the deputy aggressively, leading the deputy to discharge his service weapon, fatally striking Dean.
2025-10-07	David Edward Dillon (74)	White	Lakeview, Oregon	Deputies and Oregon State Police troopers went to serve an arrest warrant for Dillon. He was found inside a parked vehicle and reportedly pointed a firearm at an OSP trooper and a Lake County deputy. The deputy fired, killing Dillon.
2025-10-07	Zachary Reed (22)	White	Toledo, Ohio	A caller asked the Toledo Police to remove an armed man out of his apartment and told them the man had an active robbery warrant. When they found Reed, he fled and the chase ended after he crashed his car. He then remained inside. Officers tried to negotiated with him but he eventually pointed a gun at them. The officers shot him. The footage was released in a press conference.
2025-10-07	Shavon Curtis Smith (31)	Unknown	Reidsville, North Carolina	Police responded to a domestic violence call about a man threatening a woman with a gun. Rockingham County deputies shot and killed the man when the reportedly fired at them during the encounter.
2025-10-07	Zachary Groff (35)	White	Tampa, Florida	When Tampa officers arrested a suspected gun theft in the West Tampa area, the handcuffed suspect attempted to flee. Police tased him which caused him to fall. An oncoming car subsequently struck and killed him.
2025-10-06	Latrell' Mikal Ornee Clark (27)	Black	Plaquemine, Louisiana	Deputy Riley and a detective were interrogating a man as part of a sexual assault investigation, whom just had pleaded guilty to domestic violence charges. When they were attempting to arrest him, he grabbed a gun and began firing, killing Deputy Sheriff Charles Riley and critically injuring another detective. One deputy involved returned fire and the suspect is dead.
2025-10-06	Fredrick Payne (52)	Black	Drummonds, Tennessee	Tipton County Police responded to a report about an altercation between two brothers. A foot chase ensued when deputies arrived. For reasons unreported, the situation escalated before a deputy shot and killed Payne.
2025-10-06	Caroline Grace Fabbrini (25)	White	Alsip, Illinois	A woman called the police on herself stating that she had killed an officer and would kill another. When Alsip officers arrived, they chased and fatally shot her when she pointed a replica gun at them. No officers were injured or killed.
2025-10-06	Amanda Allen (43)	White	Gladewater, Texas	During a drug trafficking investigation, according to police, Allen, the suspect, attempted to evade police by ramming their police vehicles. A Gregg County deputy shot her in defense.
2025-10-05	Michael Ray Stice (62)	White	Madisonville, Tennessee	Stice, a man who reportedly fled on foot during a traffic stop after being found unresponsive, was tased and restrained by Monroe County deputies. Police stated that he lost conscious during the struggle and later died.
2025-10-05	David Edward Browne (29)	White	Martinsburg, West Virginia	Browne, a previously missing person, was found naked while attacking the victim's vehicle with a hatchet. He then fled, went back home, and kept destroying properties. Berkeley County deputies approached and shot him when he attacked them with a hatchet.
2025-10-05	unidentified juvenile	Unknown	El Centro, California	A stolen vehicle investigation resulted in an officer-involved shooting at a restaurant parking lot after the suspect accelerated toward two officers. The underage suspect was killed. Two other suspects are in custody. ECPD released the footage.
2025-10-05	Jonathan James Pearce Jr. (34)	White	Grant Township, Indiana County, Pennsylvania	State troopers received a report that Pearce Jr. had fought with his neighbor, rammed the victim’s vehicle, and opened fire on the neighbor and three other people. Upon arrival, a standoff ensued before Pearce Jr. set his house on fire and reportedly fired at police on the roof. Troopers subsequently shot and killed him.
2025-10-05	Eric Ton (42)	Asian	Pinellas Park, Florida	Pinellas County deputies went to a short-term rental for a man who refused to leave. During the encounter, the man attacked them with a knife. Despite less lethal efforts, the man slashed an officer before they shot him dead.
2025-10-05	Royston Bacchus Jr. (28)	Black	New York City, New York	NYPD officers were chasing an armed harassment suspect in Brooklyn. One shot him in the chest when he refused to drop his revolver. NYPD released the footage.
2025-10-05	unidentified male (29)	Hispanic	Houston, Texas	HPD officers went to the scene after responding to a report of someone firing in the backyard. The suspect reportedly ignored commands and engaged with them before two officers fatally shot him.
2025-10-04	Gary Ray Ashford (48)	White	Alexandria, Tennessee	DeKalb County deputies attempted to serve a court-ordered warrant at Ashford's residence. During the encounter, he reportedly produced a weapon and advanced toward the deputies. Officers opened fire, fatally striking him.
2025-10-02	Dalyn Elder (20)	Black	Augusta, Georgia	During a search for robbery suspects, Elder, a wanted man unrelated to the robbery, shot a Richmond County deputy with a stolen gun as he fled. The deputy then returned fire. Elder died at a hospital in November, 2025. The robbery suspects were later arrested.
2025-10-02	Joshua Caleb Hunt (25)	White	St. Pauls, North Carolina	Robeson County deputies, assisted by SBI and federal agencies, were executing a search warrant when Hunt exited a camper with a rifle and fired at officers. Officers returned fire, and Hunt retreated back into the camper. After unsuccessful negotiations, tear gas was deployed, and Hunt was found deceased inside. Another individual was taken into custody on multiple charges.
2025-10-02	Denny Winslow (49)	White	Manteo, North Carolina	MPD responded to a criminal activity in progress call on Roanoke Island, where they confronted an armed suspect. An officer shot the woman when she moved toward them with a knife.
2025-10-02	Victor Conrad Altamirano (58)	Hispanic	Phoenix, Arizona	Phoenix Police officers responded to a report about an armed suicidal subject after noticing that his parents passed away. Upon arrival, Altamirano reportedly charged at officers with a knife before they fatally shot him with bullet rounds and less-lethal projectiles.
2025-10-02	Chris Liem Huynh (44)	Asian	Galveston, Texas	Police attempted to stop a driver for a traffic violation in Hitchcock but he fled to the entrance of Seawolf Park, where he exited his car. He reportedly fired shots and pointed his gun at officers before they shot and killed him.
2025-10-02	Sonny Siofele (50)	Pacific Islander	Honolulu, Hawaii	HPD officers shot a man who pointed a gun at them after responding to a report of an armed suicidal subject.
2025-10-02	Wendell Samuel Chisolm (49)	Black	Sumter, South Carolina	When Sumter County deputies attempted a traffic stop on a suspect, who stabbed his victim and stole her gun and car, the suspect then tried flee and fired at them during the pursuit through counties. They fired back, killing him. The dash cam footage was released.
2025-10-01	Marco Antonio Peña Morales (30)	Hispanic	Franklin, Indiana	IMPD officers pursued an assault suspect from Indianapolis to outside Franklin. On the highway, an officer performed a PIT maneuver on Morales's truck, causing him to crash. He was declared dead at the scene. The county coroner reportedly found an explosive in Morales's clothes.
2025-10-01	Richard Williams (65)	Black	Highland, California	Williams reportedly robbed a Walmart with a knife. When San Bernardino officers confronted him outside, he reportedly dropped the stolen merchandise before trying to get in a woman's car while armed. Officers then shot him.
2025-10-01	David Allen Rawson (62)	Unknown	Yukon, Oklahoma	Rawson, who was suspected of impersonating a police officer, was fatally shot by a Yukon police officer at an apartment complex after reportedly drawing a gun during a conversation with the officer.

== See also ==
- Death in custody § United States
- Henry A. Wallace Police Crime Public Database
- List of cases of police brutality
- List of countries with annual rates and counts for killings by law enforcement officers
- List of law enforcement officers killed in the line of duty in the United States
- List of law enforcement officers convicted for an on-duty killing in the United States
- List of shootings by US immigration agents
- List of police reforms related to the George Floyd protests
- List of unarmed African Americans killed by law enforcement officers in the United States
- Lists of killings by law enforcement officers
- Police brutality in the United States
- Police misconduct § United States
- Police riot § United States
- Police use of deadly force in the United States
