= The Voices of Glory =

- First edition (publ. Scribners)
- Author: Davis Grubb
- Language: English
- Publisher: Charles Scribner's Sons
- Publication date: 1962
- OCLC: 1375825
- LC Class: PZ4.G884 Vo

The Voices of Glory is a 1962 novel by American author Davis Grubb.

== Story line and development ==
The novel is a collection of twenty-eight short stories concerning Marcy Cresap, a social worker and reformer in the town of Glory, West Virginia. Each chapter features different characters who reveal information about her and the town.

== Based on ==
The plot was based on the labor activism of Mother Jones, and Grubb's mother's social and public health work.

== Editions ==
- Charles Scribner's Sons, 1962. This was Grubb's third novel for Scribner's.

== Reviews ==
Louis Grubb, in his preface to You Never Believe Me, quotes Orville Prescott's review of the novel in The New York Times: Davis Grubb's novel The Voices of Glory is an overwhelming novel, overwhelming with torrential eloquence, with tempestuous emotion, with drama, melodrama, and pathos. There hasn't been anything like Voices of Glory ever.

Time Magazine, in an unsigned review of October 19, 1962, stated: "The immense force of Grubb's writing is flung against enemies long since weakened or dead—boosterism, Babbittry, ignorant refusal to vaccinate schoolchildren. He might as well have written a passionate parable in favor of rural electrification. The Voices of Glory, which should have been a great book, suffers irreparably from too villainous villains, too pure heroes, and a heroine who, if she were to carry that serum through one more mile of waist-deep snow, would surely prompt the reader to burn all his Christmas seals."

"A later novel, The Voices of Glory (1962), is one of Grubb's most ambitious works and most clearly demonstrates the concern for social justice that he learned from his mother. The novel describes the trial of Mary Cresap, a US Department of Public Health nurse who attempts to supply the poor with free tuberculosis vaccinations during the Depression. What makes The Voices of Glory stand out is its narrative style -- Grubb allows the "voices" of twenty-eight individuals, living and dead, touched by Cresap's life to speak, and to tell their own stories. Critics were quick to compare the work to Sherwood Anderson's Winesburg, Ohio and Edgar Lee Master's Spoon River Anthology, to whom Grubb clearly owed a debt, and to praise its sense of town and community. But the critics also commented that the work was too long, that Grubb's prose was overdone, and the characters were too simple—too easily seen as "good" or "evil." Still, many believe that The Voices of Glory is one of Grubb's best works, and one that deserves more attention than it has received."
