= A Dream of Kings =

A Dream of Kings may refer to:

- A Dream of Kings (film), a 1969 drama film directed by Daniel Mann
- A Dream of Kings (novel), 1955, by American author Davis Grubb
