= Quiet Dell School =

Historic school building in West Virginia, United States

- U.S. National Register of Historic Places
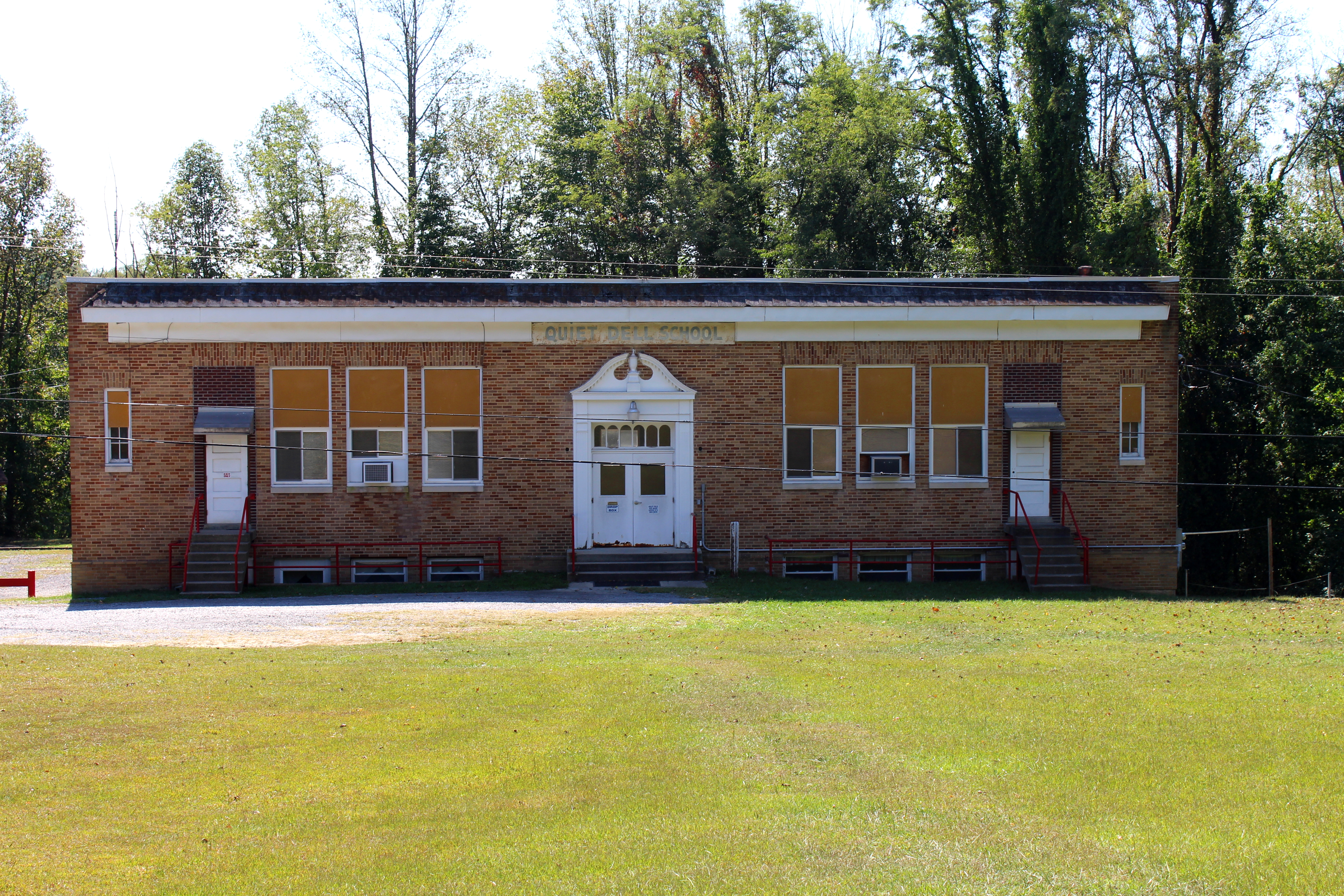

- Location within West Virginia Location within the United States
- Location: Off WV 20 on County Route 20/79, Quiet Dell, near Mount Clare, West Virginia
- Coordinates: 39°13′26″N 80°18′0″W
- Area: 0.8 acres (0.32 ha)
- Built: 1922
- NRHP reference No.: 01000265
- Added to NRHP: March 12, 2001

Quiet Dell School, also known as West Virginia Mountain Products, Inc. Cooperative, is a historic school building located at Quiet Dell, near Mount Clare, Harrison County, West Virginia. The original section was built in 1922, with an addition completed in 1953. It is a wood frame, drop sided building with a hipped and gable roof. It was used as a school until 1970, after which it was occupied by Board of Education offices, a local kindergarten, and special needs classes until 1990. It was later occupied by the West Virginia Mountain Products, Inc. Cooperative.

It was listed on the National Register of Historic Places in 2001.
