= Night of the Hunter (1991 film) =

1991 television film

- Genre: Thriller
- Based on: The Night of the Hunter by Davis Grubb
- Screenplay by: Edmond Stevens
- Directed by: David Greene
- Starring: Richard Chamberlain; Diana Scarwid; Burgess Meredith
- Country of origin: United States
- Original language: English

Production
- Executive producer: Diana Kerew
- Cinematography: Ron Orieux
- Editor: Skip Schoolnik
- Running time: 90 minutes

Original release
- Network: ABC
- Release: May 5, 1991

Night of the Hunter is a 1991 American television film directed by David Greene starring Richard Chamberlain as a self-styled preacher who is a psychotic serial killer pursuing two children for $50,000 in money stolen by their father after marrying and murdering their widowed mother (Diana Scarwid).

Night of the Hunter is based on Davis Grubb's 1953 novel. Unlike the 1955 version, a film noir directed by Charles Laughton that starred Robert Mitchum as Preacher Harry Powell, the 1991 version is not set during The Great Depression, as is the novel, but in contemporary times. Although contemporary news coverage at the time of the 1991 version's broadcast convey claims by those involved with the production that this version was closer to Grubb's novel than was the 1955 film, it actually takes liberties with Grubb's narrative, unlike Laughton's version, which stuck closely to the original source.

== Cast ==
- Richard Chamberlain as Harry Powell
- Diana Scarwid as Willa Harper
- Burgess Meredith as Birdy
- Reid Binion as John Harper
- Amy Bebout as Pearl Harper
- Ray McKinnon as Ben Harper
- Mary Nell Santacroce as Mrs. Icey Spoon
- Ed Grady as Mr. Walt Spoon

== Reception ==
The 1991 televised version of The Night of the Hunter got mixed reviews by critics. Michael Hill, in a contemporary review in the Baltimore Sun, wrote: "It has its flaws. Burgess Meredith's character of an aging river rat seems superfluous, perhaps indicating something ended up on the cutting room floor. And the final chase sequence lacks the punch the rest of the film has set you up for. But it's a well-made, nicely directed, finely acted movie." The San Francisco Examiner's Joyce Millman thought it was a poorly done remake, with the only standout being Chamberlain's "mesmerizing" performance. In The Day, Ron Miller concluded that the remake will probably not appeal to fans of the original 1955 film, but noted the remake offers "worthwhile compensation".

A generation later, Turner Classic Movies' biography of Richard Chamberlain says that the 1980's "King of the Miniseries", as he aged and transitioned into the new decade of the 1990s "...was very effective as the father of a robbery victim in Aftermath: A Test of Love (CBS, 1991), but less so as the psychotic preacher made famous by Robert Mitchum in an ill-advised remake of Night of the Hunter (ABC, 1991)".
