= Denis Gorbunov =

Russian serial killer (1977–2006)

- Born: Denis Alekseevich Gorbunov; 28 July 1977; Chelyabinsk, Chelyabinsk Oblast, Russian SFSR, Soviet Union
- Died: 26 March 2006 (aged 28); SIZO-1, Chelyabinsk, Chelyabinsk Oblast, Russia
- Cause of death: Suicide by hanging
- Other name: "The Ad Killer"
- Convictions: Murder; Robbery; Theft; Assault; Drug possession
- Penalty: Life imprisonment (murders); 8 years (other convictions)

Details
- Victims: 5
- Span of crimes: 2004–2005
- Country: Russia
- State: Chelyabinsk
- Date apprehended: 27 May 2005

Denis Alekseevich Gorbunov (Russian: Денис Алексеевич Горбунов; 28 July 1977 – 26 March 2006), known as The Ad Killer (Russian: Убийца по объявлению), was a Russian serial killer who murdered five women during robberies in Chelyabinsk from December 2004 to May 2005. Convicted and sentenced to life imprisonment for his crimes, he killed himself two days after his conviction.

== Early life ==
Little is known about Gorbunov's early life, other than the fact that he was born in Chelyabinsk on 28 July 1977. In the early 1990s, due to the social and economic turmoil brought on by the dissolution of the Soviet Union, the Gorbunov family experienced financial struggles. By the mid-1990s, Gorbunov lost all interest in pursuing an education and turned to a life of crime, developing a drug addiction in the process. During the remainder of the 1990s, he would be repeatedly arrested on charges of theft, assault, robbery and drug possession. For one of these convictions, he was found guilty and trial and sentenced to 8 years imprisonment.

In early 2004, Gorbunov was granted parole and released, whereupon he returned to Chelyabinsk. As he was a convicted felon, he struggled to find a decent job and resorted to doing low-skilled labour and odd jobs. By mid-2004, he resumed his drug habits, and due to the financial difficulties that brought on, he decided to start robbing people. Not long after, he started murdering his victims.

== Murders, investigation, and arrest ==
As victims, Gorbunov chose women aged 21 to 27, whom he contacted through newspaper advertisements in Iz Ruk v Ruki and Tumba. Posing as a buyer, he arranged meetings with the victims either in one of the local parks or at their apartments, where he would then attack them if there were no witnesses around. Gorbunov would either strangle his victims with a rope or stab them numerous times with a knife - one of his victims was reportedly stabbed 96 times. After killing the victim, he would steal money, jewellery, cell phones and other valuables, which he would then exchange or sell for drugs.

During the course of the investigation, authorities quickly established that the perpetrator introduced himself as a potential buyer to the victims, most of whom posted advertisements for the sale of wedding dresses. In addition to a dedicated task force, the investigation was aided by local police and other divisions of the Department of Internal Affairs. Eventually, law enforcement officials decided to post fake advertisements in order to lure the killer, and on 17 May 2005, Gorbunov was arrested when he met and attempted to attack an undercover police officer.

After his arrest, the officers seized a bag from Gorbunov, in which they found an issue of Tumba, a knife, a rope and payphone cards. He was then brought to the police station, where Gorbunov soon confessed to the murders and described them in detail. In total, he admitted to 8 robberies, five of which were fatal.

== Trial and suicide ==
The trial began in early 2006. On 22 March 2006, the Chelyabinsk Regional Court found him guilty on all charges and sentenced Gorbunov to life imprisonment. Only two days later, Gorbunov was found dead in his cell at SIZO-1, having hanged himself with a sheet tied to the cell's window bars. He left behind a suicide note, in which he stated that the murders were committed out of personal greed and that he asked forgiveness from the victims' relatives.

Soon after his death, the local prosecutor's office opened a criminal case and ordered an inspection regarding the conditions of the prison. The Directorate of the Federal Penitentiary Service noted that there was a shortage of guards and up to 20 inmates per guard in the protective unit. It was also noted that in 2005, a total of eight inmates had died by suicide around various penitentiaries in Chelyabinsk Oblast, half of whom had been registered with psychiatrists. The problem of staff shortage was raised by the Directorate at a board meeting on March 24, 2006. Subsequently, all penitentiaries in the region had video cameras installed in their cells so they could observe the inmates at all times.

== See also ==
- Lonely hearts killer
- List of Russian serial killers
