= Anatoly Kondratyev =

Russian serial killer

- Born: Anatoly Vasilyevich Kondratyev; 31 January 1946 (age 80); Bayka, Penza Oblast, RSFSR
- Other names: "The Butcher"; Oleksandr Kornievich; Vitaliy Adamenko
- Convictions: Murder x5 Robbery; Theft; Speculation
- Penalty: 15 years imprisonment (1983); Life imprisonment (2004)

Details
- Victims: 5 (convicted); 17 (suspected); 42 (confessed)
- Span of crimes: 1983–2004
- Country: Soviet Union, later Ukraine
- States: Lviv, Odesa (confirmed); Kharkiv (suspected)
- Date apprehended: 10 March 2004

Anatoly Vasilyevich Kondratyev (Russian: Анатолий Васильевич Кондратьев; born 31 January 1946) is a Russian-Ukrainian serial killer who was linked to murders of at least four people in Ukraine between 2000 and 2004, committed after his release from prison for a previous homicide conviction. His crimes were noted for their brutality – involving dismembering the victims' bodies and hiding their remains – as well as for him evading detection by law enforcement for several years.

After his arrest, Kondratyev was charged with 17 murders, but was only successfully prosecuted for four and sentenced to life imprisonment. He himself claimed to have killed 42 people throughout his lifetime, a claim which was never verified.

== Early life and crimes ==
Anatoly Kondratyev was born on 31 January 1946 in the village of Bayka, Penza Oblast, in the Russian SFSR. He spent his childhood and youth in a stable home, and in the mid-1960s, he moved to the Leningrad Oblast, where he married and had two children, but abandoned his family shortly afterwards. During this period, he worked as an electrical engineer and a maritime transport worker.

Kondratyev began his criminal career in 1966, and after his first arrest, he was transferred to the Serbsky Center to undergo a forensic medical examination. Once he was found sane to stand trial, he was imprisoned for some time in Leningrad – upon his release, Kondratyev moved to the Odesa Oblast in the Ukrainian SSR, where he resumed committing small-time offenses such as thefts, frauds, speculation and other crimes. In the early 1980s, he moved to the Lviv Oblast, where he committed a murder in 1983. Due to his status as a repeat offender, Kondratyev was sentenced to 15 years imprisonment, which he served at the Yenakiieve Correctional Labor Colony No. 52 in the Donetsk Oblast.

At the turn of 1999 or 2000, Kondratyev was released and returned to Odesa. Not long after his release, he started committing murders.

== Murders ==
=== Modus operandi ===
As victims, Kondratyev chose elderly men and women who posted classified ads advertising various items for sale. Being tall and strong, Kondratyev introduced himself as a retired officer from the Armed Forces, making it easy for him to gain the trust of his victims. Once invited inside the home, he spent a considerable amount of time with the victims, familiarizing himself with the surroundings and making sure that there were no potential witnesses around. Kondratyev would then attack the victims using a knife or an axe, stabbing and hacking them multiple times.

After committing the murders, he stole money, jewelry, and other items of material value from the victims' residences. He would then dismember the bodies in the bathroom and put the remains in the fridge – on some occasions, he would disguise it as animal meat and offer it to the victims' neighbors and other tenants. As for the rest of the remains, he would bury them in vacant lots and forests, after which he would sell the apartment. Despite his elaborate scheme concerning body disposal, Kondratyev never bothered to remove fingerprints or the murder weapons from the crime scene, leaving numerous pieces of material evidence behind.

According to the Ministry of Internal Affairs, Kondratyev managed to sell the apartments of at least four victims prior to his arrest, accumulating approximately 20,000 hryvnia. Around 2002, he left the Odesa Oblast and moved to Lviv, where, according to his own confessions, continued committing murders. During this period, investigators allege that he met 26-year-old Valentyna Adamenko and her mother Iryna Haliy, who supposedly aided him in his crimes. Circumstantial evidence for these claims was the fact that Valentyna's husband, 38-year-old Vitaliy Valentynovich Adamenko, disappeared under mysterious circumstances in Boryslav, and that their joint apartment was sold by his wife, who was positively identified by a housing office clerk as the person who authorized the sale. Between October and November 2002, Kondratyev, Adamenko, and Haliy lived as tenants with several families in western Ukraine, where elderly apartment owners started vanishing without a trace.

=== Confirmed murders ===
According to investigators, Kondratyev's first confirmed murder took place in the summer of 2000 in Odesa. At that time, police officers discovered plastic bags containing meat of unknown origin inside an apartment on Voznesensky Lane – one placed in a room right on top of the TV, while the other in the freezer. After examining the remains, they were determined to contain human muscles and remains from a collarbone. The remains were identified as belonging to the 63-year-old owner of the apartment, who had recently been reported missing by her son. Inside the apartment, investigators located a suitcase, a cutting board with traces of human blood and an axe, all of which had Kondratyev's fingerprints on them.

In early September 2003, Kondratyev murdered a 66-year-old woman, known only by her first name "Nina", at her apartment on Krasnova Street in Odesa. On 10 September, officers from the Kyiv District Police Department were dispatched to the residence, where they found her mutilated body and a bag with various tools, two knives, and a hammer. They also located a note addressed to a friend of the victim named Galya, which stated that the victim had taken in two women from Kyiv and that she would visit her after returning home from the hospital in the evening. Handwriting analysis determined it was not written by "Nina", and it was most likely the work of her killer. While interviewing witnesses, investigators determined that the victim had rented the apartment to an unknown man who appeared to be in his 60s, was of medium height, thin, and had light brown hair.

In the fall of 2003, Kondratyev killed a 53-year-old man inside his apartment on Belinskiy Street. Officers who were called to check in on the man found his mutilated and headless corpse inside, with pieces of his skin flayed and all of his toes and fingers amputated. In the course of the investigation, officers interviewed a family which was living in one of the victim's rooms since February 2000, learning from a female tenant that near the end of summer, the apartment owner introduced them to a man whom he described as his "friend". The tenant later positively identified this man as Kondratyev.

In December 2003, Kondratyev read an advertisement in the newspaper stating that a nanny was needed to take care of a child, after which he called the listed phone number. Introducing himself as a professional teacher, he agreed on the price of $200 for his services and went to the apartment on Gaidar Street, where, during a conversation with the 62-year-old homeowner, he attacked and killed her in a similar manner to his previous victims. His fingerprints were found at the crime scene, after which an arrest warrant was issued for him.

=== Suspected murders ===
Besides the aforementioned murders and the disappearance of Vitaliy Adamenko, Kondratyev was suspected of involvement in numerous other disappearances across the Odesa and Lviv Oblasts due to material evidence and eyewitness testimony placing him at the crime scenes. However, he was never charged with any of these cases due to the absence of bodies. When he was questioned later on about this, Kondratyev claimed that he took great care to dispose of his victims' remains and did so in a variety of ways, including burying them, throwing them in the trash, flushing them down the toilet and even giving jars and bags of their flesh to neighbors. At one home he supposedly stayed at, plumbers were called in to fix a supposed broken water pipe, only to find it clogged with numerous pieces of human skin.

== Final murder and capture ==
Kondratyev was arrested on 10 March 2004, shortly after murdering an elderly man in Odesa inside his sixth-floor apartment on 46 Academician Williams Street. While he was in the midst of dismembering his body with an axe, at approximately 10:30 PM, he was interrupted by 42-year-old Volodymyr Polyakov, a minibus driver who rented a room in the apartment. Surprised by the strange man, Polyakov asked who he was, to which Kondratyev replied in a rude manner. Angered, Polyakov immediately attacked Kondratyev, after which the two struggled in a brief fight before Kondratyev knocked Polyakov back and attempted to flee. Polyakov got back on his feet and decided to chase after him, while other residents called the police. Not long after, officers from the third patrol unit managed to corner Kondratyev at a nearby apartment block, where he surrendered.

While searching through his belongings, officers uncovered a fake Ukrainian passport in the name of a "Oleksandr Vasilyevich Kornievich", which showed that he was born on 20 November 1949 in Russia's Tula Oblast, was a permanent resident of Ivano-Frankivsk and that the passport was issued on 27 January 1998 with the identification number "SS 446331". Witnesses later claimed that he also introduced himself as Vitaliy Adamenko, leading additional credence to the theory that he was involved in the man's disappearance.

Following his capture, Kondratyev was charged with ten murders in total, seven in the Odesa Oblast and three in the Lviv Oblast. On 13 March 2004, the court ordered that he be detained to prevent the possibility of him escaping. During subsequent questioning, Kondratyev agreed to cooperat with investigators and confessed to multiple murders in great detail.

For his courage and bravery concerning the arrest of Kondratyev, Volodymyr Polyakov was awarded 2,000 hryvnia in cash from the regional department of the Ministry of Internal Affairs. Additionally, Lt. General Grigory Epur, head of the Odesa Ministry of Internal Affairs, awarded police chief Yevhenii Levitskiy and three of the patrol officers responsible for arresting the criminal with a "For a Distinction in Service, 2nd class" medal.

== Confessions, trial, and imprisonment ==
In his confessions, Kondratyev admitted to a total of 42 murders, many of which were previously unknown to the investigators. He claimed that his first murder after his release from prison took place in the Lviv Oblast, where he killed a notary by staging a gas explosion in order to steal notarial forms and a seal. He said that the idea to use stolen documents to forge papers and sell apartments came from this crime. When asked about what he did with the notarial forms, Kondratyev said he used them to sell an apartment to a prosecutor based in Kherson.

After he was found sane to stand trial in the summer of 2004, Kondratyev was charged with 17 murders in total: eight in Odesa, six in Lviv and three in Kharkiv. In addition, he was also charged with four other serious crimes that supposedly took place in Odesa's Suvorovsky District and in Simferopol, Crimea. However, at the end of his trial before the Odesa Court of Appeals, he was found guilty of only six crimes: three murders, robbery, and fraud. Similarly, his trial in Lviv ended up with him being convicted of only one murder and two counts of fraud. For these crimes, he was sentenced to life imprisonment. The court also ruled that since he had received no proper documentation after his previous release from prison, Kondratyev was now officially a Ukrainian citizen.

When pressed for an explanation, investigators noted that the courts did not take into account his confessions mostly due to the lack of bodies, despite clear circumstantial evidence placing him at most of the crimes. This was noted by head prosecutor Oleh Poizner, who reiterated that the modus operandi and the fingerprints all matched Kondratyev.

Since his conviction, there has been no reliable information about Kondratyev's status, although his case is sometimes brought up in discussions surrounding serial killers in Ukraine. In 2012, the brother of one of the victims, a criminal investigator, was arrested for the murder of mobster Volodymyr Kosovsky, to whom he owned money. The murder of the man's sister was used as a mitigating factor to explain his actions.

== In the media and culture ==
The Kondratyev case was covered on a documentary aired on Ukraine's Channel 7, titled "The Lodger" (Russian: Квартирант).

== See also ==
- List of serial killers by country
- List of incidents of cannibalism
- Lonely hearts killer
