= Paul Gregory (producer) =

American film, stage, and TV producer (1920–2015)

- Born: James Burton Lenhart; August 27, 1920; Waukee, Iowa, U.S.
- Died: December 25, 2015 (aged 95); Desert Hot Springs, California, U.S.
- Occupations: Producer; writer
- Spouses: Janet Gaynor (m. 1964; died 1984) Kathryn Obergfel (m. 1998; died 2001)

Paul Gregory (August 27, 1920 – December 25, 2015) was an American producer for stage, film and television.

== Early life ==
Gregory was the son of a butcher and his wife. He went to public schools and graduated in 1938 from Lincoln High School in Des Moines, Iowa.

== Career ==
Gregory went to Hollywood where he worked as a personal assistant for such clients as bandleader Horace Heidt and pianist Carmen Cavallaro. He became friends with actor and director Charles Laughton and organized a successful lecture tour for Laughton throughout the United States between 1949 and 1950. Laughton earned $200,000 during this reading tour; the money served him as the basis for other projects.

Gregory afterward produced 17 Broadway plays during the 1950s and 1960s, among them The Caine Mutiny Court-Martial, 3 for Tonight, The Marriage Go-Around and Lord Pengo.

Gregory read the novel The Night of the Hunter by Davis Grubb and bought the film rights. He subsequently produced the thriller adaptation, The Night of the Hunter (1955), directed by Laughton. While not a success in the 1950s, the film has since gained an increasingly high reputation. By 2007 it was considered by film critics to be a masterpiece, in which Gregory played an important role as producer. His second for his development of The Caine Mutiny Court-Martial.

Gregory was also responsible for starting the acting career of his friend James Garner. He gave Garner his first acting role in his production of The Caine Mutiny Court-Martial.

== Personal life ==
In 1964, Gregory married former film star Janet Gaynor. Afterward, he gradually retired from show business and raised cows, hogs, and pigeons at their ranch. Gregory and Gaynor were involved in a very serious car accident in 1982; two years later Gaynor died from her injuries. In 1998, Gregory married art gallerist Kathryn Obergfel, who died three years later.

Gregory lived in his retirement in Desert Hot Springs, just north of Palm Springs, California. Gregory died in December 2015 at the age of 95 from a self-inflicted gunshot. A friend said that Gregory "died the way he wanted" and that he was depressed about his failing physical health and having outlived most of his friends. His death was not reported until November 2016.

== Filmography ==
As a producer

- The Night of the Hunter (1955)
- Front Row Center (1955; 1 episode)
- Ford Star Jubilee (1955/1956; 2 episodes, also writer for one)
- The Naked and the Dead (1958)

As himself

- The Ed Sullivan Show (1955)
- This Is Your Life - James Garner (1958)
- The Hollywood Greats - Charles Laughton (1978)
- Moving Pictures (1995)
- Biography - Janet Gaynor (2001)
