= A Dream of Kings (novel) =

1955 novel by Davis Grubb

- First edition
- Author: Davis Grubb
- Cover artist: Richard Powers
- Language: English
- Genre: Historical
- Publisher: Scribners
- Publication date: 1955
- Publication place: United States
- Media type: Print (hardback)
- Pages: 357
- LC Class: PZ4.G884 Dr PS3513.R865

A Dream of Kings is a novel written by American author Davis Grubb, published in 1955. The novel describes the life of Tom Christopher during the American Civil War in Virginia.

== Story line and development ==
The novel is set in Virginia, which then becomes West Virginia, and on American Civil War battlefields between 1855 and 1864. Tom Christopher lives with his Aunt Sarah, and another girl his aunt has taken in, Catherine Ellen Hornbrook, or just Cathi as she is called. Her father Abijah Hornbrook, never appears in the novel, but his presence is felt. The "dream of kings" is the Confederacy. "A storm is gathering upon our land and when it has passed [Abija Hornbrook writes to his daughter] you may see a new nation upon this continent and you will know that I have helped to form it....a time of kings....Yes, this nation shall belong to the gentlemen who founded it. When the war comes Tom fights under the command of Stonewall Jackson. When Jackson dies, Tom deserts, and goes back to West Virginia. Once there he falls in love with Cathi.

== Editions ==
- Charles Scribner's Sons, 1955. This was Grubb's first novel for Scribner's.

== Reviews ==
Time had a favorable opinion upon the novel: "Novelist Grubb...has now attempted what might have been a commonplace story...but...he writes with such emotional conviction and lyric intensity that the book emerges as an authentic and haunting experience."
