= Shadow of My Brother =

- First edition (publ. Holt Rinehart Winston)
- Author: Davis Grubb
- Language: English
- Publication date: 1966

Shadow of My Brother is a 1966 novel by American author Davis Grubb.

== Story line and development ==
A young boy is brutally murdered in a Southern town while five people watch. The author goes back three generations of the Wilson family to build a narrative of terror and evil.

== Editions ==
- Holt, Rinehart & Winston 1966. This was Grubb's first and only novel for Holt, Rinehart & Winston.

== Reviews ==
Louis Grubb in his preface to You Never Believe Me quotes Lillian Smiths's review of the novel: Shadow of My Brother...is one of the best novels ever written on the mind-in-depth of a white-racist. Davis Grubb knows of evil and sweetness in the human heart as few writers understand it.

An unsigned review published in Time Magazine was not so generous: At its best, Grubb's imagery is impressive and his prose is lyrical. But his uncontrolled bombast, his near-hysterical characters, and his determination to leave no grit unhominized often make the cliché-ridden novel read like a bad parody.
