= Mount Clare, West Virginia =

- Unincorporated community
- Location within West Virginia Location within the United States
- Coordinates: 39°12′55″N 80°20′44″W
- Country: United States
- State: West Virginia
- County: Harrison
- Elevation: 1,020 ft (310 m)
- Time zone: UTC-5 (Eastern (EST))
  - Summer (DST): UTC-4 (EDT)
- ZIP code: 26408
- Area codes: 304 & 681
- GNIS feature ID: 2627670

Mount Clare is an unincorporated community in Harrison County, West Virginia, United States. Mount Clare is 4.5 miles (7.2 km) south of Clarksburg. Mount Clare has a post office with ZIP code 26408.

== History ==
The community was named after Mount Clare Shops in Baltimore. The Quiet Dell School is listed on the National Register of Historic Places.
