= Quiet Dell, West Virginia =

- Unincorporated community
- Location within West Virginia Location within the United States
- Coordinates: 39°13′09″N 80°17′37″W
- Country: United States
- State: West Virginia
- County: Harrison
- Elevation: 1,056 ft (322 m)
- Time zone: UTC-5 (Eastern (EST))
  - Summer (DST): UTC-4 (EDT)
- Area codes: 304 & 681
- GNIS feature ID: 1545347

Quiet Dell is an unincorporated community in Harrison County, West Virginia, United States. Quiet Dell is located at the junction of Interstate 79 and West Virginia Route 20, 5 miles (8.0 km) southeast of Clarksburg.

== Community ==
The community's name is descriptive. The area is primarily single-family residential in nature on large lots.

Key retail businesses in Quiet Dell include the 7-Eleven-BP and Exxon gas stations, Dollar General, and Stonewood Bulk Foods. Several businesses related to the oil and gas industry are based within the community.

Tourist attractions include the Civilian Conservation Corps (CCC) Museum in the old school, and Primitives, a crafting cooperative. The historic Quiet Dell United Methodist Church, dating from 1896, is also located here.

== History ==
In 1931, Quiet Dell was the scene of multiple murders committed by serial killer Harry Powers (Herman Drenth).

The Quiet Dell School was listed on the National Register of Historic Places in 2001.
