= Murder of Margaret Martin =

American homicide victim

- Margaret Martin
- Date: December 17–20, 1938
- Location: Luzerne County, Pennsylvania/Wyoming County, Pennsylvania, United States
- Type: Homicide
- Deaths: 1 (victim)
- Burial: St. Ignatius Church in Kingston
- Coroner: R. W. Greenwood
- Convicted: No conviction (unsolved case)

Margaret Martin (April 19th, 1919 – December 1938) was a resident of Kingston, Pennsylvania, United States, who went missing on December 17, 1938, and was found dead in Wyoming County, Pennsylvania, several days later. Martin was a recent graduate of the Wilkes-Barre Business College. On December 17, 1938, she met an unknown man who claimed to be offering her a secretarial job, and was never seen alive again. Her body was discovered in the wilderness 25 miles (40 km) away by a hunter four days later. Martin's death resulted in a lengthy manhunt. Numerous suspects were examined, but no one was ever convicted of the crime. As of 2026, it remains an unsolved case.

== Victim ==
Margaret Martin was a resident of Kingston, in Luzerne County, Pennsylvania. She graduated from Kingston High School in 1937. She took classes at the Wilkes-Barre Business College to gain secretarial skills and graduated with honors at the beginning of December 1938. She was 19 years old at the time of her death.

According to Betty Hopkins, a former classmate, Martin was "a shy, studious, friendly girl who had many friends." Her parents described her as "a living saint." She was also a devout Catholic.

Martin's father was John Martin, a local foreman and minor politician. Margaret Martin was the eldest of four children.

== Disappearance ==
On December 17, 1938, a man contacted Martin, claiming that he was setting up an insurance company and needed a secretary, adding that he had heard of her through the Wilkes-Barre Business College. The two agreed to meet in Kingston Corners, not far from Martin's home.

Martin was first noted to be missing that evening, after she had failed to return home from the alleged job interview. Several witnesses said they saw her getting into a brown Plymouth or black sedan with a man after a brief conversation. This was the last time she was seen alive. The witnesses were able to give only vague descriptions of the man, described as a "suave, neat, sandy-haired young man," and did not identify the car's license plate. The man was between 25 and 30 years of age and slightly overweight. Martin's friends and family called the police and started a search, but her disappearance was difficult to publicize since the local newspapers were on strike.

== Death and discovery of the body ==
According to a 1999 article in the Times Leader, Martin was tortured and murdered in a sawmill in the mountains about 15 miles (24 km) from the creek where her body was found. According to theories by the police, the killer had attempted to dismember her body and destroy it in the mill's firebox, but had been scared off by the mill's owner, James Kedd. Kedd had assumed that the killer was a mere trespasser and had fired a warning shot in the killer's direction. The killer then drove to a point close to the creek and carried Martin's body the final 75 yards to the creek, where he abandoned it.

Initially, it was suspected that Martin's disappearance was linked to a sex slavery ring. However, her body was discovered in the forested wilderness of Northmoreland Township, Wyoming County, on December 21, 1938, about 25 miles (40 km) from her home. The discoverer was 19-year-old Anthony Rezykowski, who was trapping muskrats in the area. Rezykowski noticed a large burlap bag partially submerged in 2 feet (0.61 m) of water in a creek. Upon further investigation, he found the bag to contain the mutilated body of a young woman with no clothing. The body was soon identified as Margaret Martin. At the time of her body's discovery, she had been dead for at least 24 hours. If not for Rezykowski's discovery of her body, it may have gone unnoticed for several years.

Martin's body showed signs of having been beaten—perhaps with a rock—and strangled. She had bruises on her throat and body, as well as knife wounds on her stomach and thigh. Her autopsy found the cause of death to be strangulation and stated that she had "suffered the molestation of a degenerate."

== Initial investigations ==
Investigators at the location where Martin's body was discovered

After the discovery of Martin's body, approximately 75 state troopers combed the area in search of clues. However, no tire tracks were seen near the site where her body was found, and the burlap bag proved to be of no use in identifying any suspects. According to The Citizens' Voice, burned cloth matching the clothing Martin was wearing when she was last seen was discovered at an abandoned sawmill near Forkston. However, an article in The Kane Republican stated that this was not the origin of the cloth. An incident involving a bundle of clothing being thrown from a car near Orwigsburg proved to be unrelated to Martin's killing.

On December 22, the Scranton Tribune predicted that Martin's killer would be arrested within 24 hours.

Many hundreds of people attended Martin's funeral at St. Ignatius Church in Kingston on December 24. Plainclothes police officers also attended her funeral in the hopes of noticing anyone suspicious attending.

Several theories about the identity of Martin's murderer were suggested by locals. These included a mortician from Wyoming County, a businessman's son who left the area soon after the murder, a local assistant pastor, a teacher at the Wilkes-Barre Business College, and a local teenager who had a crush on Martin. Two men who had attempted to attack a 16-year-old girl from Hanover Township, Luzerne County, were also investigated. Some investigators believed that due to the killer's familiarity with the area's terrain, the killer must have been a local. More recently, it has been suggested that the killer was actually a non-local serial killer.

== Impact and aftermath ==
On December 28, 1938, Pennsylvania state senator Leo C. Mundy stated that at the next state legislature, he would introduce a bill making sex crimes punishable by execution and requiring registration for all sex offenders. Mundy had resolved to introduce the bill due to Martin's murder. Physicians and welfare and social service workers would also be required to report anyone with tendencies towards such offenses.

By the beginning of 1939, most clues pertaining to Martin's murder had proven to be useless. The manhunt for the killer was still ongoing in February of that year, but the police had not turned up any more information. In June 1939, further clues were discovered, but the killer was not identified.

Although a very large number of suspects were investigated after Martin's death, no perpetrator was ever identified.

In September 1942, Orban Taylor of New York City confessed to Martin's murder. However, his confession was proven to be false after ten hours of investigation. Taylor was not charged with that crime although he did confess to several other crimes.

In 1948, a decade after Martin's murder, the case was one of the few major unsolved murders in Pennsylvania. In 1999, Peter Paul Olszewski Jr., who was at the time the Luzerne County District Attorney, stated that even with modern criminal investigation methods and forensic techniques, it is unlikely that the identity of Martin's killer will be discovered. It is presumed that the killer is now long-deceased.

== See also ==
- Lists of solved missing person cases
- List of unsolved murders (1900–1979)
