= Lonely hearts killer =

Murderer targeting personal ad writers

A lonely hearts killer (or want-ad killer) is a criminal who commits murder by prior contacting a victim who has either posted advertisements to or answered advertisements via newspaper classified ads and personal or lonely hearts ads.

== Varied motives ==
The actual motivations of these criminals are varied. By definition, a killing will have taken place in as much as the suspected, accused, or convicted perpetrator has been dubbed a want-ad or lonely hearts killer. However, the crime may have involved a simple robbery gone wrong, an elaborate insurance fraud scheme, sexual violence/rape, or any of several other ritualized pathological impulses (e.g. necrophilia, mutilation, cannibalism, etc.). Sometimes murder is not the original intent, but becomes a by-product of rape or other struggles; in some cases, murder is committed simply to cover up the original crime. Some, on the other hand, are serial killers who utilize this modus operandi either exclusively or when it suits them.

== Notable lonely hearts and want-ad killers ==
The following accused and convicted murderers and serial killers are known to have used want ads, personal ads, and/or matrimonial bureaus to contact their victims:

- Elfriede Blauensteiner (1931–2003) – known as "The Black Widow"
- Viktor Bolkhovsky (b. 1959) – known as "The Necromancer Maniac"
- Rodney Francis Cameron (1952–2025) – known as "The Lonely Hearts Killer"
- Harvey Carignan (1927–2023) – known as "The Want-Ad Killer"
- Nannie Doss (1905–1965) – known as "The Lonely Hearts Killer", among other names
- Amelia Dyer (1836–1896) – known as "The Ogress of Reading"
- Raymond Fernandez (1914–1951) and Martha Beck (1920–1951) – known as "The Honeymoon Killers" and "The Lonely Hearts Killers"
- Albert Fish (1870–1936)
- Harvey Glatman (1927–1959) – known as "The Lonely Hearts Killer"
- Denis Gorbunov (1977–2006)
- Belle Gunness (1859–1908?) – she became part of American criminal folklore, a female Bluebeard.
- Robert Hansen (1939–2014)
- Béla Kiss (1877–19?)
- Anatoly Kondratyev (b. 1946)
- Sheila LaBarre (b. 1958) – serving two consecutive life sentences for two murders on farm she inherited from deceased husband. Boyfriend later died, as did a man who replied to her personal ad.
- Henri Désiré Landru (1869–1922)
- Bobby Joe Long (1953–2019) – known as "The Classified Ad Rapist"
- Philip Markoff (1986–2010) – known as "The Craigslist Killer"
- Harry Powers (1892–1932) – known as "The Lonely Hearts Killer", "The West Virginia Bluebeard", and "The Butcher of Clarksburg"

== See also ==
- Internet homicide
- Murder of Margaret Martin
