= Davis Grubb =

American novelist

Davis Bobby Grubb
- Born: Davis Alexander Grubb; July 23, 1919; New-Manchester, West Virginia, U.S.
- Died: July 24, 1980 (aged 61); New York City, U.S.
- Occupations: Novelist, short story writer
- Writing career
- Notable works: Night of the Hunter, Fools' Parade

Davis Bobby Grubb (July 23, 1919 – July 24, 1980) was an American novelist and short story author, known best for his 1953 novel The Night of the Hunter, which was adapted as a movie in 1955 by Charles Laughton.

== Biography ==
Born in New-Manchester, West Virginia, Grubb wanted to combine his creative skills as a painter with writing, and attended the Carnegie Institute of Technology in Pittsburgh, Pennsylvania. However, his color blindness was a handicap he could not overcome and he abandoned painting to dedicate himself to writing fiction. He did, however, make a number of drawings and sketches during his career, some of which were incorporated into his writings.

In 1940, Grubb relocated to New York City where he worked at NBC Radio as a writer while using his free time to write short stories. During the mid-1940s he was successful in selling several short stories to major magazines and during the early 1950s he started writing a full-length novel. Influenced by accounts of economic hardship by depression-era Americans that his mother had seen firsthand as a social worker, Grubb wrote The Night of the Hunter, which became a bestseller and was voted a finalist for the 1955 National Book Award. That same year, the book was made into a movie featuring Robert Mitchum as the story's villain, sham preacher and fanatical serial killer Reverend Harry Powell. Deemed "culturally significant" by the Library of Congress, the movie was selected for preservation in the United States National Film Registry.

Grubb later produced another nine novels and several collections of short stories. His 1969 novel Fools' Parade would also be made into a 1971 motion picture featuring James Stewart. Some of Grubb's short stories were adapted for television by Alfred Hitchcock and by Rod Serling for his Night Gallery series.

Grubb died in New York City in 1980. His novel Ancient Lights was published posthumously in 1982, and St. Martins Press published 18 of his short stories in a book collection titled You Never Believe Me and Other Stories in 1989.

== Bibliography ==
=== Novels ===
- The Night of the Hunter (1953)
- A Dream of Kings (1955)
- The Watchman (1961)
- The Voices of Glory (1962)
- A Tree Full of Stars (1965)
- Shadow of My Brother (1966)
- The Golden Sickle (1968)
- Fools' Parade (1969)
- The Barefoot Man (1971)
- Ancient Lights (1982)

=== Story Collections ===
- Twelve Tales of Suspense and the Supernatural (UK title: One Foot in the Grave) (1964)
- The Siege of 318: Thirteen Mystical Stories (1978)
- You Never Believe Me and Other Stories (1989)
