= Hilda Wiseman =

New Zealand bookplate designer, artist, and calligrapher (1894–1982)

- Wiseman in 1980
- Born: Hilda Alexandra Wiseman; 7 April 1894; Mooroopna, Victoria, Australia
- Died: 28 April 1982 (aged 88); Auckland, New Zealand
- Known for: Illustration; calligraphy
- Movement: Linocut

Hilda Alexandra Wiseman (7 April 1894 – 28 April 1982) was a New Zealand bookplate designer, artist and calligrapher.

Wiseman was born in Mooroopna, Victoria, Australia, on 7 April 1894.

She attended Elam School of Art, and Seddon Memorial Technical College

Wiseman began her artistic career as a commercial artist at the Chandler and Company advertising firm. In 1925 she created her first linocut bookplate. She went on to design over 100 bookplates.

In 1930 she held an exhibition of book-plates from Australia, Spain, America, England, Russia, Czechoslovakia, Austria, Belgium, Italy, Germany and New Zealand, at Auckland Art Gallery, successfully attracting between two and three thousand visitors. New Zealand bookplates were by Wiseman, Arnold Goodwin, Thomas Gulliver, Connie Lloyd and Trevor Lloyd. That year she also co-founded the Auckland Branch, New Zealand Ex Libris Society (NZELS), and in 1931 started her own art studio, the Selwyn Studio.

At the time of her death in 1982, the Auckland Historical Society received her bequest of the Selwyn Studio, and its contents.
