= Auckland Ex Libris Society =

New Zealand bookplate society

- An Auckland Ex Libris Society Bookplate; Artist: Ron Stenberg (1919–2017)
- Abbreviation: AELS
- Formation: 27 November 1930; 95 years ago
- Founders: Edward Burton Gunson; Olive Wilson; Ida Eise; Hilda Wiseman; Howard Coverdale + 14 members
- Founded at: Auckland
- Type: Learned Society
- Headquarters: Kinder House
- Location: Auckland, New Zealand
- Parent organisation: New Zealand Ex Libris and Booklovers Society (1930–1979)
- Affiliations: The New Australian Bookplate Society

Auckland Ex Libris Society (AELS) is a New Zealand learned society dedicated to the study, design, production, collection and appreciation of ex libris / bookplates, as well as many aspects of the book arts.

== History ==
The Society was founded as Auckland Branch, New Zealand Ex Libris Society (NZELS) by Dr Edward Burton Gunson, Olive Wilson, Ida Eise, Hilda Wiseman, Dr Howard Coverdale and others, at an inaugural meeting held at the Auckland Society of Arts on 27 November 1930. Though not all attendees were named, the Society started with 19 foundation members.

Auckland Branch changed its name to the current form on 1 September 1954. With NZELS ceasing operation in 1960 and extinct from 1979, it carries on as the only ex libris / bookplate society in New Zealand, as well as the oldest in Australasia.

== Activities ==
The Society remains active, playing a significant role in promoting the art of bookplates within the Auckland region. It holds monthly meetings from May to November each year, and produces occasional workshops, exhibitions and published works.

== Gallery ==
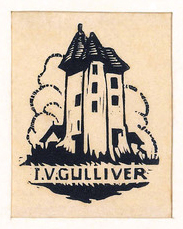
Ex Libris T. V. Gulliver (1891–1933) by Thomas Gulliver. Woodcut.

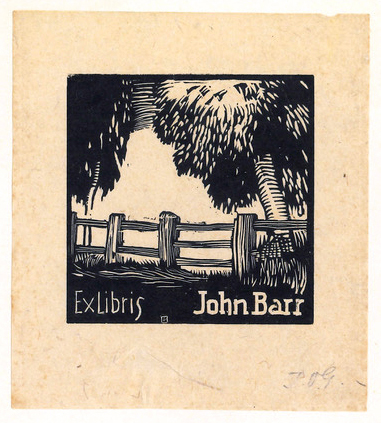
Ex Libris John Barr (1887–1971) by Thomas Gulliver. Woodcut, c. 1925.

== Publications ==
- Auckland War Memorial Museum; Auckland Ex Libris Society (1956), The Percy Neville Barnett Bookplate Collection, Auckland: Pegasus Press. "This souvenir brochure is issued by the Auckland Ex Libris Society to commemorate the handing over of the P. Neville Barnett bookplate collection to the Auckland War Memorial Museum"
- Auckland Ex Libris Society (1986). In Memory of Philip F. Prescott. Auckland: Auckland Ex Libris Society.
- Auckland Ex Libris Society (1990), The Auckland Ex Libris Society. Brochure No. 1 (incorrectly marked "No. 7")
- Auckland Ex Libris Society (2005). Thwaites, Ian; Fletcher, Rie M. (eds.). 75 Years of Bookplates: Auckland Ex Libris Society, 1930–2005. Auckland: Puriri Press. ISBN 9780908943319.
- Auckland Ex Libris Society (2010). Thwaites, Ian (ed.). 5 Years Further On: Auckland Ex Libris Society 80th Anniversary, 1930–2010. Auckland: Puriri Press.
- Auckland Ex Libris Society (2021). Thwaites, Ian (ed.). 10 More Years: Auckland Ex Libris Society 90th Anniversary, 1930–2020. Auckland: Auckland Ex Libris Society.
- Thwaites, Ian (2022). Their Personal Ex Libris: Bookplates of Auckland Ex Libris Society Members from 1930 to the Present Day. Celebrating the 90th Anniversary of Auckland Ex Libris Society. Auckland: Ian Thwaites. ISBN 9780473611309.

== See also ==
- Bookplate
- Book collecting
