= Drogin =

Drogin is a surname. Notable people with the surname include:

- Bob Drogin (born 1952), American journalist
- Ethan Drogin, American television producer and writer
- Marc Drogin (1936–2017), American author
