= Ernst Keil =

German bookseller (1816–1878)

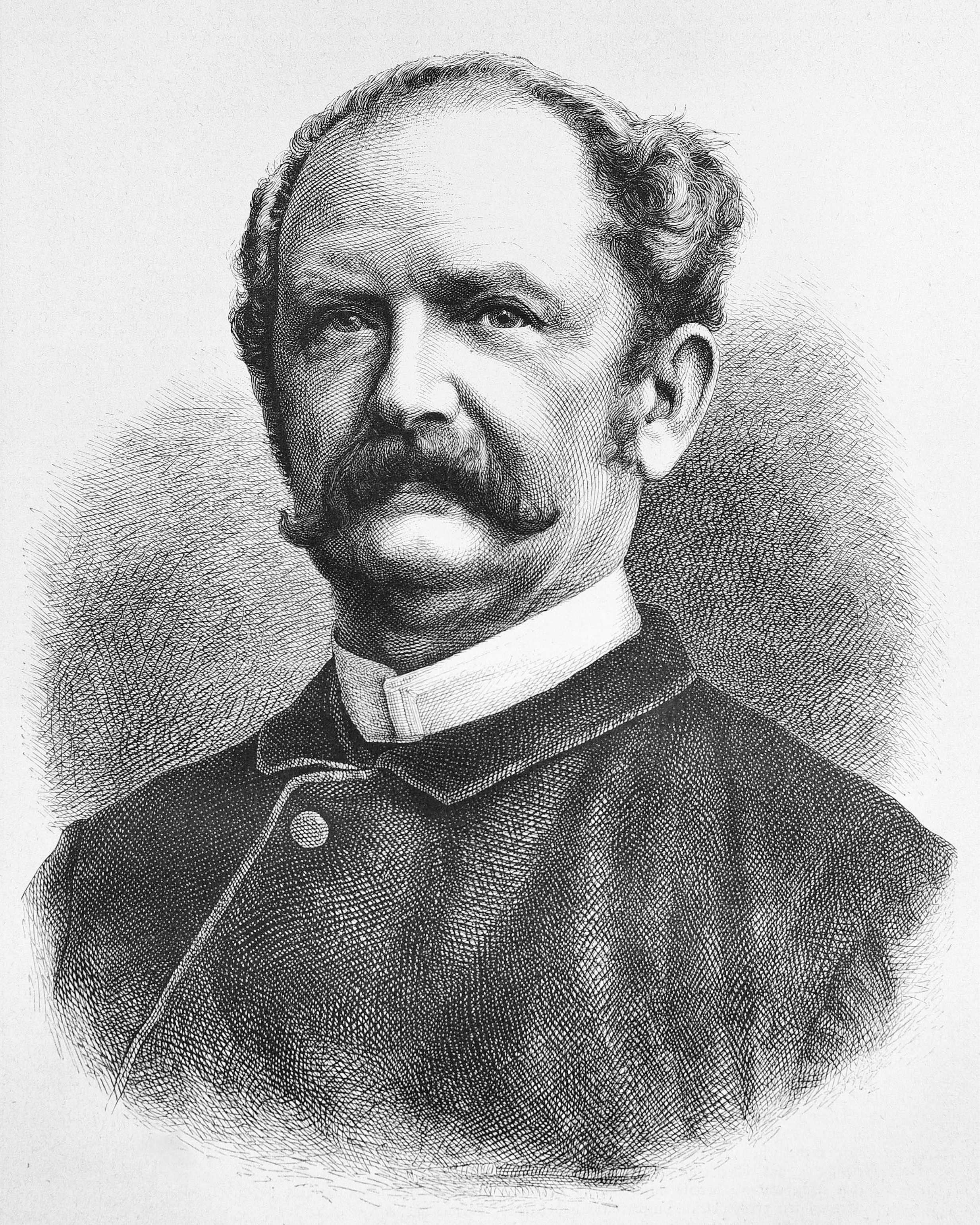
- Keil in 1878
- Born: Ernst Victor Keil; 6 December 1816; Bad Langensalza, Province of Saxony, Kingdom of Prussia
- Died: 23 March 1878 (aged 61); Leipzig, Kingdom of Saxony, German Empire
- Occupations: Bookseller; Journalist; Writer; Editor; Publisher
- Spouse: Karoline Aston (m. 1844)
- Children: Alfred (†1871), Anna, Karoline
- Writing career
- Notable works: Unser Planet; Der Leuchtthurm; Die Gartenlaube
- Literary movement: Junges Deutschland; Vormärz; Poetic realism

Ernst Victor Keil (6 December 1816 – 23 March 1878) was a German bookseller, journalist, editor and publisher. His early publications promoted liberal views and satirized famous politicians leading up to the German revolutions of 1848–49, resulting in government censorship and earning him a short prison stay in 1852. He then developed Die Gartenlaube, a weekly illustrated magazine aimed at enlightening and entertaining the whole family, particularly the middle and lower classes of society. It became the first successful mass-market German language magazine. By the time of his death in 1878, Gartenlaube had reached a paid circulation of 382,000 and an actual readership of at least 2 million, making it one of the most widely read publications in the world at the time. Keil's work had a significant and lasting influence on the formation of a German national identity before, during and after the unification of Germany in 1871.

== Early life ==
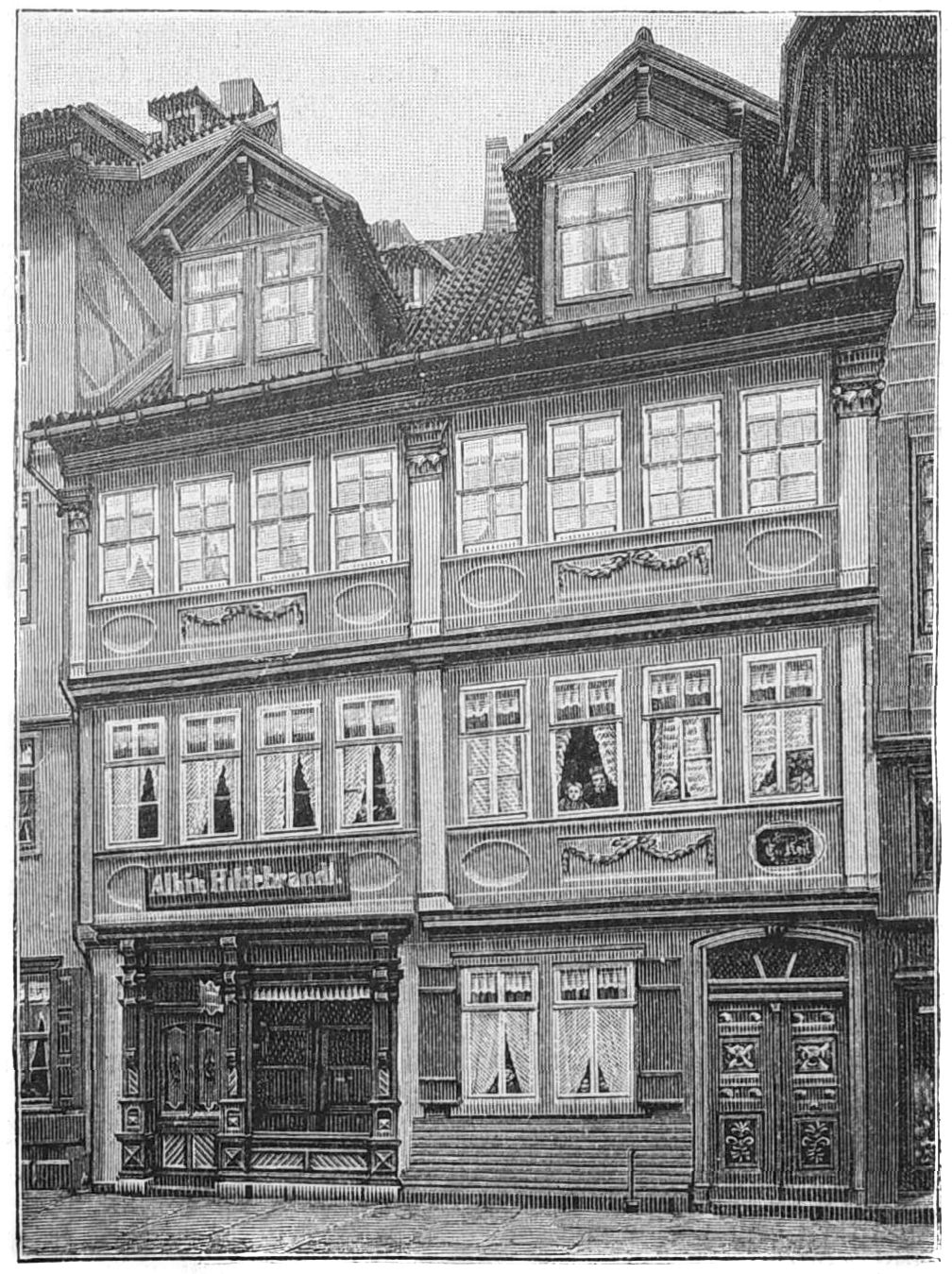
Birthplace of Ernst Keil in Bad Langensalza; photo by Christian Bregazzi in Die Gartenlaube, 1897

Ernst Keil was born in 1816 at his parents' home on the Marktstraße in Bad Langensalza, Province of Saxony. The son of a retired court clerk, he attended gymnasium in Mühlhausen and after this voluntarily entered Prussian army duty in Erfurt. Even as a high school student and during his military service Keil was an active writer and supporter of the Junges Deutschland literary movement. He apprenticed at the book publishing firm Hofbuchhandlung Hoffmann in Weimar, which was closely connected with the intellectual royal court of Karl August, Grand Duke of Saxe-Weimar-Eisenach. Through this relationship the young Keil came to know Johann Wolfgang von Goethe.

In 1837 Keil became an assistant at Weygands Booksellers in Leipzig, the second-largest city in the Kingdom of Saxony and a center for various liberal movements. He soon took up journalism alongside his professional work as a bookseller and in 1838 was appointed editor of the magazine Unser Planet (Our Planet), later dubbed Wanderstern (Wandering Star). Under Keil's leadership, Planet became one of the most widely read German language publications of its time. The journal attacked the then political situation, subsequently running into problems with censorship and the police, until political concerns as well as business considerations made it impossible for him to continue as editor.

Ernst Keil married Karoline Aston in Leipzig in 1844, with whom he had two daughters and a son.

== Revolution and prison ==
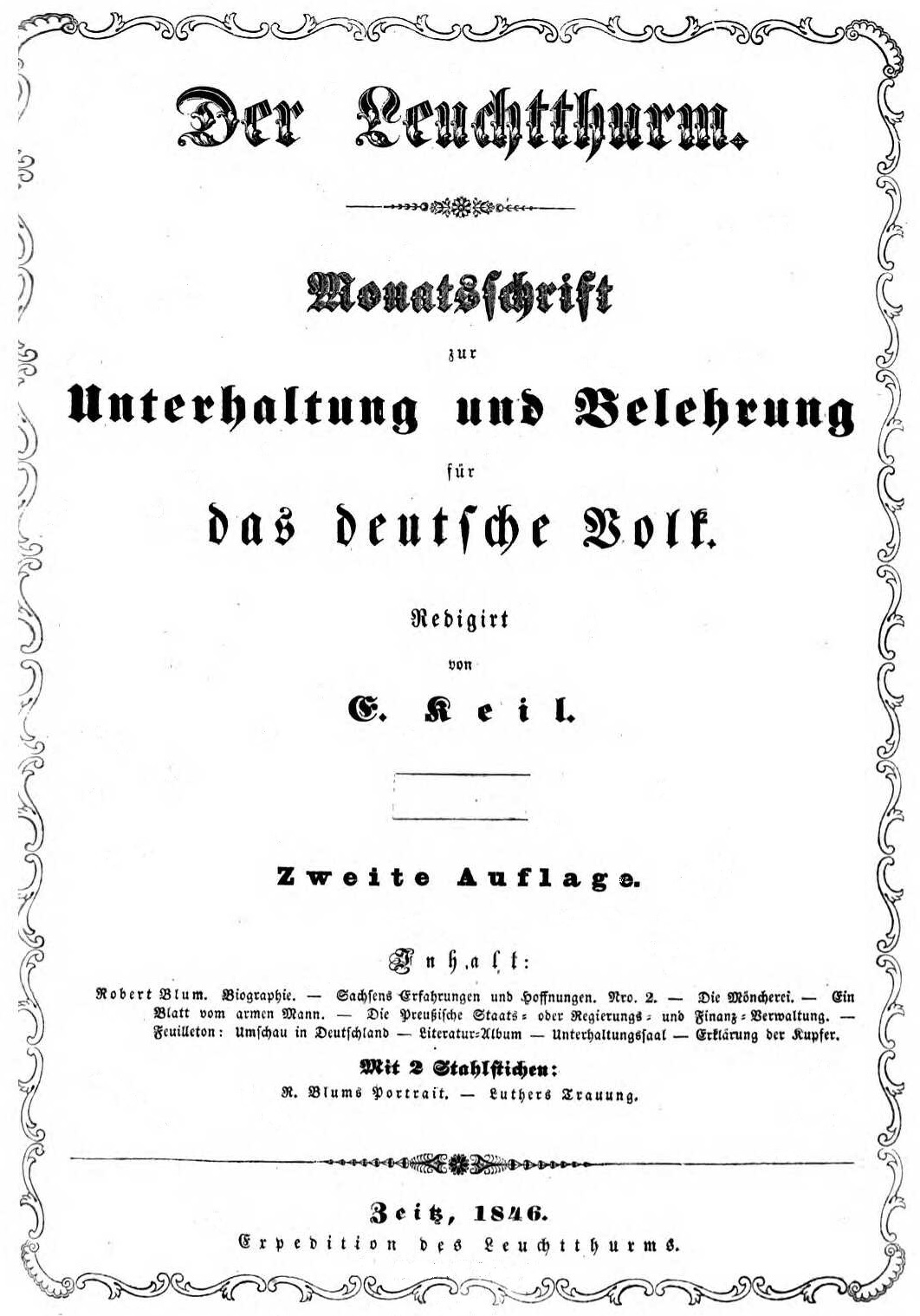
Second edition of The Lighthouse, 1846

Keil founded his own book publishing business on August 3, 1845. His first publication was a brochure on potato diseases in Börsenblatt, the official journal of the Association of German Booksellers in Leipzig. From 1846 he also began editing a monthly journal entitled Der Leuchtthurm (The Lighthouse), a "magazine for politics, literature and social life." Keil employed eminent writers from the democratic and liberal spectrum, including Robert Blum, Johann Jacoby, Gustav Adolf Wislicenus, Ernst Dronke, and Leberecht Uhlich. It was the first popular expression of an awakened intellectual political movement in Germany and soon became the most important publication during the Vormärz, the period preceding the German revolutions of 1848–49. Lighthouse often espoused radical political views and its steel-engraved illustrations satirized famous politicians, resulting in incessant persecutions by the police and forcing Keil to frequently change publishing locations: first to Zeitz, then Magdeburg, Halle, Dessau, Bremen and finally Braunschweig.

After the initial success of the March 1848 revolution, censorship loosened enough that Keil and his editorial staff were able to return to Leipzig. Lighthouse became a weekly and turned entirely on the side of the revolution. As reactionary forces gained the upper hand by late 1849, a wave of investigations and press trials began. The government censored the magazine in 1851, particularly because of a sharp-tongued supplement called Lantern, which Keil kept giving new names to escape the censors: German Reich-brake, Spitz balls, Wasp and eventually Sentinel.

Following the ban of Lighthouse, Keil began work for the Illustrated Dorfbarbier magazine published by his friend Ferdinand Stolle in Dresden. With Keil's involvement, the paper's circulation increased to 22,000. Finally in 1852 Keil's political problems caught up with him. After a trial he was condemned as State Criminal and sentenced to 9 months in prison in cell 74 at the Hubertusburg near Wermsdorf, of which he served 3 months.

While in prison, Keil first developed the idea for the publication which was to bring him fame and outlive him by many years. He envisioned an illustrated weekly that would provide "intellectual exercise and education as entertainment" and serve as a "people's encyclopedia" covering a wide range of interests. Each edition would contain features by famous writers, essays on German and foreign customs, articles on science and nature, a section on human health, and a feuilleton of non-political news, art, and literary criticism. In particular, he would direct these more subtle liberal ideals of enlightenment at the German middle and lower classes. Its development became the forerunner of the modern glossy print magazines we know today and one of the most influential publications of the 19th century.

== Die Gartenlaube ==
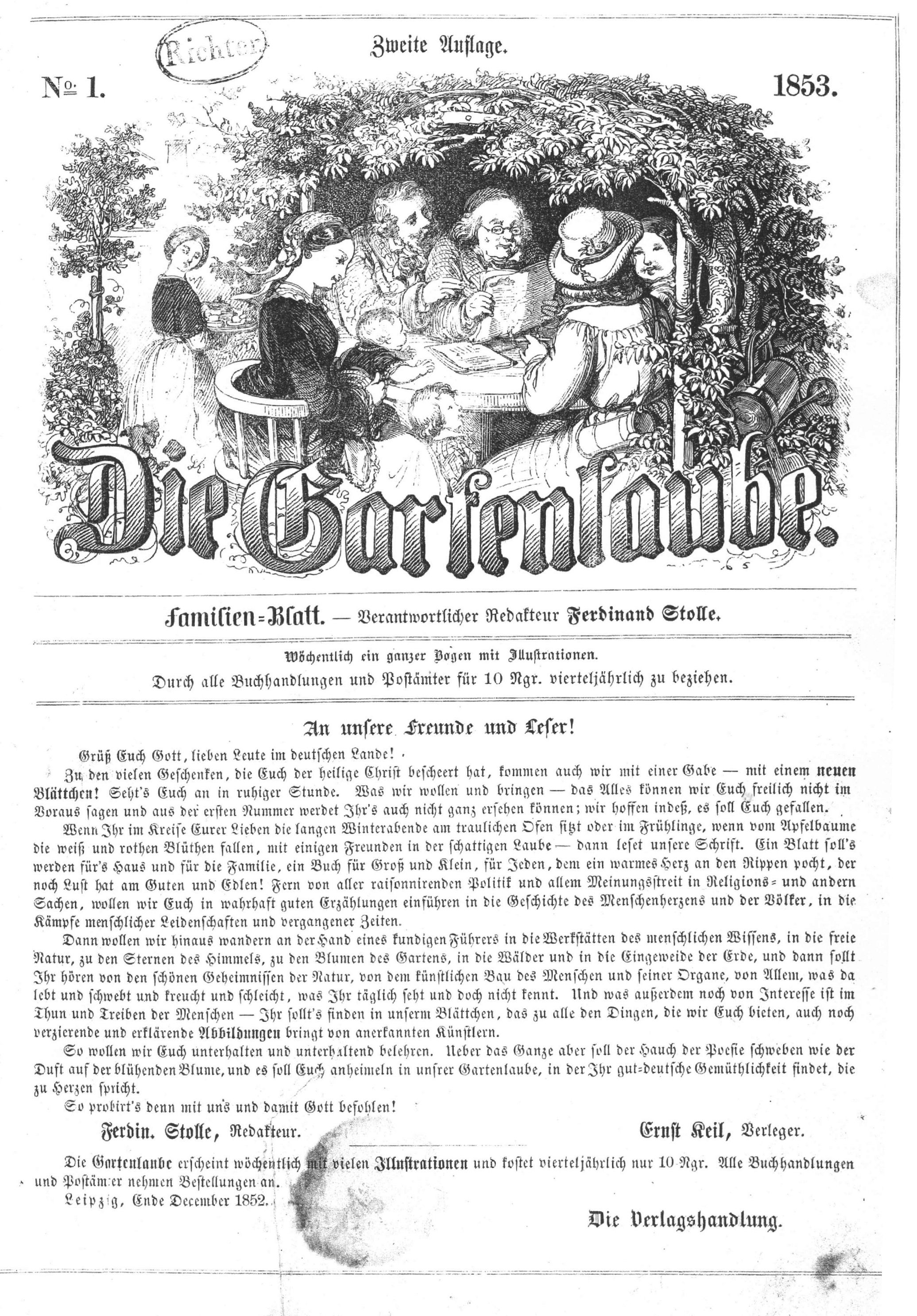
Front page of Die Gartenlaube, Volume 1 No. 1, 1853

On January 1, 1853, Keil published his new magazine under the inconspicuous title Die Gartenlaube, named after the gazebo in his garden in Leipzig. Initially he could not serve as editor because his press credentials had been revoked and he was still under police surveillance, so he borrowed the firm of Stolle & Diezmann for the first run of 5000 copies. His objective was to reach and enlighten the whole family, especially the German middle classes, through a carefully crafted mixture of current events, essays on the natural sciences, biographies, short stories, poetry, and full-page illustrations. The magazine's masthead depicted a grandfatherly figure reading to a family around a table.

During Keil's tenure, works by prominent German writers such as Goethe and Schiller dominated its pages and the company flourished rapidly. Over time he attracted known naturalists, scientists and technicians such as Karl Ernst Bock, Carl Vogt, Emil Adolf Rossmässler and Max Maria von Weber to his pages, turning the Gartenlaube into a major vehicle of popular science in Germany. In the literary field he employed Hermann Schmidt, Theodor Storm, Gottfried Keller, Levin Schücking and novelist Wilhelm Raabe, among others.

Circulation increased dramatically after Keil introduced serialized novels into the magazine, rising to 160,000 by 1863. By comparison, most daily newspapers of the period had a circulation of only 4,000. When Prussia occupied the Kingdom of Saxony during the Austro-Prussian War in 1866, publication of the magazine was banned. However, this measure was withdrawn a few weeks later at the request of Otto von Bismarck. After a two-week hiatus, it became the most widely read publication in Germany with a circulation of 177,000. Circulation reached 382,000 by 1875, and because Gartenlaube was common family reading with many public cafes taking delivery, estimates of actual readership run between two and five million. It was widely read across all the German states and could be found in German immigrant communities in the United States, German colonies, and the German-speaking communities of Latin America, especially Brazil. It kept this market supremacy for ten years after Keil's death in 1878, and at one time claimed to have the largest readership of any publication in the world.

== Later life ==
In 1871 Keil's only son Bruno died from diphtheria on a trip to Cairo. On January 1, 1878 Keil celebrated the company's 25th birthday with his employees. He died 3 months later after a short illness. The full extent of his financial support to the needy and philanthropy to education in the arts, crafts, and sciences only became known after his death.

== Legacy ==
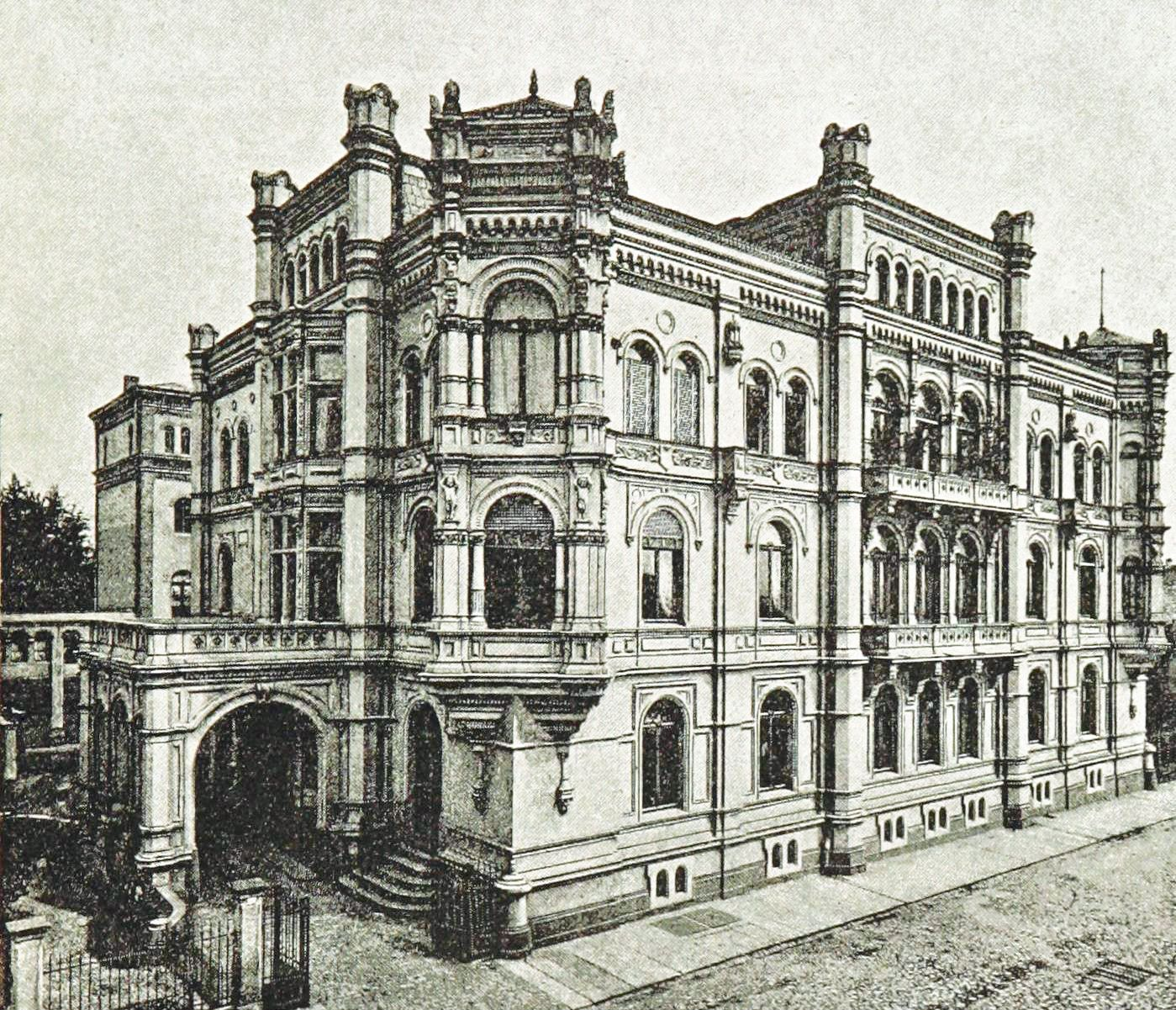
Villa Keil at Goldschmidtstraße 33 Leipzig. It was largely destroyed during World War II bombing.

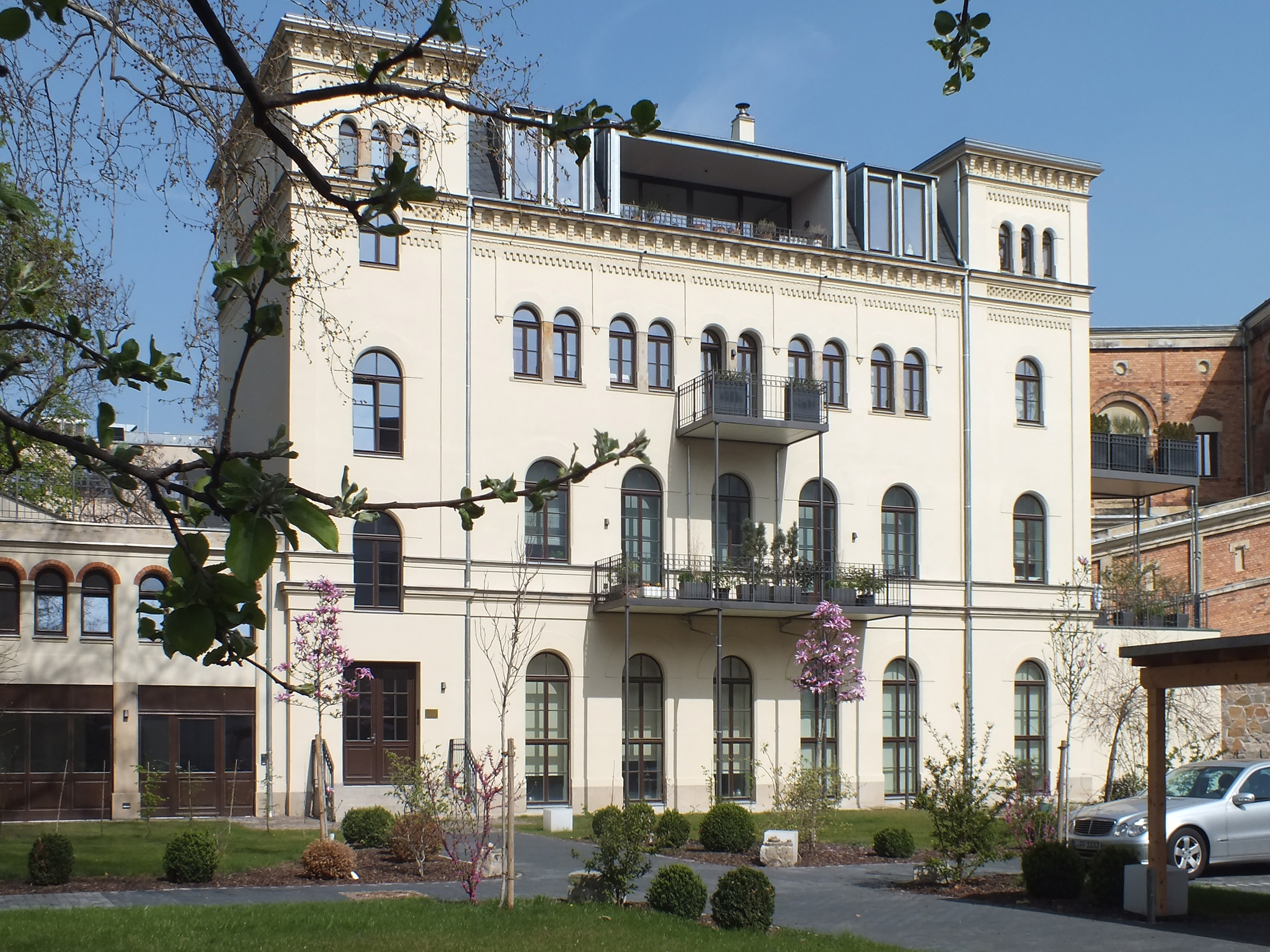
Former paper warehouse behind the historic Villa Keil at Talstraße 7, renovated in 2011

On the pages of Die Gartenlaube, Keil published countless articles on culture, politics, landscape, industry, technology, history, and other topics directed at all segments of German society. In the process the magazine became inextricably linked to Germany's complicated efforts to forge a national identity. Keil's publication was often contradictory: traditional and modern, liberal and fiercely nationalist, romanticized and enlightened. It thus served both as the public repository for German myths and ideals, as well as a primary source for new national images before, during and after German unification. As such it is a rich source of information for cultural historians and occupies "a special place in German press history."

Goethe was featured 75 times in print and 14 times in illustrations, and Schiller was featured 90 times in print and 15 times in illustrations. Among the other works published by Keil, Carl Ernst Bock's Book of Healthy and Ill Humans and the novels of E. Werner are the most notable. Publication of works by novelist E. Marlitt in serial form, such as Goldelse beginning in 1866, had a significant impact on Marlitt's celebrity.

His publishing business, which passed into the possession of the widow Keil after Ernst's death in 1878, was taken over at the end of 1883 by Kröner Brothers in Stuttgart. Parts of the book publishing business, including the works of Marlitt and Werner, were taken over by Union Deutsche Verlagsgesellschaft.

On July 21, 1921, a new street in the Lindenau district of western Leipzig was named for him: Ernst-Keil-Straße. It still exists today.

Ernst Keil's home in Leipzig, the Villa Keil, was built in 1861 after plans by architect Constantin Lipsius in the italianate style. Keil also set up his publishing firm on the site, at one time employing over 150 people and running 18 high-speed presses. The villa was severely damaged during the bombing of Leipzig in World War II and only 2 rear buildings remained. These were extensively renovated in 2011 by KSW-GmbH, resulting in 12 apartments at the corner of Goldschmidtstraße and Talstraße.

== Writings ==
=== Books and letters ===
- Melancholie, a romantic novel, 1845.
- War correspondent in the field in the German War of 1866 Bad Langensalza/Thuringia: Verlag Rockstuhl, 2016
- 9 letters from Ernst Keil to different recipients January 10, 1851 to August 30, 1875
- Klinghammer's Buchhandlung (Ernst Keil), 1877. IV. 1

=== Articles in Die Gartenlaube ===
- To our Friends and Readers. Issue 1, 1853
- Sefeloge. Issue 41, 1853
- Ludwig Bechstein. Issue 42, 1853
- Literarisches. Issue 43, 1853
- Literarisches. Issue 48, 1853
- Weihnachtsbücher. Issue 49, 1853
- Literatur und Kunst. Issue 50, 1853
- Literatur und Kunst. Issue 52, 1853
- Schweizer Angelegenheit. Issue 1, 1857
- Für Theodor Körner's Pflegerin. Issue 13, 14, 23, 1863
- Brief an eine Gläubige. Issue 42, 1866
- Eine literarische Freibeuterei. Issue 44, 1873
- Professor Dr. Carl Ernst Bock's obituary. Issue 10, 1874
- Heinrich Beta. Issue 17, 1876
- Aufforderung. Issue 8, 1878
