= Ex libris (bookplate) =

Label affixed to a book to indicate ownership

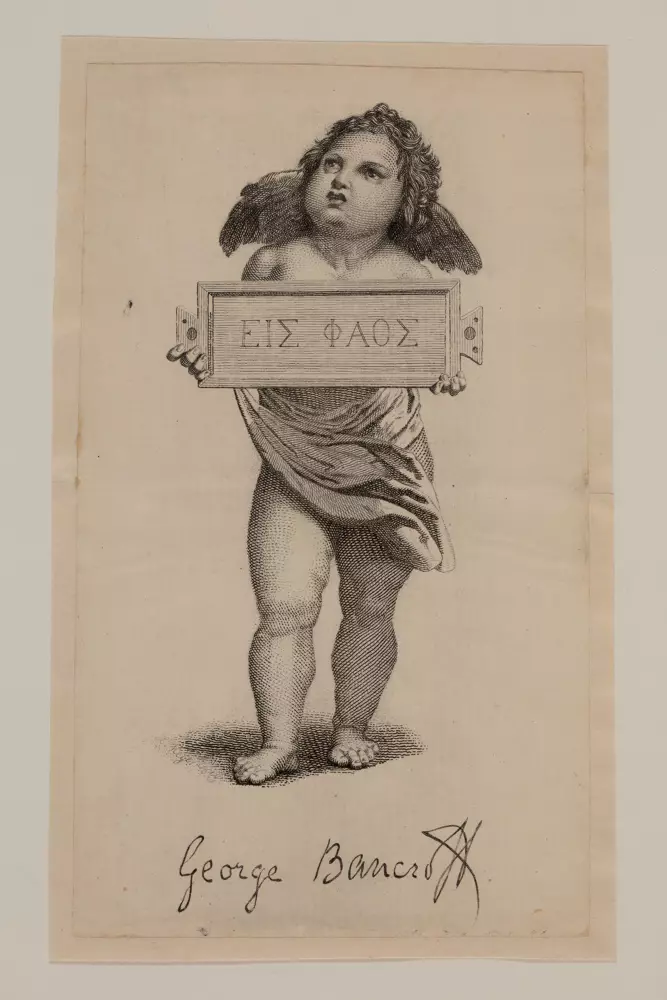
Bookplate for George Bancroft. Engraving of a cherub holding a tabula ansata with text Εἰς φάος in Ancient Greek, meaning "toward the light".

An ex libris (Latin for 'from the books of...'), also known as a bookplate (or book-plate, as it was commonly styled until the early 20th century), is a printed or decorative label pasted into a book, often on the front endpaper, to indicate ownership. Simple typographical bookplates are termed "book labels".

Bookplates often bear a motif relating to the book's owner, such as a coat-of-arms, crest, badge, motto, or a design commissioned from an artist or designer. The name of the owner usually follows an inscription such as "from the books of..." or "from the library of...", or in Latin, "ex libris". Bookplates are important evidence for the provenance of books.

The most traditional technique used to make bookplates is burin engraving. The engraved copper matrix is then printed with an intaglio press on paper, and the resulting print can be pasted into the book to indicate ownership.

In the United States, bookplates replaced book rhymes (which replaced book curses) after the 19th century.

== History ==
=== Early examples ===
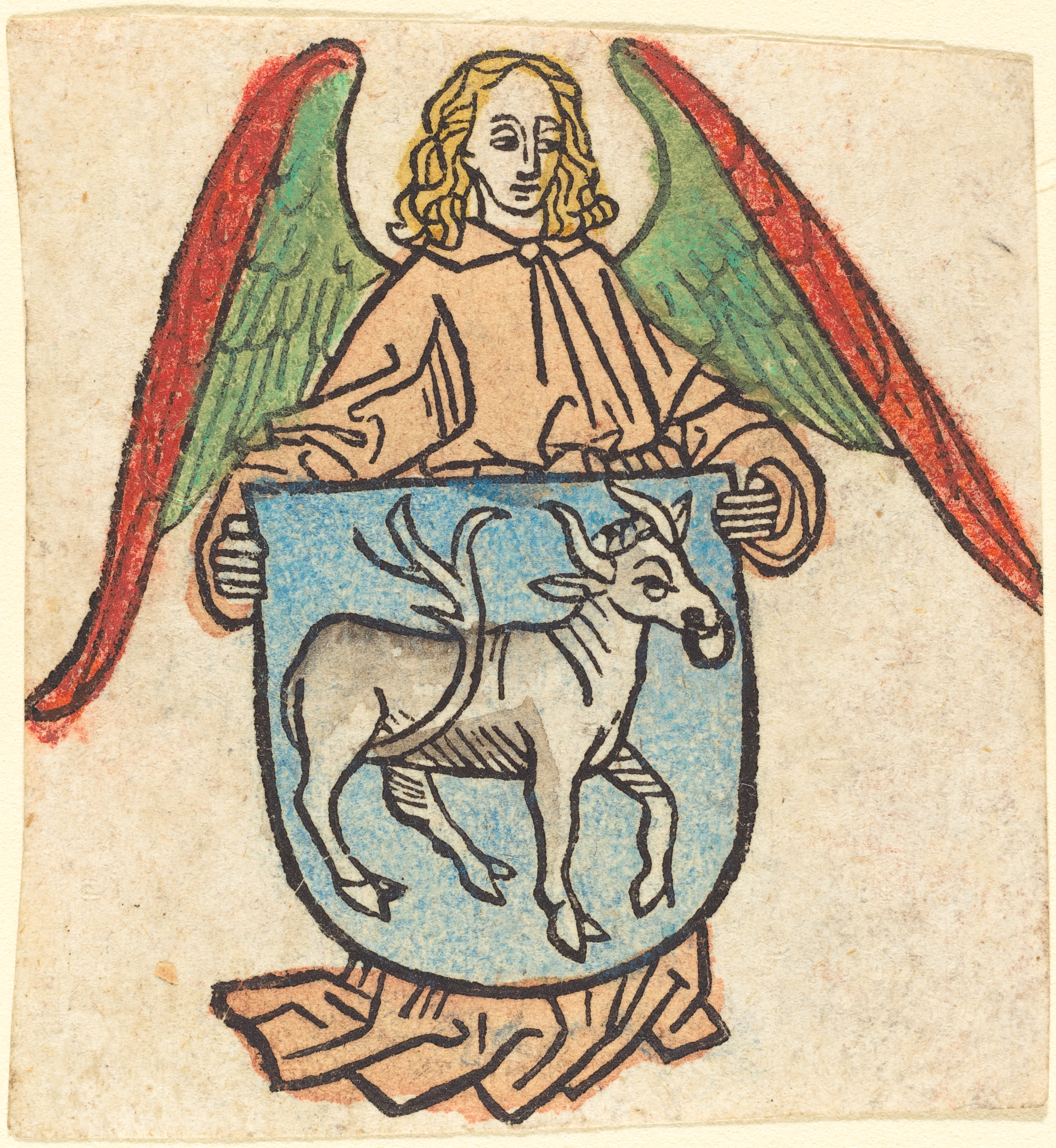
Bookplate for Hildebrand Brandenburg of Biberach, woodcut, black printing ink, and hand coloring on paper (Germany, 1475).

The earliest known marks of ownership of books or documents date from the reign of Amenophis III in Egypt (1391−1353 BCE).

However, in their modern form, they evolved from simple inscriptions in books which were common in Europe in the Middle Ages, when various other forms of "librarianship" became widespread (such as the use of class-marks, call numbers, or shelfmarks). The earliest known examples of printed bookplates are German, and date from the 15th century. One of the best known is a small hand-coloured woodcut representing a shield of arms supported by an angel, which was pasted into books presented to the Carthusian monastery of Buxheim by Brother Hildebrand Brandenburg of Biberach, about the year 1480—the date being fixed by that of the recorded gift. The woodcut, in imitation of similar devices in old manuscripts, is hand-painted. An example of this bookplate can be found in the Farber Archives of Brandeis University. In France the most ancient ex-libris as yet discovered is that of one Jean Bertaud de la Tour-Blanche, the date of which is 1529. Holland comes next with the plate of Anna van der Aa, in 1597; then Italy with one attributed to the year 1622. The earliest known American example is the plain printed label of Stephen Daye, the Massachusetts printer of the Bay Psalm Book, 1642.

The history of the bookplate as a symbolical and decorative print used to mark ownership of books begins in Germany. Bookplates are often of art historical interest. Albrecht Dürer is known to have engraved at least six copper plates (some quite large) between 1503 and 1516, and to have supplied designs for several others. Notable plates are ascribed to Lucas Cranach and to Hans Holbein, and to the so-called Little Masters (Masters of the small format—the Behams, Virgil Solis, Matthias Zundt, Jost Amman, Saldorfer, Georg Hupschmann and others). The influence of these draftsman over the decorative styles of Germany has been felt through subsequent centuries down to the present day, notwithstanding the invasion of successive Italian and French fashions during the 17th and 18th centuries, and the marked effort at originality of composition observable among modern designers. The ornate and elaborate German style does not seem to have affected neighbouring countries; but as it was undoubtedly from Germany that the fashion for ornamental bookplates spread, the history of German ex-libris remains relevant to all those who are interested in their development.

Printed ex-libris became common in France in the early 17th century. Until then, the more luxurious custom of blind- or gold-stamping a book's binding with a personal device had been more widespread: the supralibros. From the middle of the century, however, the ex-libris proper became quite popular; examples of that period are numerous and exhibit a complex design sensibility. The term "ex-libris", used as a noun (Exlibris (written in one word) in German) originated in France.

=== England ===
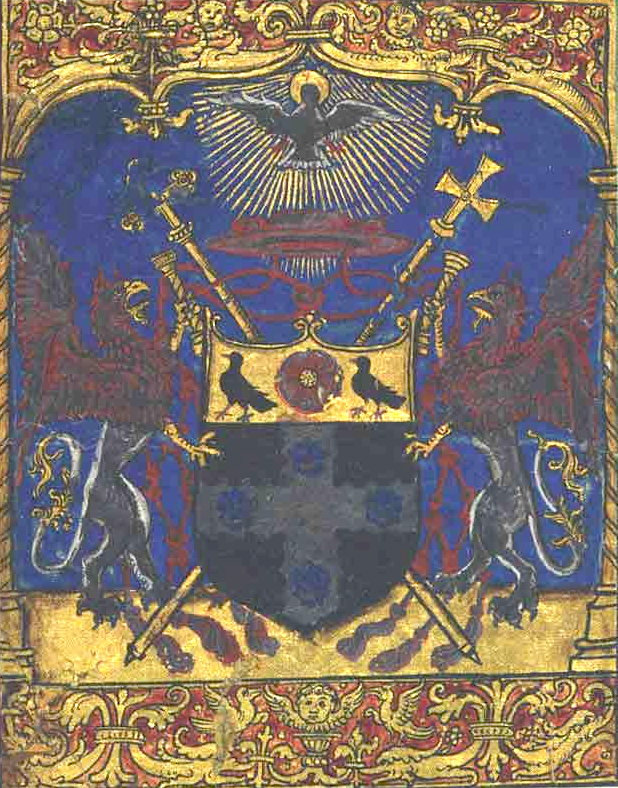
Hand-painted armorial device which belonged to Cardinal Wolsey, c. 1524.

The various styles of English bookplates from the Tudor period to the late Victorian period reflect the prevailing taste in decorative art at different epochs—as bookplates do in all countries. In 2010 John Blatchly asked whether the hand-painted armorial device attached to a folio of the first volume of Quatuor concilium generalium belonging to Cardinal Wolsey should be regarded as the first English bookplate. It is made of paper and was pasted onto the front pastedown of the book. However it was not printed. In this respect it is the only known example. The librarian David Pearson has argued that a plausible case can be made for regarding this as a kind of bookplate.

The earliest English bookplate appears to be the gift plate of Sir Nicholas Bacon; it adorns a book that once belonged to Henry VIII, and now is located in the King's library, British Museum. The next example is that of Sir Thomas Tresham, dated 1585. Until the last quarter of the 17th century the number of authentic English plates is very limited. Their composition is relatively simple compared to contemporary German examples. They are as a rule very plainly armorial, and the decoration is usually limited to a symmetrical arrangement of mantling, with an occasional display of palms or wreaths. Soon after the Restoration, however, the bookplate seems to have suddenly become an established accessory to most well-ordered libraries.

The first recorded use of the phrase book plate was in 1791 by John Ireland in Hogarth Illustrated. Bookplates of that period are very distinctive. In the simplicity of their heraldic arrangements they recall those of the previous age; but their appearance is totally different. First, they invariably display the tincture lines and dots, after the method originally devised in the middle of the century by Petra Sancta, the author of Tesserae Gentilitiae, which by this time had become adopted throughout Europe. Second, the mantling surrounding the face of the shield assumes a much more elaborate appearance which recalls that of the contemporary periwig. This style was undoubtedly imported from France, but it assumed a character of its own in England.

From then until the dawn of the French Revolution, English modes of decoration in bookplates generally followed French trends. The main characteristics of the style which prevailed during the Queen Anne and early Georgian periods are: ornamental frames suggestive of carved oak; a frequent use of fish-scales; trellis or diapered patterns, for the decoration of plain surfaces; and, in the armorial display, a marked reduction in the importance of the mantling. The introduction of the scallop-shell as an almost constant element of ornamentation gives a foretaste of the Rocaille-Coquille, the so-called Chippendale fashions of the next reign. During the middle third of the century this rococo style affects the bookplate as universally as all other decorative objects. Its chief element is a fanciful arrangement of scroll and shell work with curveing acanthus-like sprays—an arrangement which in the examples of the best period is generally made asymmetrical in order to give freer scope for a variety of countercurves. Straight or concentric lines and all appearances of flat surface are avoided; the helmet and its symmetrical mantling tends to disappear, and is replaced by the plain crest on a fillet. The earlier examples of this manner are generally simple. Later, however, the composition becomes exceedingly light and complicated; every conceivable and often incongruous element of decoration is introduced, from cupids to dragons, from flowerets to Chinese pagodas. During the early part of George III's reign there is a return to greater sobriety of ornamentation, and a style more truly national, which may be called the urn style, makes its appearance. Bookplates of this period exhibit an appearance which at once recalls the decorative manner made popular by architects and designers such as Chambers, the Adams, Josiah Wedgwood, Hepplewhite and Sheraton. The shield shows a plain spade-like outline, manifestly based upon that of the pseudo-classic urn then very alive. The ornamental accessories are symmetrical palms and sprays, wreaths and ribands. The architectural boss is also an important factor. In many plates, indeed, the shield of arms takes quite a subsidiary position by the side of the predominantly architectural urn.

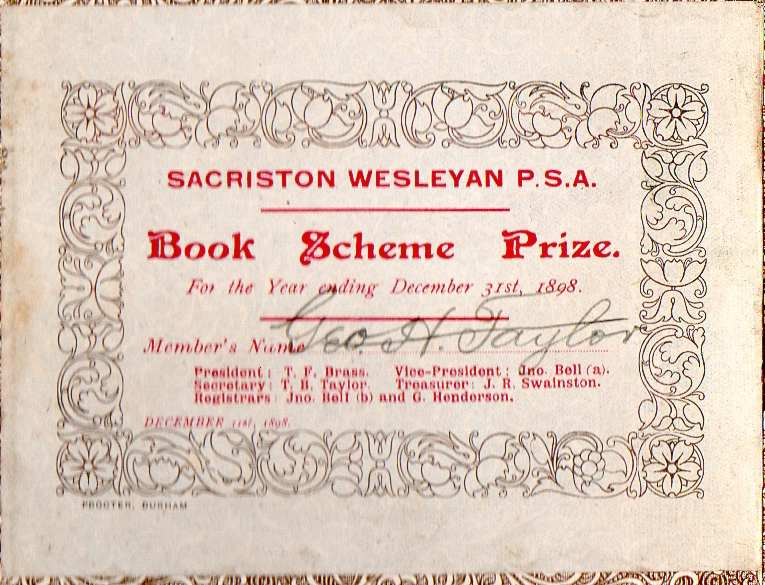
Bookplate awarded as a Sunday School prize for 1898.

Some bookplates were issued by institutions, often religious ones, which awarded books to individuals to recognise achievements such as academic performance and good behaviour. These would be inscribed with the name of the individual by hand. Such plates could be very elaborate, or very simple in their design, reflecting the character of the awarding institution.

From the beginning of the 19th century, no special style of decoration seems to have established itself. The immense majority of examples display a plain shield of arms with motto on a scroll, and crest on a fillet. At the turn of the 20th century, however, bookplate design diversified and flourished beyond traditional armorials.

The main styles of decoration have already been noted. But certain styles of composition were also prevalent at certain periods. Although the majority of the older plates were armorial, there were always pictorial examples as well, and these are the quasi-totality of modern ones.

Of this kind the best-defined English genre may be recalled: the library interior—a term which explains itself—and book-piles, exemplified by the ex-libris of W. Hewer, Samuel Pepys's secretary. We have also many portrait-plates, of which, perhaps, the most notable are those of Samuel Pepys himself and of John Gibbs, the architect; allegories, such as were engraved by Hogarth, Bartolozzi, John Pine and George Vertue; landscape-plates by wood-engravers of the Bewick school, etc. In most of these the armorial element merely plays a secondary part.

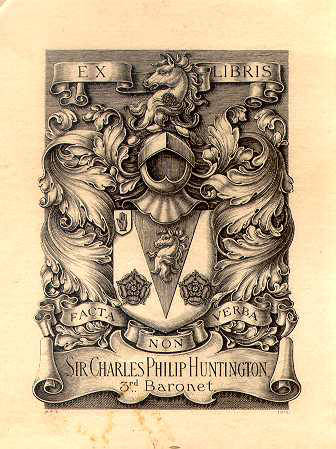
Bookplate of Sir Charles Philip Huntington, 1912

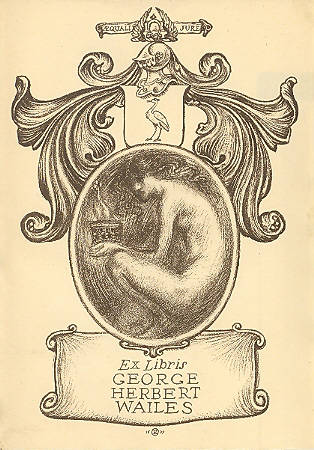
1899 bookplate

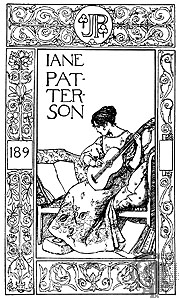
Bookplate of Jane Patterson, 1890s

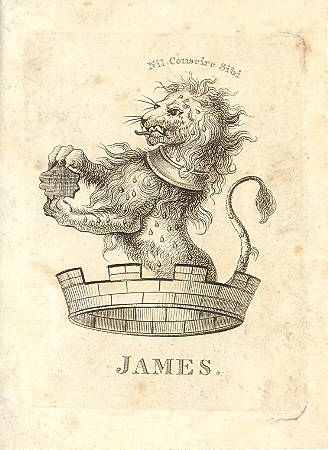
1810 British bookplate

== Art ==
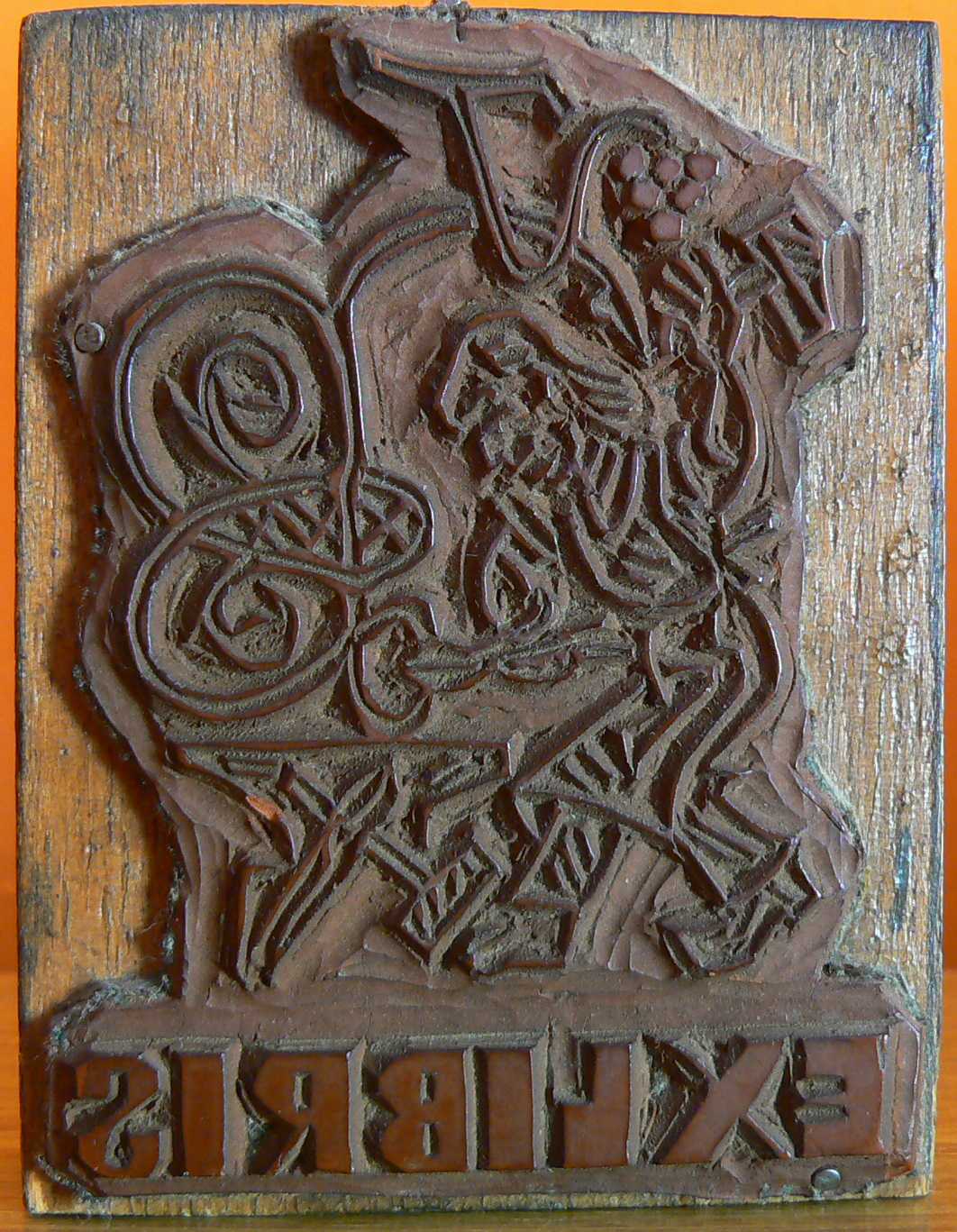
Ex-libris of Hungary bookplate stamp

Until the 19th century, the devising of bookplates was generally left to the routine skill of the heraldic-stationery salesman. Near the turn of the 20th century, the composition of personal book tokens became recognized as a minor branch of a higher art, and there has come into fashion an entirely new class of designs which draw on older styles. Broadly speaking, it may be said that the purely heraldic element tends to become subsidiary and the allegorical or symbolic to assert itself more strongly.

Among early 20th-century English artists who have more specially paid attention to the devising of bookplates, may be mentioned C. W. Sherborn, G. W. Eve, Robert Anning Bell, J. D. Batten, Erat Harrison, J. Forbes Nixon, Charles Ricketts, John Vinycomb, John Leighton and Warrington Hogg and Frank C. Papé. The development in various directions of process work, by facilitating and cheapening the reproduction of beautiful and elaborate designs, has no doubt helped much to popularize the bookplate — a thing which in older days was almost invariably restricted to ancestral libraries or to collections otherwise important. Thus the great majority of plates of the period 1880–1920 plates were reproduced by process. Some artists continued to work with the graver. Some of the work they produce challenges comparison with the finest productions of bygone engravers. Of these the best-known are C. W. Sherborn (see Plate) and G. W. Eve in England, and in America J. W. Spenceley of Boston, Mass., K. W. F. Hopson of New Haven, Conn., and E. D. French of New York City.

== Study and collection ==
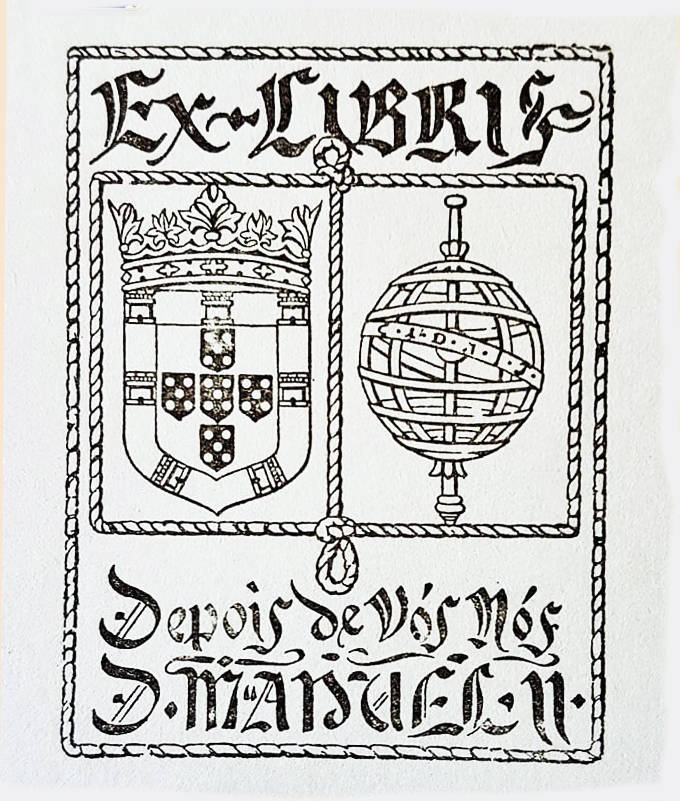
Ex libris of king Manuel II of Portugal (Note: The phrase below in Portuguese, meaning "After you, we", was the personal motto of Manuel.), given not only his position but also the fact that he was the last king of Portugal, it's an example of a high valued bookplate.

Bookplates are of interest to collectors either as specimens of bygone decorative fashion or as personal relics of well-known people, and can command high prices. However the value attached to book plates, otherwise than as an object of purely personal interest, is comparatively modern.

The study and collection of bookplates dates back to around 1860. The first real impetus was given by the appearance of A Guide to the Study of Book-Plates (Ex-Libris), by Lord de Tabley (then the Honorable J. Leicester Warren M.A.) in 1880. This work established what is now accepted as the general classification of styles of British ex-libris: early armorial (i.e., previous to Restoration, exemplified by the Nicholas Bacon plate); Jacobean, a somewhat misleading term, but distinctly understood to include the heavy decorative manner of the Restoration, Queen Anne and early Georgian days (the Lansanor plate is Jacobean); Chippendale (the style above described as rococo, tolerably well represented by the French plate of Convers); wreath and ribbon, belonging to the period described as that of the urn, etc. Since then the literature on the subject has grown considerably.

Societies of collectors were founded, first in England in 1891, then in Germany and France, and later in the United States, most of them issuing a journal or archives: The Journal of the Ex-libris Society (London), the Archives de la Société française de collectionneurs d'ex-libris (Paris), both of these monthlies; the Ex-libris Zeitschrift (Berlin), a quarterly.

In 1901–1903, the British Museum published the catalog of the 35,000 bookplates collected by Sir Augustus Wollaston Franks (1826–97).

One of the first known English collectors was Maria Jenkins of Clifton, Bristol, who was active in the field during the second quarter of the 19th century. Her bookplates were later incorporated into the collection of Joseph Jackson Howard.

Some collectors attempt to acquire plates of all kinds (for example, the collection of Irene Dwen Andrews Pace, now at Yale University, comprising 250,000 items). Other collectors prefer to concentrate on bookplates in special fields—for example, coats of arms, pictures of ships, erotic plates, chess pieces, legal symbols, scientific instruments, signed plates, proof-plates, dated plates, plates of celebrities, or designs by certain artists.

== Contemporary bookplates and their collection ==
Since the 1950s, there has been renewed and reoriented interest in bookplate collecting. A substantial number of collectors continue to study bookplates for their historical, artistic and socio-cultural interest across five centuries. Alongside them, a now-dominant group of collectors focuses on assembling personalized art-print collections at relatively modest cost. These collectors commission numbered and signed bookplate editions bearing their name, which are used for exchange rather than affixed to books.

More than 50 "national" societies of ex-libris collectors exist, grouped into an International Federation of Ex-libris Societies (FISAE) which organizes worldwide congresses every two years.

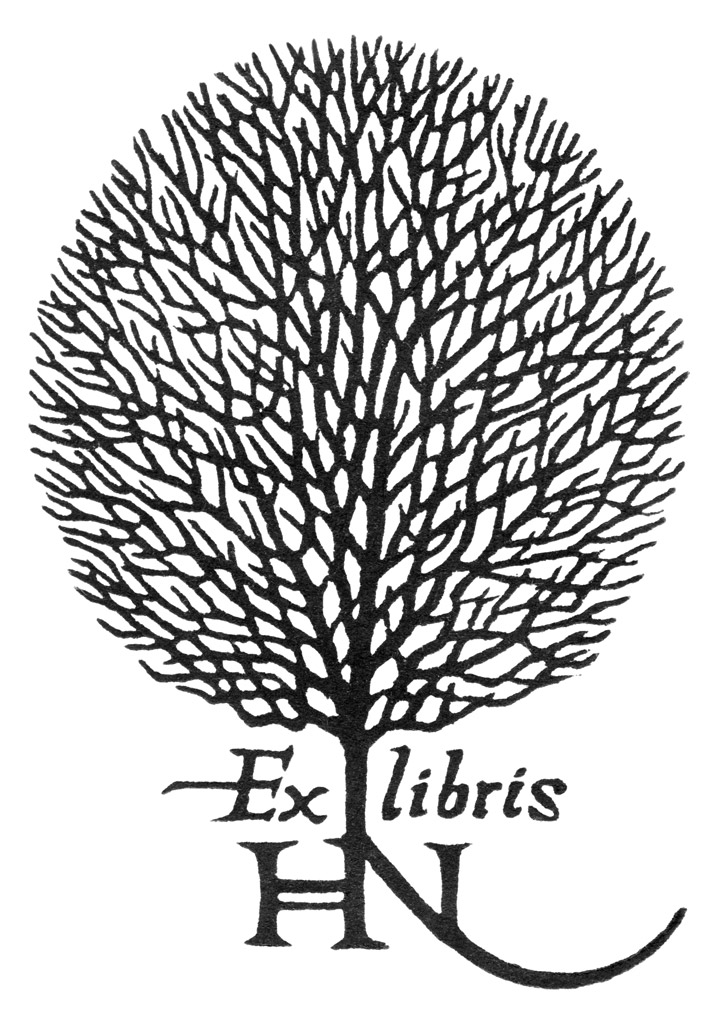
Jacques Hnizdovsky's own bookplate, 1972

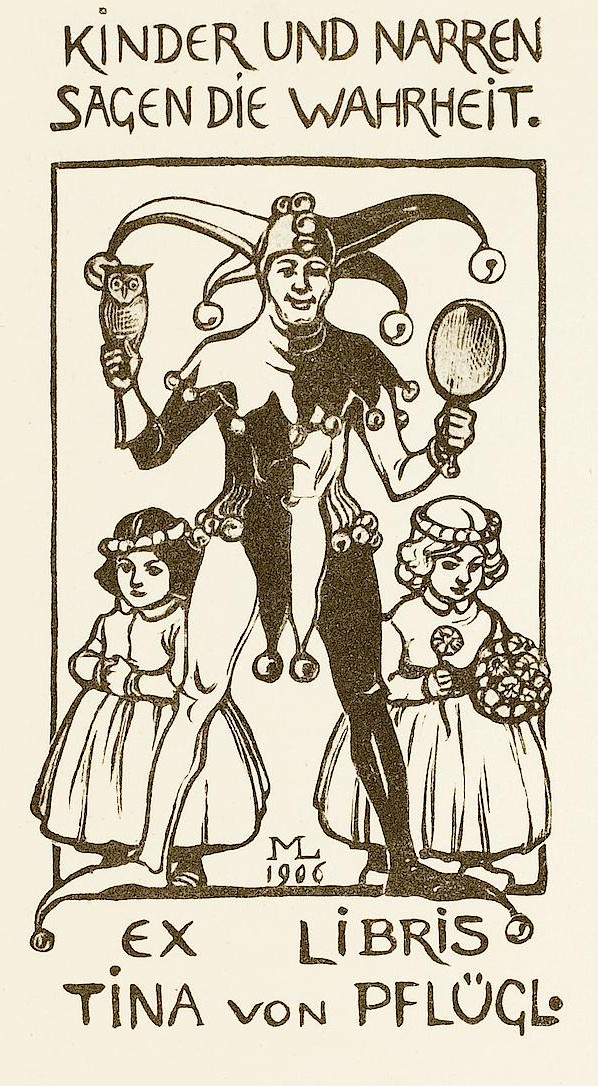
Maximilian Liebenwein's bookplate

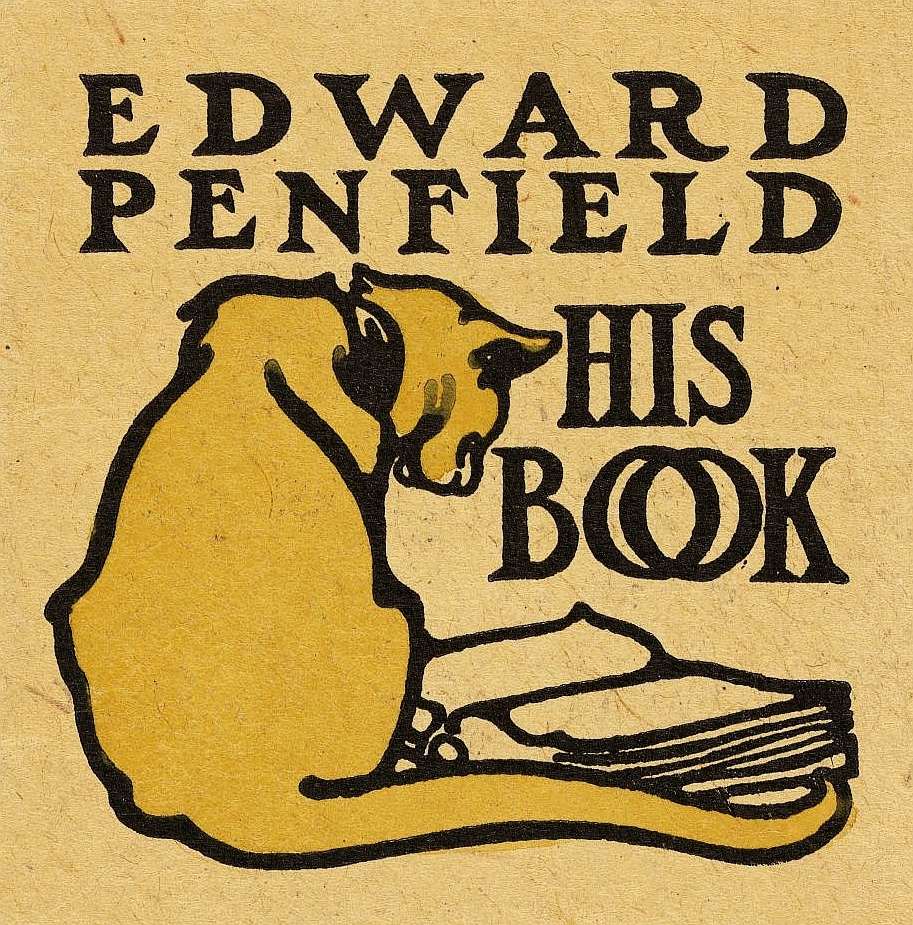
Edward Penfield's bookplate

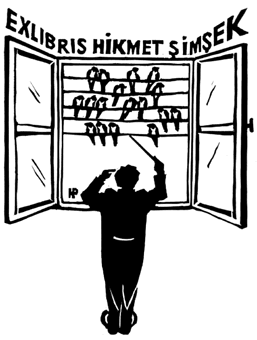
Bookplate of Hikmet Şimşek by Hasip Pektas, author of a book on bookplates

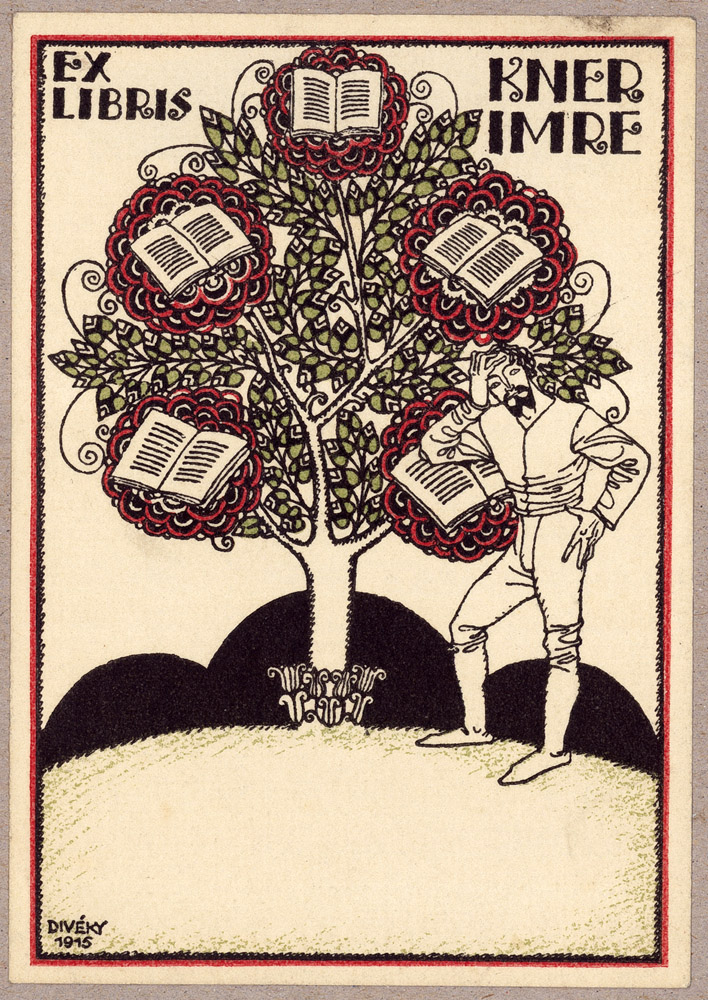

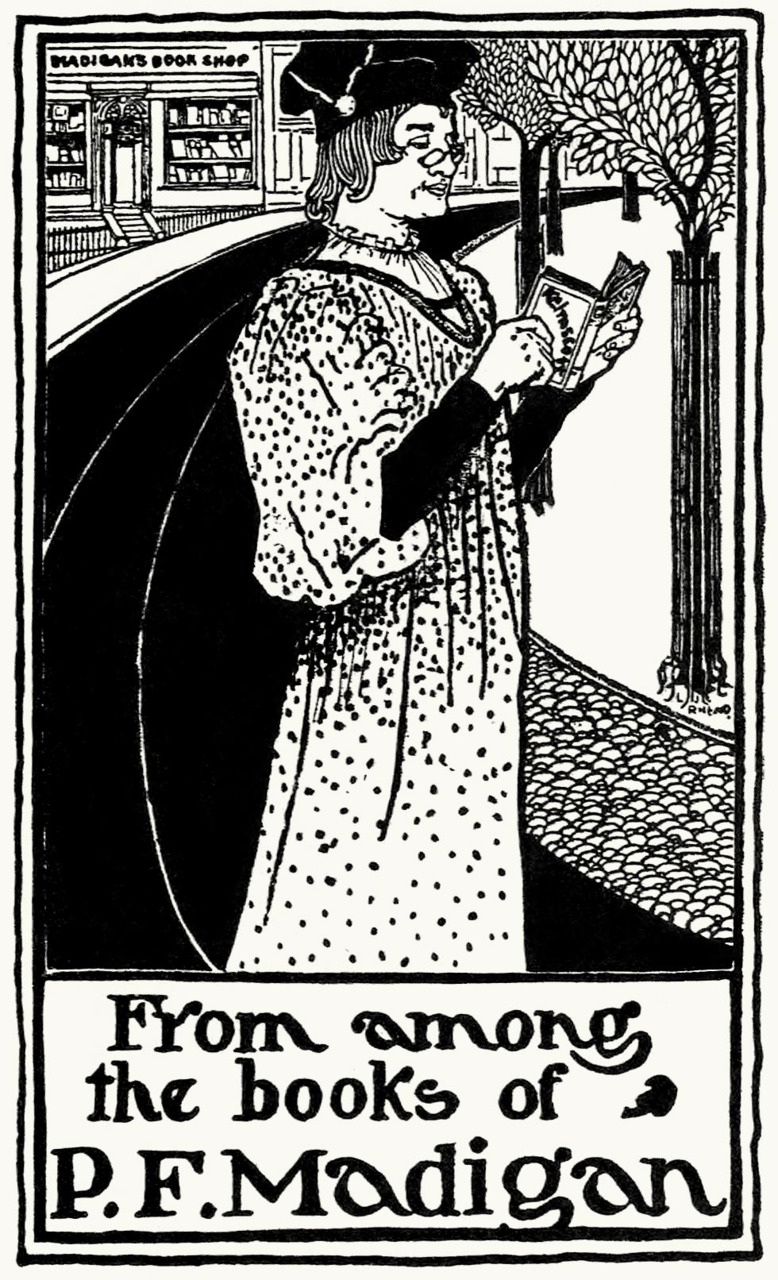

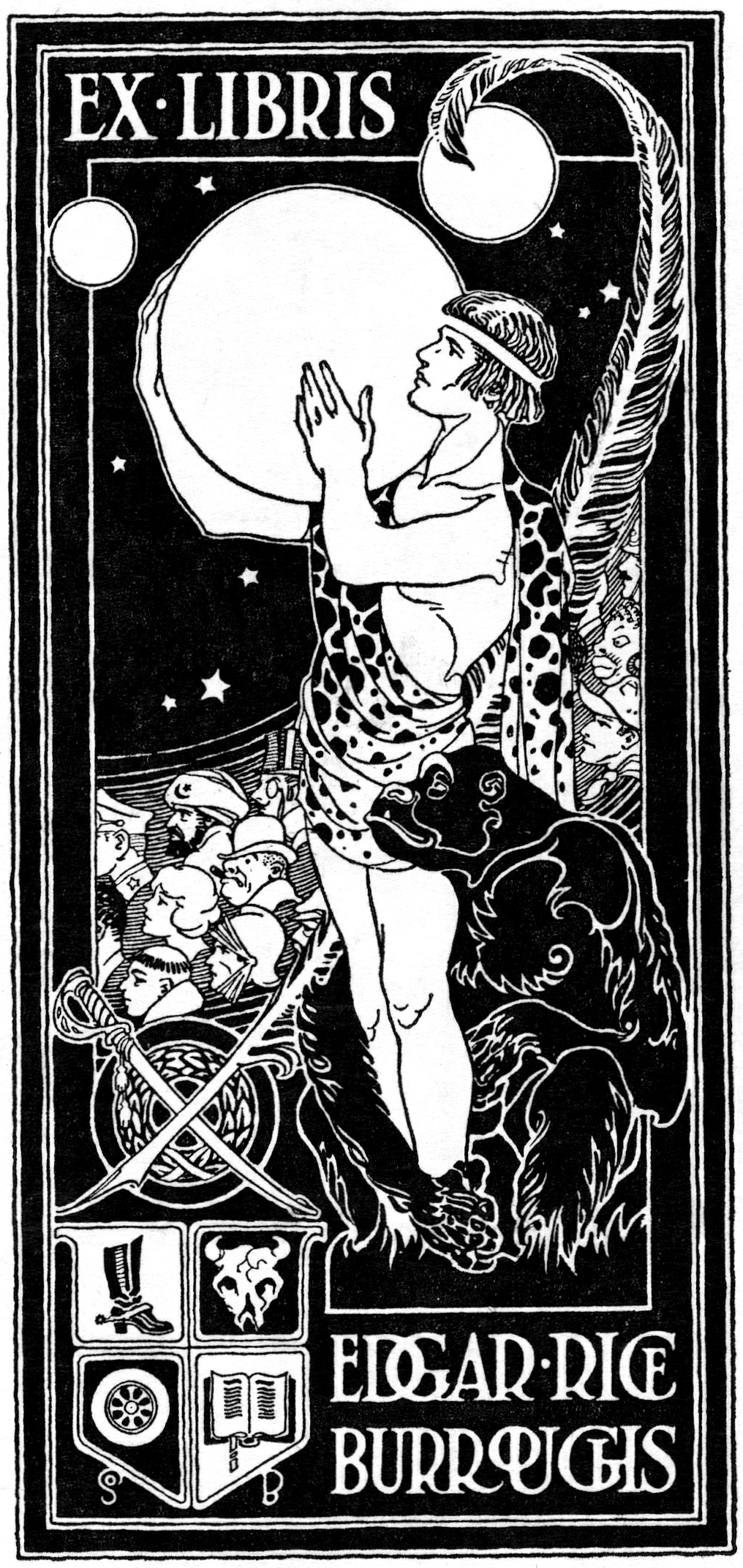
Bookplate of Edgar Rice Burroughs

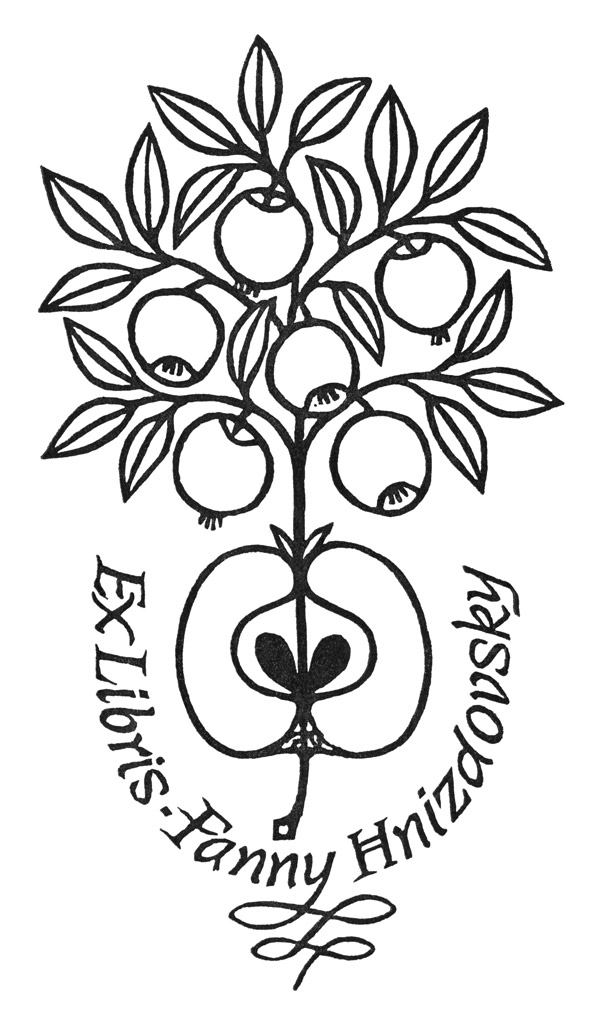
Bookplate designed by artist Jacques Hnizdovsky for his wife Stephanie

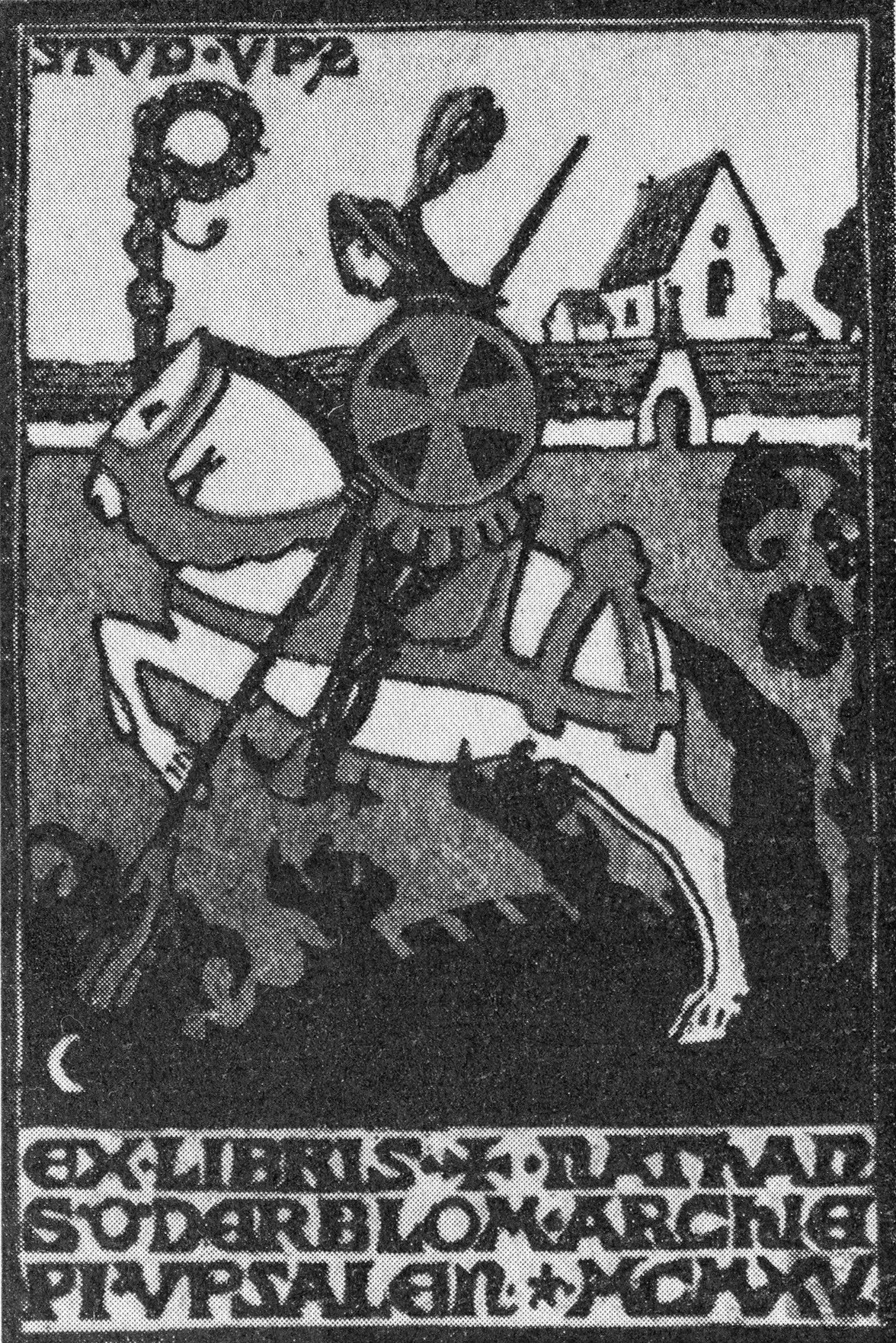

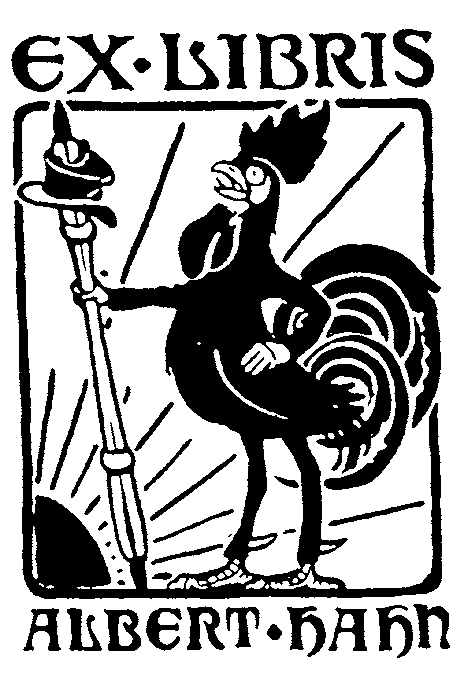
Bookplate of Albert Hahn

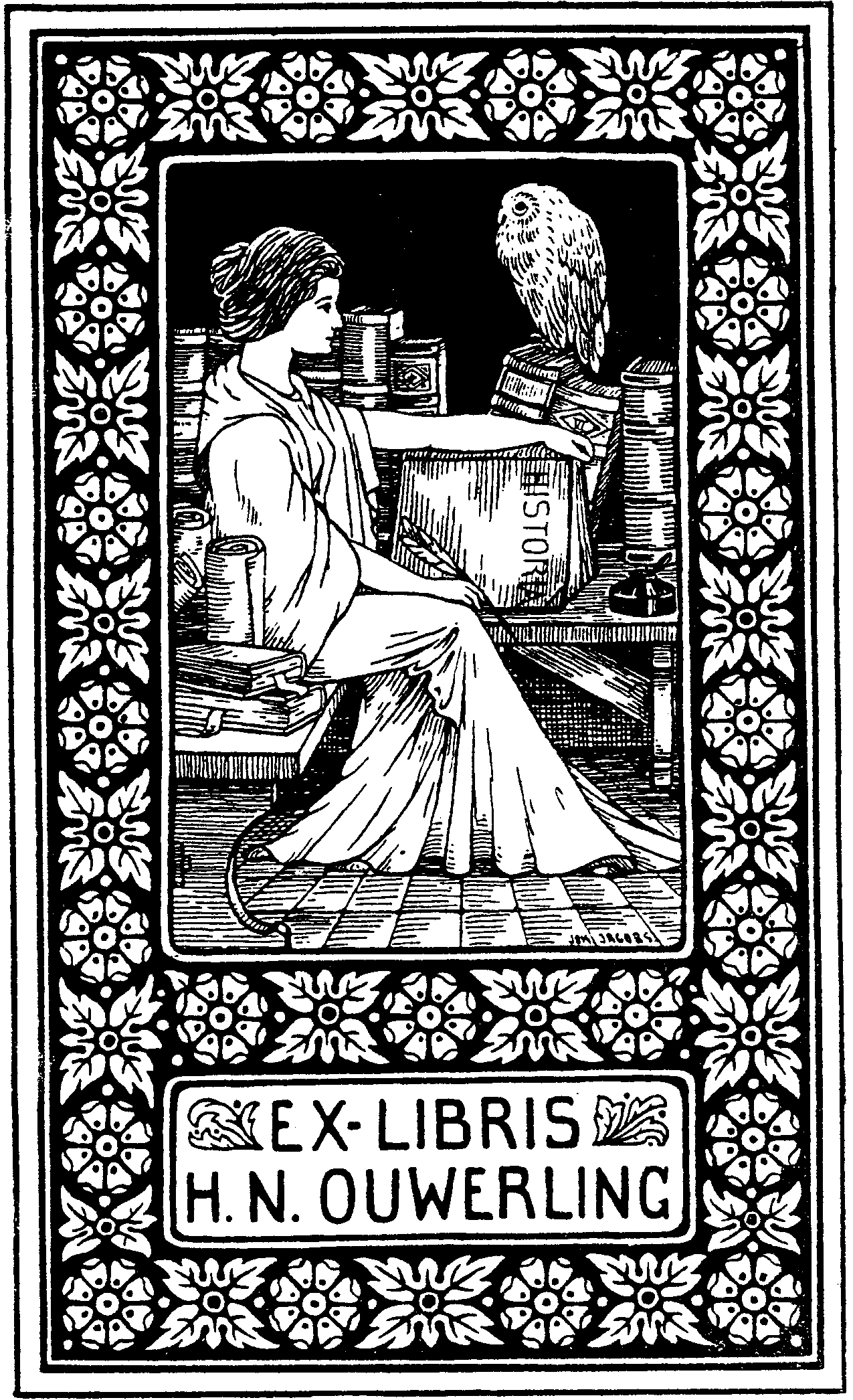

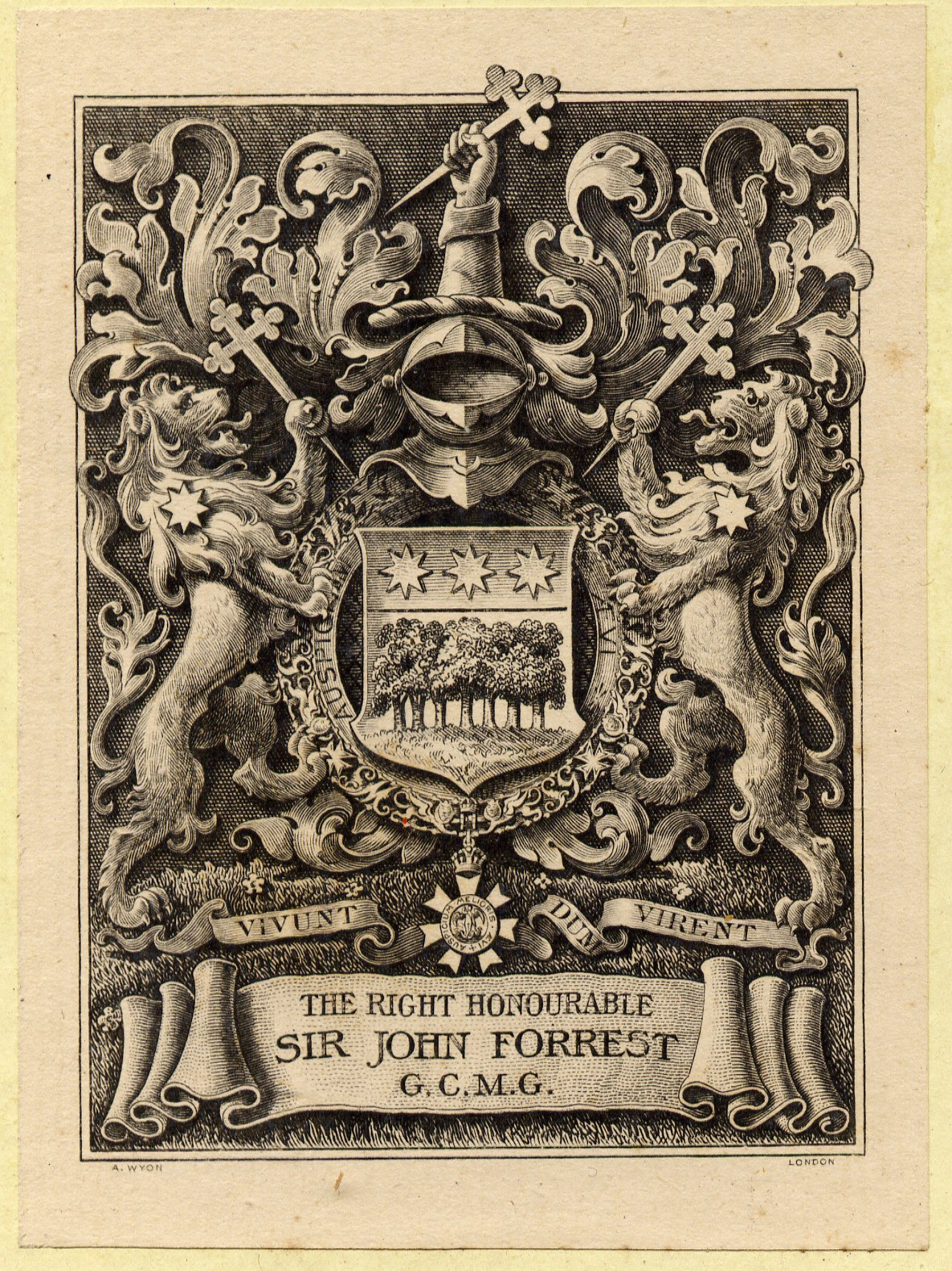

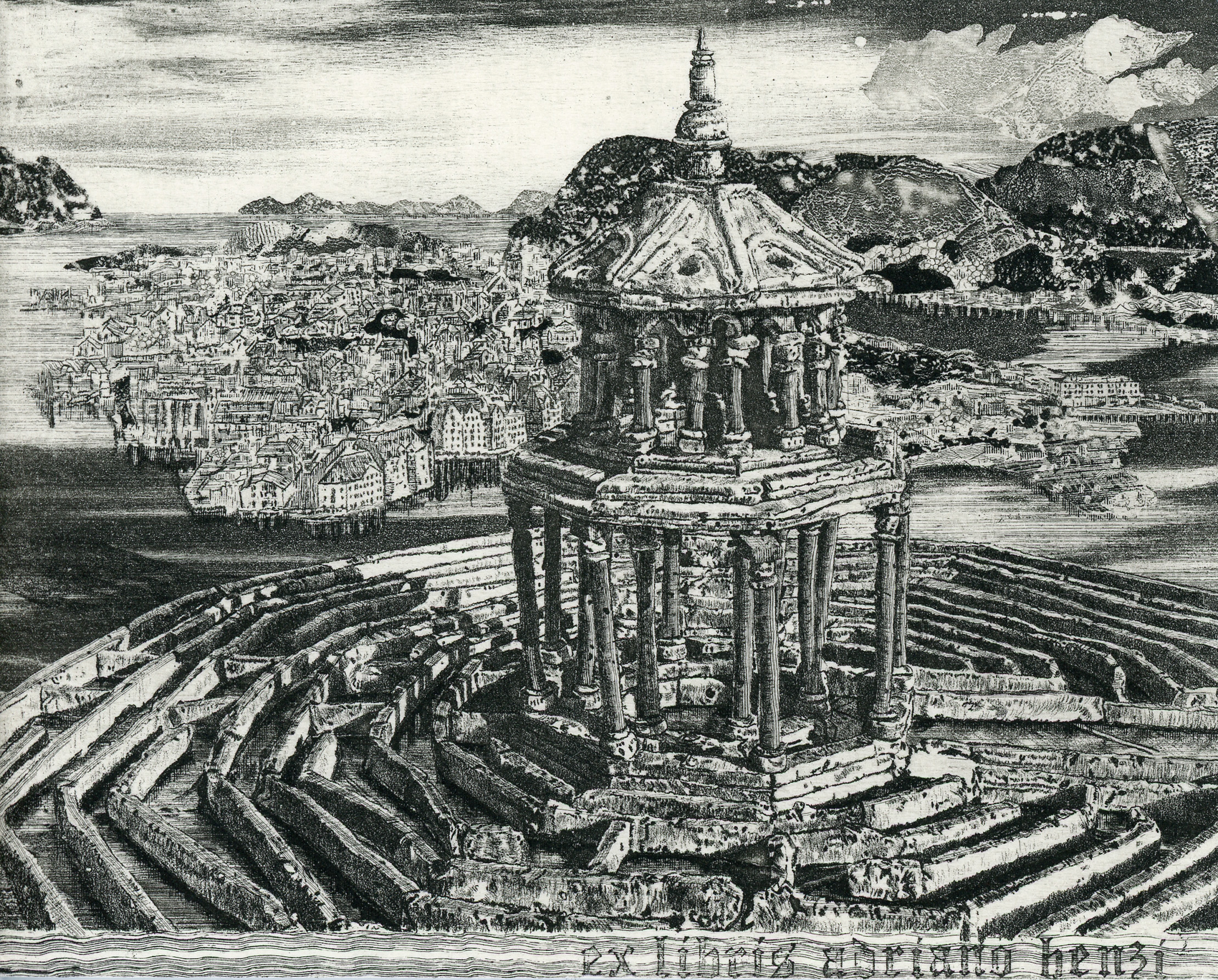

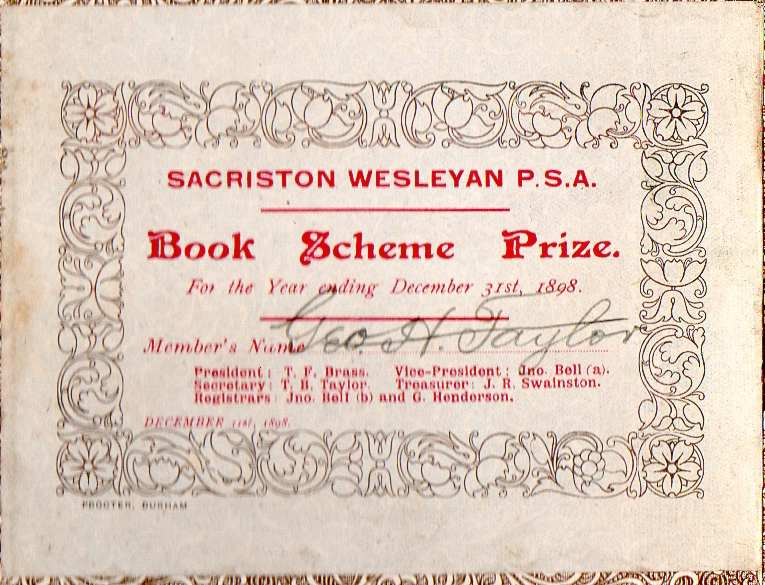

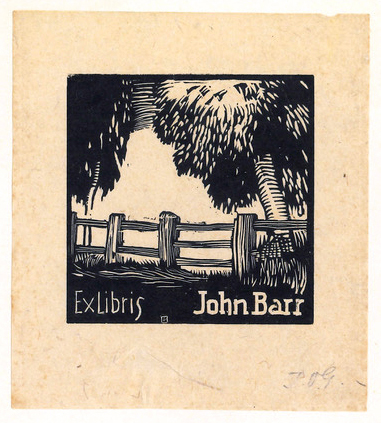
Ex Libris John Barr by Thomas Gulliver

== See also ==
- Book collecting
- Lithograph
- Library classification
- Printer's mark
- Title page
- Book frontispiece
- RFID
- Percy Neville Barnett, Australian bookplate collector
- Irena Sibley, contemporary Australian bookplate artist
