= Carl Bock =

Carl or Karl Bock may refer to:

- Carl Bock (explorer) (1849–1932), Norwegian explorer
- Carl Ernst Bock (1809–1874), German physician and anatomist
- Karl Bock (officer) (1899–1943), Wehrmacht officer
