= Percy Neville Barnett =

Australian bookplate scholar

Percy Neville Barnett (13 September 1881 – 1953) was an Australian collector of and authority on bookplates. Barnett is best known for his promotional role during the 1920s and 1930s when bookplates enjoyed a resurgence of interest in Australasia, Europe, and the United States. He wrote, designed and privately published more than twenty limited-edition books.

== Early life ==
Barnett was born on 13 September 1881 to Neville Barnett and his wife Mary Constance Isabel, in Christchurch, New Zealand. The family moved to Sydney in 1887 when Barnett's Anglican father was appointed organist at St. Mary's Cathedral. After finishing high school, Barnett worked at the Bank of New South Wales in Sydney. In 1918, he married Gabrielle Joyce Havelock Vidal, and it was around this time that his interest in book collecting and the scholarship of bookplates began.

== Career ==
Barnett spent much of his life documenting the bookplate movement in Australia through his own publications. His books are rare as there were only limited copies available due to the high level of detail and craftsmanship put into each publication. Each book was often issued in both standard editions and small deluxe genuine colour-prints, each selected carefully and pasted by hand by Barnett himself. Barnett took great care in each publication, researching and collecting for up to nine of ten years for his most major works.

Through both his personal collection and publications Barnett traced the subtle progress of the Australian bookplate tradition by analyzing their formal and stylistic development historically and aesthetically. Although they had been present in Australia from the very first days of European settlement, bookplates remained an expensive and exclusive item reserved only for the literati, missionaries, military officers, government officials and the occasional landed gentlemen. Up until the mid-1800s convicts in Australia accounted for about one third of the population; with low literacy levels in the British colonies, bookplates were reserved only for people who possessed personal libraries.

Referring to Australia's slow start to the bookplate tradition, Barnett stated:

From all indications exactly such a course with ex libris was being re-enacted in Australia as had been the case in England. Enjoying a moderate popularity with a few people interested in the subject, they were such as to appear neither widely nor for long, and would have remained a fad with few adherents.

— Percy Neville Barnett, Woodcut Book-plates

In 1923 Barnett was becoming involved in the conception and formation of an Australian Bookplate Society. Prior to this Barnett had relied upon correspondence with European societies, clubs and individuals in keeping up to date with bookplate tradition. Barnett himself claimed that:

Unlike the earlier societies elsewhere, the Society was not formed primarily because of the interest in bookplates already in existence, but rather in an endeavor to create an atmosphere favorable to their production...this could not have been achieved if there were not some exceptional artists, capable of designing the bookplates, to back up the movement.

— Percy Neville Barnett, The Bookplate in Australia: its Inspiration and Development

With the idea of creating a bookplate society still in progress, the first public exhibition of bookplates in Tyrell's Galleries in Sydney took place on 18 May 1923. Artists and collectors came together to promote and enjoy bookplates and bookplate design, giving impetus to the official formation of the Australian Ex Libris Society with fifty foundation members. Barnett's dedication resulted in his positions as Honorary Secretary of the Australian Ex Libris Society, vice-president of the New Zealand Ex Libris Society and of the Book-plate Association International, Los Angeles. From 1931 to 1937 he was general secretary of the Australian Painter-Etchers' Society.

== Influence ==
Barnett witnessed the peak of the Australian Ex Libris movement of the 1920s and 1930s. In that time, thousands of individual bookplates were designed, and the concept of bookplates developed an Australian character. Following Barnett's success and involvement in the founding of the Australian Ex Libris Society, rival bookplate societies were established to better serve and support the growing needs of artists and collectors.

Acknowledged for encouraging Australian artists to design bookplates, two of his most prominent inductions to the art of bookplate design were Lionel Lindsay and Pixie O'Harris. He encouraged artists and designers as a way of obtaining original and rare designs for his limited-edition books and personal collections. O'Harris, referring to the period between 1921 and 1922 recalled "About this time I became interested, through Percy Neville Barnett, in drawing bookplates…he encouraged me in this art."

Barnett also convinced artist Sydney Long, who had not produced a bookplate since 1921, to etch one as the frontispiece to Pictorial Book-plates (1931). It depicted a close copy of his iconic 1897 art nouveau oil painting The Spirit of the Plains. Encouraging the local industry, Barnett also directed substantial work toward the local book-plate designers. Commissioning Adrian Feint and George David Perrottet to design plates which were to be gifts to the Prince of Wales and Princess Elizabeth, and which would also be included in his Woodcut Book-plates (1934). The following year he also commissioned Feint and Perrottet to execute royal designs, this time for King George V and Queen Mary. Through efforts in commissions and promotion Barnett made a position for himself as an intermediary between prospective owners and artists.

== Publications ==
- The Bookplate in Australia : its inspiration and development. Sydney : Tyrrell's Galleries, 1930.
- Pictorial Book-plates : their origin and use in Australia. Sydney : Beacon Press, 1931.
- Armorial Book-plates : their romantic origin and artistic development. Sydney : Privately printed, 1932.
- Souvenir of "Armorial Book-plates". Sydney : Beacon Press, 1932.
- Japanese Colour-prints. Sydney : Privately printed by Beacon Press, 1936.
- Hiroshige. Sydney : Privately printed, 1938.
- De luxe publications. Sydney : Privately printed by Beacon Press, 1939.
- Australian Book-plates and Book-plates of interest to Australia. Sydney : Privately printed, 1950.
- Fun with Book-plates. Sydney : Privately printed, 1951.
