= Book rhyme =

Short poem or rhyme

A book rhyme is a short poem or rhyme that was formerly printed inside the front of a book or on the flyleaf to discourage theft (similar to a book curse) or to indicate ownership.

Book rhymes were fairly common in the United States during the 18th and 19th centuries, but the printing of bookplates pushed them out of use.

== Anti-theft warnings ==
One of the most common is:

If this book you steal away,
What will you say
On Judgment Day?

== Identification rhyme ==
An example of a common style of identification rhyme is:

Everytown is my dwelling-place
America is my nation
John Smith is my name

The end line has several variations:

And Christ is my salvation
And heaven my expectation

An example of an identification rhyme found in James Joyce's A Portrait of the Artist as a Young Man (1916) is:

Stephen Dedalus is my name,
Ireland is my nation.
Clongowes is my dwellingplace.
And heaven my expectation.

The title of Thornton Wilder's novel Heaven's My Destination (1935) and Alfred Bester's novel The Stars My Destination (1956) play on the final line.

A typical example of an identification book rhyme features prominently in M.R. James' 1925 ghost story A Warning to the Curious:

Nathaniel Ager is my name and England is my nation,
Seaburgh is my dwelling-place and Christ is my salvation,
When I am dead and in my Grave, and all my bones are rotton,
I hope the Lord will think on me when I am long forgotton.

== Sources ==
- Leach, Maria; Fried, Jerome (1972). Funk & Wagnall's Standard Dictionary of Folklore, Mythology & Legend (hardcover). Funk & Wagnalls. pp. 156–57. ISBN 0-308-40090-9..
