= Christian Bregazzi =

German photographer

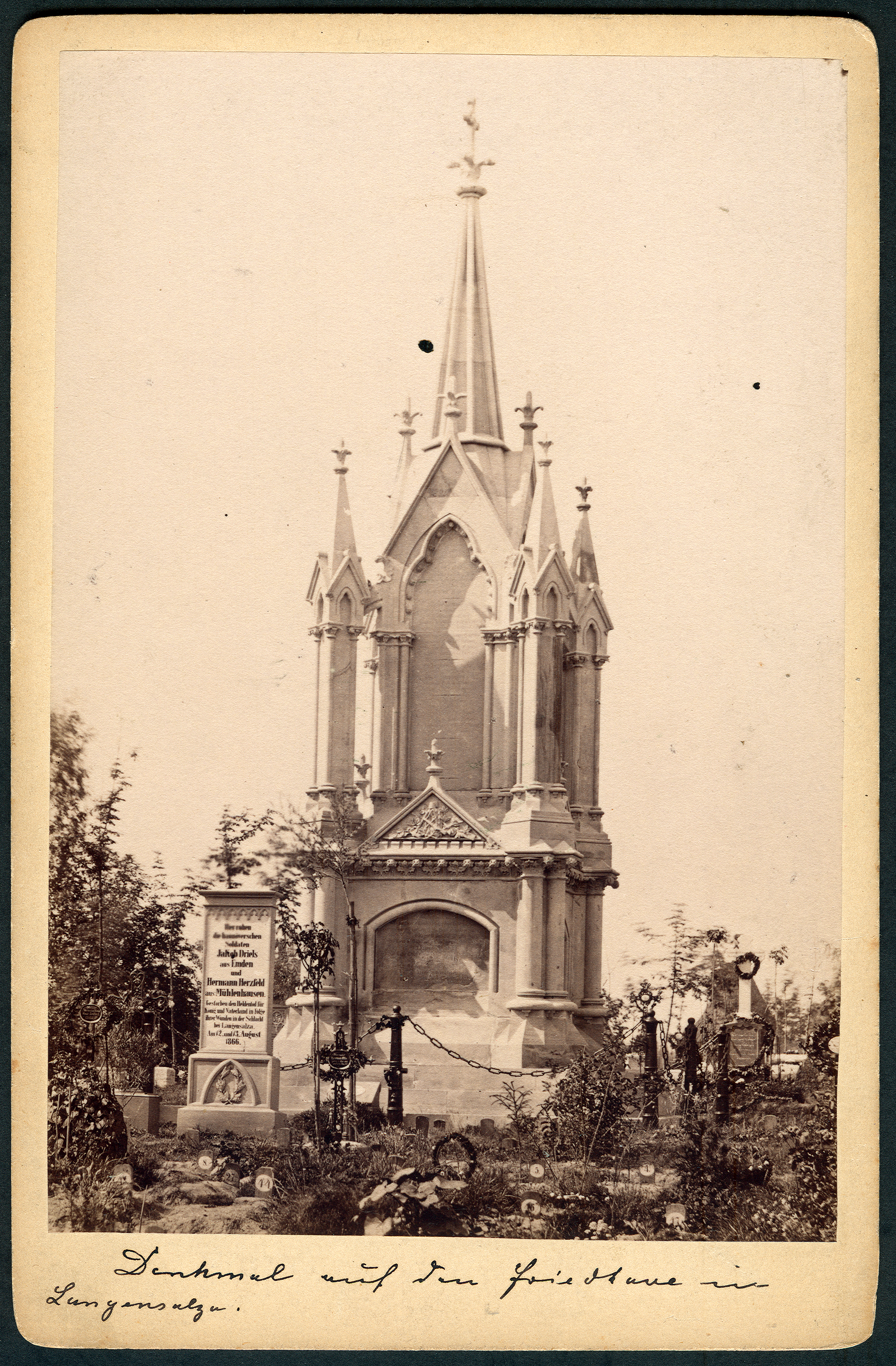
Monument to the fallen soldiers of the Kingdom of Hannover following the Battle of Lagensalza, photographed by Christian Bregazzi on 27 June 1868.

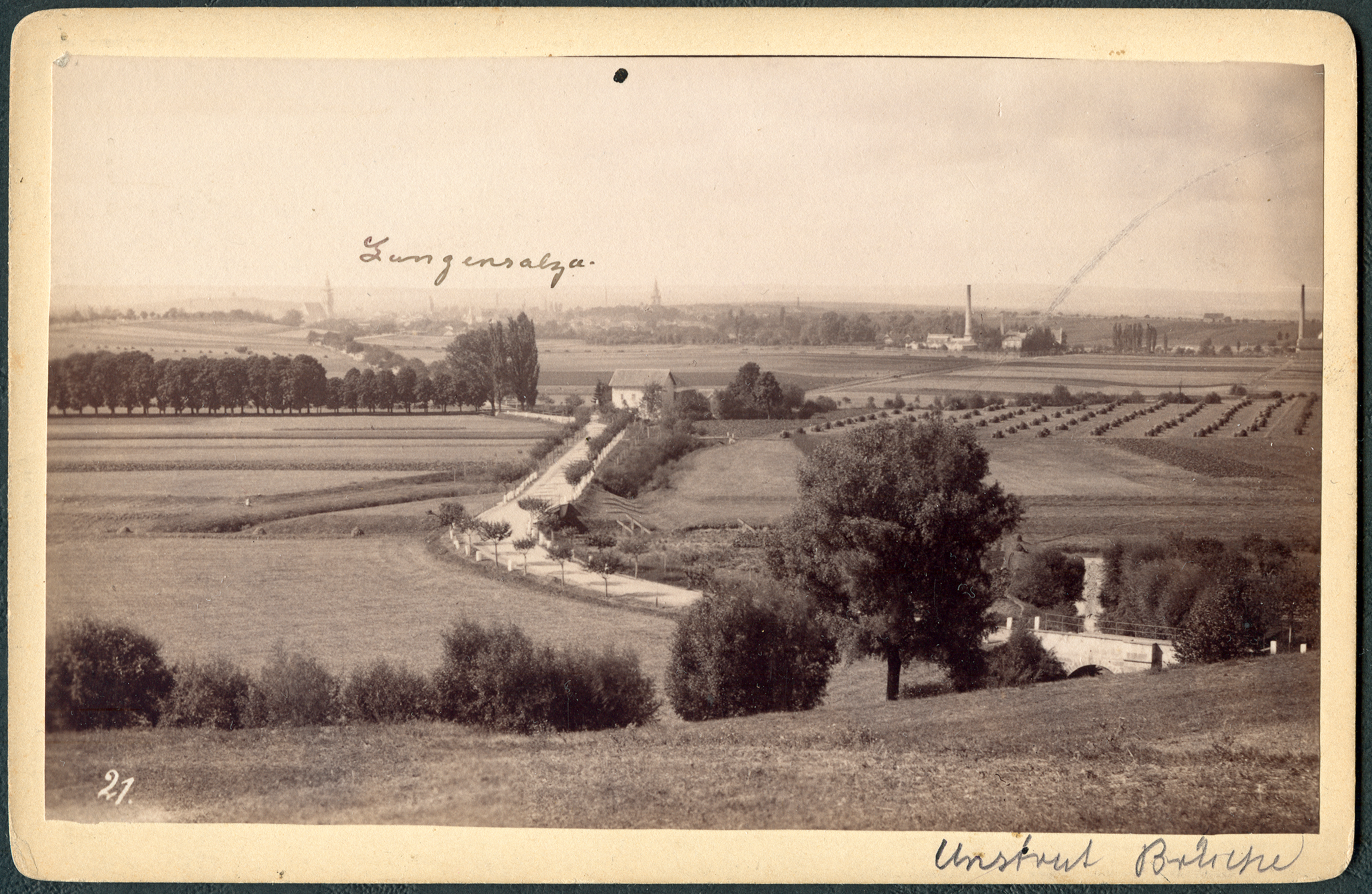
Landscape by Christian Bregazzi from a hilltop during the Battle of Langensalza, 1866. Cabinet card format, numbered "21"

Christian Bregazzi (full name: Christian Gottfried Bregazzi; 1 June 1839 – 1885) was a German photographer as well as the name of an early 20th-century publishing house for postcards.

== Life ==
Christian Gottfried Bregazzi was born in Mühlhausen, Thuringia. He was the son of an Italian painter, Giovanni Maria Alioso Bregazzi, and Johanna Dorothea Becherer. Christian married Luise Burghardt and they had three sons: Eduard, Otto and Ferdinand. In 1860 he opened a photographic studio in Bad Langensalza, which after his death was continued by his son Ferdinand under the old name, C. Bregazzi.

Bregazzi first began working in the Carte de visite (CdV) style. He became nationally known through his handwritten, consecutively numbered landscape photographs of the nearby locations of the Battle of Lagensalza in 1866. Later his photographs were sold in the larger cabinet card format and carried a blind stamp with the details of the artist.

== Legacy ==
Christian's brother Edward became a photographer in the neighboring town of Mühlhausen. His sister Cecilia Bregazzi (1825–1903) met the artist Ferdinand Tellgmann and they married in 1842. In 1891 the C. Bregazzi studio was taken over by Court photographer Franz Tellgmann, son of Ferdinand Tellgmann. The Bregazzis operated at the highest level and Christian's descendants formed a famous photographic dynasty in Thuringia and Hesse.
