= John Barr (librarian) =

New Zealand librarian

John Barr (28 July 1887 – 25 December 1971) was a New Zealand librarian. He was born in Glasgow, Lanarkshire, Scotland, on 28 July 1887.

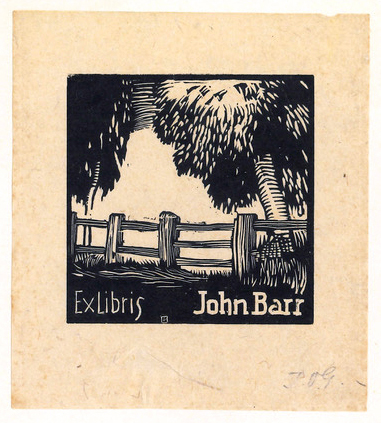
Ex Libris John Barr by Thomas Gulliver, c. 1925.
