= Marc Drogin =

American author (1936–2017)

Marc Drogin (February 7, 1936 – February 6, 2017) was an American writer and illustrator.

== Biography ==
Drogin began work as a technical secretary, first at New York University, and then at Columbia University in New York City. His first drawings appeared as line fillers in New York's The Village Voice in the 1950s. He turned to journalism as a career in 1960, working as a reporter, editor, and features editor in newspapers from Colorado to Cape Cod. At one point a humorous columnist on The Chicago Daily News, he had columns syndicated in newspapers from Britain to Borneo. He was also a staffer on Look Magazine's The Insider's Newsletter in New York.

In 1972, Drogin established his long standing graphic design business in New Hampshire. He became known for his whimsically illustrated business and appointment cards for dentists, physicians, banks, and other businesses in the US and UK.

Drogin became interested in the scripts of the Middle Ages in the 1970s, researched palaeography independently at the Bodleian Library in Oxford, England, and wrote Medieval Calligraphy: Its History and Technique, which was published in 1980 by Allanheld, Osmun & Co. Publishers, Inc. and Abner Schram, Ltd. It was re-published with corrections in 1989 by Dover Publications. This was followed by a children's version titled Yours Truly, King Arthur. He then wrote the first-ever published volume on the history of book curses, Anathema!– Medieval Scribes and the History of Book Curses (Allanheld & Schram, 1983), and a history of the discovery and destruction of ancient manuscripts called Biblioclasm. During this period, he taught calligraphic workshops and lectured across the United States, Canada, England, and Iceland. He is described on the back cover of the Dover edition of his calligraphy book as "a professional calligrapher of medieval styles, as well as illuminator, writer, and teacher."

For decades, Drogin divided his time between homes in New Hampshire and England. He established an antiques business dealing in miniature decorative objects which he ran both as a brick and mortar business, as well as online. His work for Maggs Brothers as an appraiser and medieval calligraphy expert were often employed in pricing pieces for sale both in Europe and the United States.

Drogin died on February 6, 2017, aged 80.

== Published works ==
- Medieval Calligraphy, Its History and Technique, (Allanheld & Schram, 1980; Dover, 1989) ISBN 0-486-26142-5
- Yours truly, King Arthur, (Taplinger Publishing, N.Y., 1982), ISBN 978-0-8008-8766-7, reprinted as Calligraphy of the Middle Ages and How to Do It, (Dover Publications Inc., 1998), ISBN 978-0-486-40205-5
- Anathema! Medieval scribes and the history of book curses, (Allanheld & Schram, 1983)
- Biblioclasm : the mythical origins, magic powers, and perishability of the written word, (Rowman & Littlefield, 1989), ISBN 978-0-8476-7502-9
