= Carl Ernst Bock =

German physician and anatomist (1809–1874)

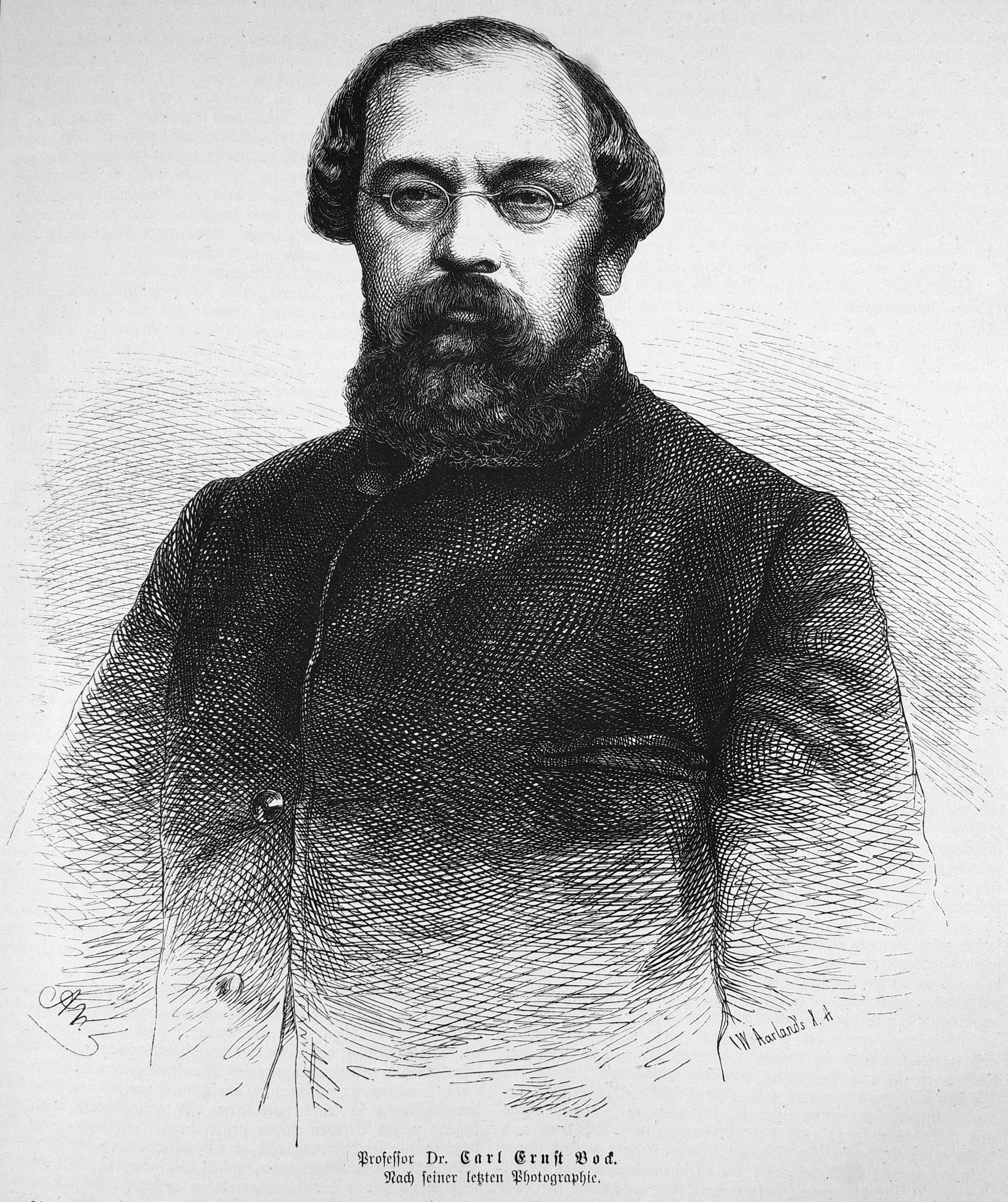
- Bock in 1874
- Born: February 21, 1809; Leipzig, Saxony, Germany
- Died: January 19, 1874 (aged 64)
- Education: Leipzig University
- Occupations: Physician; anatomist
- Father: Carl August Bock

Carl Ernst Bock (February 21, 1809 – February 19, 1874) was a German medical doctor and anatomist.

Born in Leipzig to anatomist Carl August Bock, he studied at the University of Leipzig, where he earned his doctorate in 1831. During the November Uprising in Poland, he served as a hospital physician for both the Polish and Russian armies. On returning to Leipzig in 1832 he became a private lecturer, and in 1837 was appointed to preside over autopsies at Leipzig's hospital. In 1839 he was appointed extraordinary professor of pathological anatomy, and in 1850 became head of the university's clinical department.

In addition to his writings on anatomical and surgical matters, in his later years Bock wrote numerous essays and books on public health. These were written in clear and strident language and addressed to a popular audience, often as essays in Ernst Keil's family magazine Die Gartenlaube.

== Selected works ==
- Handbuch der Anatomie des Menschen, mit Berücksichtigung der Physiologie und chirurgischen Anatomie ("Handbook of Human Anatomy, with Consideration to Physiology and Surgical Anatomy", 1838)
- Anatomisches Taschenbuch ("Anatomical Manual", 1839)
- Handatlas der Anatomie des Menschen ("Portable Atlas of Human Anatomy", 1843)
- Lehrbuch der pathologischen Anatomie und Diagnostik ("Textbook of Pathological Anatomy and Diagnosis", 1848)
- Atlas der pathologischen Anatomie ("Atlas of Pathological Anatomy", 1855)
- Buch vom gesunden und kranken Menschen ("Book of Healthy and Ill Humans", 1855)
- Volksgesundheitslehrer ("Public Health Teachers", 1865)
- Bau, Leben und Pflege des menschlichen Körpers ("Constitution, Life, and Care of the Human Body", 1868)
