= Book curse =

Method of discouraging the theft of manuscripts

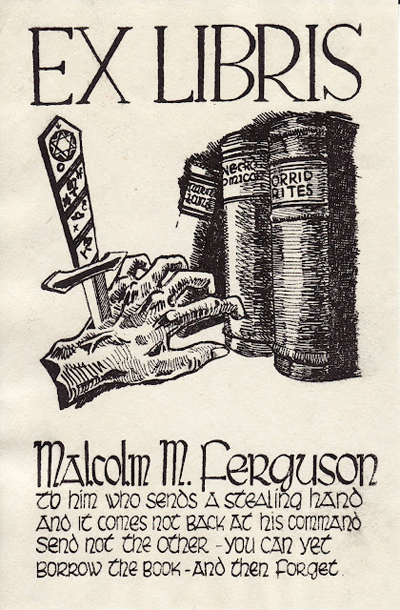
A bookplate of Malcolm Ferguson (1920–2011), example of a modern book curse

A book curse was a widely employed method to discourage the theft of manuscripts during the medieval period in Europe. The use of book curses dates back much further, to pre-Christian times, when the wrath of gods was invoked to protect books and scrolls.

They were often creative and dramatic, usually invoking threat of excommunication, or anathema. Generally located on the first or last page of a volume as part of the colophon, these curses were often considered the only defense in protection of highly coveted books and manuscripts. This was notably a time in which people believed in curses, which was critical to its effect, thus believing that, if a person stole or ripped out a page, they were destined to die an agonizing death. With the introduction of the printing press, these curses instead became "bookplates [which] enabled users to declare ownership through a combination of visual, verbal, and textual resources. For the first time, warning, threatening, and cursing had become multimodal."

An example of a book curse is: "If anyone take away this book, let him die the death; let him be fried in a pan; let the falling sickness and fever seize him; let him be broken on the wheel, and hanged. Amen."

== History ==
=== Ancient curses ===
The earliest known book curse can be traced to Ashurbanipal, King of Assyria from 668 to 627 BC, who had the following curse written on many or all of the tablets collected at the library at Nineveh, considered to be the earliest example of a systematically collected library:

I have transcribed upon tablets the noble products of the work of the scribe which none of the kings who have gone before me had learned, together with the wisdom of Nabu insofar as it existeth [in writing]. I have arranged them in classes, I have revised them and I have placed them in my palace, that I, even I, the ruler who knoweth the light of Ashur, the king of the gods, may read them. Whosoever shall carry off this tablet, or shall inscribe his name on it, side by side with mine own, may Ashur and Belit overthrow him in wrath and anger, and may they destroy his name and posterity in the land.

Another curse from Nineveh states: "Whoever removes [the tablet], writes his name in the place of my name, may Ashur and Ninlil, angered and grim, cast him down, erase his name, his seed, in the land." Other book curses were more discreet: "He who fears Anu, Enlil, and Ea will return it to the owner's house the same day", and "He who fears Anu and Antu will take care of it and respect it". Because these tablets were made of clay, and thus easily vandalized, there were specific curses to protect against such acts, such as: "In the name of Nabu and Marduk, do not rub out the text!" Nabu was the Babylonian god of writing and wisdom, son of Marduk and Sarpanitu. A more detailed curse to prevent vandalism went as follows:

He who breaks this tablet or puts it in water or rubs it until you cannot recognize it [and] cannot make it to be understood, may Ashur, Sin, Shamash, Adad and Ishtar, Bel, Nergal, Ishtar of Nineveh, Ishtar of Arbela, Ishtar of Bit Kidmurri, the gods of heaven and earth and the gods of Assyria, may all these curse him with a curse that cannot be relieved, terrible and merciless, as long as he lives, may they let his name, his seed, be carried off from the land, may they put his flesh in a dog's mouth.

Book curses date back to the creation of libraries themselves. Ancient librarians have historically regarded book thieves on par with murderers and blasphemers. Ancient librarians invoked the wrath of the gods upon book thieves and vandals. Ancient curses were even used to discourage lending books to others. One such curse stated: "He who entrusts [this book] to [others'] hands, may all the gods who are found in Babylon curse him!"

=== Medieval curses ===
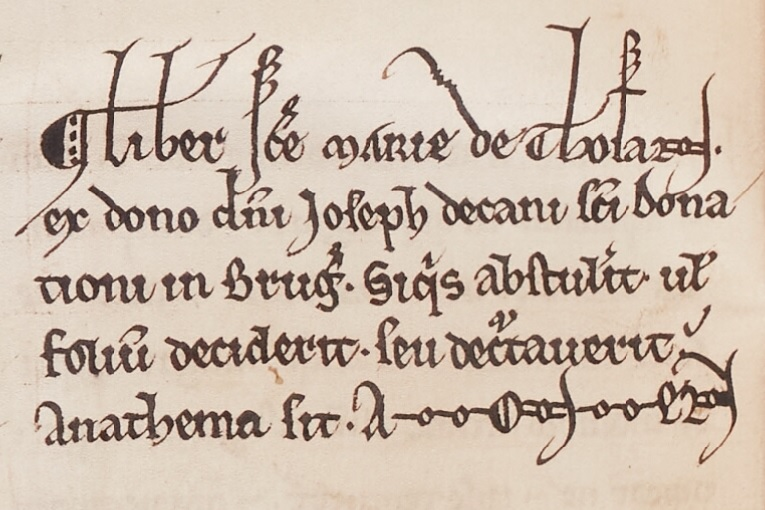
Anathema or curse in 12th–13th century manuscript of the Ter Doest Abbey that warns "whoever takes it away or alienates or tears out a sheet, be damned"

In their medieval usage, many of these curses vowed that harsh repercussions would be inflicted on anyone who appropriated the work from its proper owner. The punishments usually included excommunication, damnation, or anathema. Excommunication was the lightest of the curses because it is a reversible state. Both excommunication and anathema required identification of the guilty party as well as action on the part of the Church. Damnation had the benefit of not requiring human intervention as it was a state that the Creator, not the Church, visited instantly upon the soul of the perpetrator. All three types of curses were considered to be effective deterrents against the book thief.

At the time, these curses provided a significant social and religious penalty for those who would steal or deface books, which were all considered to be precious works before the advent of the printing press. Writes Stephen Greenblatt, in The Swerve: How the World Became Modern: "Books were scarce and valuable. They conferred prestige on the monastery that possessed them, and the monks were not inclined to let them out of their sight. On occasion monasteries tried to secure their possession by freighting their precious manuscripts with curses."

Medieval scribes wrote most curses in the book's colophon, the one place in the manuscript where a scribe could write freely. Each book curse tends to be unique, and some include clever rhymes:

Steal not this book my honest friend
For fear the gallows should be your end,
And when you die the Lord will say
And where's the book you stole away?

The curse added in Patriarch Theodosius' own hand is at the bottom of this Greek manuscript

The Greek Orthodox patriarch Theodosius the Prince added curses to his manuscripts pronouncing anathema on anyone who removed them from the church to which he bequeathed them, the church where he was to be buried.

The book Anathema! Medieval Scribes and the History of Book Curses by Marc Drogin is the largest collection of curses, and has been paramount in further understanding the concept of book curses. According to Drogin, book curses are evidence of how valuable books were to the scribes and scholars of those days. Drogin also goes to some length in explaining how books were made in the era of monastic scribes, illuminated manuscripts, and parchment. The physical labor and resources necessary in producing a single volume explains why scribes were inclined to take drastic measures to protect them.

May the sword of anathema slay
If anyone steals this book away.
Si quis furetur,
Anathematis ense necetur.

Since Nabu first used his own name to invoke a book curse, this practice has evolved. Using the book owner's name has changed from medieval to modern times as a way to mark ownership of books. After the invention of the printing press, to protect books, hand-written book curses evolved into printed bookplates that were pasted to the front covers of books, usually styled ex libris, then to the owner's name. This practice has changed again back to using handwritten names on the interior front cover of books.

In contrast, a scribe from the Evesham Abbey wrote, "A colophon that praises the scribe's work — and requests high-quality wine ('vini nobilis haustum') for him as a reward — ends with a curse in which the book's thief is wished a 'death from evil things: may the thief of this book die' (Morteque malorum: raptor libri moriatur)".

=== Edwardian curses ===
Book curses continued into Edwardian Britain, as an aspect of property ownership. However, by this time, curses were included more as a tradition than a real threat.

=== Additional book curse examples ===
May whoever steals me cease
Ever to have a moment’s peace.

Whoever steals this Book of Prayer
May he be ripped apart by swine
His heart be splintered, this I swear
And his body dragged along the Rhine.
– Simon Vostre of Paris, 1502.

One oft-quoted example of a book curse, purportedly from a Barcelona monastery, is actually fictional, taken from the 1909 hoax The Old Librarian's Almanack:

And what Condemnation shall befit the accurst Wretch (for he cannot justly claim the title of Man) who pilfers and purloins for his own selfish ends such a precious article as a Book? I am reminded of the Warning display'd in the Library of the Popish Monastery of San Pedro at Barcelona. This is the version English'd by Sir Matthew Manhan, who saw it writ in Latin in the Monastery, as he himself describes in his learn'd Book, Travels in Spanish Countries, 1712. The Warning reads thusly: "For him that stealeth a Book from this Library, let it change to a Serpent in his hand and rend him. Let him be struck with Palsy, and all his Members blasted. Let him languish in Pain, crying aloud for Mercy and let there be no surcease to his Agony till he sink to Dissolution. Let Book-worms gnaw his Entrails in token of the Worm that dieth not, and when at last he goeth to his final Punishment let the Flames of Hell consume him for ever and aye."

== Document curse ==
A significant subset of the book curse is the document curse. These curses were employed in much the same way as the book curse, but with one significant difference; while book curses almost always protected a physical book (or tablet), document curses were generally worded to protect the text of the document that contained them. They were often found in wills, grants, charters and sometimes in writs. Document curses show an intersection between Christian beliefs, pagan practices, and legal proceedings.

A scribe added a curse to the end of the book of Revelation, which reads:

I warn everyone who hears the words of the prophecy of this book: if any one adds to them, God will add to him the plagues described in this book, and if any one takes away from the words of the book of this prophecy, God will take away his share in the tree of life in the holy city, which are described in this book.

One document curse from an Anglo-Saxon will written in AD 1046 reads:

And he who shall detract from my will which I have now declared in the witness of God, may he be deprived of joy on this earth, and may the Almighty Lord who created and made all creatures exclude him from the fellowship of all saints on the Day of Judgement, and may he be delivered into the abyss of hell to Satan the devil and all his accursed companions and there suffer with God's adversaries without end and never trouble my heirs.

Another document curse from a land grant in AD 934 reads:

If however, which God forbid, anyone puffed up with the pride of arrogance shall try to destroy or infringe this little document of my agreement and confirmation, let him know that on the last and fearful Day of Assembly when the trumpet of the archangel is clanging the call and bodies are leaving the foul graveyards, he will burn with Judas the committer of impious treachery, and also with the miserable Jews blaspheming with sacrilegious mouth Christ on the altar of the cross in eternal confusion in the devouring flames of blazing torments in punishments without end.

== See also ==
- Book rhyme
- Curse of the Pharaohs
