= Arnold Goodwin =

British-New Zealand artist (1889–1978)

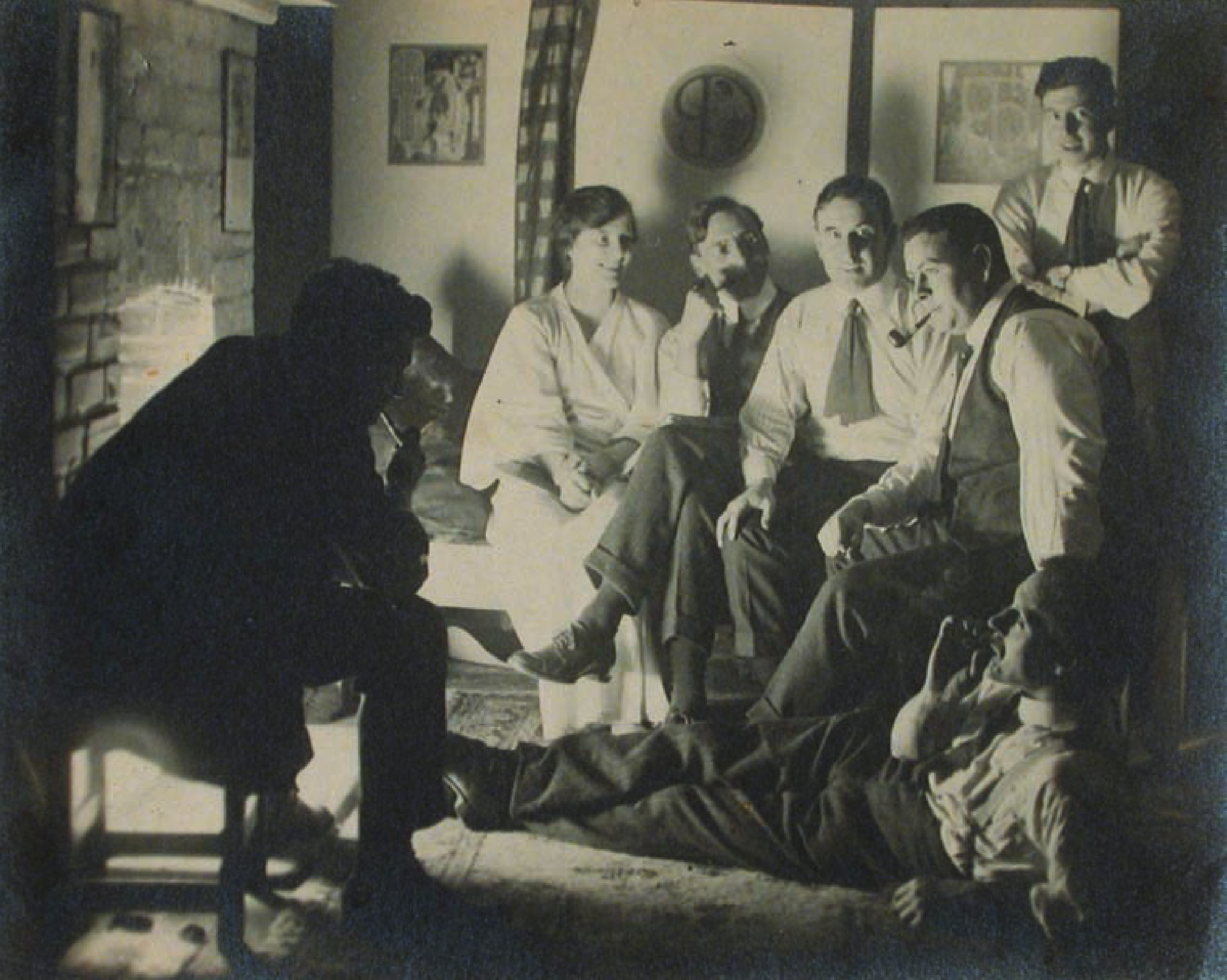
- Goodwin photographed with the Quoin Club in 1919 (left, in shadow)
- Born: Arnold Frederick Goodwin; 29 July 1889; Leicester, Leicestershire, England
- Died: 26 March 1978 (aged 88); Auckland, New Zealand
- Occupations: Designer; Design Educator; Artist; Puppeteer
- Years active: c. 1915 – c. 1950

Arnold Frederick Goodwin (29 July 1889 – 26 March 1978) was a New Zealand designer, printmaker and puppeteer.

== Biography ==
Goodwin was born in Leicester, Leicestershire, England, on 29 July 1889 to parents George and Florence Goodwin.

He studied at the Camden and Bolt Court schools of art in London, and the Académie Julian and Académie Colarossi in Paris, winning the "prix de concours"; then worked as an illustrator and designer at Carlton Studio, London, alongside Harold Nelson, Alfred Garth Jones, John Campbell, Ernest Charles Wallcousins and Henry Ospovat. Carrying on in similar fashion, he worked for Carlton Illustrators in New York, before emigrating to New Zealand, to settle in Auckland in 1913. He worked as a printer for Chandler & Co and The New Zealand Herald, before starting his own advertising company—Carlton Studio, Designers and Illustrators—in 1918. In 1916, with his friend Thomas Gulliver, he founded the Quoin Club to promote graphic and print art in Auckland.

Moving on from the business of commercial art and parting company with Carlton Studio, Goodwin became Director of Design and Applied Art at the Elam School of Fine Arts in 1935. He was involved with the Auckland Little Theatre Society, where he designed sets and performed as an actor and marionette puppeteer. It has been said that "puppetry in New Zealand begins and ends with one man: Arnold Goodwin", and that "his touring marionette productions of Shakespearean plays in the 1940s were widely acclaimed as being in world class".

Goodwin died in Auckland on 26 March 1978, at the age of 88.

== Notes ==
=== References ===
- Vangioni, Peter (2023), Ink on Paper: Aotearoa New Zealand printmakers of the modern era (PDF), Christchurch: Christchurch Art Gallery Te Puna o Waiwhetū, p. 40, ISBN 9781877375774
- Ross, Gail Macdonald (2006). New Zealand Prints 1900-1950: An unseen heritage (PhD thesis). University of Canterbury.
- Tornquist, Herbert R. (1 April 1954). "Arnold F. Goodwin: Artist, Producer, Master of Many Parts". Home & Building. Vol. 16, no. 11. Auckland: The Magazine Press. pp. 42–43, 64–65, 67.
