= Blind stamp =

Design formed by a depression in material

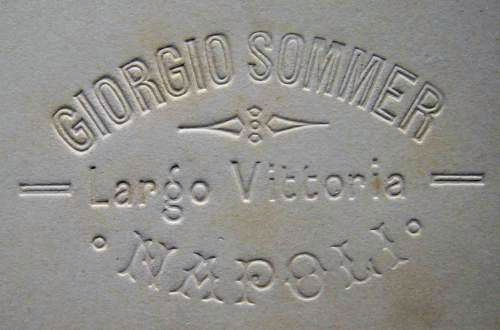
Giorgio Sommer's blind stamp

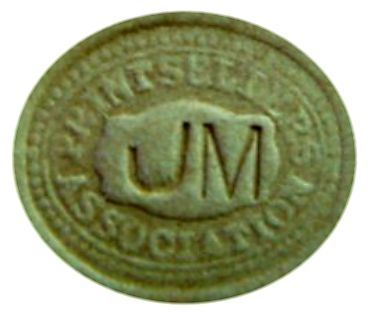
Blind stamp of Printsellers' Association

A blind stamp ('blind' meaning uncoloured) is an image, design or lettering on an art print or book formed by creating a depression in the paper or other material. It is the opposite of embossing which refers to a design created by raising the paper above the surrounding area. It is also distinct from foil stamping, which is a depression that is filled with a thin layer of metal, usually gold.

A blind stamp is often unobtrusive, and careful inspection may be necessary to establish its presence. Occasionally seen on the covers and spines of older books, blind stamps may be quite decorative. Libraries or book owners often make use of a blind stamp to mark their copies in the same way that a bookplate denotes ownership, and legal firms have taken to marking their documents in such a way.

In 1838 the guild of the Printsellers' Association was set up, later known as the Fine Art Trade Guild, and one of its aims was to regulate the number of proofs printed before commencing the main run of a plate. The presence of their blind stamp is therefore clear evidence that a print is a proof. Blind stamps were not part of the printing process, but were added on completion of the run and consequently vary in their placing on the prints.

Manufacturers of leather goods, such as handbags, often make use of blind stamps on their products to discourage fakes, and to indicate the provenance and date of manufacture. Since it is technically simple to forge a blind stamp, the system has limited deterrent value.
