= Thomas Gulliver =

New Zealand artist (1891–1933)

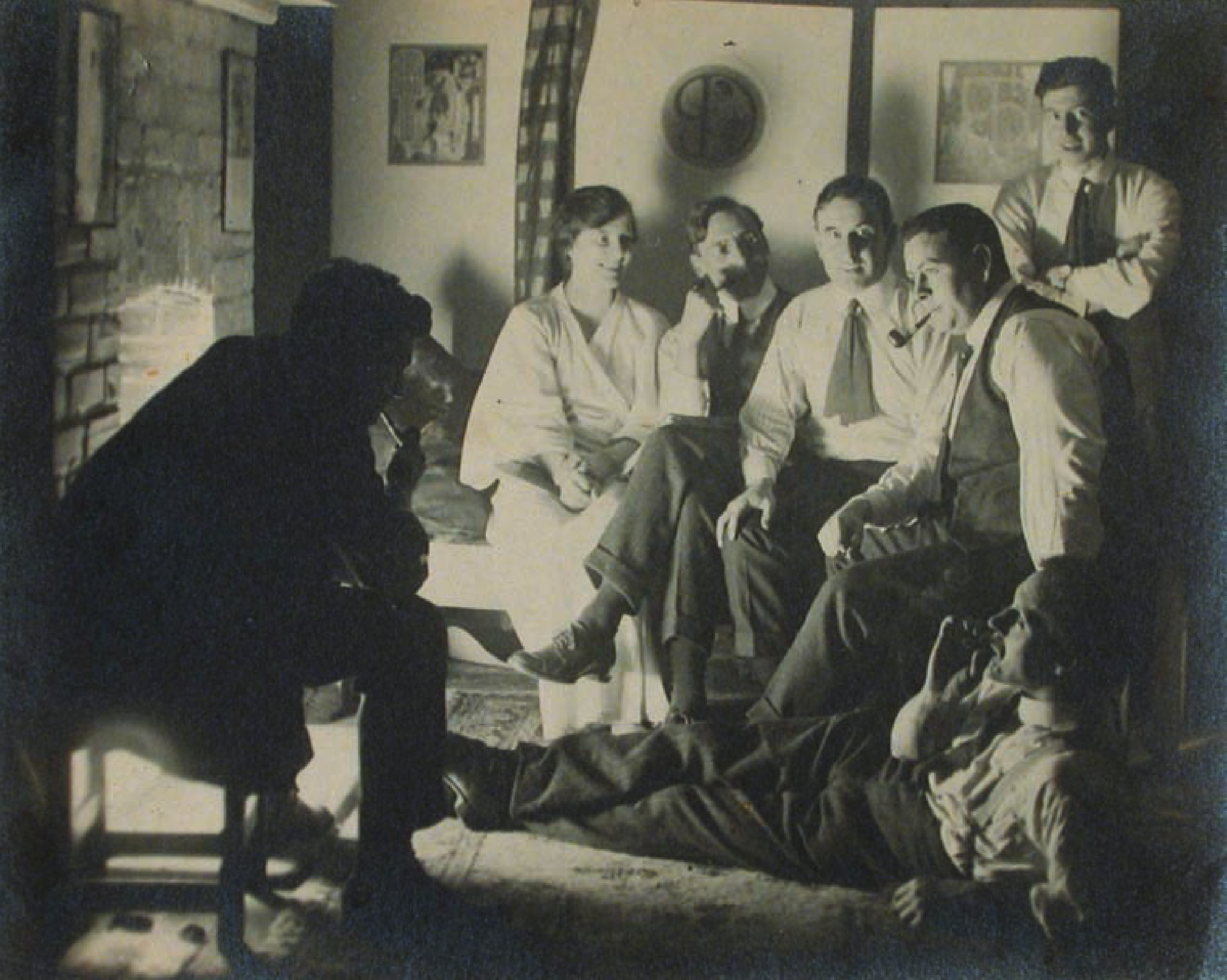
- Thomas Gulliver, fifth from left, at a Quion Club meeting, 1919
- Born: 1891; Auckland, New Zealand
- Died: 1933 (aged 41–42); Auckland, New Zealand
- Occupations: Artist, civil engineer
- Years active: c. 1910–c. 1930

Thomas Ralph de Vere Gulliver (1891–1933) was a New Zealand printmaker, photographer and railway engineer. Despite considering himself an amateur, he was a leading authority in New Zealand on graphic arts in his time.

With his friend Arnold Goodwin, Gulliver was the co-founder of the Quoin Club in 1916, which worked to promote printmaking as an art form through the following decade.

Gulliver mostly worked in the medium of etched and engraved woodblock printing, but also experimented with photography and sketching. The Auckland Art Gallery recognised him as Honorary Curator of the Print Collection for his assistance to them in curating their collection in the late 1920s.

Gulliver died of cancer in 1933.

== Art Gallery ==
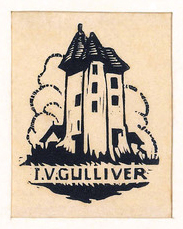
Ex Libris T. V. Gulliver. Woodcut

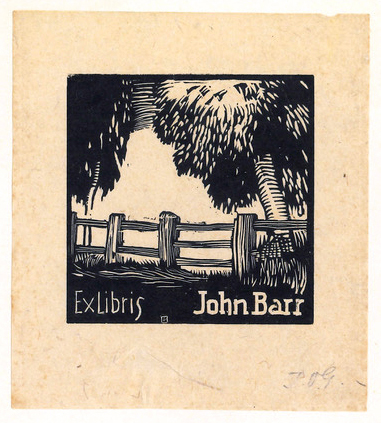
Ex Libris John Barr (1887–1971). Woodcut

A Pied Fantail. Lithograph

== Publications ==
- Gulliver, Thomas (2 October 1922). "The Graphic Arts: Drypoints and Aquatints". The Ladies' Mirror. Vol. 1, no. 4. p. 32 – via Papers Past.
- Gulliver, Thomas (1 September 1922). "The Graphic Arts: Etching". The Ladies' Mirror. Vol. 1, no. 3. p. 24 – via Papers Past.
- Gulliver, Thomas (1 July 1922). "The Graphic Arts and Wall Decoration". The Ladies' Mirror. Vol. 1, no. 1. p. 28 – via Papers Past.
