= Jacques Merlin =

Jacques (Joaquim) Merlin (c. 1480 – 26 September 1541) was a French theologian and book editor, best remembered for his pioneering two-volume collection of church councils, the Quatuor concilia generalia printed in 1524.

Jacques was born in Saint-Victurnien. He became a doctor of theology at the College of Navarre in 1499. He then taught divinity at Limoges Cathedral.

He died in Paris in 1541 and was buried in the crypt of Notre-Dame.
