= Quatuor concilia generalia =

1524 ecclesiastical history book by Jacques Merlin

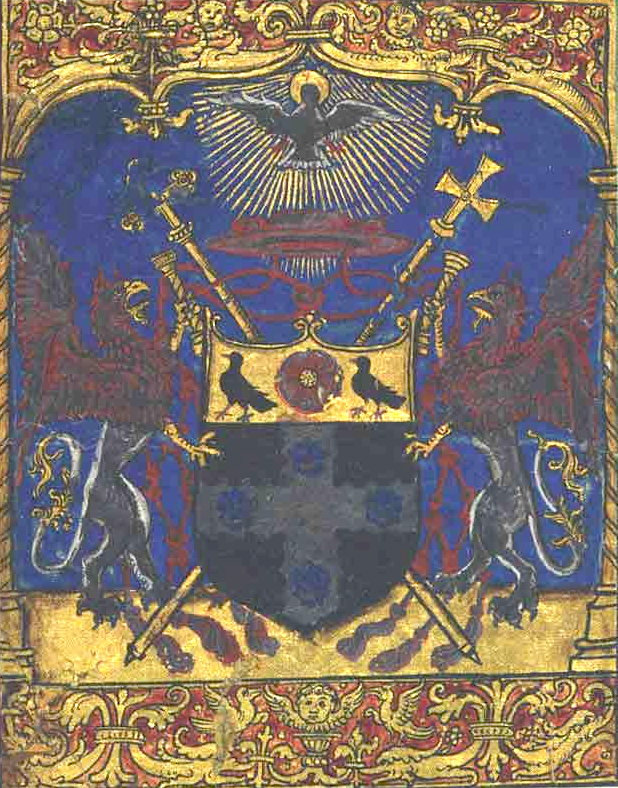
Bookplate of Cardinal Wolsey pasted in the copy of Tomus primus quatuor conciliorum generalium held in the Bodleian Library

The Quatuor concilia generalia (Tomus primus quatuor Conciliorum generalium & Tomus secundus quatuor Conciliorum generalium) was a two volume book published in 1524 in Paris. It was edited by Jacques Merlin, printed by Jean Cornilleau and published by Galliot du Pré. It concerns four Ecumenical councils: the Third Council of Constantinople (Sixth Ecumenical Council 680–681), the controversial Second Council of Nicaea (Seventh Ecumenical Council 787), the Council of Constance (sixteenth Ecumenical Council 1414-18) and the dramatic Council of Basel (seventeenth Ecumenical Council 1431–1449).

== Known copies ==
There are very few known extant copies:

| Library | Provenance |
|---|---|
| Harvard Library | Cuthbert Turner, Pusey House, Library |
| University of St Andrews Library | |
| Bodleian Library | Cardinal Wolsey |
| Royal Library of the Netherlands | |
| Bibliothèque nationale de France | |
| University of Deusto | |
| Biblioteca Nacional de España | |
| Biblioteca de la Universidad Complutense de Madrid (online) | |
| Universitat de Barcelona | Convent of Sant Francesc d'Assís (Barcelona) |
| British Library | |

In volume one (Tomus primus) of the copy in the Bodleian there is the first example of an English bookplate David Pearson has suggested that the bookplate – painted on paper rather than printed – may have been put there by someone donating the book to Wolsey. Such a bookplate is not to be found in the second volume.

== Digital copy ==
- Tomus primus quatuor Conciliorum vol. 1
