= Jean Cornilleau =

Parisian printer

Jean Cornilleau was a Parisian printer active in the sixteenth century. The first book he printed was Expositiones sive declarationes omnium titulorum juris tam Civilis quam canonici by Sebastian Brant, published by François Regnault.
