= François Regnault (printer) =

French printer and publisher

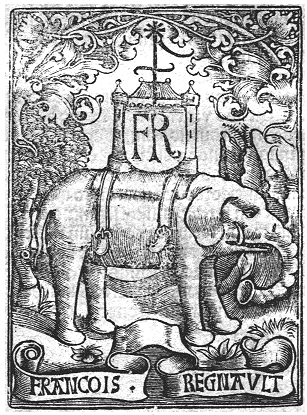
François Regnault's printers device used 1512-1551

François Regnault (Latin: Reginaldus; died 1540/1) was a French printer and publisher active in Paris at the beginning of the sixteenth century.

François was born in Caen and came to Paris in about 1475. He started as an independent printer around 1500 or 1501. In 1522 he purchased premises from the stationer Guillaume Roland, and continued publishing under the sign of the elephant.

Much of his work was printing liturgical documents for the Catholic Church in England, and numerous historical and classical texts. After his death, his sons assumed continued the business using the same imprint until 1551 using the same woodcuts and typesets.

His name and device were incorporated into the design of the Thomas Jefferson Building of the Library of Congress.
