= Limoges Cathedral =

Cathedral located in Haute-Vienne, in France

Limoges French: Cathédrale Saint-Étienne de Limoges
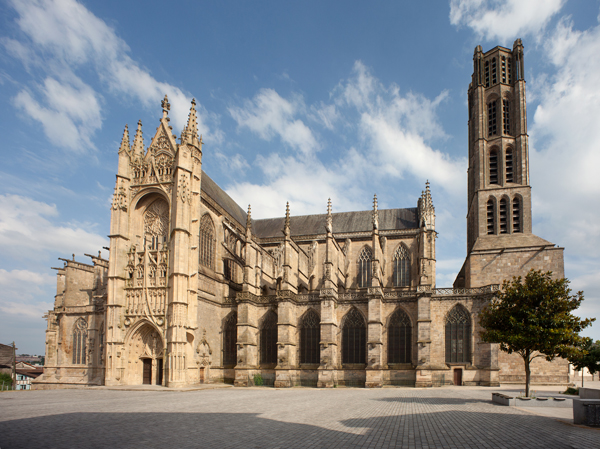
- Limoges Cathedral in 2019

Religion
- Affiliation: Roman Catholic Church
- Rite: Roman
- Ecclesiastical or organisational status: Cathedral
- Status: Active

Location
- Location: Limoges, France
- Interactive map of Limoges; French: Cathédrale Saint-Étienne de Limoges
- Coordinates: 45°49′44″N 1°16′0″E

Architecture
- Type: Church
- Style: Gothic, Renaissance, Romanesque
- Groundbreaking: 1273
- Completed: 1888

Limoges Cathedral (French: Cathédrale Saint-Étienne de Limoges) is a Roman Catholic church located in Limoges, France. It is a national monument and the seat of the Bishop of Limoges.

Construction of the Gothic cathedral began in 1273, but was not completed until 1888. The cathedral combines elements of Romanesque architecture, Gothic architecture and Renaissance architecture. It is noted for the Flamboyant façade of the transept, vestiges of Romanesque architecture, particularly in the bell tower, and the Renaissance rood screen with reliefs of the labors of Hercules, built in 1534.

== History ==
=== Early churches ===
The presence of a bishop and a cathedral in Limoges was recorded as early as 475 A.D. Gregory of Tours mentioned a church the city, facing the château off the vicomte and the Abbey of Saint-Martial. During the enlargement of the church in 1876, workers found subbasements of an early church of the Carolingian period, and the nave of a Romanesque church. The discoveries included fragments of Roman columns, bas-reliefs and Latin inscriptions, suggesting that the church was built on the site of a former Roman temple, palace or villa. In 2005, archeologists also discovered traces of a hexagonal baptistry dating from the 5th century under the north face of the cathedral.

The early cathedral was constructed in the center of the city in the valley of the Vienne River, not far from the Abbey of Saint-Martial and the former château of the Viscoun of Limoges. In July 817, the Holy Roman Emperor Louis the Pious presented documents granting legal immunity to the clergy of the cathedral. A clerical city gradually grew up along the Vienne River.

=== Romanesque church ===
The Romanesque cathedral was dedicated by Hilduin or Aduin, the Bishop of Limoges, and was consecrated by Pope Urban II. who passed through Limoges on his return from the Council of Clermont after launching the First Crusade in 1095. In 1074 and again in 1105, the church was set on fire by mobs from the rival district of Saint Martial du Vicompte. After the 1105 fire, the wooden Romanesque nave was rebuilt with a vaulted stone roof. The Romanesque church was narrower and shorter than the later Gothic cathedral. Some vestiges of this early cathedral remain, including the crypt and three lower floors of the bell tower. The church was built in the form of a Latin cross, and was about sixty meters long and seventeen meters wide, with a transept forty meters long, on the site of the present transept.

=== Gothic church ===
By the mid-13th century, the Romanesque cathedral had become too small for the growing city population. Aymeric de la Serre, The Bishop of Limoges from 1246 to 1272, proposed to rebuild the church on a much grander scale using his own personal fortune. The architecture was inspired by Gothic architecture, which had appeared in the Ile-de-France in the 1140s, particularly at The Basilica of Saint-Denis and Chartres Cathedral. The architect of the Gothic church is unknown, but was likely the Paris architect Jean de Deschamps, who had been working in the South of France at the time and taken part in the construction of the cathedrals of Clermont (1262), Toulouse and Narbonne (1272) and Rodez (1277).

Bishop Aymeric de la Serre died in 1272 before construction began, but in June 1273, his project for the new cathedral was taken up by doyen of the chapter of the cathedral, Helie de Mamemort, who laid the first stone of the Gothic chevet, Construction continued through seven or eight different campaigns, with different terms of workers, but remained largely faithful to the original Rayonnant style. The work began with the construction of a chevet with a semi-circular deambulatory. The work was made more difficult by the steep slopes of the site, requiring the building very large terrace which served as the sub-basement of the chevet. Furthermore, due to the growth of the city closer to the walls of the church on the north side, the chapels on that side had to be smaller than those on the south side. A further complication had appeared in 1259, with the signing of the Treaty of Paris between France and Britain. The town was divided between a British sector and a French sector, with the borderline close to the cathedral, which lay just within the French sector.

Work was halted in 1327 for several decades due to a shortage of funds, but resumed with in the second part of the century with the building of the southern wing and the transept and its rose window. In 1378, the chapel of Saint Martial was finished. and the Romanesque bell tower was reinforced so that upper levels in the Gothic style could be added. By 1444 the Gothic chevet and rebuilt transept were attached to the Romanesque nave. Following the end of the Hundred Years War, the two eastern traverses were built between 1458 and 1499. Between 1516 and 1541, the Bishops Philippe de Montmorency (1517–1519) and Charles Villiers de L'Ilse Adam (1522–1530) built the portal of Saint Jean, a masterpiece of Flamboyant architecture, at the end of the northern transept. This brought the Chapel of Saint Valerie, the former chapel of Saint-Martial, into the cathedral structure, where it serves as the baptistry. Between 1533 and 1534 the Bishop Jean de Langeac created the jubé, the highly decorated barrier separating the choir from the nave. In 1533, Jean de Langeac commissioned the ornate jube to close the choir, and began work on the next four traverses of the nave. On June 30, 1571, the spire of the church was stuck by lightning, which started a fire which spread to the belfry, where the 11 bells melted. The bells were cast again, and five were reinstalled in the church in 1575.

=== 19th-century completion and restoration ===
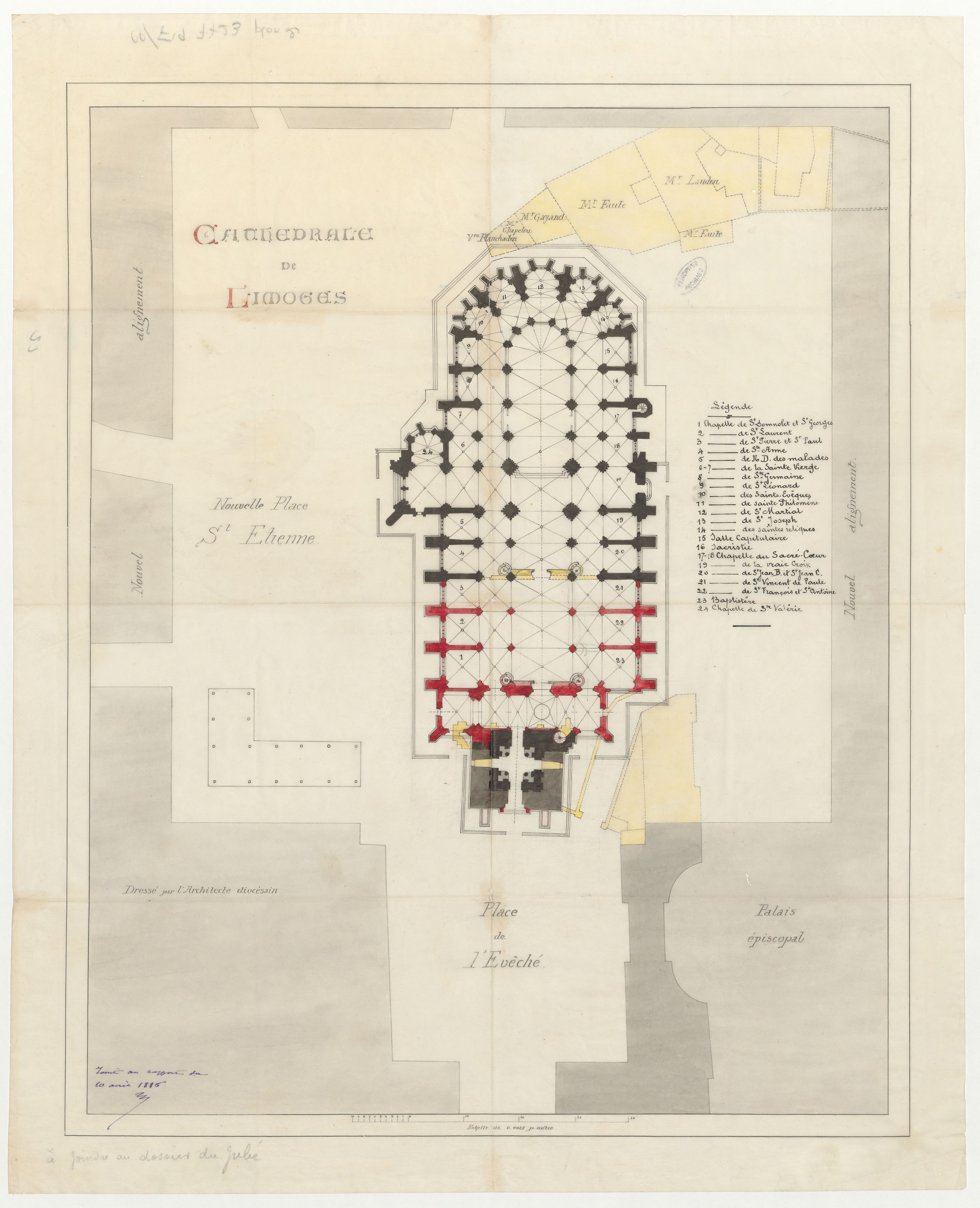
Plan for the completion of the cathedral (in red) and junction with bell tower (19th century)

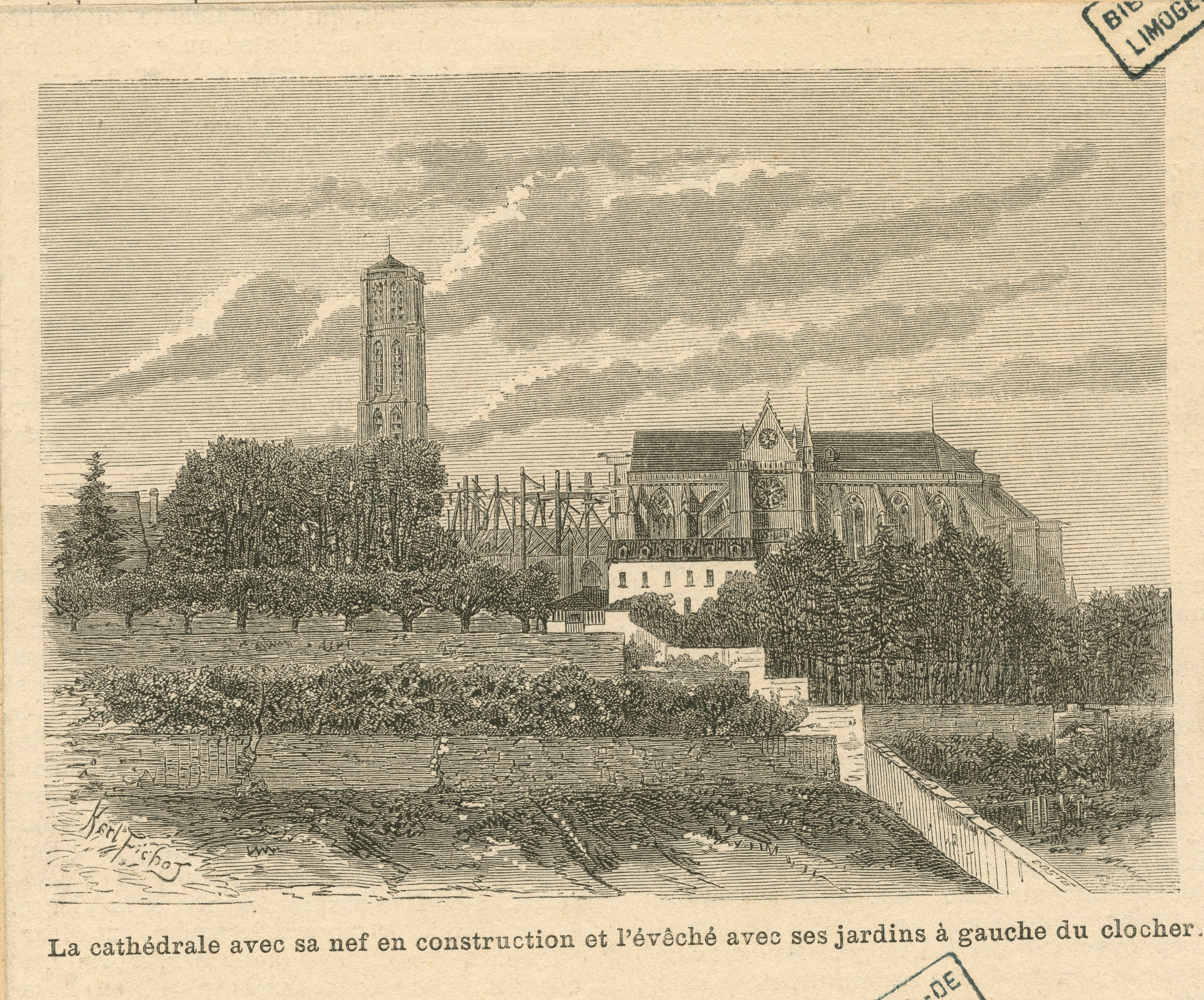
Completion of the nave, and junction with the bell tower (1880s)

A major restoration of both the exterior and interior of the church, including the completion of the upper portion of the north transept of the church was carried out between 1847 and 1852 by the architect Pierre Prosper Chabrol. The church was formally listed as an historic monument of France in 1862. Work to complete the church began in 1876 and was finished on August 12, 1888. The three upper storeys of the bell-tower were completed, and three traverses were added to the nave to complete the original medieval plan. A narthex was added to create a connection with the porch of the bell tower, and other modifications of materials and colour were made to assure that the appearance of the church was harmonious, even after eight hundred years of modifications.

=== 2005 explosion ===
A powerful explosion of a terrorist device attached to a gas canister took place in 2005, and damaged more than three thousand pieces of stained glass. Restoration of the glass in the windows was still underway in 2020.

== Exterior ==
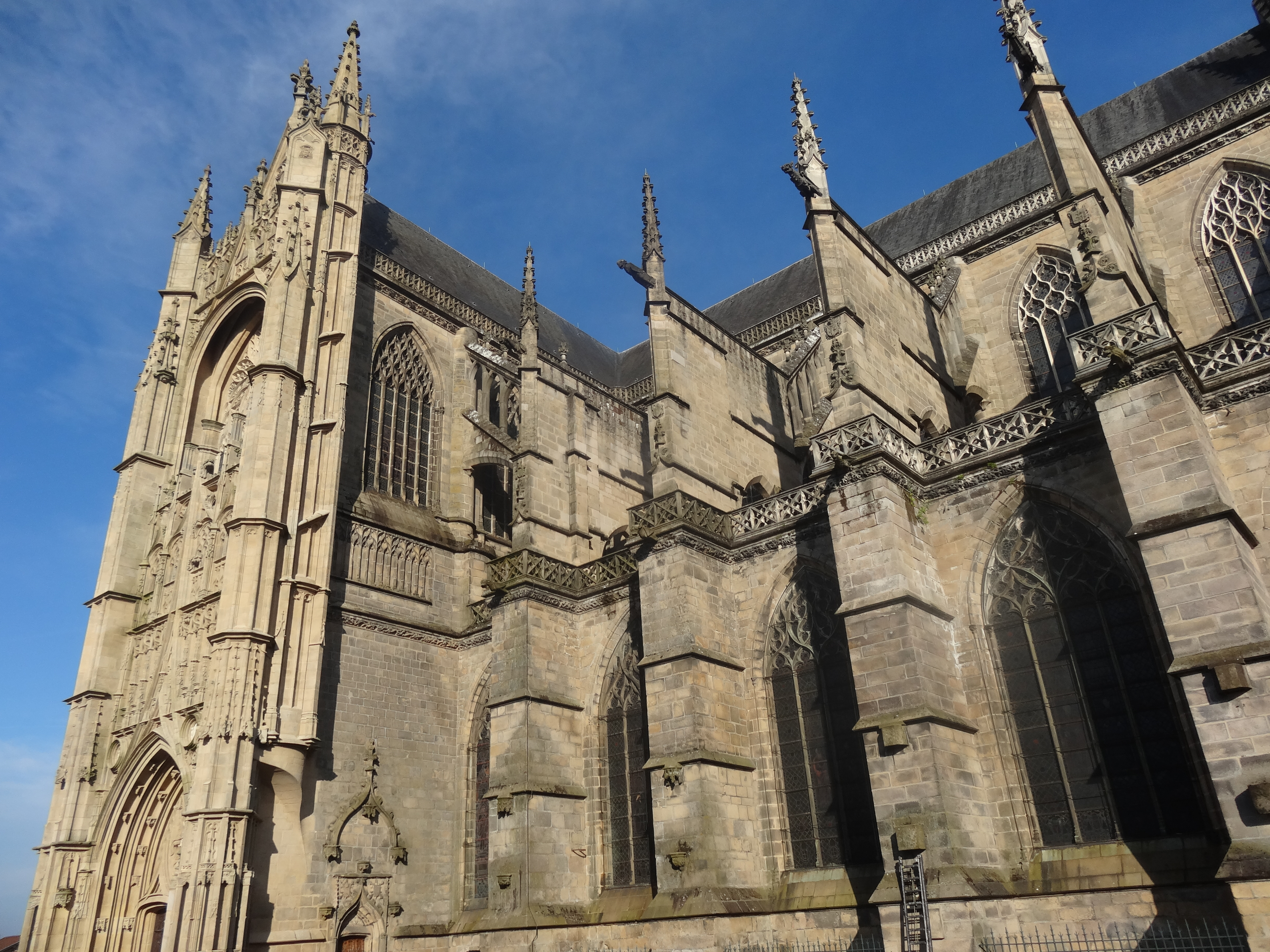
Buttresses of The nave and the north transept

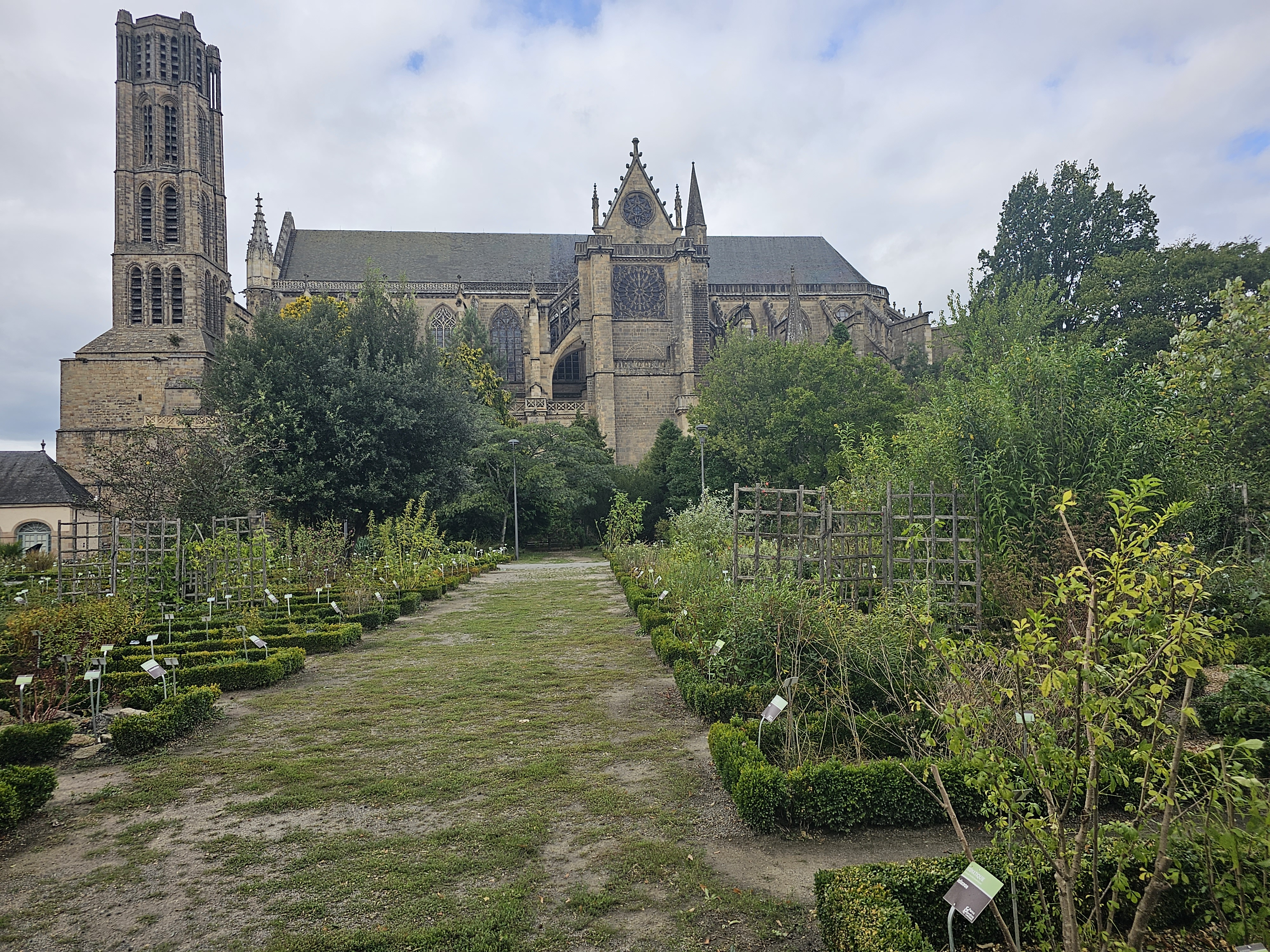
South side of the cathedral seen from the botanical garden

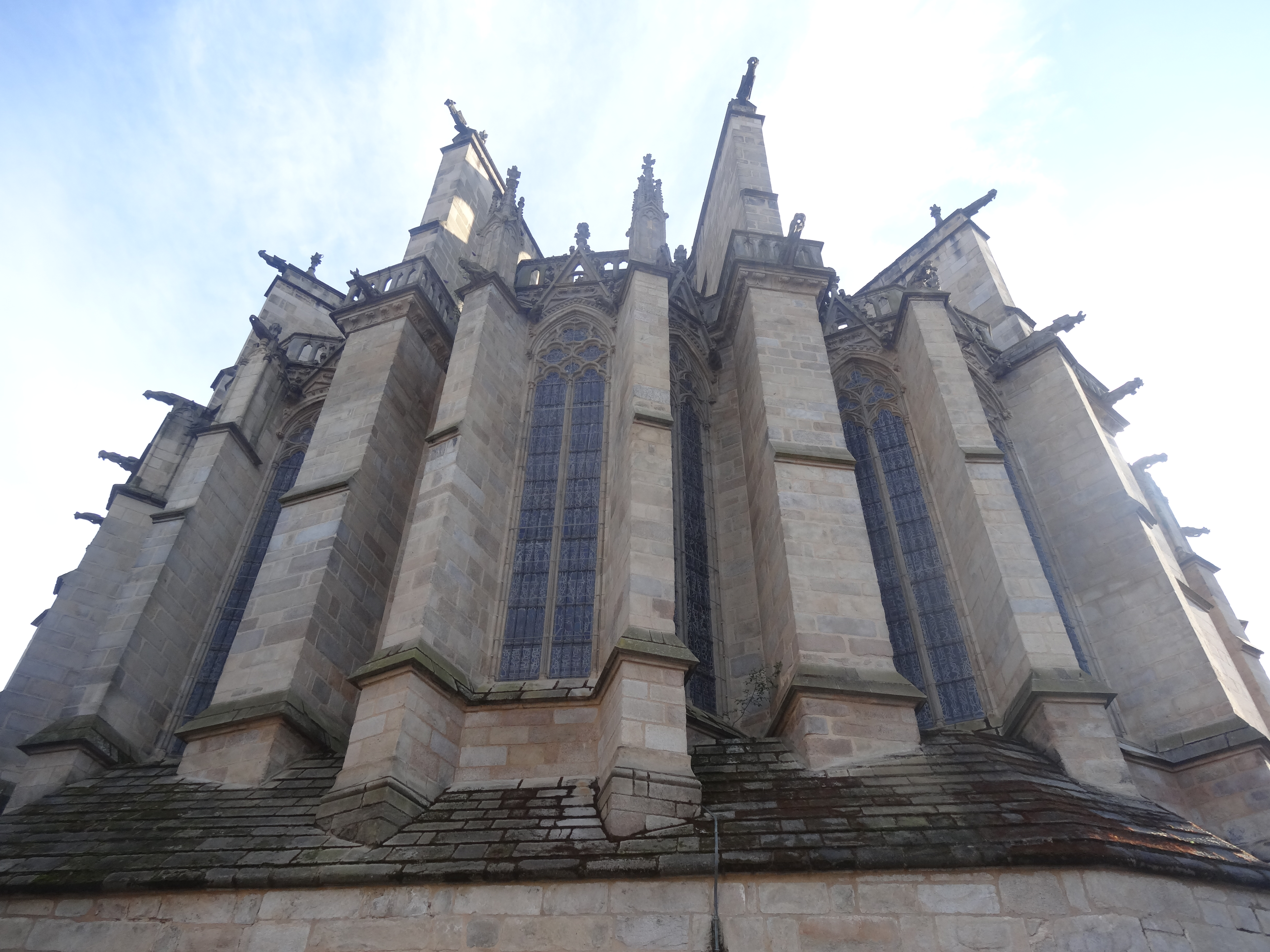
The apse

The original plan of the Gothic church used the form of a Latin cross, with transepts. The plan was limited by the steep slope on one side, and the decision to integrate the Romanesque tower into the Gothic cathedral. The southern transept was shorter, due to the steep slope of the site.

=== Bell tower ===
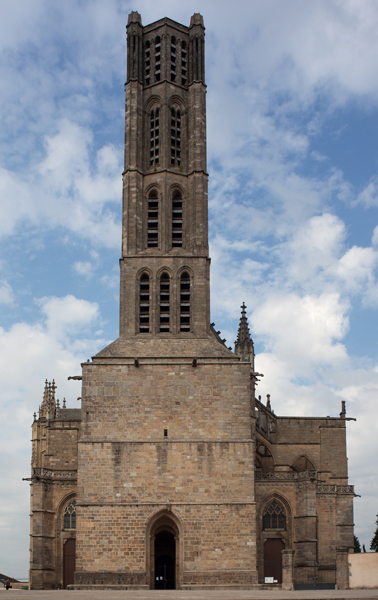
The bell tower

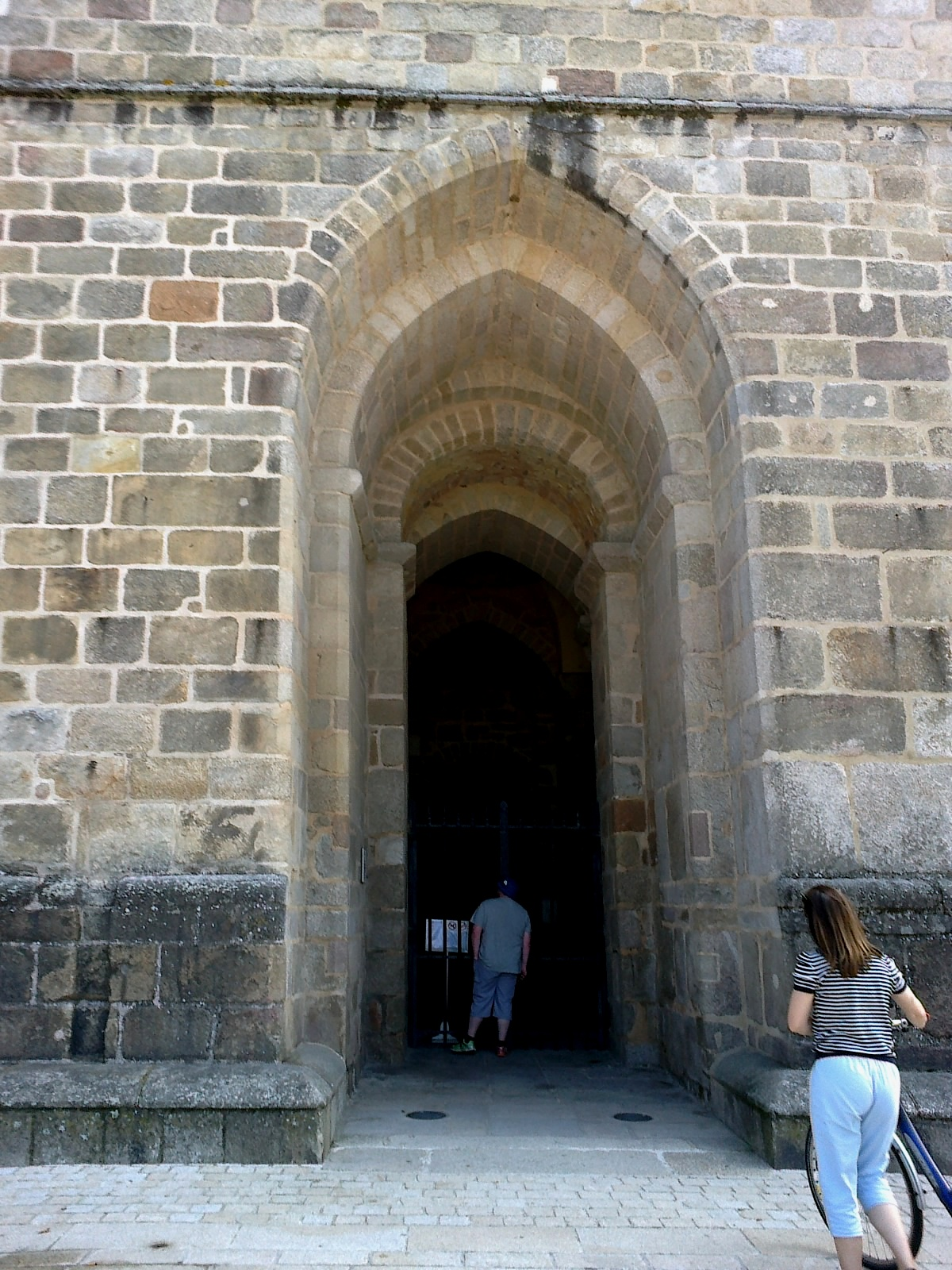
The portal of the bell tower

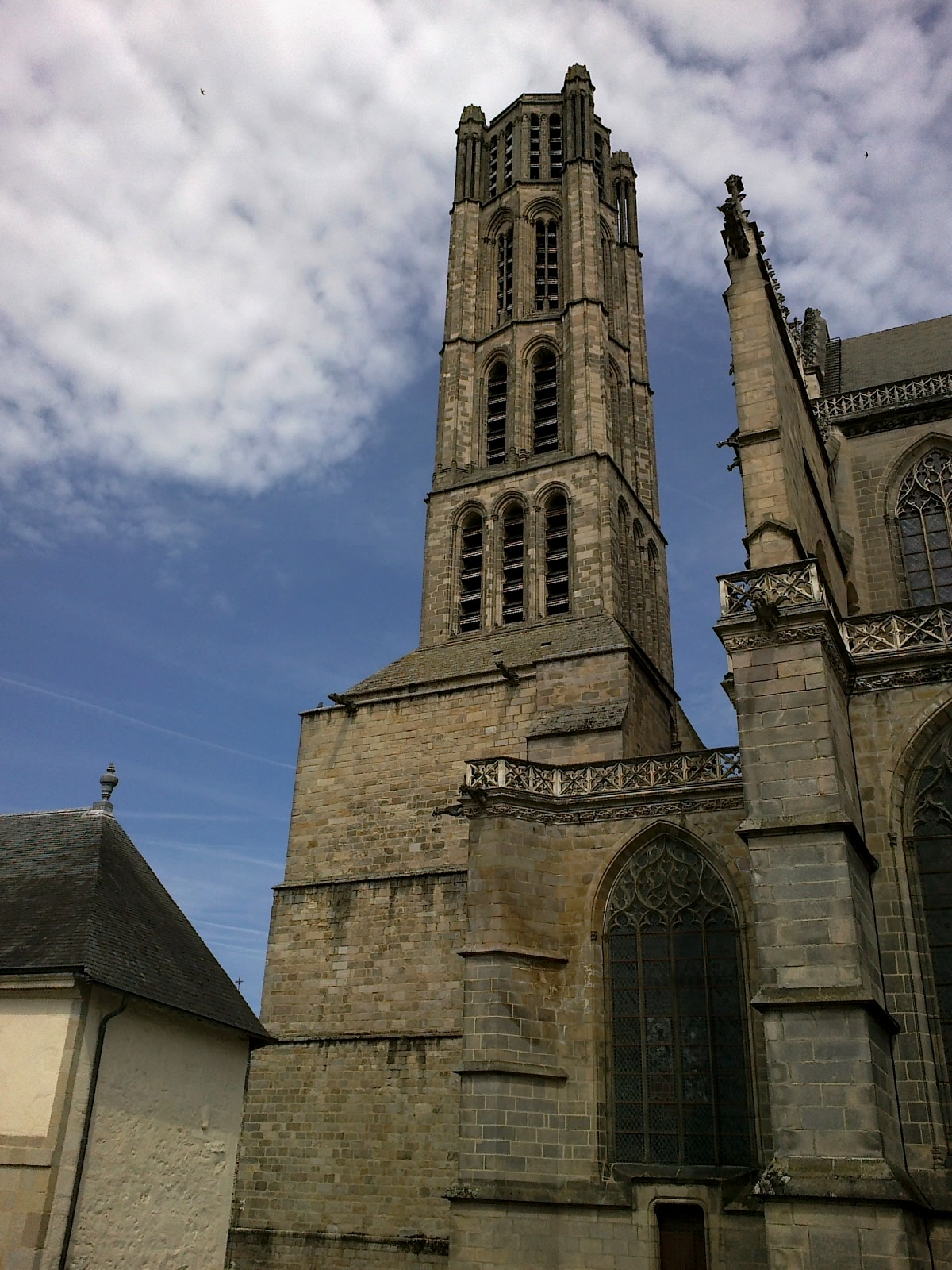
Junction of Romanesque bell tower with the Gothic church

The bell tower, sixty two meters high, is slightly off-centre toward the north. It was constructed for the Romanesque cathedral of the 11th century, which was demolished for construction of the Gothic church. A thick stone wall was constructed around its base in the 14th century, which covers the Romanesque windows. It permitted the construction of the top three levels Gothic levels of the tower. The first level of the tower is rectangular, while the upper Gothic levels are octagonal. The tower was given additional support by the construction of four octagonal contreforts at the four corners.

The tower had a rather dramatic history. In 1571 the wooden spire was struck by lightning, which started a fire, which spread to the belfry, melting the eleven bells. Five bells were cast again and installed in the belfry in 1575.

The tower is linked to the church by the porch of the narthex, a 19th-century addition. Its facade is decorated with two octagonal turrets, and it has a large rose window, as well as smaller rose windows in the gable.

=== Transepts and north portal ===
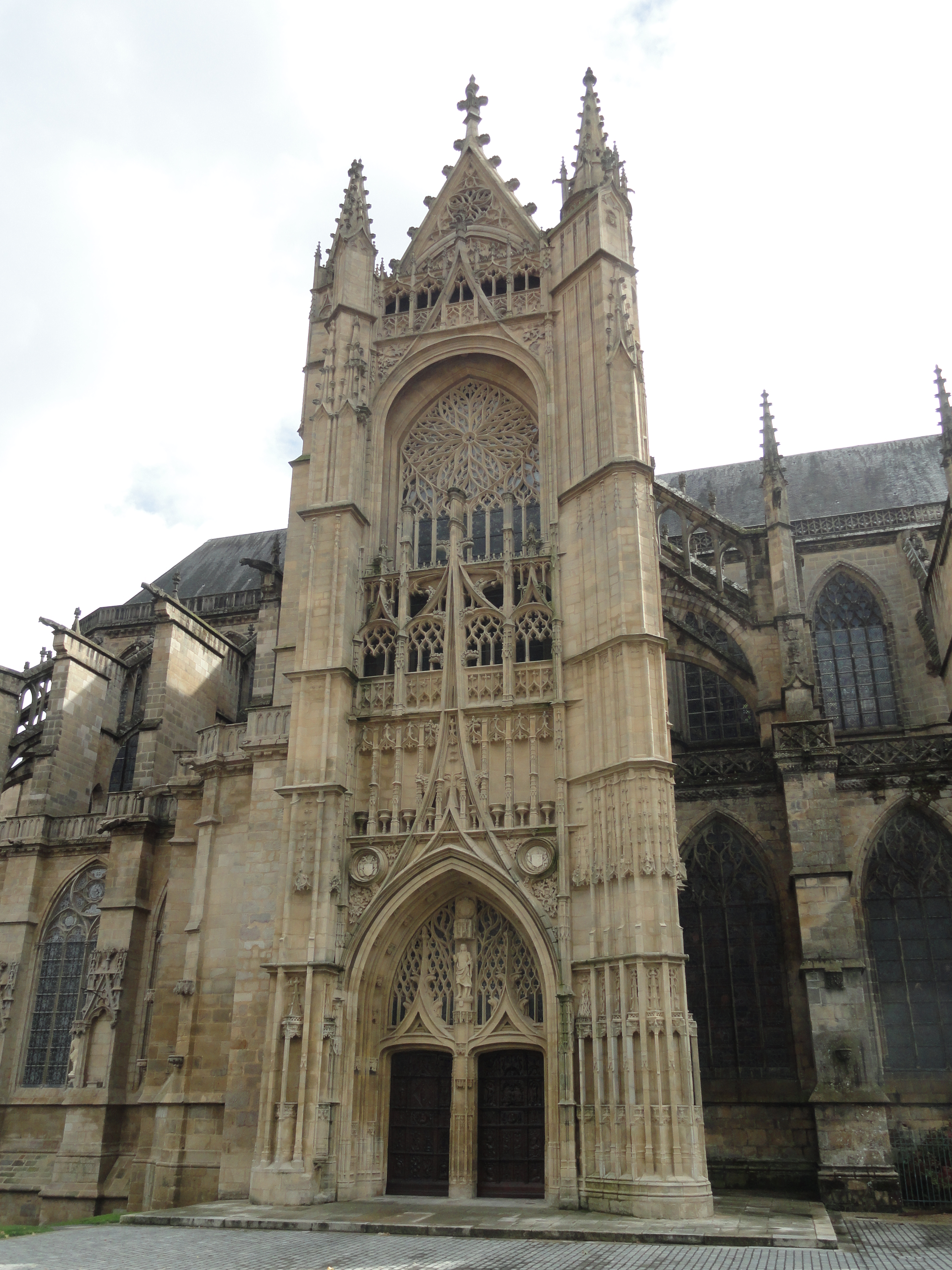
The north transept and portal of Saint John

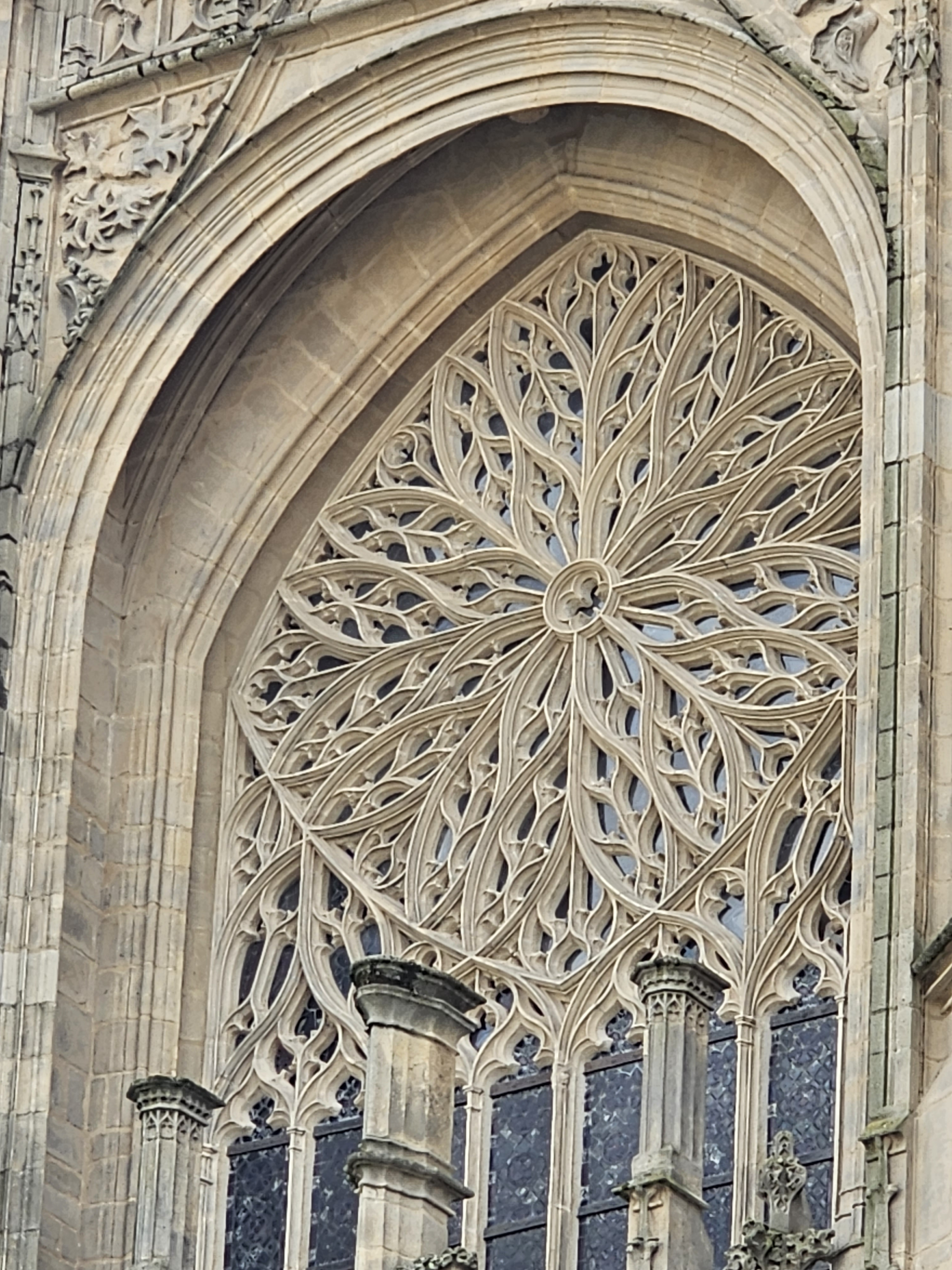
Flamboyant rose window of the portal of Saint John

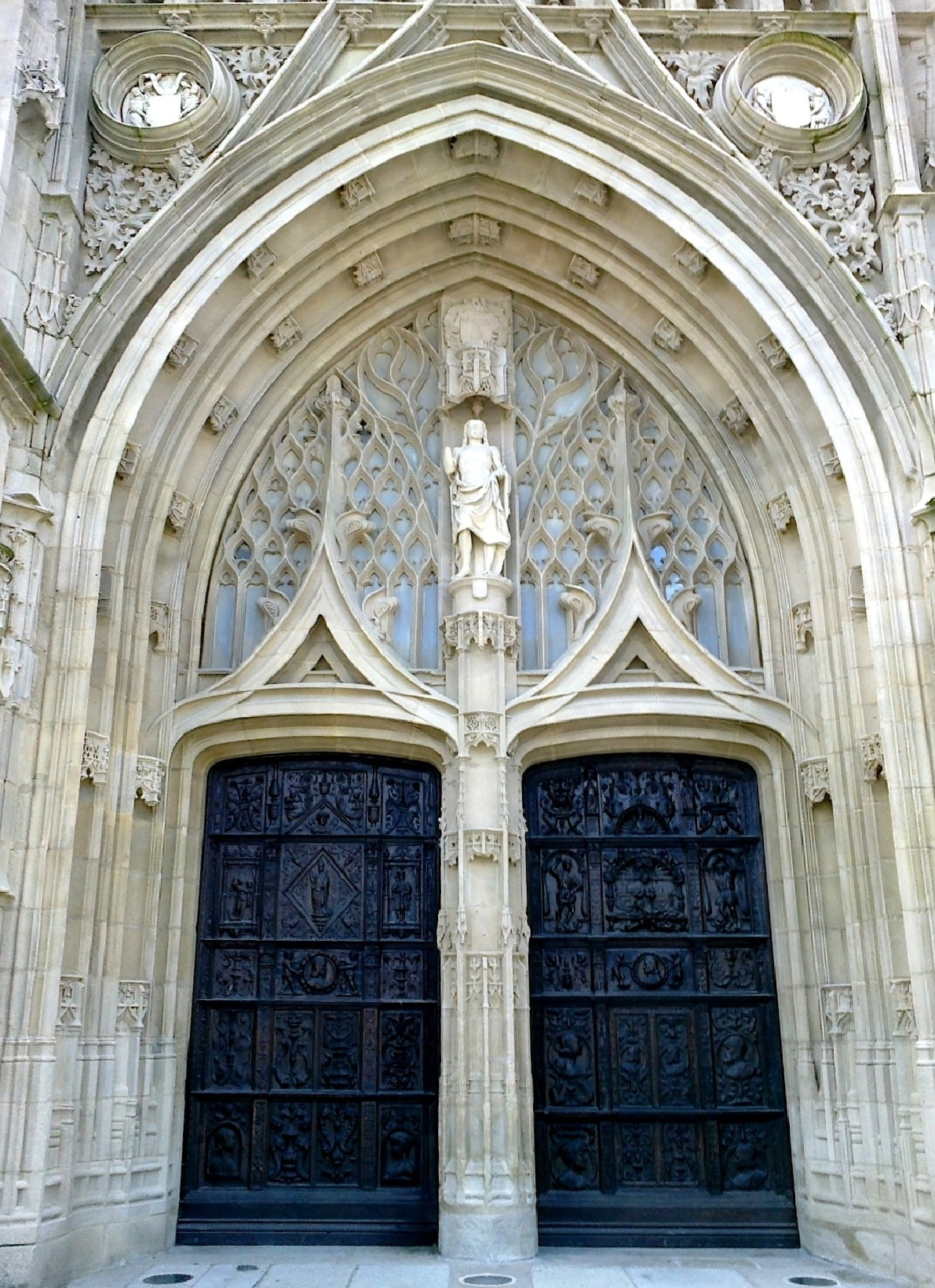
Doorway of the Portal of Saint John

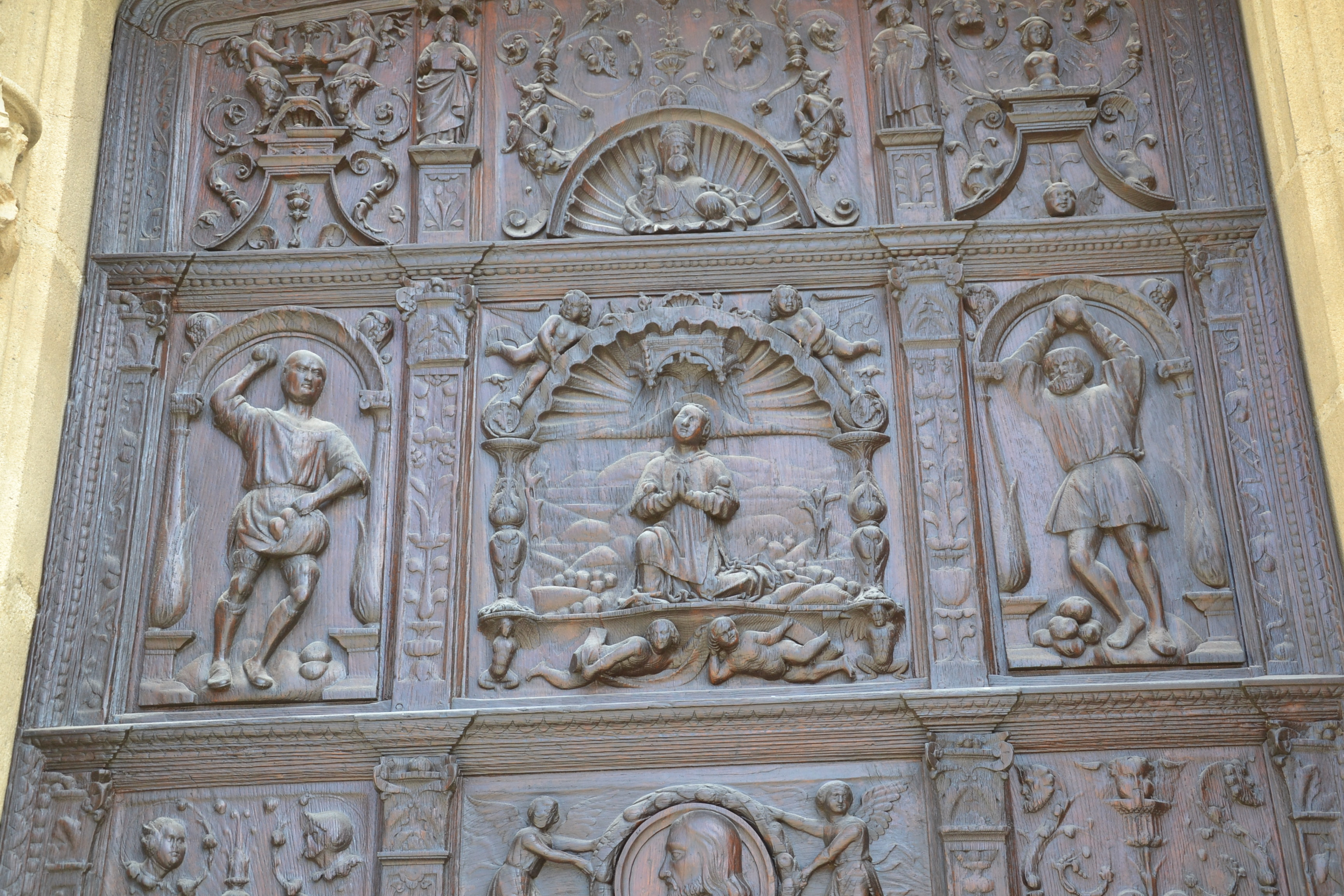
Detail of the north portal door, the Stoning of Saint Stephen

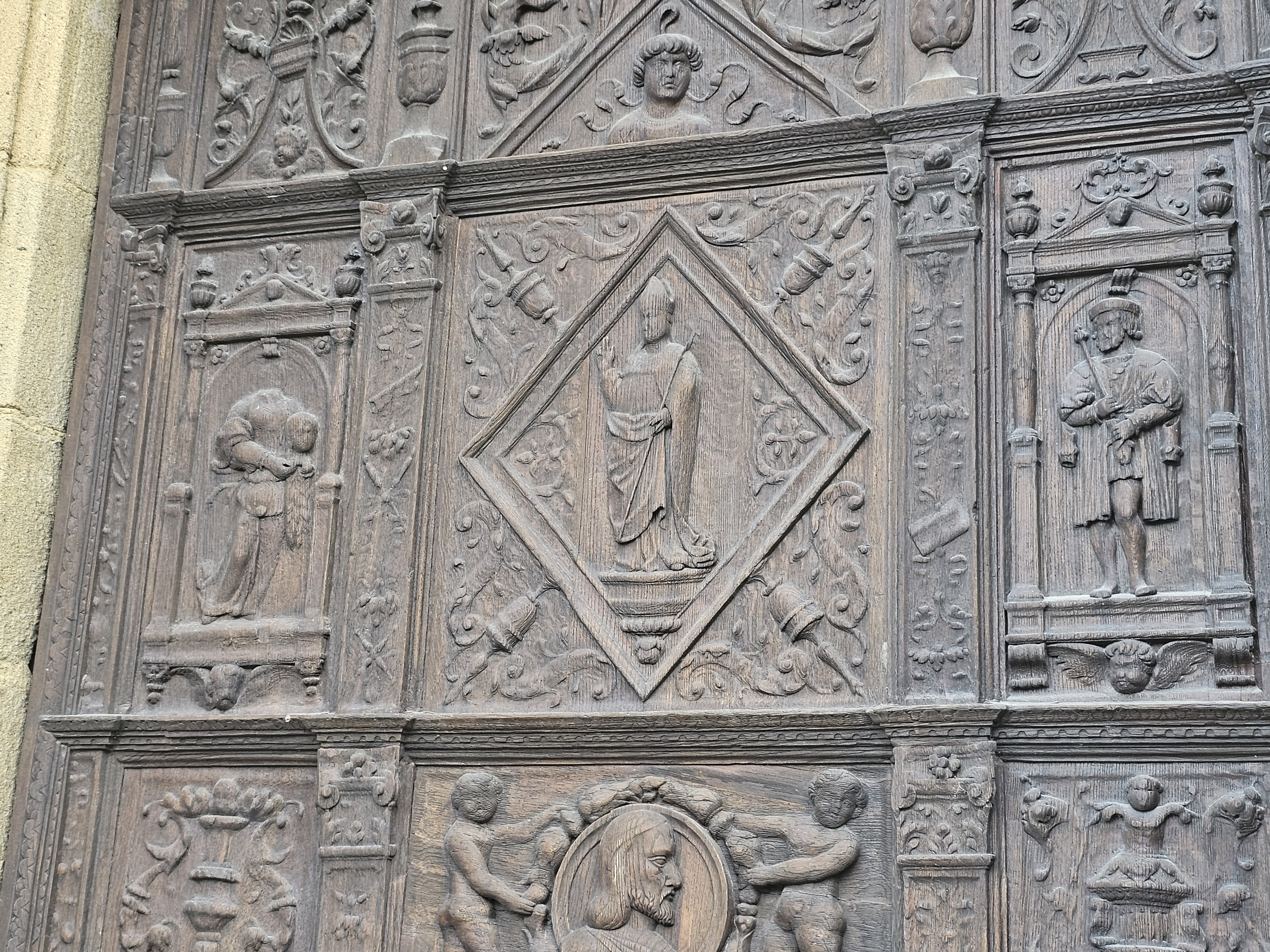
Detail of the north portal door, Saint Martial and Saint Valerie

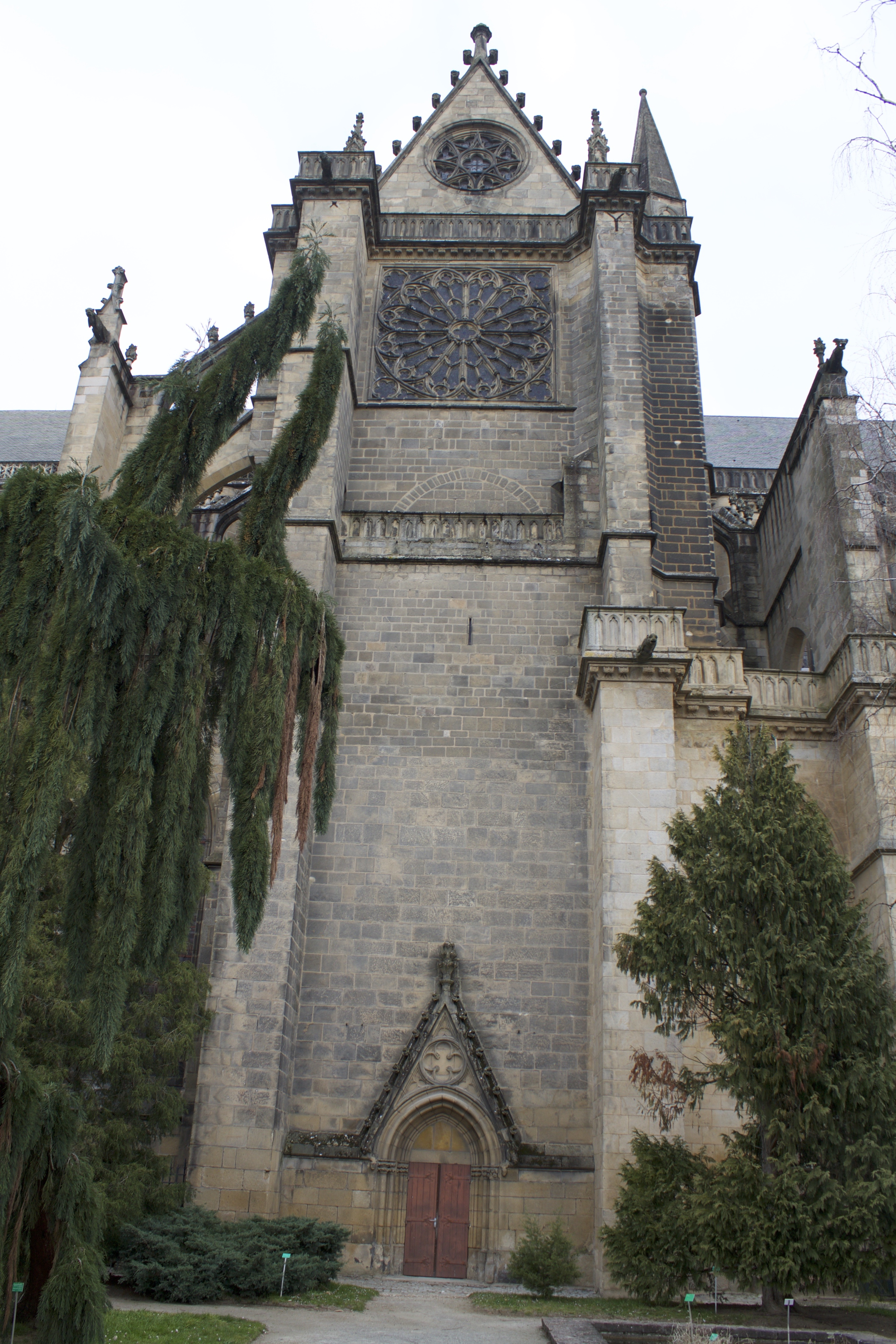
The South Transept

The Portal of Saint John, the north portal of the transept, is the main entrance of the church. It was built between 1516 and 1530, and is considered one of the masterpieces of the Flamboyant Gothic style.

== Interior ==
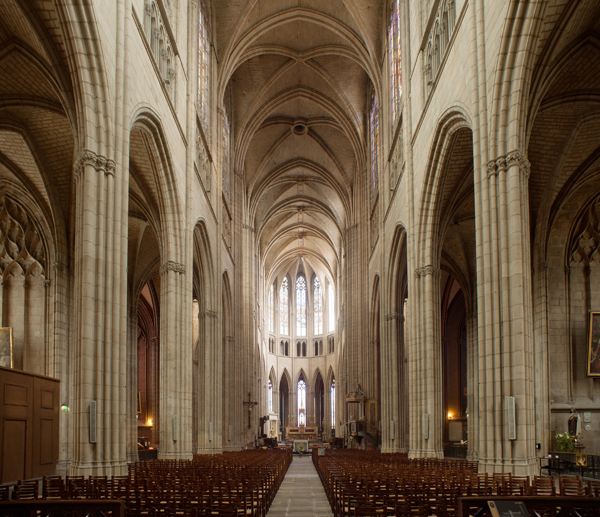
The nave looking toward the choir

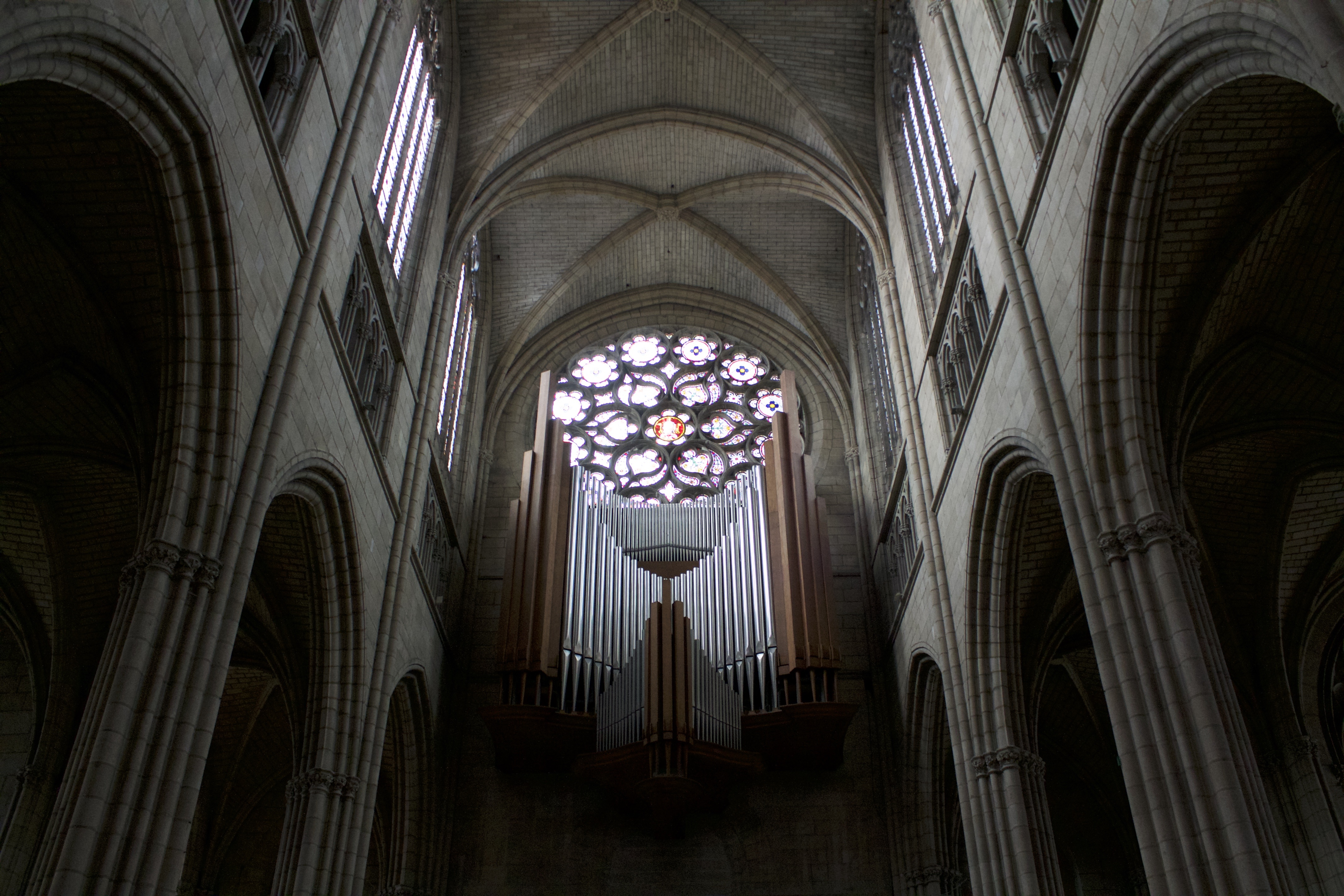
The nave looking toward the rose window and organ

=== Romanesque porch and narthex ===
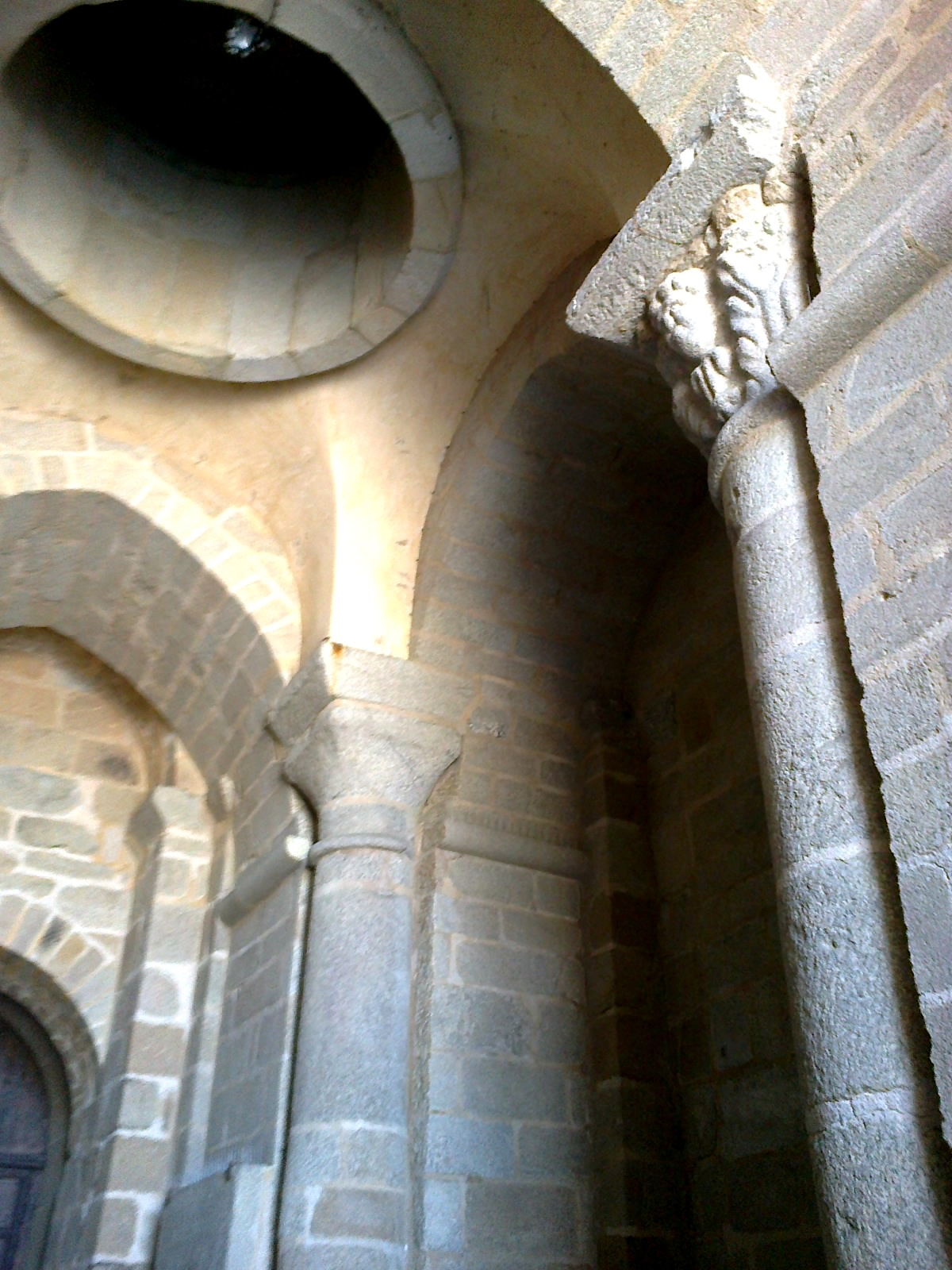
Interior of the bell tower, with oculus for hoisting the bells to the belfry.

The traditional entrance to the church is through the Romanesque bell tower, which is on the north side of the Gothic church, aligned with the old Romanesque church. The porch is a square created by four massive pillars on the angles, joined by rounded Romanesque arches, and, in the center, four large columns with Gothic capitals and pointed arches. In the center of the ceiling is a large circular oculus through which the bells could be hoisted to the belfry of the tower.

== Rood screen ==
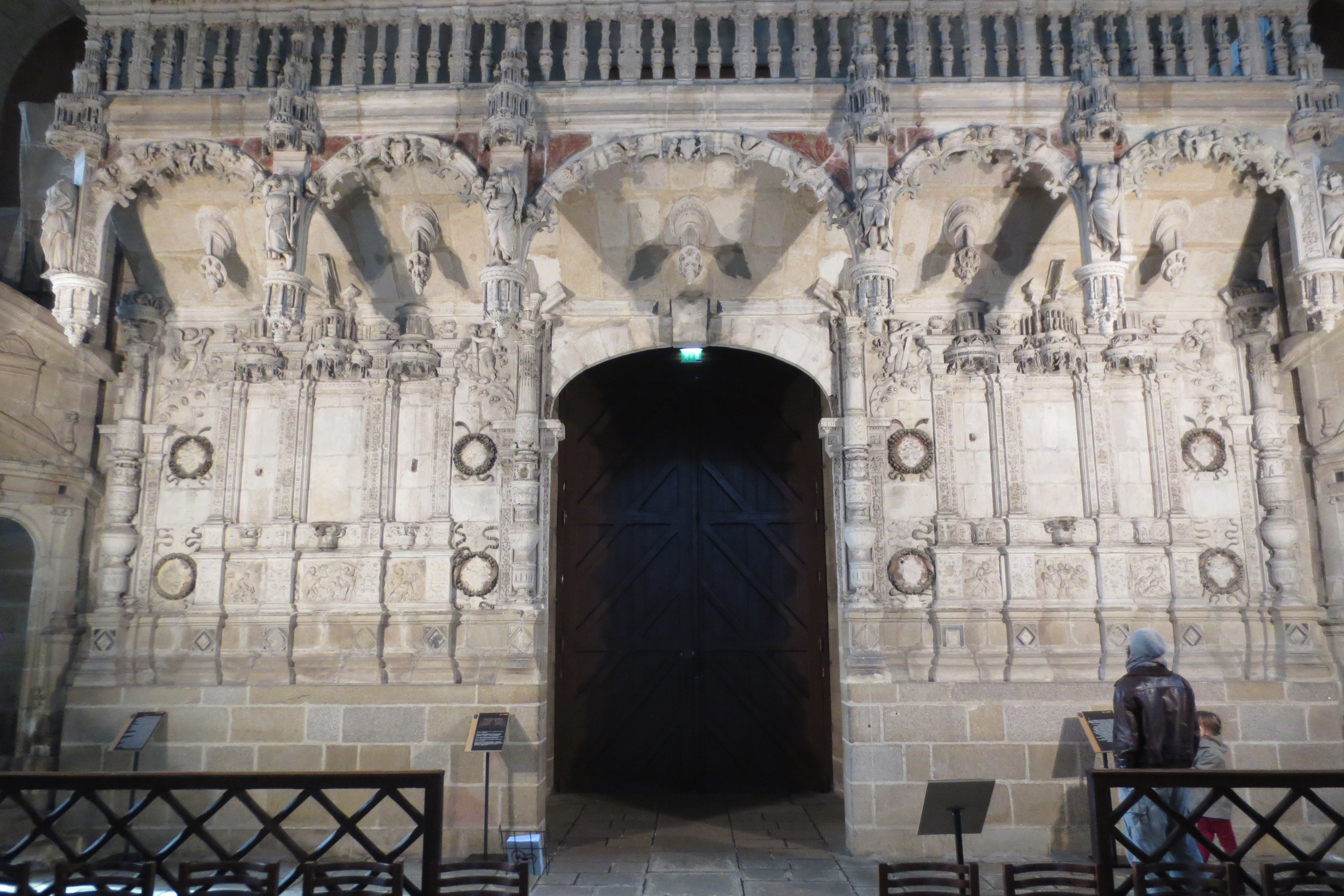
The rood screen (1533–1534)

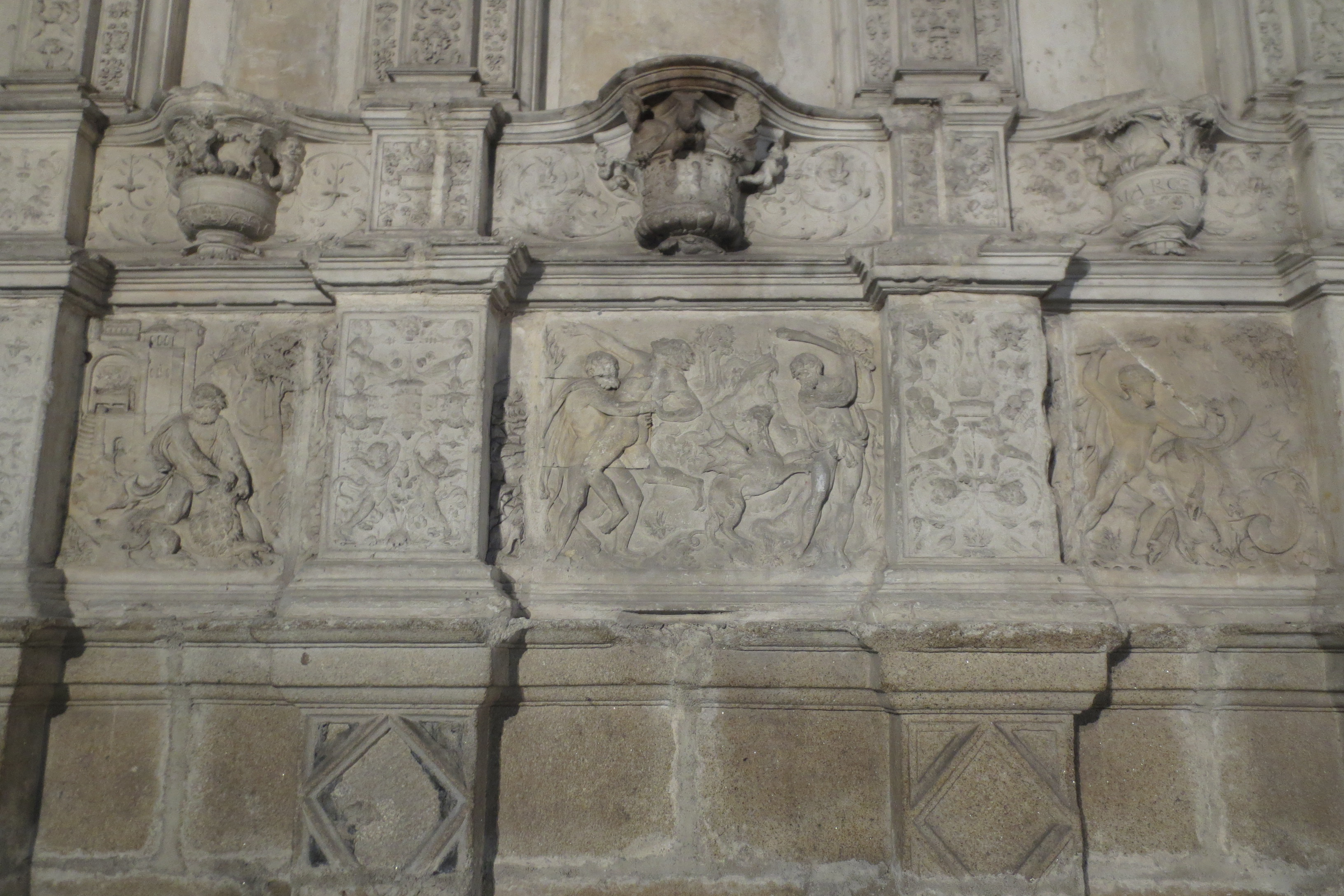
Detail of the rood screen - the Labors of Hercules

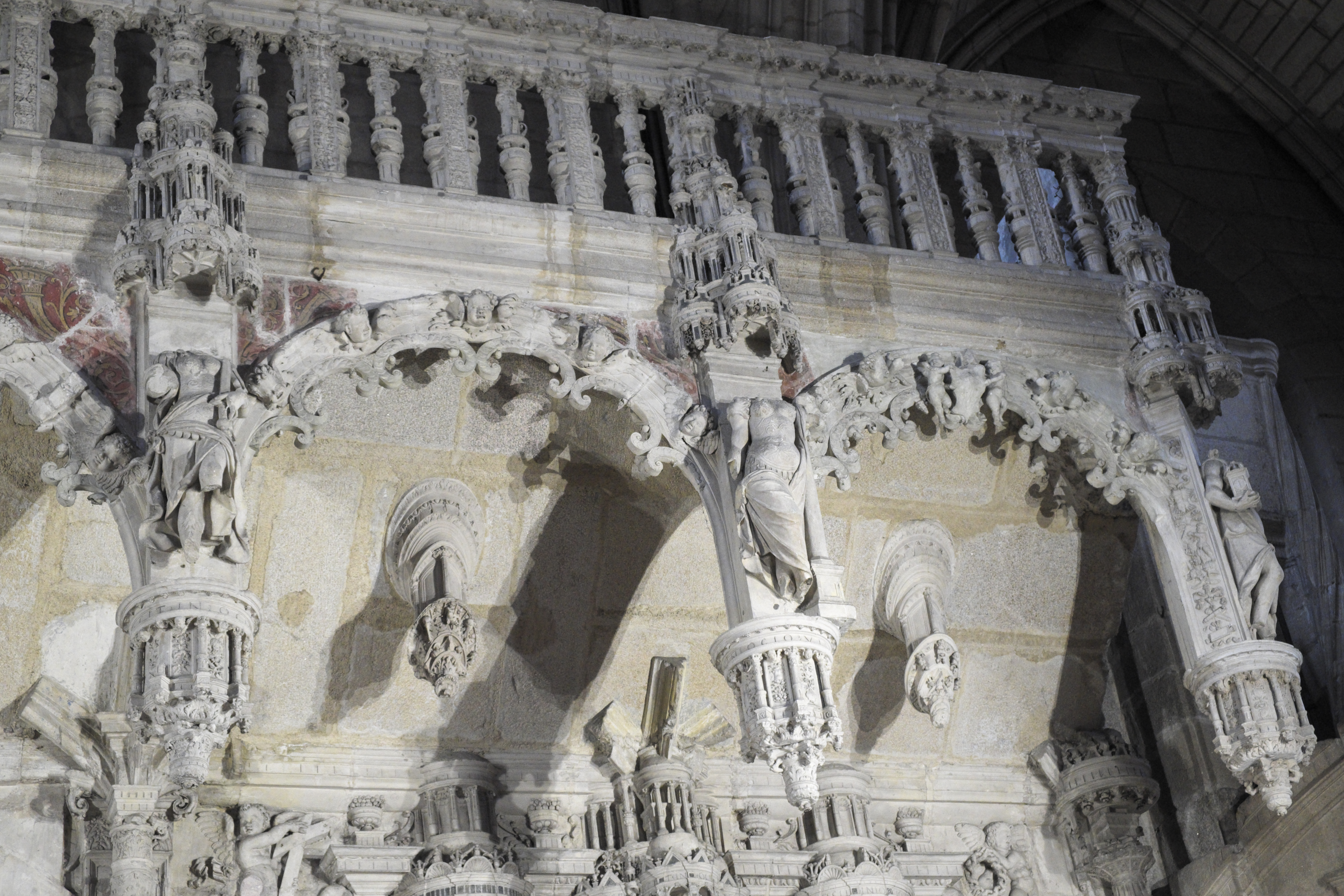
Allegorical figures on the rood screen

The most prominent interior decoration is the Renaissance Rood Screen, which originally separated the choir from the nave. It is one of the rare rood screens still existing in France. It was made between 1533 and 1534, and was then ornamented with sculpture by Jean Arnaud in 1536. It was mutilated in 1793 during the French Revolution, and moved in 1888 to its present location the end of nave.

The elaborate Renaissance sculpture on the rood screen is largely devoted to ancient and mythological themes, particularly the exploits of Hercules. The decorative elements are in the Italian style, and feature putti, arabesques. vases and sculpted vegetation.

== Chapels and treasury ==
Chapels in the ambulatory

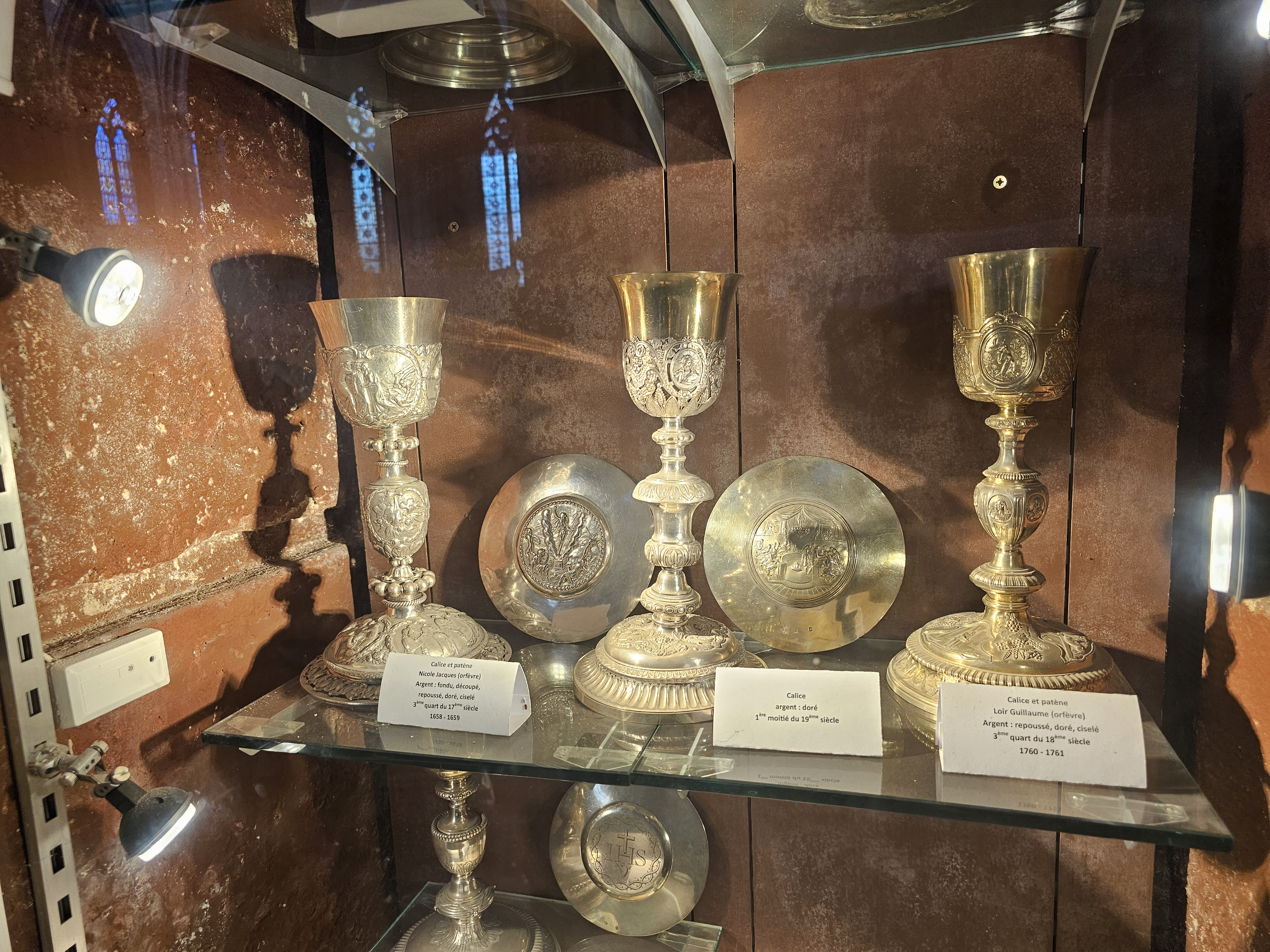
Liturgical objects in the cathedral treasury

Twenty chapels are placed around the periphery of the nave and the disambulatory of the choir. The baptistry chapel has fonts placed in 1865, with a statue of John the Baptist. The chapel of Saint Valerie corresponds with the original oratory of Saint Martial. Excavations in that chapel in 2005 discovered an altar table probably from the pre-Romanesque period. The apse chapels also display the remains of paintings from the 14th century; these include paintings scenes of the life of the Virgin and the legend of Saint Catherine in the chapel o Saint Leonard; and in the chapel of Saint Germaine a painting of the appearance of Christ to Saint Germaine.

The vaults of the choir are decorated with a painting of angel-musicians, but most if the paintings in the choir date to the 19th century. they are works by Charles Petiniaud-Dubos, a local painter, made in 1844. Louis Charles Auguste Steinheil designed the windows. The chapel of the Virgin was decorated in 1859 by Alexandre Denuelle.

Liturgical works from the cathedral treasury are displayed in the sacristy, in the chapel closest to the south arm of the transept. The works on display include two altar canons attributed to Nicolas Laudin, known for his enamel work in the 17the century, and a group of calyces and patents from the 17th to 19th century. It also displays a monumental altar painting from the 13th century.

== Crypt ==
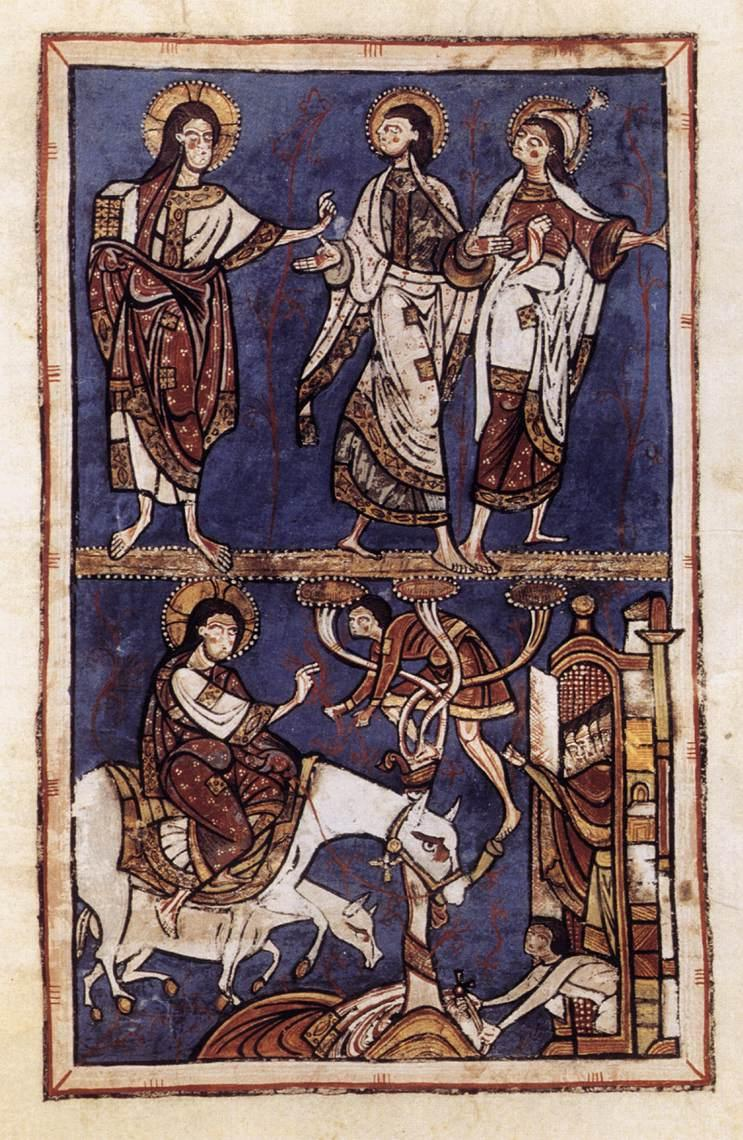
"Entry into Jerusalem" Miniature illuminated manuscript from cathedral crypt (12th c.)

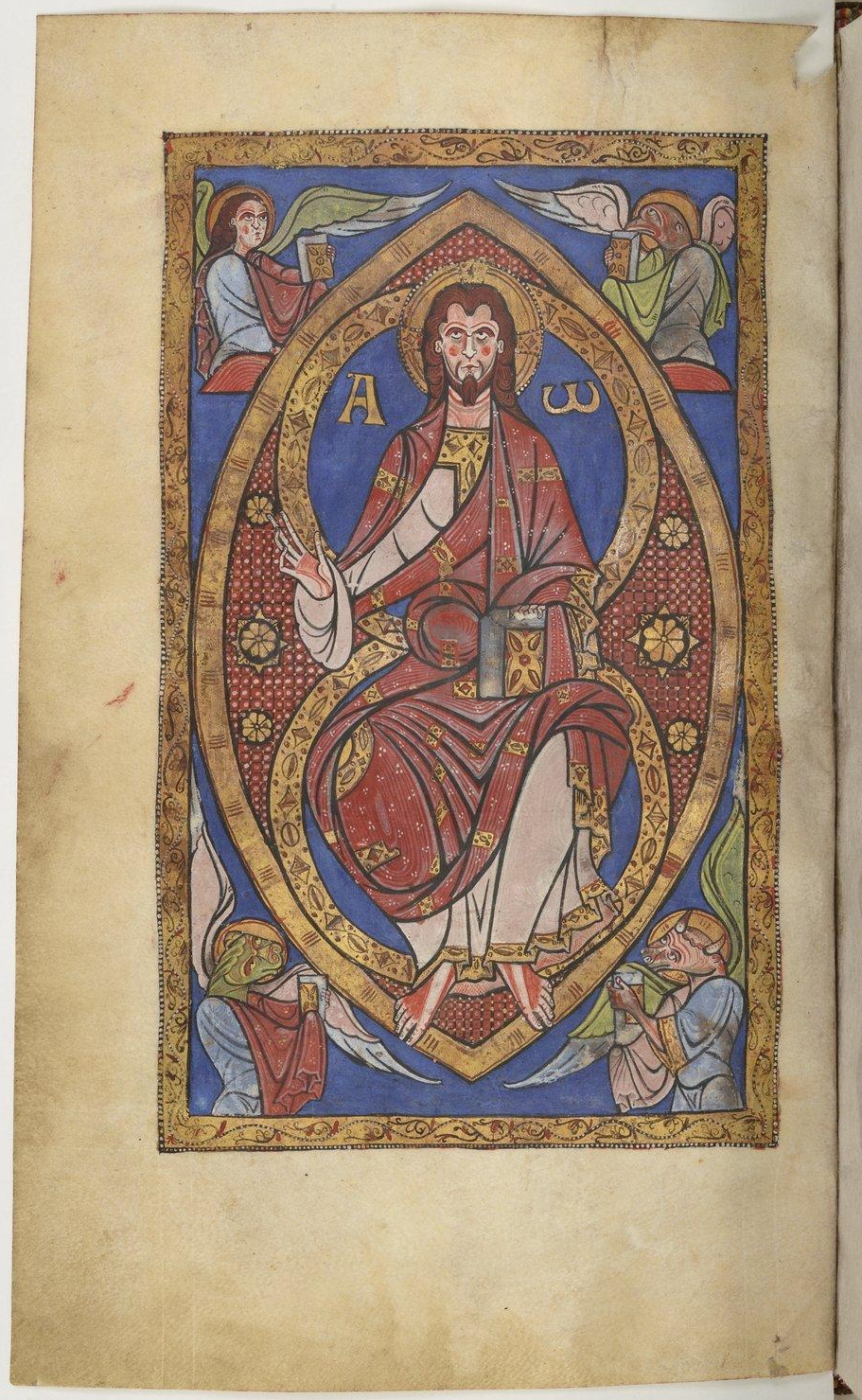
Miniature illustration from crypt of Limoges Cathedral (13th century)

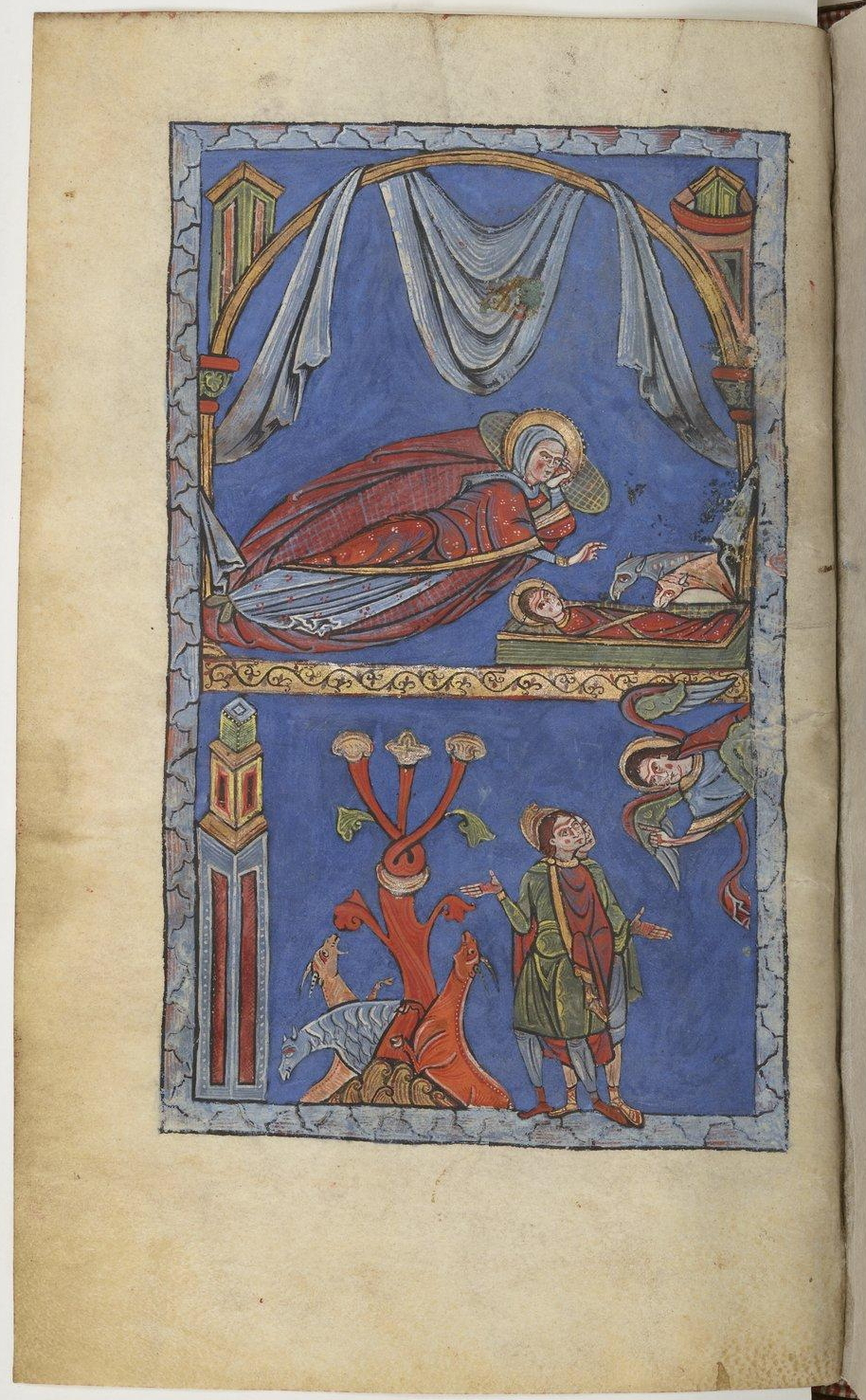
Miniature illustration from the crypt of the cathedral (13th century)

The crypt was built by bishop Alduin in 1013 on the lower three floors of the bell tower. As of 2024, it was not open to the public. It was largely filled with earth during the Gothic period to stabilize the upper floors of the tower, and was badly preserved. The crypt was decorated with a number of murals from the 11th century, of which only traces remain.

The walls of the Romanesque crypt have the remains of frescoes representing Christ in glory. Several medieval paintings are visible in the chapels, including a painting of angelic musicians, but almost all the frescoes are from the 19th century.

== Organs ==
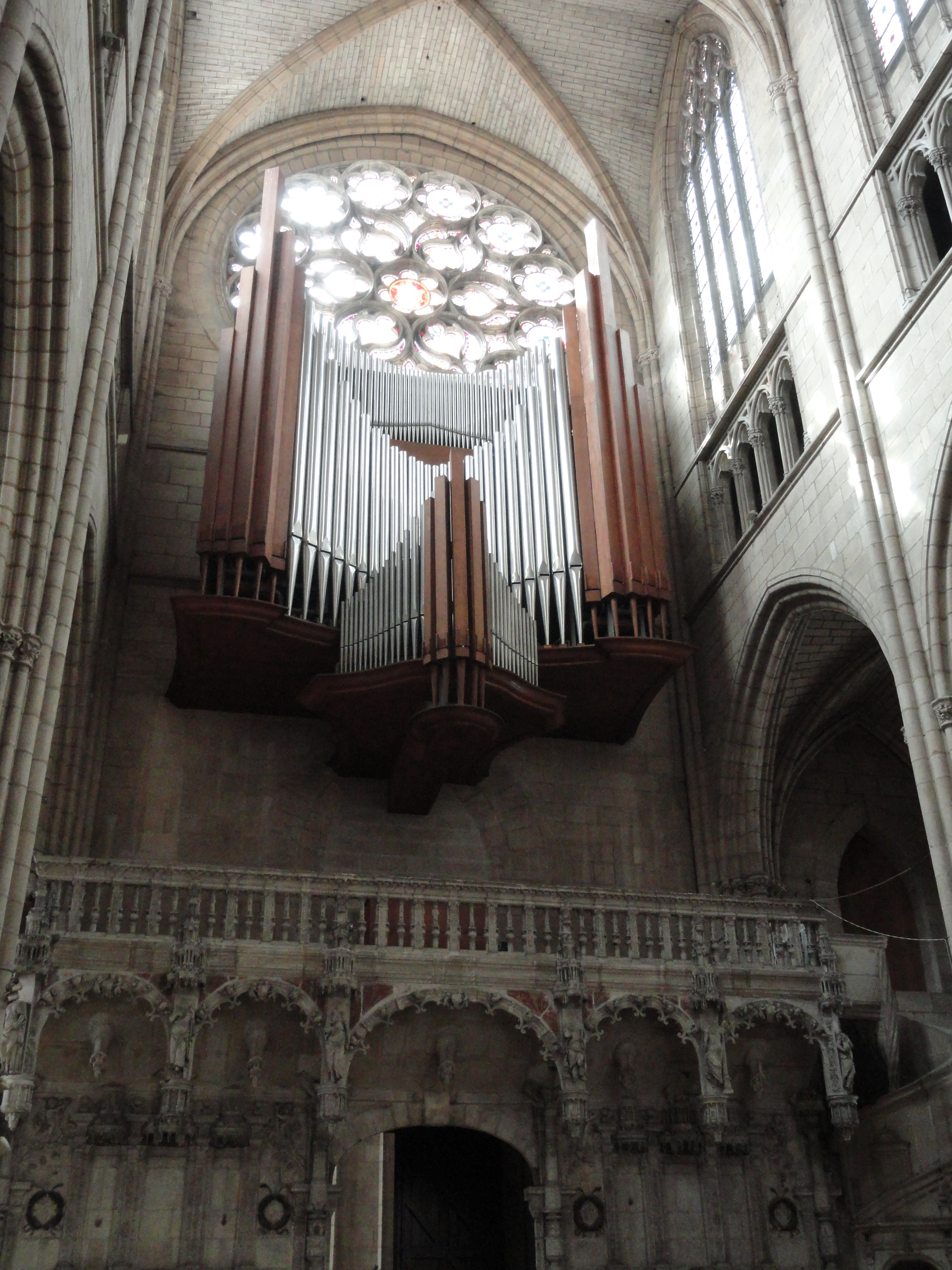
The Tribune Organ

Limoges Cathedral has two organs: a modern neoclassical instrument built by Georges Danion in 1963, and an older choir organ installed in 1851 and restored in 1891 by Merklin. Every summer, the cathedral association organizes concerts involving the organ.

The main organ is located in the tribune at the west end of the nave. It was built in the Neo-classical style by Georges Danion and Gonzalez in 1963. It replaced an organ made by Ducrorquet in 1842. The buffet of the original organ is still in place. The 1963 organ underwent major rebuilding in 1986, and further work in 1992–1994 and in 2022–2023.

The main organ has three keyboards with a total of 61 notes, and a 32-note pedalboard.

The earlier, smaller instrument is located in the choir. It was built by Ducroquet in 1850, and has been updated several times. Both organs were on the list of protected French historic sites and objects in August 1991.

== Tombs ==
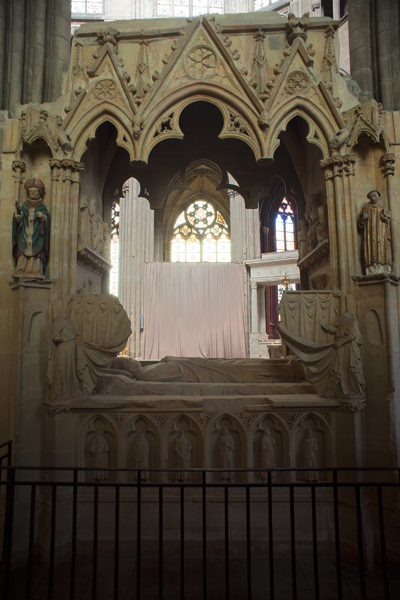
Tomb of Bishop Raymond de la Porte (1294–1316)

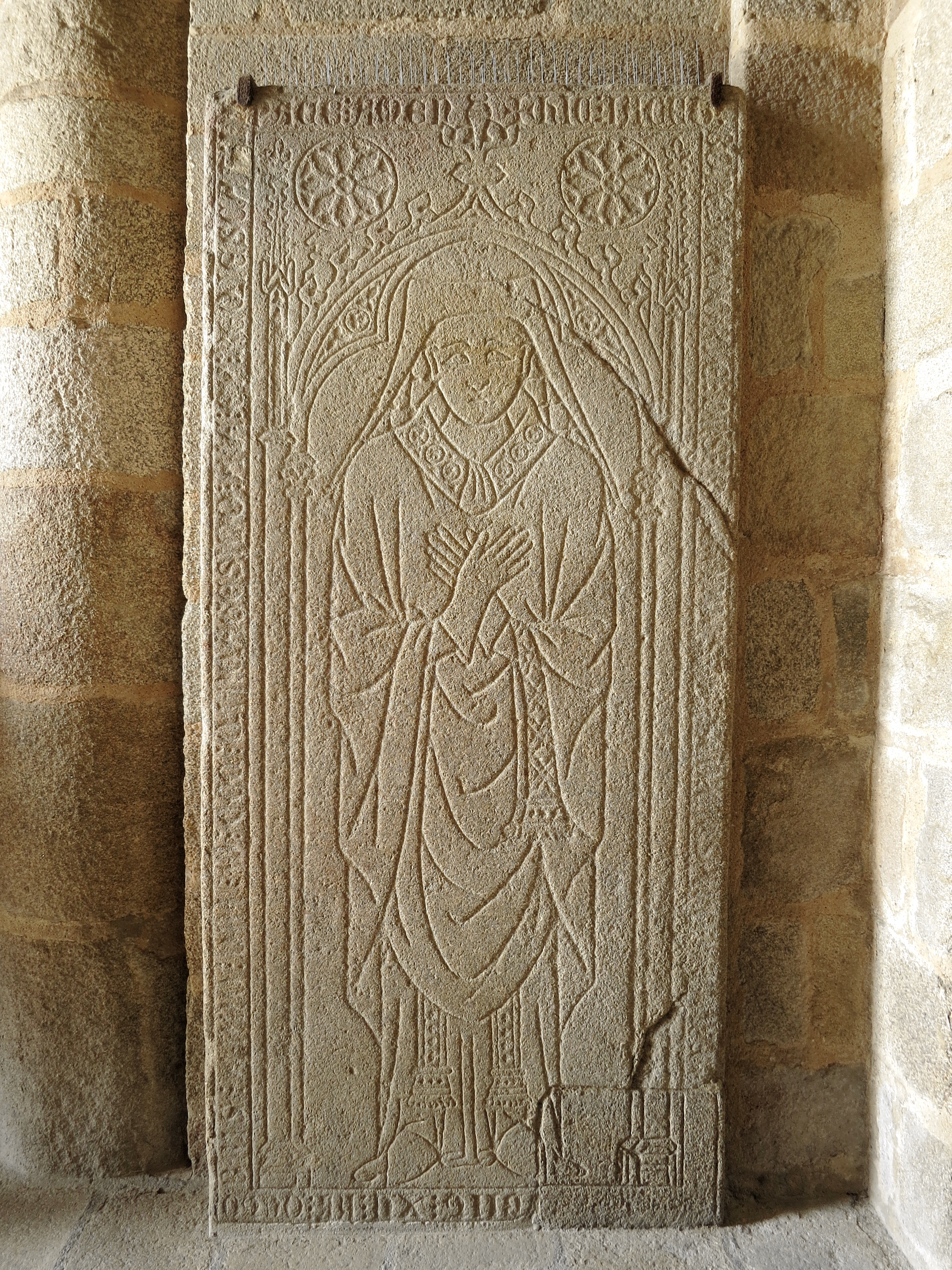
Tombstone of cathedral Canon Raymond de Saint-Crepin (14th c.)

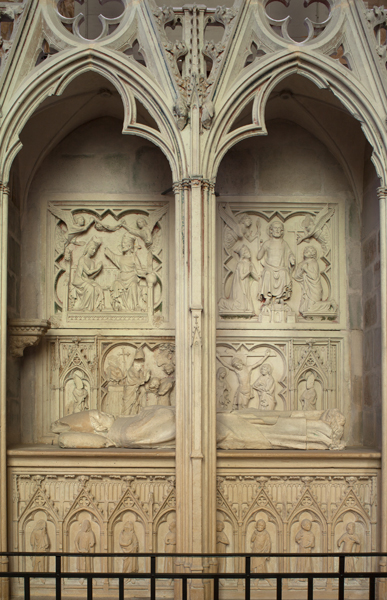
Tomb of Bishop Bernard Brun (died 1350)

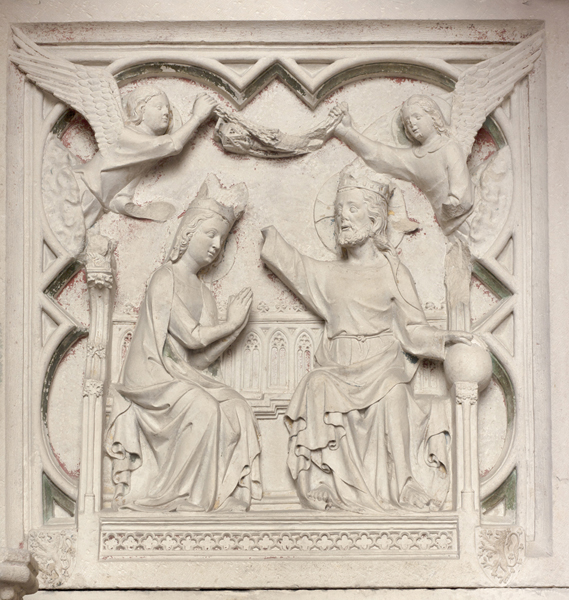
Detail of tomb of Bernard Brun (1350)

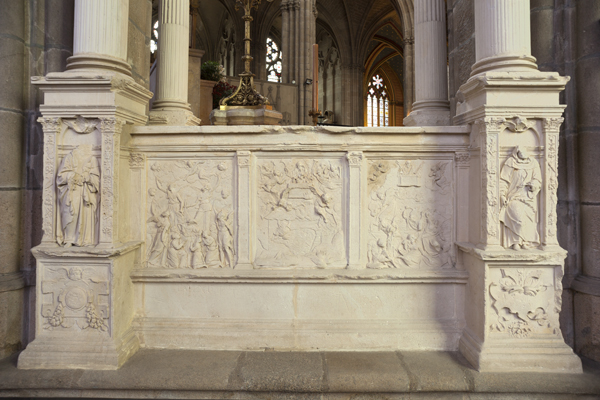
Detail of the Renaissance-style tomb of Bishop Jean de Langeac (1544)

The church has a number of tombs dating back to its early history. highly decorated with sculpture, The largest is the tombsof Raymond de la Porte, Bishop of Limoges (1294–1316), originally polychrome. with a collection of statues.

The tomb of Bishop Jean de Langeac (died in 1544) is a notable example of Renaissance sculpture. remaining work includes four columns with sculpted Corinthian capitals, and four panels in bas-relief illustrating the Apocalypse inspired by the works of Durer. During the French Revolution, the heads of most of the figures on the tombs were smashed, but some survived.

=== Sculpture ===
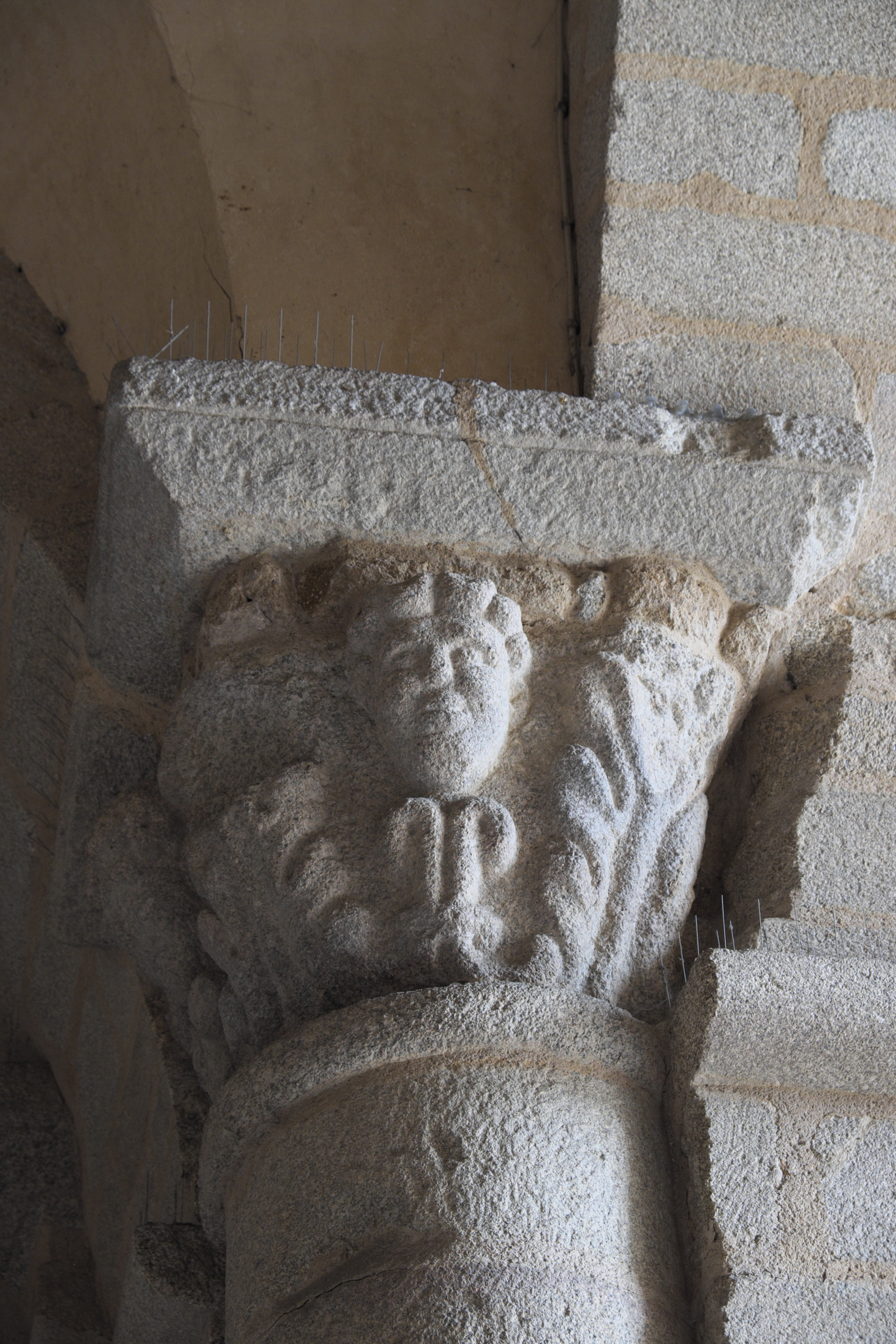
Romanesque column capital on the porch of the bell tower

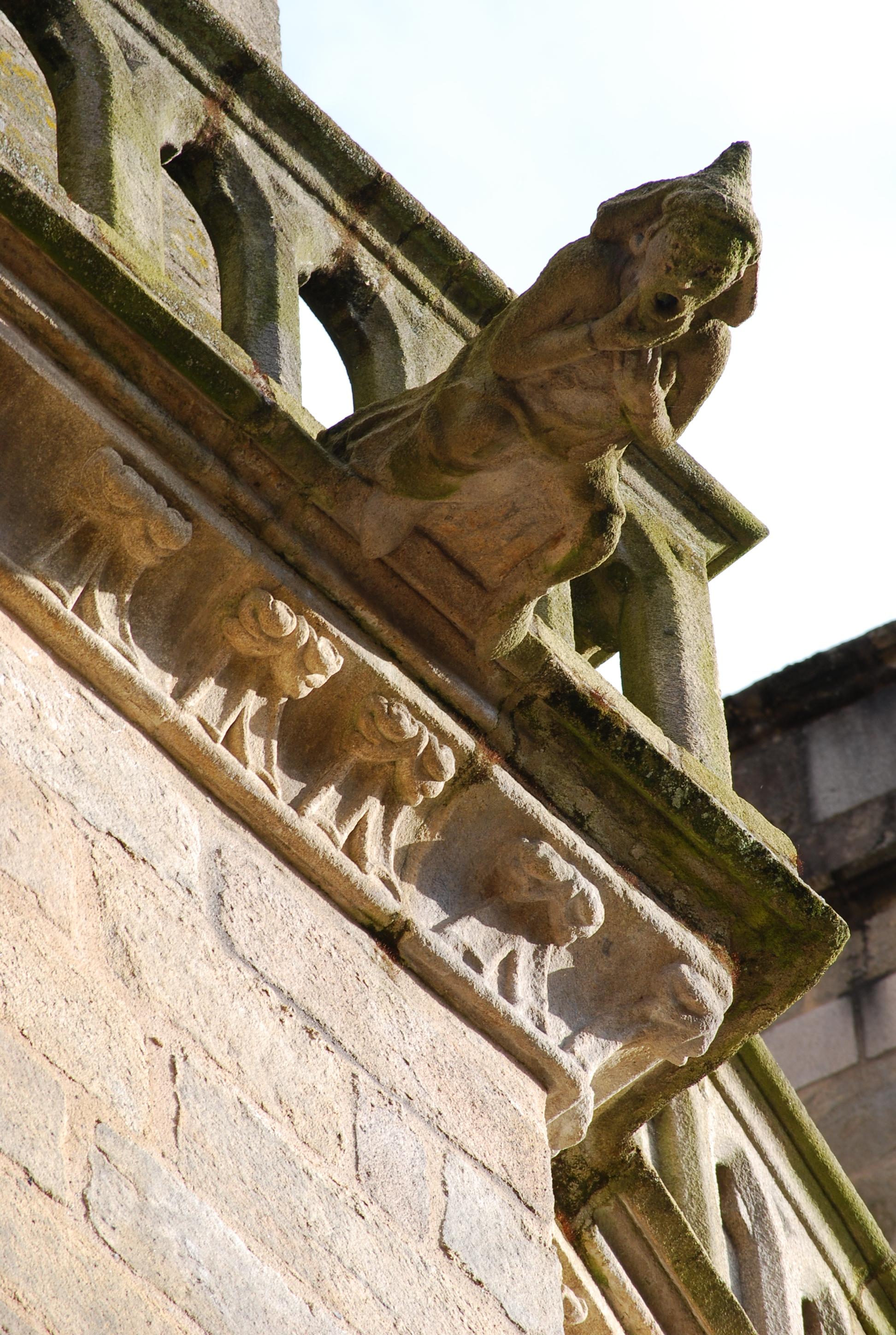
Gargoyle on the bell tower

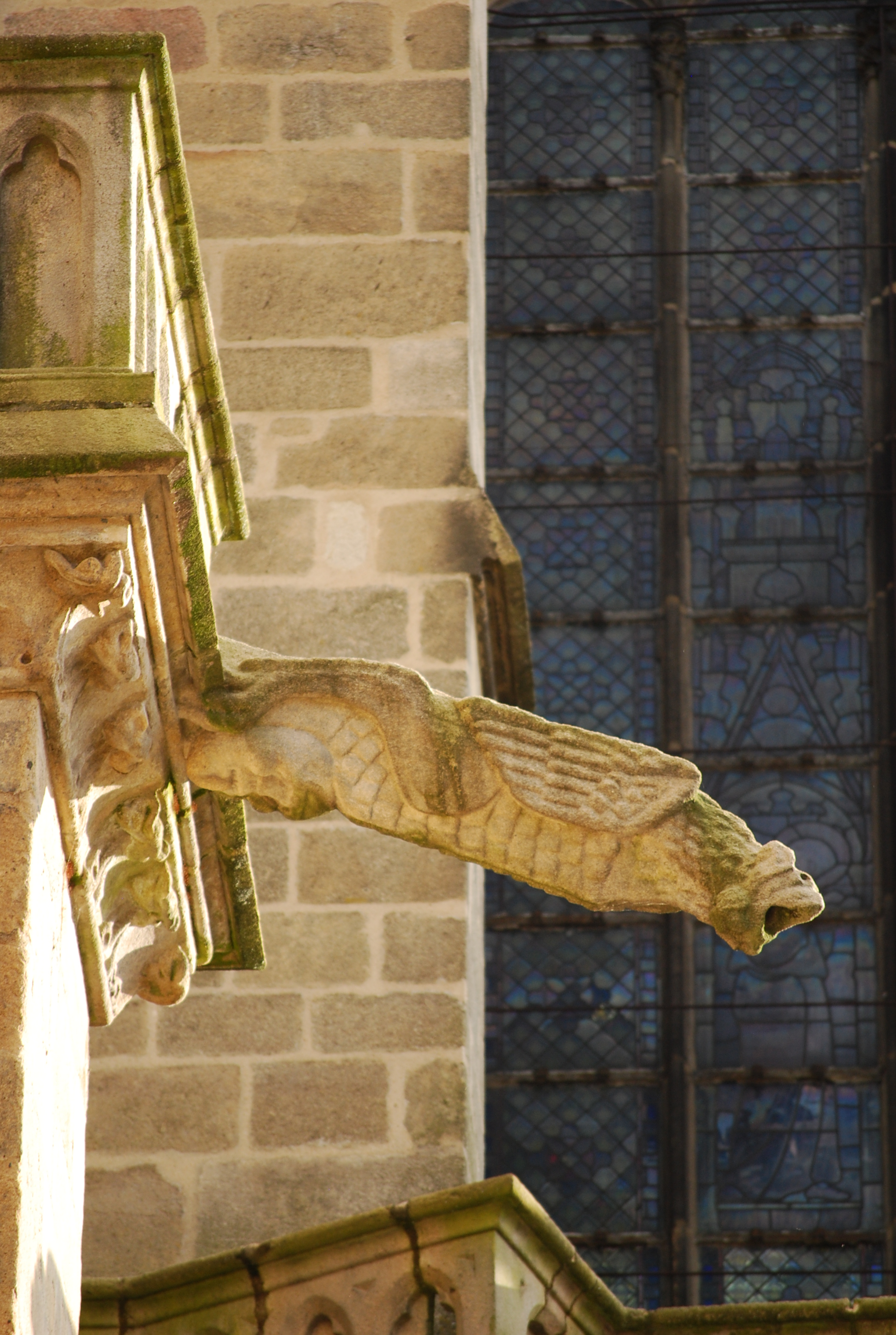
A gargoyle on the tower

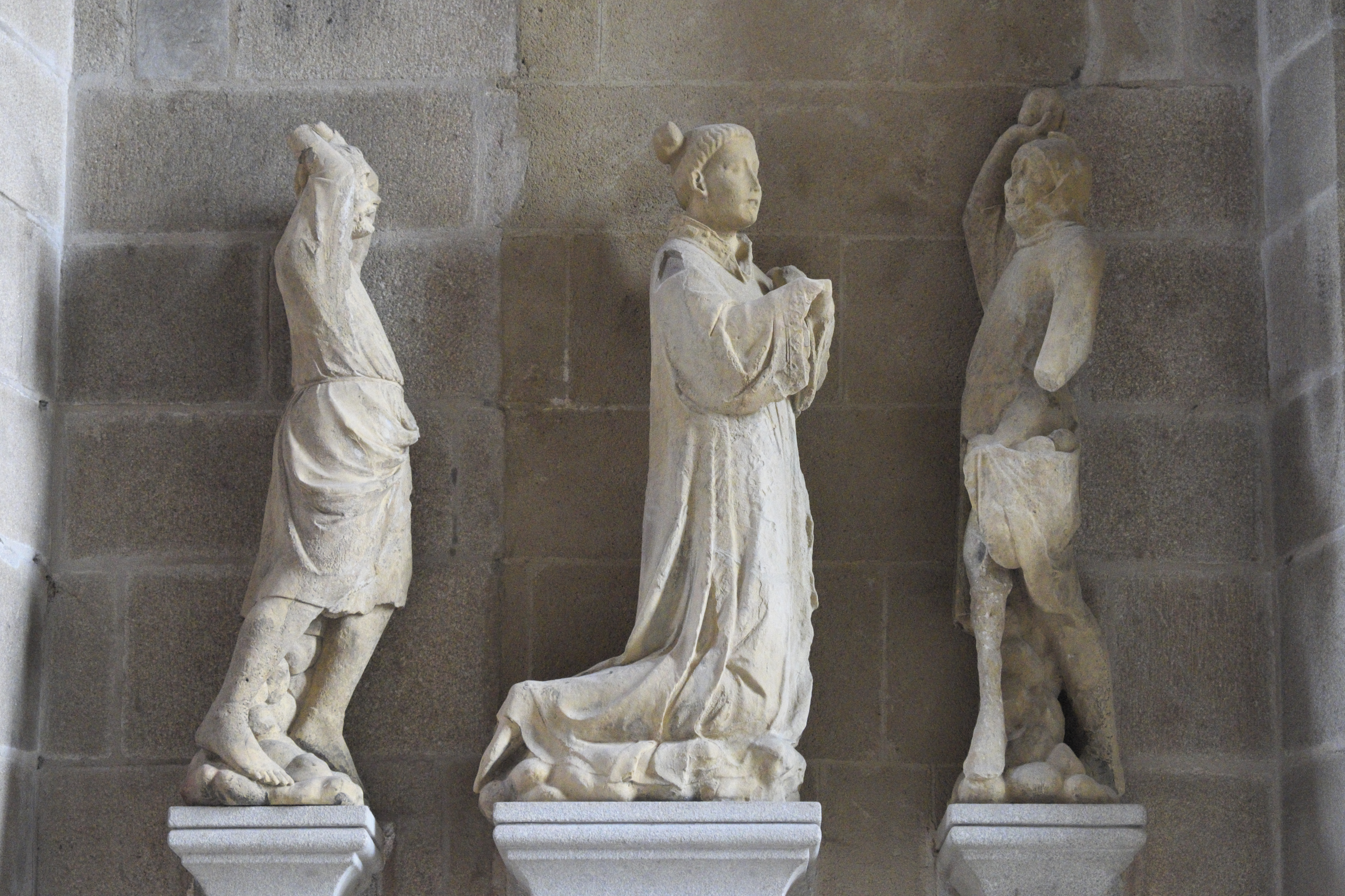
"The Martyrdom of Saint Stephen" (14th century)

== Stained glass ==
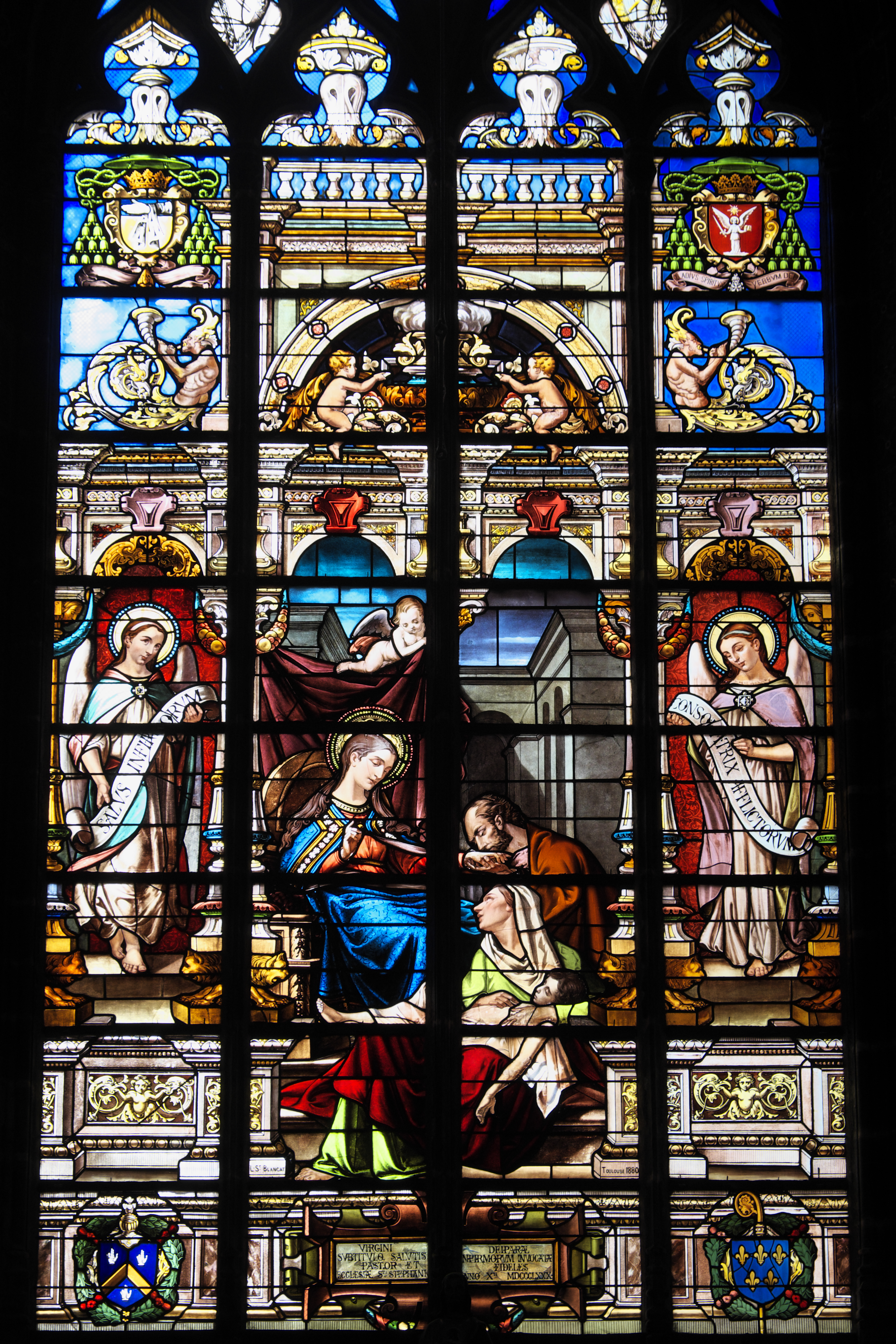
19th century window with some panes from the 16th c.

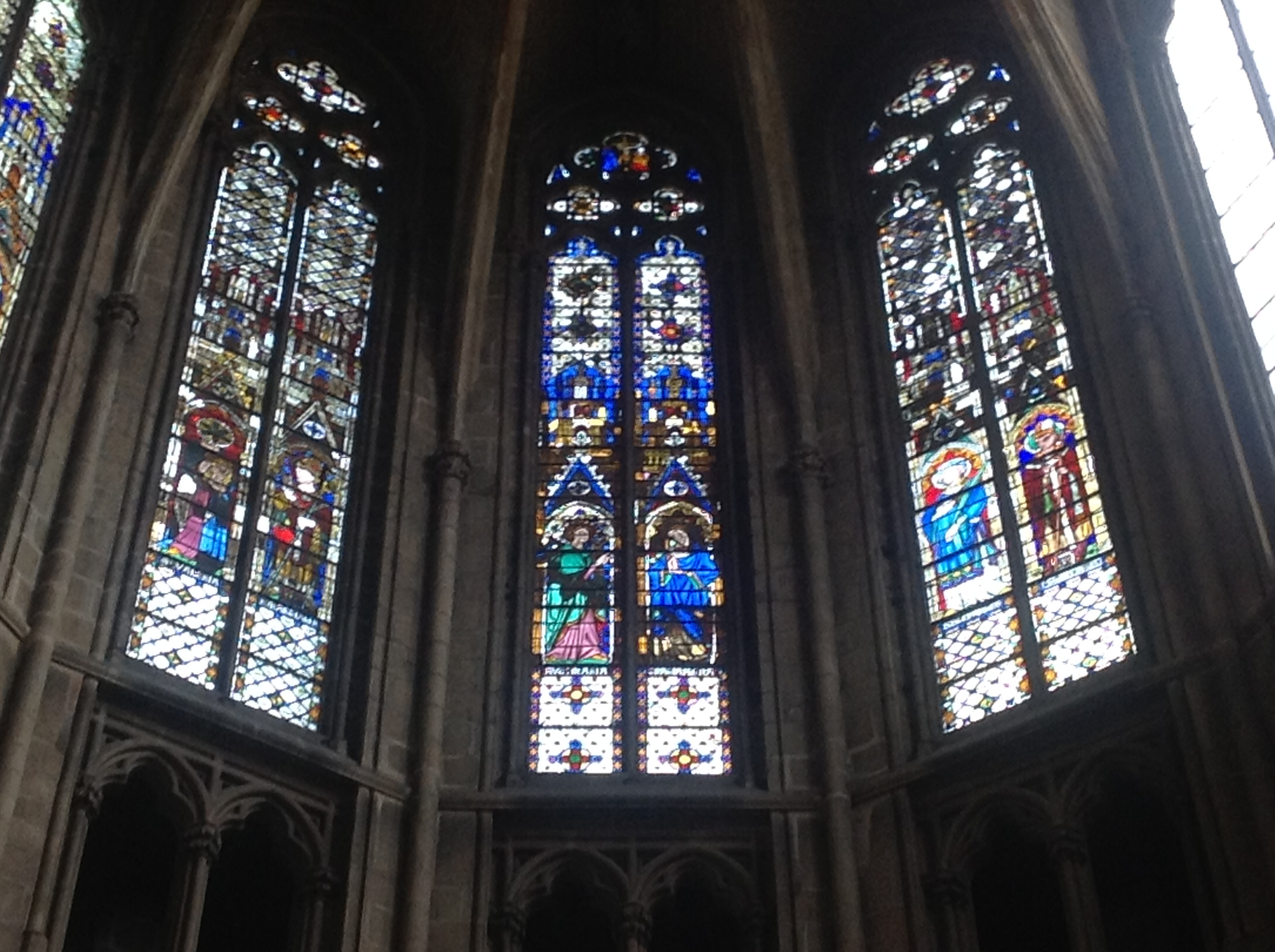
Apse windows depicting Saint Martial and Sainte Valérie among others

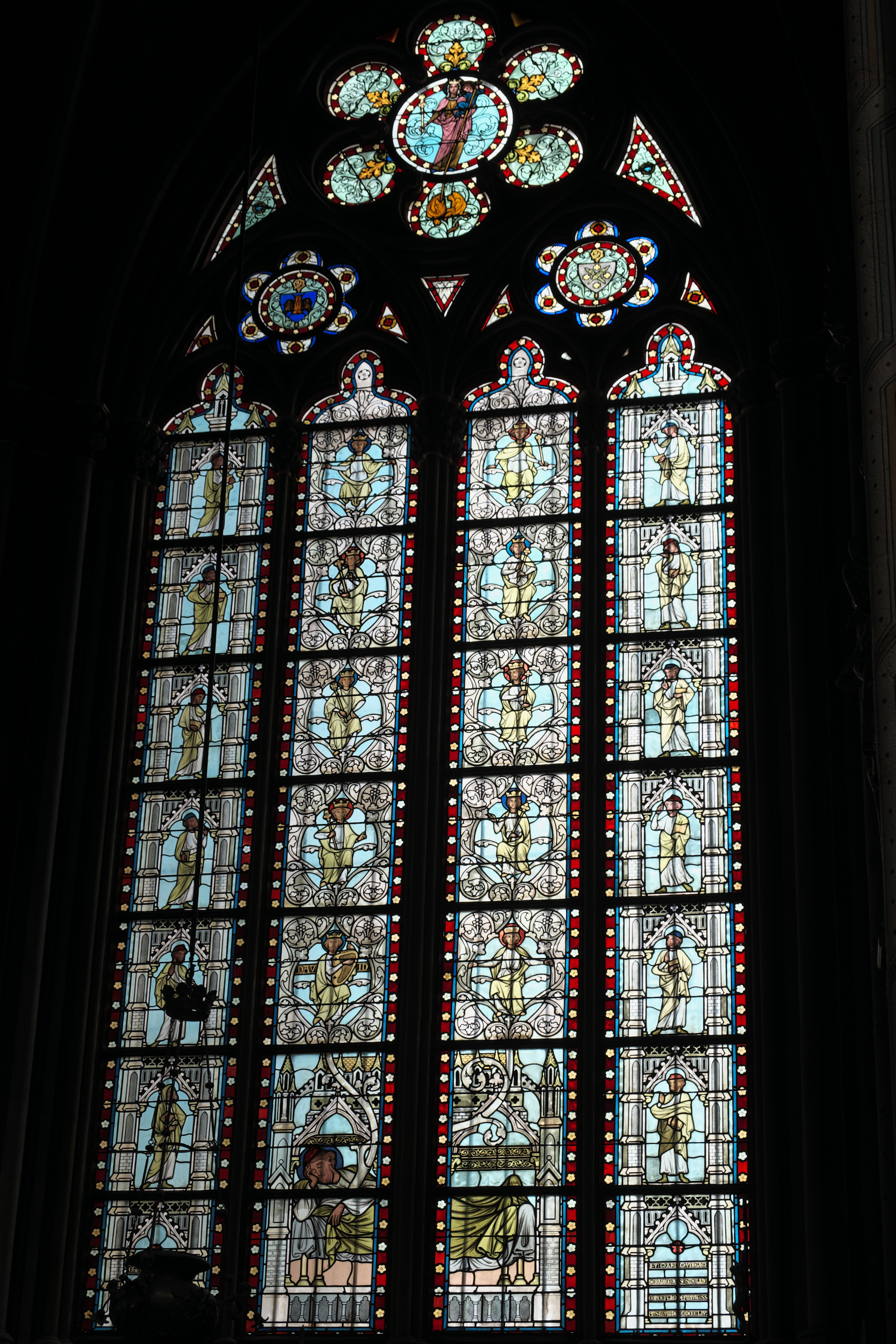
"Tree of Jesse" window showing ancestry of Christ

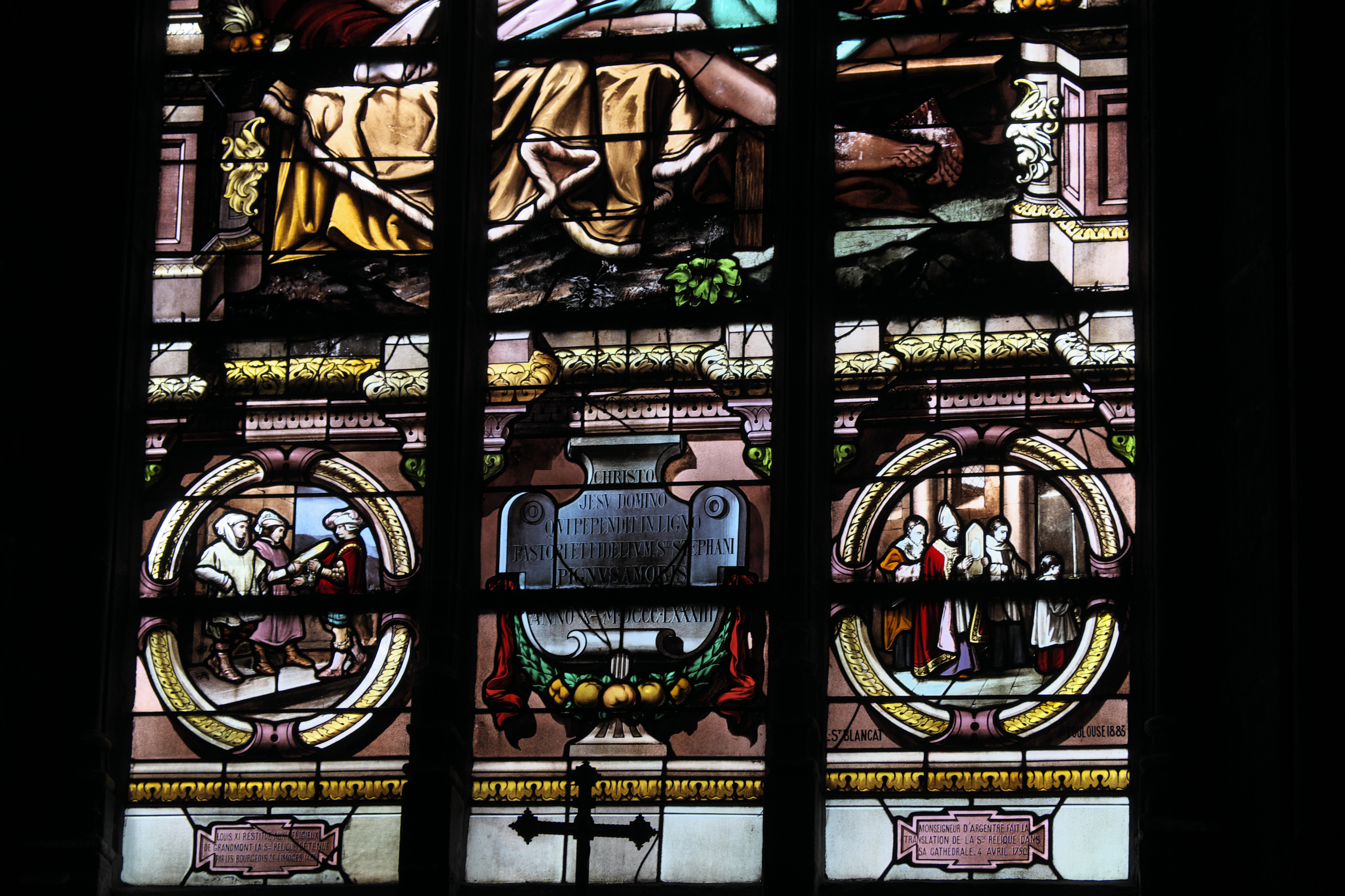
19-century tympanum window with some glass from 16th c. (bottom)

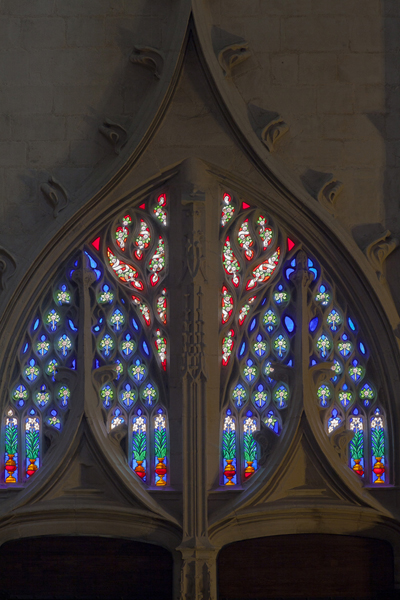
North transept window

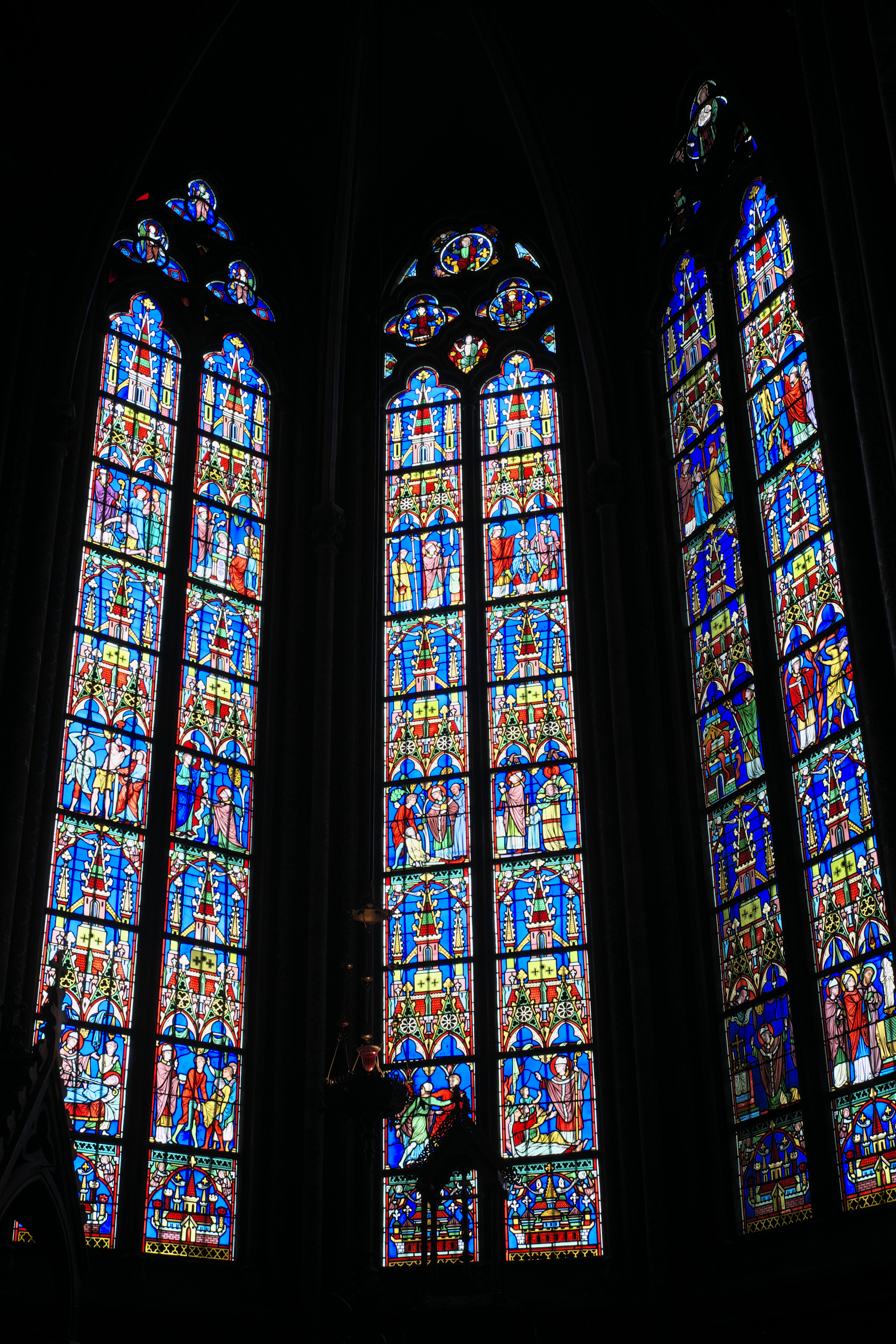
16th century scenes combined with 19th century glass

The stained glass windows in the bays of the choir and the upper transept, the rose windows in the transept, in the bays of the chapels of the nave and the narthex were created in the 19th century by the glass smiths Louis Charles Auguste Steinheil, Achille Oudinot and L. Saint-Blancat. They used many elements of glass from older windows dating mostly from the 14th century. Many of the windows were badly damaged by an explosion of a terrorist device attached to a gas cartridge in 2005. Restoration was still underway in 2024.

== Sources (in French) ==
René Fage, La cathédrale de Limoges, Paris, Henri Laurens, éditeur, 1913, 116 p. (lire en ligne)

René Fage, « Cathédrale de Limoges », Congrès archéologique de France, Paris, A. Picard « Congrès archéologique de France, 84e session, Limoges. 1921, Société française d'archéologie », 1923, p. 3-40 (lire en ligne)
