= Berthold (given name) =

Berthold is a Germanic, masculine given name and surname. It is derived from two elements, berht ('bright') and wald ('(to) rule'). Variants include Berchtold and Bertolt.

Notable people with the name include:

- Berthold Albrecht (1954–2012), German businessman
- Berthold II, Count of Andechs (before 1105 – 1151), German nobleman
- Berthold (patriarch of Aquileia) (c. 1182 – 1251), German-Hungarian archbishop
- Berthold Auerbach (1812–1882), German poet and author
- Berthold, Margrave of Baden (1906–1963), German aristocrat
- Berthold Bartosch (1893–1968), German Bohemian filmmaker and animator
- Berthold, Duke of Bavaria, (900–947), German duke
- Berthold Beitz (1913–2013), German industrialist
- Berthold Benecke (1843–1886), German anatomist and embryologist
- Berthold von Bernstorff (1842–1917), German politician, forester and landowner
- Berthold von Buchegg (died 1353), Bishop of Strasbourg
- Berthold of Calabria (died 1195), French crusader
- Berthold II, Duke of Carinthia, Duke of Carinthia from 1061 to 1077
- Berthold of Chiemsee (1465–1543), German bishop and theological writer
- Berthold C. Coburn (1899–1956), American politician
- Berthold Damcke (1812–1875), German conductor and composer
- Berthold von Deimling (1853–1944), German general
- Berthold Delbrück (1842–1922), German linguist
- Berthold Ebbecke (1906–1969), German actor and screenwriter
- Berthold Englisch (1851–1897), Austrian-Jewish chess master
- Berthold Epstein (1890–1962), Czech pediatrician
- Berthold Feiwel (1875–1937), Austrian-Jewish activist and poet
- Berthold Fernow (1837–1908), American historian and librarian
- Berthold Furtmeyr (fl. 1740–1501), German artist
- Berthold of Garsten (1060–1142), Austrian abbot
- Berthold Gersons (born 1945), Dutch psychiatrist and psychotraumatologist
- Berthold Goldschmidt (1903–1996), German Jewish composer
- Berthold Graßmuck (1917–1942), German World War II fighter pilot
- Berthold Grünfeld (1932–2007), Norwegian psychiatrist
- Berthold Guthmann (1893–1944), German lawyer and soldier
- Berthold of Hanover (fl. 12th century), German bishop
- Berthold Hatschek (1854–1941), Austrian zoologist
- Berthold Held (1868–1931), German actor and director
- Berthold VII, Count of Henneberg-Schleusingen (1272–1340), German nobleman
- Berthold von Henneberg (1442–1504), Roman Catholic archbishop
- Berthold Hochschild (1860–1928), German American mining magnate
- Berthold Hoeckner, German musicologist
- Berthold K.P. Horn (born 1943), American computer scientist
- Berthold Huber (born 1950), German trade union leader
- Berthold I of Istria (1110–1188), Margrave of Istria
- Berthold Jacob (1898–1944), German journalist and pacifist
- Berthold II von Katzenelnbogen, 13th-century German nobleman
- Berthold Keller (1927–2012), German trade union leader
- Berthold Kempinski (1843–1910), Prussian wine merchant
- Berthold Koch (1899–1988), German chess player
- Berthold Kohler (born 1961), German journalist
- Berthold Korts (1912–1943), German World War II fighter pilot
- Berthold Landauer (died 1430s), German painter
- Berthold II of Landsberg (died 1502), Bishop of Verden and Hildesheim
- Berthold Lasker (1860–1928), German physician, writer and chess master
- Berthold Laufer (1874–1934), German American Sinologist
- Berthold Leibinger (1930–2018), German businessman
- Berthold Litzmann (1857–1926), German literary historian
- Berthold Lubetkin (1901–1990), Georgian-British architect
- Berthold of Moosburg (died after 1361), Neoplatonic philosopher and theologian
- Berthold Müller-Oerlinghausen (1893–1979), German sculptor
- Berthold Nebel (1889–1964), American sculptor
- Berthold Neumoegen (1845–1895), American entomologist
- Berthold von Oberg (died 1494), German Roman Catholic prelate
- Berthold Oppenheim (1867–1942), Moravian rabbi
- Berthold Ostertag (1895–1975), German pathologist and physician
- Berthold Otto (1859–1933), German educator
- Berthold of Parma (died 1111), Italian Roman Catholic saint
- Berthold Possemeyer (born 1951), German baritone
- Berthold of Ratisbon (died 1272), German monk
- Berthold of Reichenau (died c. 1088), German Benedictine monk and chronicler
- Berthold Rembolt (died 1518), German-French printer
- Berthold Ribbentrop, Late 19th century forestry official in India
- Berthold Ruppel (died 1490s), German printer
- Berthold von Schenk (1895–1974), American Lutheran priest
- Berthold E. Schwarz (1924–2010), American psychiatrist and paranormal investigator
- Berthold of Schweinfurt (died 980), German nobleman
- Berthold Carl Seemann (1825–1871), German botanist
- Berthold Seitz (born 1962), German university teacher
- Berthold Sigismund (1819–1864), German physician and writer
- Berthold Slupik (1928–1992), German modern pentathlete
- Berthold Maria Schenk Graf von Stauffenberg (born 1934), German retired Bundeswehr general
- Berthold Schenk Graf von Stauffenberg (1905–1944), German aristocrat and lawyer
- Berthold Stein (1847–1899), Polish botanist
- Berthold Sterneck (1887–1943), Austrian operatic bass
- Berthold Suhle (1837–1904), German chess master
- Berthold I, Duke of Swabia, Eleventh-century German noble
- Berthold II, Duke of Swabia, Duke of Swabia from 1092 to 1098
- Berthold Teusner (1907–1992), Australian politician
- Berthold of Toul, bishop of Toul
- Berthold Tours (1838–1897), Dutch composer
- Berthold I, Count of Tyrol (died 1180), Count of Tyrol
- Berthold Ullman (1882–1965), American classical scholar
- Berthold of Urslingen (1217–1234), German nobleman
- Berthold Viertel (1885–1953), Austrian screenwriter and film director
- Berthold Warnecke (born 1971), German opera director
- Berthold Wehmeyer (1925–1949), German murderer
- Berthold Weisz (1845–1915), Hungarian industrialist and deputy
- Berthold Wiese (1859–1932), German Romance philologist
- Berthold Wolpe (1905–1989), German typographer and designer
- Berthold Woltze (1829–1896), German genre painter
- Berthold Wulf (1926–2012), German priest, poet and philosopher
- Berthold III, Duke of Zähringen (1085–1122), Duke of Zähringen
- Berthold IV, Duke of Zähringen (c. 1125–1186), Rector of Burgundy
- Berthold V, Duke of Zähringen (1160–1218), Duke of Zähringen
- Berthold of Zwiefalten, (c. 1089 – 1169), German abbot and historian

== See also ==
- Berthold (disambiguation)
- Berthold (surname)
