= Seitz (surname) =

Seitz is a surname. Those bearing it include:

== A ==
- Adalbert Seitz (1860–1938), German doctor and natural scientist
- Adolf Seitz (1898–1970), German–Argentine chess master
- Albert Seitz (1872–1937), French composer
- Alexander Seitz (c. 1473 – c. 1544), Swiss-German physician and lieutenant of Luther and Zwingli
- Alexander Maximilian Seitz (1811–1888), German painter
- Andy Seitz (born 1985), American pair skater

== B ==
- Beat Seitz (born 1973), Swiss bobsledder
- Bernarda Seitz (1927–2014), Argentine nun, writer, and presenter
- Berthold Seitz (born 1962) German ophthalmologist
- Bill Seitz (born 1954), member of the Ohio Senate

== C ==
- Chris Seitz (born 1987), American soccer player
- Collins J. Seitz (1914–1998), American judge
- Collins J. Seitz, Jr., American judge, son of the above
- Don Carlos Seitz (1862–1935), American newspaper manager

== E ==
- Ernest Seitz (1892–1978), Canadian composer

== F ==
- Florian Seitz (born 1982), German athlete
- Franz Seitz, Sr. (1887–1952), German film director
- Franz Seitz, Jr. (1920–2006), German film producer
- Frederick Seitz (1911–2008), American physicist
- Friedrich "Fritz" Seitz (1848–1918), German violinist, composer

== G ==
- Gary Seitz, (1943–2023), mathematician
- George Seitz (1894–1976), American murder victim
- George Seitz (politician) (1941–2015), member of the Victorian Legislative Assembly
- George A. Seitz (1897–1947), American navy officer
- George B. Seitz (1888–1944), American screenwriter, actor, and director

== H ==
- Hermann Seitz (1902–1942), German army officer
- Holger Seitz (born 1974), German football player and manager

== J ==
- Jane Seitz (1942–1988), German film editor
- Jochen Seitz (born 1976), German footballer
- John A. Seitz, brigadier general
- John F. Seitz (1892–1979), American cameraman
- John F. R. Seitz (1908-1978), American major general

== L ==
- Ludwig Seitz (1844–1908), also known as Ludovico Seitz, Italian painter

== K ==
- Kari Seitz (born 1970), American soccer referee
- Karl Seitz (1869–1950), Austrian politician
- Konrad Seitz (born 1934), German diplomat

== M ==
- Mark J. Seitz (born 1954), American Catholic bishop
- Michael Seitz (born 1959), American wrestler known as Michael Hayes

== N ==
- Nora Seitz (born 1984), German politician

== P ==
- Patricia A. Seitz (born 1946), American judge
- Patrick Seitz (born 1978), American voice actor
- Paul Seitz (1906–1984), French Catholic bishop
- Paul Seitz (trainer) (1897–1979), French footballer
- Peter Seitz (born 1931), German-born graphic designer
- Peter Seitz (1905–1983), American jurist who issued the Seitz decision

== R ==
- Raymond G. H. Seitz (born 1940), American diplomat
- Richard J. Seitz, lieutenant general
- Roland F. Seitz (1867–1946), American composer

== T ==
- Thomas Seitz (born 1967), German politician

== V ==
- Virginia A. Seitz (born 1956), American attorney

== W ==
- Wilhelm Seitz (1904–1987), German politician

== See also ==
- Zajc
- Zeitz (surname)
