= Berthold (surname) =

Berthold is a German surname. Notable people with the name include:

- Arnold Adolph Berthold (1803–1861), German physiologist and zoologist
- Avgust Berthold (1880–1919), Slovene photographer
- Barbara Metselaar Berthold (1951–2024), German photographer and filmmaker
- Daniel Berthold (born 1953), American philosopher
- David Berthold, Australian theatre director
- Fred Berthold (1922–2019), American theologian and academic
- Frederic Berthold (born 1991), Austrian World Cup alpine ski racer
- Gerhard Berthold (1891–1942), German general
- Helmut Berthold (1911–2000), German handball player
- Hermann Berthold (1831–1904), Prussian and German printer
- Hermine Berthold (1896–1990), German resistance member and politician
- Kate McKinnon Berthold (born 1984), American actress and comedian
- Lothar Berthold (1926–2007), German politician, historian and publisher
- Luc Berthold (born 1953), Canadian politician
- Mathias Berthold (born 1965), Austrian alpine skier
- Michael Berthold, German computer scientist
- Richard Berthold (born 1946), American historian of ancient Greece
- Rudolf Berthold (1891–1920), German WWI flying ace
- Rudolf Berthold (footballer) (1903–1976), German footballer
- Simón Berthold (died 1911), Mexican anarchist militant
- Thomas Berthold (born 1964), German footballer and soccer coach

== See also ==
- Berthold (disambiguation)
- Berthold (name)
- Berchtold
- Bertholds (disambiguation)
- Berthoud (surname)
