= Roses Bloom on the Moorland =

Roses Bloom on the Moorland may refer to:

- Roses Bloom on the Moorland (1929 film), a 1929 German silent historical drama film
- Roses Bloom on the Moorland (1952 film), a 1952 West German drama film
