= Project Alpha (hoax) =

Parapsychology hoax

Project Alpha was an effort by magician James Randi to test the quality of scientific rigor of a well-known test of paranormal phenomena.

In the late 1970s, Randi contacted the newly established McDonnell Laboratory for Psychical Research ("MacLab") with suggestions on how to conduct tests for paranormal phenomena. At the same time, two teenage boys (Steve Shaw, later known as Banachek, and Mike Edwards) independently contacted the McDonnell Laboratory and volunteered as subjects for such tests from 1979 to 1982. They quickly proved to exhibit a range of paranormal abilities far and away better than the other subjects of the experiment. The lab began leaking reports of the pair's capabilities, which were in fact simple magic tricks.

When rumors of the test subjects' connection to Randi reached Peter Phillips, head of the MacLab, he instituted tighter protocols for the experiments; the two subjects' results declined sharply. In 1983, Randi held a press conference to expose the deception in the wake of Project Alpha, as there were a number of controversies about the ethics of interference in scientific research and the validity of paranormal research as it then existed. It remains a watershed event in the field of parapsychology.

== McDonnell Laboratory for Psychical Research ==
In the 1970s, James Smith McDonnell, board chairman of McDonnell Douglas and believer in the paranormal, approached Washington University in St. Louis with plans to set up a permanent PSI research facility. Eventually, physicist Peter Phillips, who was also interested in the field, agreed to lead a parapsychology lab at the school. Phillips had degrees in physics from both Cambridge University and Stanford University. In 1979, McDonnell arranged a US$500,000 grant for the establishment and five years operation of the McDonnell Laboratory for Psychical Research, or MacLab for short. Phillips was most interested in spoon bending, also known as "psychokinetic metal bending", or PKMB.

== Experiment ==
In response to the announcement of this venture, James Randi wrote to the lab with a list of 11 pitfalls and his suggestions on how to avoid them. These suggestions included a rigid adherence to the protocol of the test, so that the subjects would not be allowed to change it during the run. In writing about Project Alpha, he cited Uri Geller, who had changed protocols during tests at Stanford Research Institute. Whenever something did not work, Geller simply did something else instead, which the researchers then reported as evidence of a successful experimental result. Other suggestions from Randi included using only one test object at a time, and permanently marking the object or objects used so they could not be switched with similar objects. He also suggested having as few people in the room as possible to avoid distractions. In addition, Randi offered his services to watch the experiments, noting that a conjurer would be an excellent person to look for fakery. According to Michael Thalbourne, Phillips did not take Randi up on the offer because of the magician's reputation of being "a showman rather than an unprejudiced critic" and his perceived hostility towards psychic claimants. However, on April 1, 1982, Randi awarded Phillips a Straight Spoon award for reconsidering his position on loose controls after what Randi called a "less-than-enthusiastic reception" for his presentation at the 1981 Parapsychological Association conference.

While testing applicants, the lab started to focus its energies on two young men, Steve Shaw and Mike Edwards, who were much more successful than other applicants. In fact, the two young men were magicians who had each independently contacted Randi when the opening of the laboratory was announced. They offered to participate as test subjects with Randi's support. Part of Randi's instructions to these men was to tell the truth if ever asked whether they were faking the results. According to Randi, they were never asked this question directly; according to a Washington University spokesman, Fred Volkmann, "Such a confrontation did occur and [Edwards and Shaw] did not own up." Shaw and Edwards recall that they were not asked whether they worked with Randi, but simply told there were rumors to that effect.

== Steven Shaw and Michael Edwards ==
When the establishment of the laboratory was announced, Mike Edwards, 18, and Steven Shaw, 17, now known as Banachek, both magicians, each contacted Randi independently with a plan. They proposed to use their skills to deceive the researchers with tricks during the first stages of the investigations. They were chosen as test subjects and the hoax began.

The project had originally started with spoon bending, so the two quickly developed a way to accomplish this. Contrary to one of the caveats Randi noted in his letter, the test setup included not one, but many and various spoons, labeled with paper on a loop of string instead of any sort of permanent marking. When starting to bend a spoon, the two magicians would complain the labels were in the way and remove them. They would then simply switch the labels when putting them back and wait. The spoons were measured before and after the experiment, and since all sorts of spoons were used, simply switching the labels would produce different measurements, causing the scientist to believe that something paranormal had occurred. In other cases, they would drop one of the spoons in their lap and bend it below the table with one hand, while pretending to bend a spoon in their other hand, distracting the scientists.

Because the studio was set up to allow people in front of the camera to see themselves on monitors, and the videotapes were available to be watched by anyone, the two used the video to critique their own performance. They would deliberately fail on their first attempt at a demonstration and then use the video to find out what was visible to the researchers and what was not. They would then modify their technique so it would not appear on video. Edwards found that one particular camera operator was on guard to capture any attempts at sleight of hand, so he picked the man to assist him in one experiment, and he was replaced by a less competent cameraman. This was also a breach of Randi's caveat of not letting subjects modify anything about the testing protocol; the test run should have been stopped at this point and recorded as a failure.

=== More experiments ===
Edwards and Shaw were so successful at spoon bending that several other tests were invented. In one, they were given pictures in sealed envelopes and then asked to try to identify them from a list shown to them later. The two were left alone in a room with the envelopes. Although there was a possibility that they would peek, this was supposed to be controlled by examining the envelopes later. The envelopes were held closed with four staples, which the magicians simply pried open with their fingernails. They looked at the picture and then resealed the envelope by inserting the staples back into the same holes and forcing them closed by pressing them against the table.

In another test, they were asked to influence the burnout point of a common fuse. After they were given a chance to work it with their mind, an increasing amount of current was run through the fuse until it blew. The two proved to have amazing abilities in this test after a few trials, eventually causing the fuses to blow immediately once they got used to it. In fact, they were palming the already blown fuses and then handing them back to the experimenters. They also found that pressing down on one end of the fuse in its holder, or just touching it briefly, caused the instruments to record unusual results that were interpreted by the experimenters as psi effects.

In yet another instance, Shaw and Edwards were asked to move small objects in a sealed transparent globe, normally small bits of paper balanced on an edge. At first, they were unable to get anything to happen, but then noticed that the container was being removed to replace the object within. During one such event, they took the opportunity to roll up a small ball of metal foil and drop it into the circular ring cut into the surface of the table that held the globe. This introduced a small gap under one edge, which they could blow into to make the paper move. Other examples included their ability to make digital clocks stop working properly (Edwards put one into a microwave oven for a few seconds), or make images appear on film just by staring at the camera (Shaw spat on the lens).

The researchers explained the inadequacies in experimental protocols by drawing a clear distinction between two different stages of an investigation: the exploratory, informal experiments and the formal experiments. During the exploratory phase, the researchers were simply trying to determine whether there was a phenomenon that could be worth further investigation. Later tests would have included the use of much more complicated protocols and expensive equipment. In this way, they were also trying to set up a comfortable, relaxed atmosphere that is believed to be conducive to psychic phenomena. It is during this stage that Shaw and Edwards were able to convince the researchers of their psychic abilities.

== Revelation and aftermath ==
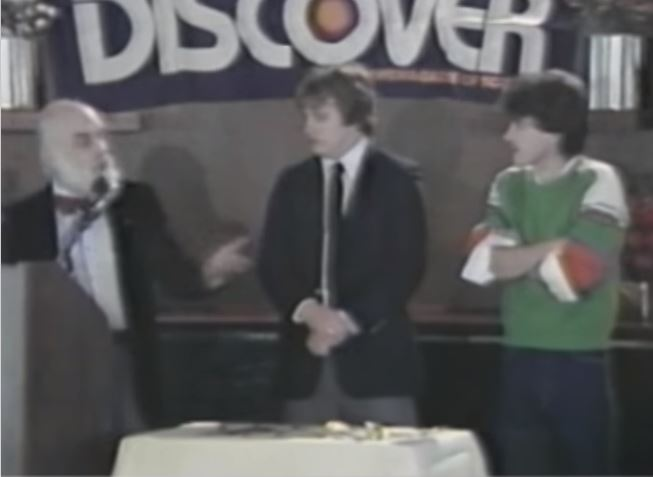
Project Alpha reveal "To be quite honest, we cheat" - Michael Edwards

2008 interview - James Randi and Michael Edwards pt. 1

2008 interview - James Randi and Michael Edwards pt. 2

Phillips decided to release a research brief at a workshop of the Parapsychological Association Convention in August 1981. According to the researchers' official version, in preparation Phillips also wrote to Randi to ask for a tape of fake metal-bending, which was to be shown alongside the recording of Shaw and Edwards. The researchers were looking for critical input from the parapsychology community and afterward released a revised abstract that reflected the received criticism.

After the Project Alpha announcements in the press, Randi wrote to the lab again and stated that it was entirely possible the two were magicians using common sleight of hand to fool the researchers. He also started to leak stories that the two were his plants. The story had been widely circulated by the time the meeting was held the next month. Upon returning from the meeting, Phillips immediately changed the test protocols; Shaw and Edwards found that they were no longer able to fool the experimenters so easily, and in most cases, unable to fool them at all. During this time the lab started releasing additional reports that seriously toned down the success rate. In their own words, "We did not conclude that they must be frauds, but only that after extensive testing, they were not behaving nearly as psychically as they had led us to expect."

According to Marcello Truzzi, Berthold E. Schwarz was the "chief victim of Project Alpha". Schwarz had written a monograph on Shaw's psychic powers which was withdrawn from publication. Truzzi adds "Dr. Schwarz first became involved with Shaw because Schwarz hoped that Shaw might be able to use PK to help his seriously ill daughter for whom no orthodox medical cure is available." Shaw states that he was unaware of this agenda of Dr. Schwarz.

== Ending ==
In 1983, Randi decided to end the project and announced the entire affair in a press conference and to Discover magazine. At the press conference, Randi introduced the two subjects as psychics, and asked how they achieved their results to which Michael Edwards replied, "To be quite honest, we cheat."

Martin Gardner referred to the hoax as a landmark. To counter accusations of unethical conduct on Randi's part, Gardner cites another similar case, that of the "discovery" of N-rays. Loyd Auerbach, noting the less than forty-eight hour notice given to the laboratory of Randi's press conference and the fact that Phillips was not invited to attend it, questioned whether Randi's motives were those of scientific research or showmanship.

An internal memo of the United States Central Intelligence Agency accused Randi of "gross distortions". The memo was written "in anticipation of ... discussions with representatives of Congress" regarding CIA research into paranormal abilities, which was contracted to SRI International, and said "This recent adverse publicity to the field of parapsychology should not have any adverse impact on the GRILL FLAME Project".

James S. McDonnell, who had provided the money to open the MacLab in 1979, died on August 22, 1980. In 1985, with no funding forthcoming, the MacLab closed its doors.

Randi viewed Project Alpha as "a great success" that "has resulted in some parapsychologists being more careful about their conclusions".

== Historiography ==
In a 2023 series of their podcast World's Greatest Con, Brian Brushwood and Justin Robert Young, incorporating their interviews with those involved in Project Alpha including Shaw and Edwards, made a case that Shaw and Edwards were the ones who led the effort and Randi's involvement has been greatly exaggerated in service of a simpler narrative easy for the masses to understand.

== See also ==
- Debunker
- Extrasensory perception
- List of scientific skeptics
