= Stars Over Colombo =

1953 film

- Directed by: Veit Harlan
- Written by: Peter Francke; Veit Harlan; Maria von der Osten-Sacken
- Produced by: Hans Albin; Kristina Söderbaum
- Starring: Kristina Söderbaum; Willy Birgel; Adrian Hoven
- Cinematography: Georg Bruckbauer; Klaus von Rautenfeld
- Edited by: Walter Boos
- Music by: Franz Grothe
- Production company: Divina-Film
- Distributed by: Gloria Film
- Release date: 17 November 1953
- Running time: 100 minutes
- Country: West Germany
- Language: German

Stars Over Colombo (German: Sterne über Colombo) is a 1953 West German adventure film directed by Veit Harlan and starring Kristina Söderbaum, Willy Birgel and Adrian Hoven. It was made in two parts, with a sequel The Prisoner of the Maharaja released in early 1954.

It was shot at the Bavaria Studios in Munich. Location shooting took place in Hamburg and Ceylon.

== Cast ==
- Kristina Söderbaum as Yrida
- Willy Birgel as Maharadscha von Jailapur Gowan
- Adrian Hoven as Gowaran
- René Deltgen as Lakamba
- Rolf von Nauckhoff as Pahana
- Hermann Schomberg as Götz sen.
- Paul Busch as Michael Götz
- Gilbert Houcke as Ambo
- Karl Hermann Martell as Dari
- Herbert Hübner as Zirkusdirektor
- Theodor Loos as Der heilige Mann
- Rolf Wanka as Prosecutor
- Otto Gebühr as Dr. Kuroma
- Sujata Jayawardena as Navarani
- Rudolf Vogel as Yogi
- Werner Lieven as Reishändler
- Veit Harlan as Clown
- Greta Schröder
- Oskar von Schab

== Bibliography ==
- Bock, Hans-Michael & Bergfelder, Tim. The Concise CineGraph. Encyclopedia of German Cinema. Berghahn Books, 2009.
