= Bertolt =

Bertolt is a German masculine given name and a surname. A variant of Berthold, it means "bright leader". Notable people with the name include:

== Given name ==
- Bertolt Brecht (1898–1956), German theatre practitioner, playwright and poet
- Bertolt Flick (born 1964), German businessman

== Surname ==
- Morten Bertolt (born 1984), Danish footballer

== See also ==
- Bertolt-Brecht-Literaturpreis, a German literary award
