= Zeitz (surname) =

Zeitz is a German surname. Notable people with the surname include:

- Christian Zeitz (born 1980), German handball player
- Jochen Zeitz (born 1963), German businessman
- Joshua M. Zeitz (born 1974), American historian, writer and politician
- Luise Zietz, German socialist and feminist
- Manuel Zeitz (born 1990), German footballer
- Paul Zeitz (born 1958), American mathematician

== See also ==
- Seitz (surname)
