= The Prisoner of the Maharaja =

1954 film

- Directed by: Veit Harlan
- Written by: Peter Francke; Veit Harlan; Maria von der Osten-Sacken
- Produced by: Hans Albin
- Starring: Kristina Söderbaum; Willy Birgel; Adrian Hoven
- Cinematography: Georg Bruckbauer
- Edited by: Walter Boos
- Music by: Franz Grothe
- Production company: Divina-Film
- Distributed by: Gloria Film
- Release date: 5 February 1954
- Running time: 103 minutes
- Country: West Germany
- Language: German

The Prisoner of the Maharaja (German: Die Gefangene des Maharadscha) is a 1954 West German adventure film directed by Veit Harlan and starring Kristina Söderbaum, Willy Birgel, and Adrian Hoven. It is a sequel to the 1953 film Stars Over Colombo.

== Cast ==
- Kristina Söderbaum as Yrida
- Willy Birgel as Maharadscha von Jailapur Gowan
- Adrian Hoven as Gowaran
- René Deltgen as Lakamba
- Rolf von Nauckhoff as Pahana
- Hermann Schomberg as Götz sen.
- Paul Busch as Götz jun.
- Gilbert Houcke as Ambo
- Karl Martell as Dari
- Herbert Hübner as Zirkusdirektor
- Sujata Jayawardena as Navarani
- Theodor Loos as Der heilige Mann
- Rolf Wanka as Prosecutor
- Otto Gebühr as Dr. Kuroma
- Oskar von Schab
- Greta Schröder as Yrida`s Krankenschwester
- Rudolf Vogel as Yogi
- Werner Lieven
- Hans Magel
- Alexander von Malachowsky

== Bibliography ==
- Bock, Hans-Michael; Bergfelder, Tim, eds. (2009). The Concise Cinegraph: Encyclopaedia of German Cinema. New York: Berghahn Books. ISBN 978-1-57181-655-9.
