= Hans Albin =

- Born: 27 July 1905; Berlin, German Empire
- Died: 5 September 1988 (aged 83); Munich, Bavaria, West Germany
- Occupations: Actor, Producer, Director
- Years active: 1932–1970 (film)

Hans Albin (27 July 1905 – 5 September 1988) was a German actor, film producer and film director.

== Selected filmography ==
- Homecoming to Happiness (1933)
- Three Bluejackets and a Blonde (1933)
- The Champion of Pontresina (1934)
- Heinz in the Moon (1934)
- Gypsy Blood (1934)
- Miss Madame (1934)
- Love Conquers All (1934)
- The Four Musketeers (1934)
- A Night of Change (1935)
- The Model Husband (1937)
- Carnival in White (1952)
- Stars Over Colombo (1953)
- Spring Song (1954)
- The Prisoner of the Maharaja (1954)
- I'll See You at Lake Constance (1956)
- No Survivors, Please (1964)
- Games of Desire (1964)
- Radhapura – Endstation der Verdammten (1968)
- Hugo, the Woman Chaser (1969)

== Bibliography ==
- Goble, Alan. The Complete Index to Literary Sources in Film. Walter de Gruyter, 1999.
