= Berthold =

Berthold may refer to:

- Berthold (given name), a Germanic given name
- Berthold (surname), a Germanic surname
- Berthold Type Foundry, former German type foundry
- Berthold, North Dakota, a place in the United States

== See also ==
- Berthod, a surname
- Berchtold, a name
