= Roses Bloom on the Moorland (1952 film) =

1952 film directed by Hans H. König

- Directed by: Hans H. König
- Written by: Hans H. König
- Produced by: Richard König
- Starring: Ruth Niehaus; Hermann Schomberg; Armin Dahlen
- Cinematography: Peter Haller; Bertl Höcht; Heinz Schnackertz
- Edited by: Elisabeth Kleinert-Neumann
- Music by: Werner Bochmann
- Production company: König Film
- Distributed by: Panorama-Film
- Release date: 25 December 1952
- Running time: 90 minutes
- Country: West Germany
- Language: German

Roses Bloom on the Moorland (German: Rosen blühen auf dem Heidegrab) is a 1952 West German drama film directed by Hans H. König and starring Ruth Niehaus, Hermann Schomberg and Armin Dahlen. It is also known in English by the alternative titles Rape on the Moor and Roses Bloom on the Grave in the Heather.

The film's sets were designed by Max Mellin. The film was shot on moorlands in the vicinity of Bremen. It is notable amongst post-war heimatfilm for its gloomy, gothic atmosphere.

== Synopsis ==
In a German village a peasant girl is pressured by her family to marry a wealthy farmer, although she is in love with her childhood sweetheart who has recently returned from the city. Her fiancée tries to rape her on the moorland, echoing a similar tragedy that took place on the same spot hundreds of years ago during the Thirty Years War when a Swedish soldier attacked a local woman.

== Cast ==
- Ruth Niehaus as Dorothee Aden
- Hermann Schomberg as Dietrich Eschmann
- Armin Dahlen as Ludwig Amelung, Architekt
- Gisela von Collande as Fiete, Eschmanns Magd
- Lotte Brackebusch as Sophie Amelung
- Hilde Körber as Friederike Aden
- Hedwig Wangel as Kräuterjule
- Ingeborg Morawski as Gesine, Magd bei Adens
- Albert Florath as Stallmacher, Wirt
- Ernst Waldow as Albert Berndsen, Handelsvertreter
- Walter Ladengast as Fromann, ein alter Schäfer
- Otto Friebel as Heini Schütt, Verkäufer
- Konrad Mayerhoff as Wilhelm Aden
- Anderl Kern
- Josef Dahmen as Der schwedische Leutnant
- Fred Berthold

== Bibliography ==
- Maggie Hoffgen. Studying German Cinema. Columbia University Press, 2009.
- Alexandra Ludewig. Screening Nostalgia: 100 Years of German Heimat Film. Transcript, 2014.
