= Hermann Schomberg =

German actor

- Born: 22 August 1907; Unna, Province of Westphalia, Prussia, German Empire
- Died: 16 November 1975 (aged 68); Hamburg, West Germany
- Occupation: Actor
- Years active: 1935–1974

Hermann Schomberg (22 August 1907 – 16 November 1975) was a German film and television actor.

== Filmography ==
Year	Title	Role	Notes
1935	Frisians in Peril	Klaus Niegebüll	
1936	The Violet of Potsdamer Platz	Schupo Lemke	
1937	Nachtwache im Paradies		
1947	In Those Days	Dr. Ansbach / 4. Geschichte	
1949	The Last Night	General Riedel, Divisionsgeneral	
1950	Shadows in the Night	Edgar Elsberg	
1951	The Prisoner of the Maharaja	Pfarrer Georg Bonnix	
1951	Hanna Amon	Alois Brunner	
1952	Turtledove General Delivery	Professor Richard Gomoll	
1952	Towers of Silence	Richard Poolmans	
1952	Roses Bloom on the Moorland	Dietrich Eschmann	
1953	Stars Over Colombo	Götz sen.	
1954	The Prisoner of the Maharaja	Götz sen.	
1960	Faust	Theaterdirektor / Der HERR / Erdgeist	

== Bibliography ==
- Giesen, Rolf. Nazi Propaganda Films: A History and Filmography. McFarland, 2003.
