= Berthod =

Berthod is a surname of French-language origin. People with that name include:

- Didier Berthod, Swiss rock climber
- François Berthod, French music arranger of airs de cour, 1656, 1658 and 1662
- Jérémy Berthod (born 1984), French footballer
- Madeleine Berthod (born 1931), Swiss former alpine skier
- Marc Berthod (born 1983), Swiss alpine skier
- Sylviane Berthod (born 1977), female alpine skier from Switzerland

== See also ==
- Berthold (disambiguation)
