= Bertholds =

Bertholds may refer to:

People

- Berthold-Bezelin, 10th-century German princes who ruled the territories of Trechirgau and Maifeldgau also known as the Bertholds

Surnames

Bertholds is a Latvian-language surname, a Latvian-spelling version of Berthold. The feminine form is Bertholde.

- Viktors Bertholds, one of the last native speakers of the Livonian language
- Grizelda Bertholde, maiden name of Grizelda Kristiņa, last native speaker of the Livonian language
