= Daniel Berthold =

American philosopher (born 1953)

- Born: 1953 (age 72–73)

Academic background
- Education: Yale University (PhD)
- Thesis: Being, Becoming and Knowing in Hegel's Philosophy (1983)

Academic work
- Era: Contemporary philosophy
- Region: Western philosophy
- School or tradition: German Idealism
- Institutions: Bard College

Daniel Berthold-Bond (born 1953) is a professor emeritus of philosophy at Bard College.

== Life and works ==
=== Selected publications ===
- The Ethics of Authorship: Communication, Seduction, and Death in Hegel and Kierkegaard. Fordham University Press. 2011. ISBN 978-0-8232-3394-6.
- Hegel's Theory of Madness. SUNY Press. 1995. ISBN 978-0-7914-2505-3.
- Berthold-Bond, Daniel (1989). Hegel's Grand Synthesis: A Study of Being, Thought, and History. SUNY Press. ISBN 978-0-88706-955-0.

==== Articles ====
- "Freud's Critique of Philosophy". Metaphilosophy. 20 (3/4): 274–294. 1989. ISSN 0026-1068.
- "Hegel, Nietzsche, and Freud on Madness and the Unconscious". The Journal of Speculative Philosophy. 5 (3): 193–213. 1991. ISSN 0891-625X.
