= Berthold Wiese =

German Romance philologist

Berthold Heinrich Friedrich Wiese (19 December 1859, in Rostock – 3 May 1932, in Halle an der Saale) was a German Romance philologist, who specialized in Italian language and literature.

He studied languages at the University of Berlin, where he was awarded his doctorate in 1883 (doctoral advisor, Adolf Tobler) after a study trip to Italy (1881/82). In 1884/85 he was a gymnasium teacher in Ludwigslust, then taught for many years in Halle an der Saale (1886–1925). In the meantime, he gave lectures at the University of Halle (1889–1925), where in 1914 he received an honorary professorship. In 1903 he became an honorary member of the American Dante Society of Cambridge, Massachusetts.

== Selected works ==
- Ueber die Sprache des Tesoretto Brunetto Latinos, 1883 ("On the language of Brunetto Latini")
- Poesie edite ed inedite di Lionardo Giustinani, 1883 (edition of the poems of Leonardo Giustiniani)
- Neunzehn Lieder Leonardo Giustinianis nach den alten Drucken, 1885 ("Nineteen songs by Leonardo Giustiniani according to old prints")
- Eine altlombardische Margarethen-Legende, 1890 ("An Old Lombard legend of St Margaret")
- Geschichte der italienischen litteratur von den ältesten Zeiten bis zur Gegenwart, 1898 ("History of Italian literature from its origins to the present day")
- Kommentar zu Dantes Göttlicher Komödie, 1902 ("Commentary on Dante's Divine Comedy")
- Altitalienisches Elementarbuch, 1904 ("Early Italian primer")
- Das Ninfale fiesolano Giovanni Boccaccios, 1913 (edition of the Ninfale fiesolano by Giovanni Boccaccio)
- Italienischer Sprachführer, Taschenwörterbuch für Reise u. Haus, 1915 ("Italian phrasebook; pocket dictionary for travel and home")
