= Zajc =

Zajc is a surname. Notable people with the surname include:

- Dane Zajc (1929–2005), Slovene poet
- Gorazd Zajc (born 1987), Slovenian footballer
- Ivan Zajc (1832–1914), Croatian composer, conductor, director and teacher
- Miha Zajc (born 1994), Slovenian footballer
- Timi Zajc (born 2000), Slovenian ski jumper
- Tina Zajc (born 1983), Slovenian beauty queen
- William Allen Zajc, American physicist
