= Berthold Kohler =

German journalist (born 1961)

Berthold Kohler (born 29 December 1961 in Marktredwitz) is a German journalist and one of the four publishers of the leading conservative German newspaper Frankfurter Allgemeine Zeitung.

After the study of political science at the University of Bamberg and the London School of Economics, in 1989 he started working at the political editorship of the Frankfurter Allgemeine Zeitung. At the beginning of the nineties he was sent as correspondent to Prague, later to Vienna, where he was a correspondent for east and southern European affairs. In 1999, he was appointed as a publisher of Frankfurter Allgemeine Zeitung.
