= Berthold Weisz =

Hungarian industrialist and deputy

Berthold Weisz a Hungarian deputy; born at Budapest in 1845. He was educated at the gymnasium and commercial academy of his native city, devoting himself especially to the study of political economy. In 1876 he became a member of the arbitration committee of the Budapest exchange, and contributed much toward promoting Hungarian commerce and industry. He was one of the founders (1879) of the suburban railroad system of Budapest, and in the following year took part in the framing of the industrial code. Since 1883 he established the Hungarian preserve-factory and factories for brassware and cartridges in Budapest and Berlin, as well as textile manufactories in Waitzen, Banská Štiavnica, Kőszeg, and Ružomberok. He was the originator also of the Danubius Dockyards in Budapest. The national pension bureau for employees in mercantile houses and the central hypothecary department of the provincial savings-banks owed their existence chiefly to his efforts.

Since 1896 Weisz represented the district of Nagyajta in the Hungarian Parliament, and in 1903 he received the title of court councilor.
