= Berthold Ruppel =

German printer (died 1490s)

Berthold Ruppel (died in 1494 or 1495) was the first printer in Basel, Switzerland, active from at least 1468 on.

He came originally from Hanau, in Hesse (Germany), and worked with the printer Johannes Gutenberg in Mainz in 1455 (where he was called Bechtolff von Hanau). There are 21, mainly religious, works from his printing press known. The oldest is a Bible in Latin, from 1468. At least 5 works were created in collaboration with Michael Wenssler and Bernhard Richel. He does not appear to have owned a house on his own, but lived in a rented place. Before the year 1475, he married Magdalena Meigerin. In 1477 he became a citizen of Basel.
