= Berthold Ostertag =

German pathologist and physician (1895–1975)

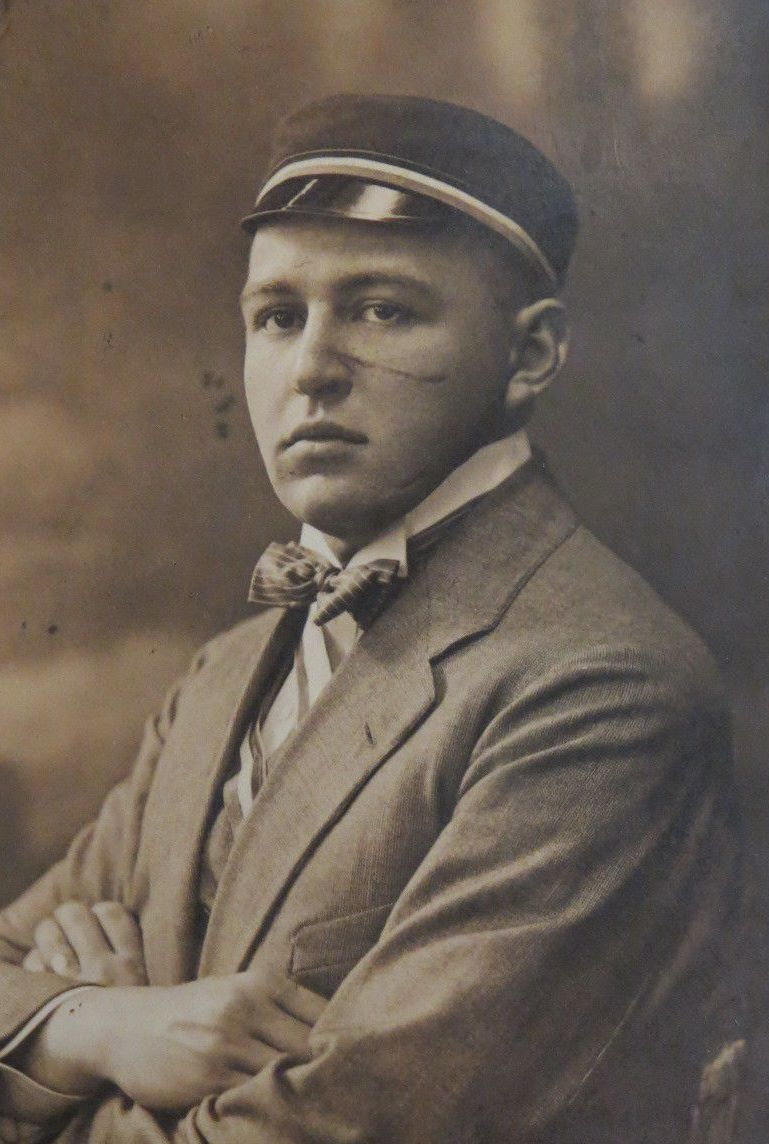
Berthold Ostertag (1919)

Berthold Ostertag (born February 28, 1895, in Berlin; died November 14, 1975, in Tübingen) was a German pathologist.

== Life ==
Berthold Ostertag was the son of veterinarian Robert von Ostertag and his wife Margarete, née Hertwig. He completed his schooling in 1913 with the Abitur and then completed his six-month military service. He then began studying medicine at the University of Tübingen. During his studies, he became a member of the Corps Rhenania Tübingen in 1914 and later in 1919 a member of the Corps Marchia Berlin. Due to the outbreak of World War I, he had to interrupt his studies as he was conscripted as a medical non-commissioned officer in the German Army. He was able to resume his studies in Tübingen in 1915 for the Physikum.

After the war, Ostertag organized a student company in Tübingen and participated in combat against revolutionary Spartacists with a Freikorps. After resuming his studies again, Ostertag completed his medical degree in 1920 and received his Dr. med. in Tübingen. He then worked as a volunteer doctor at the Pathological Institute of the University of Tübingen and from 1921 at the Berlin Pathological Institute. Other stations included a guest assistantship under Walther Spielmeyer at the German Research Institute for Psychiatry in Munich, heading the laboratory of the University Neurology Clinic of the Charité under Karl Bonhoeffer, and eventually returning to the Pathological Institute of the University of Tübingen. From 1925, he was prosector of the Heil- und Pflegeanstalt Berlin-Buch. He married Ilse Kobel in 1924, with whom he had two daughters and a son.

Following the Machtergreifung in 1933, he joined the SA, where he achieved the rank of Sanitätssturmführer. In early August 1933, he "in SA uniform drove out his Jewish fraternity brother Rudolf Jaffé as head of the Pathological Institute at Moabit Hospital". In May 1934, he moved in the same capacity to the Pathological Institute of the Rudolf Virchow Hospital, where he remained until the end of the war in the spring of 1945. On August 1, 1935, he became a member of the NSDAP (membership number 3,669,462). Ostertag had a significant conflict with the brain researcher Oskar Vogt, which led to the withdrawal of his SA membership in 1937.

In 1935, he habilitated at the medical faculty of the University of Berlin in the field of pathology. He then taught at the University of Berlin initially as a private lecturer and from May 1940 as an associate professor.

During World War II, he was called up as a medical officer to the Wehrmacht at the end of 1940 but was able to continue living and working in Berlin. He was also responsible for brain injury hospitals of the Army. After the war-related destruction of his institute in September 1943, parts of the institute were relocated to Hohenlychen. Subsequently, he was stationed in Teupitz, Bad Nauheim, and in early 1945 in Tübingen.

Ostertag cooperated with the Reich Committee for the Scientific Registering of Hereditary and Congenital Illnesses as part of the child euthanasia program. He also focused on researching "intrauterine damage to children through autopsies at the Hefter Clinic". Together with his senior physician Hans Klein, he autopsied children who were murdered in the Special Children's Ward of the Municipal Nervous Clinic for Children and Adolescents Wiesengrund in Berlin-Wittenau. On May 8, 1944, he wrote to the German Research Foundation among other things: "We are receiving research material from the Reich Committee for the registration of congenital malformations, etc.".

After the war, he was denazified. From 1950, he headed the Neuropathological Laboratory at the University Neurology Clinic in Tübingen and established the Institute for Brain Research there. In 1960, he was appointed associate professor of neuropathology and in 1964 retired. Ostertag was awarded the Grand Federal Cross of Merit in 1964. As a neuro- and tumor pathologist, Ostertag's research focus was on constitutional pathology.

What comes in my obituary is indifferent to me – I won't read it anymore. It is more important to me that the fraternity [Rhenania] continues to exist decently.

— Ostertag in a letter dated February 6, 1972

== Selected works ==
- Einteilung und Charakteristik der Hirngewächse: Ihre natürliche Klassifizierung zum Verständnis von Sitz, Ausbreitung u. Gewebsaufbau. Fischer, Jena 1936.
- Pathologie der raumfordernden Prozesse des Schädelbinnenraums. Enke, Stuttgart 1941.
- Die Sektionstechnik des Gehirns und des Rückenmarks nebst Anleitung zur Befunderhebung. Springer, Berlin 1944.
- Anatomie und Pathologie der raumfordernden Prozesse des Schädelinnenraumes. In: Chirurgie der Gehirnkrankheiten (= New German Surgery. Volume 50). Volume III. Enke, Stuttgart 1949.
