= Berthold Graßmuck =

German World War II fighter pilot (1917–1942)

- Born: 13 January 1917; Rodach, German Empire
- Died: 28 October 1942 (aged 25); Pitomnik Airfield, Stalingrad, Soviet Union
- Military career
- Allegiance: Nazi Germany
- Branch: Luftwaffe
- Rank: Oberfeldwebel (staff sergeant)
- Unit: JG 52
- Conflicts: World War II: European air campaign; Eastern Front; Battle of Stalingrad
- Awards: Knight's Cross of the Iron Cross

Berthold Graßmuck (Note: His name, in German, is spelled with a "sharp S"; see ß.) (13 January 1917 – 28 October 1942) was a German Luftwaffe military aviator during World War II. As a fighter ace, he was credited with 65 aerial victories, one over the Royal Air Force and 64 over the Eastern Front, claimed in 236 combat missions.

Born in Rodach, Graßmuck was trained as a fighter pilot and posted to Jagdgeschwader 52 (JG 52—52nd Fighter Wing) in 1940. He claimed his first aerial victory on 9 May 1941 on the Western Front. His unit was transferred to the Eastern Front in late September 1941. There, Graßmuck claimed his first aerial victory in this theater on 5 October during the Battle of Vyazma. On 19 September 1942, he was awarded the Knight's Cross of the Iron Cross for 56 aerial victories. One month later on 28 October, Graßmuck was killed in an aircraft crash near the Pitomnik Airfield during the Battle of Stalingrad.

== Career ==
Graßmuck was born on 13 January 1917 in Rodach, Saxe-Coburg and Gotha within the German Empire. Following flight and fighter pilot training, (Note: Flight training in the Luftwaffe progressed through the levels A1, A2 and B1, B2, referred to as A/B flight training. A training included theoretical and practical training in aerobatics, navigation, long-distance flights and dead-stick landings. The B courses included high-altitude flights, instrument flights, night landings and training to handle the aircraft in difficult situations.) he was transferred to 1. Staffel (1st squadron) of Jagdgeschwader 52 (JG 51—51st Fighter Wing) in 1940. On 27 April 1941, the Gruppenstab (headquarters unit) and 1. Staffel moved to Westerland Airfield on Sylt. The other two Staffeln of I. Gruppe (1st group) were based at Eelde Airfield in the Netherlands and Esbjerg Airfield in Denmark. Here, Graßmuck claimed his first aerial victory on 9 May when he shot down a Royal Air Force (RAF) Vickers Wellington bomber west of Heligoland.

Until 21 February 1941, the entire I. Gruppe was based at an airfield at Katwijk in the Netherlands where it was tasked with patrolling the Dutch coast area and German Bight, the three Staffeln were then deployed at various airfields on the Dutch, German and Danish North Sea coast. On 25 May, I. Gruppe was placed under the command of Hauptmann Karl-Heinz Leesmann. On 23 September, I. Gruppe was withdrawn from the Western Front and was sent to the Eastern Front. With stopovers at Dortmund, Magdeburg, and Warsaw, the Gruppe arrived in Orsha on 29 September.

=== War against the Soviet Union ===
On 22 June 1941, German forces had launched Operation Barbarossa, the invasion of the Soviet Union. Prior to its deployment on the Eastern Front, I. Gruppe was fully equipped with the Messerschmitt Bf 109 F-2. Following relocation to Orsha, the Gruppe moved to Ponyatovka, located approximately 30 kilometers (19 miles) southwest of Roslavl, on 2 October. There, the Gruppe was initially subordinated to the Stab of Jagdgeschwader 27 (JG 27—27th Fighter Wing) and supported German forces fighting in the Battle of Vyazma as part of Operation Typhoon, the code name of the German offensive on Moscow. Here, Graßmuck claimed his first aerial victory on the Eastern Front, and his second in total, when he shot down a Polikarpov I-16 fighter on 5 October.

I./JG 52 insignia

On 1 February 1942. I Gruppe was withdrawn from combat operations and was moved to Smolensk and then further west to Orsha. That day, Graßmuck's Bf 109 F-2 suffered engine failure during the relocation flight, resulting in an emergency landing at Minsk. From 8 to 12 February the Gruppe took a train to Jesau near Königsberg, present-day Kaliningrad in Russia, for a period of recuperation and replenishment where they received new Bf 109 F-4 aircraft. The Gruppe was ordered to Olmütz, present-day Olomouc in Czech Republic, on 11 April. On 17 May, I. Gruppe relocated to Artyomovsk, present-day Bakhmut.

On 26 June, the Gruppe moved to an airfield at Bilyi Kolodyaz, approximately 10 kilometers (6.2 miles) southeast of Vovchansk. Two days later, German forces had launched Case Blue, the strategic summer offensive in southern Russia with the objective to capture the oil fields of Baku, Grozny and Maykop. Here on 29 June, Graßmuck claimed his 40th aerial victory when he shot down three Lend-Lease Hawker Hurricane fighters. On 3 July, the Gruppe moved to a forward airfield near the village Novy Grinev located approximately 30 kilometers (19 miles) south-southwest from Novy Oskol and to Artyomovsk on 9 July. During this period, Graßmuck was awarded the Honor Goblet of the Luftwaffe (Ehrenpokal der Luftwaffe) on 6 July.

On 2 August 1942, I. Gruppe was ordered to Kerch on the Kerch Peninsula. At the time, the Gruppe was moved around as a kind of fire brigade, deployed in areas where the Soviet Air Forces was particularly active. Here on 6 August, Graßmuck claimed his 50th aerial victory, an Ilyushin Il-2 ground-attack aircraft, and a Lavochkin-Gorbunov-Gudkov LaGG-3 fighter shot down five days later. For this, he was awarded the German Cross in Gold (Deutsches Kreuz in Gold) on 13 August. The Gruppe then moved to Oryol on 15 August. Following his 56th aerial victory, Graßmuck was nominated for the Knight's Cross of the Iron Cross (Ritterkreuz des Eisernen Kreuzes) which was awarded on 19 September.

On 22 September during the Battle of Stalingrad, I. Gruppe moved to Pitomnik Airfield where they were subordinated to Jagdgeschwader 3 "Udet" (JG 3—3rd Fighter Wing). Here, Graßmuck claimed an Il-2 ground-attack aircraft, his 65th and last aerial victory. Two days later, Graßmuck conducted a maintenance flight and was killed in a crash 6 kilometers (3.7 miles) east of Pitomnik Airfield. Investigation revealed that the engine of his Bf 109 G-2 (Werknummer 13522—factory number) had failed. (Note: According to Weal, Graßmuck was shot down by Soviet anti-aircraft artillery.) At the time of his death, Graßmuck was the leading fighter pilot of I. Gruppe. He was buried on the German war cemetery near the Pitomnik Airfield.

== Summary of career ==
=== Aerial victory claims ===
According to US historian David T. Zabecki, Graßmuck was credited with 65 aerial victories. Both Obermaier and Spick also list him with 65 aerial victories claimed in 236 combat missions. Mathews and Foreman, authors of Luftwaffe Aces – Biographies and Victory Claims, researched the German Federal Archives and found records for 64 aerial victory claims. With the exception of one aerial victory claimed over the RAF, all other aerial victories were claimed on the Eastern Front.

Victory claims were logged to a map-reference (PQ = Planquadrat), for example "PQ 0519". The Luftwaffe grid map (Jägermeldenetz) covered all of Europe, western Russia and North Africa and was composed of rectangles measuring 15 minutes of latitude by 30 minutes of longitude, an area of about 360 square miles (930 km^{2}). These sectors were then subdivided into 36 smaller units to give a location area 3 km × 4 km (1.9 mi × 2.5 mi) in size.

Chronicle of aerial victories
This and the ? (question mark) indicates information discrepancies listed by Prien, Stemmer, Rodeike, Balke, Bock, Mathews and Foreman.
Claim	Date	Time	Type	Location	Claim	Date	Time	Type	Location
– 1. Staffel of Jagdgeschwader 52 – On the Western Front — 27 December 1940 – 23 September 1941
1	9 May 1941	05:35	Wellington	20 km (12 mi) west of Heligoland					
– 1. Staffel of Jagdgeschwader 52 – Operation Barbarossa — 2 October – 5 December 1941
2	5 October 1941	14:53	I-16		5	28 November 1941	12:48	Il-2	
3	12 October 1941	10:35	Il-2		6	30 November 1941	12:36	Pe-2	
4	4 November 1941	15:30	I-153		7	2 December 1941	14:03	MiG-3	
– 1. Staffel of Jagdgeschwader 52 – On the Eastern Front — 6 December 1941 – 5 February 1942
8	9 January 1942	09:05	I-61 (MiG-3)		9	22 January 1942	12:54	I-61 (MiG-3)	
– 1. Staffel of Jagdgeschwader 52 – On the Eastern Front — 6 February 1941 – 28 October 1942
10	21 May 1942	13:30	I-61 (MiG-3)		38	29 June 1942	16:40	Hurricane	
11	21 May 1942	13:38	I-61 (MiG-3)		39	29 June 1942	19:20	Hurricane	
12	25 May 1942	05:35	I-61 (MiG-3)		40	29 June 1942	19:25	Hurricane	
13	25 May 1942	05:40	Il-2		41	3 July 1942	06:40	LaGG-3	
14	25 May 1942	07:25	Il-2		42	3 July 1942	16:35	LaGG-3	
15	26 May 1942	07:25	I-61 (MiG-3)		43	3 July 1942	16:39	LaGG-3	
16	26 May 1942	17:30	I-16		44	4 July 1942	18:50	P-40	
17	28 May 1942	07:55	Il-2	4 km (2.5 mi) east of Izyum	45	5 July 1942	10:15	Boston	
18	2 June 1942	04:20	MiG-1		46	6 July 1942	14:45	R-5	
19	2 June 1942	04:22	MiG-1		47	10 July 1942	10:15	Pe-2	
20	2 June 1942	04:25	MiG-1		48	10 July 1942	10:17	LaGG-3	
21	3 June 1942	05:00	R-10 (Seversky)		49	10 July 1942	14:26	I-153	
22	3 June 1942	14:23	LaGG-3		50	6 August 1942	09:15	Il-2	PQ 0519
23	4 June 1942	18:44	Il-2		51	11 August 1942	10:20	LaGG-3	PQ 75427 northeast of Novorossiysk
24	4 June 1942	18:45	MiG-1		52	18 August 1942	16:55	I-180 (Yak-7)	PQ 55884; Black Sea
25	4 June 1942	18:47	MiG-1		53	21 August 1942	11:00	LaGG-3	PQ 64184
26	6 June 1942	11:25	Il-2		54	21 August 1942	11:05	LaGG-3	PQ 64183
27	11 June 1942	09:40	MiG-1		55	21 August 1942	14:35	Il-2	PQ 64872 vicinity of Zherdevo
28	21 June 1942	18:00	LaGG-3		56	22 August 1942	10:02	LaGG-3	PQ 54254 vicinity of Uljanowo
29	21 June 1942	18:02	LaGG-3		57	22 August 1942	10:07	LaGG-3	PQ 55894; Black Sea
30	21 June 1942	18:06	Pe-2		58	23 August 1942	10:15	I-180 (Yak-7)	PQ 64141
31	22 June 1942	08:26	MiG-1		59	23 August 1942	10:25	LaGG-3	PQ 55874; Black Sea
32	24 June 1942	11:35	MiG-1		60	23 August 1942	13:05	LaGG-3	PQ 54263 vicinity of Uljanowo
33	24 June 1942	16:45	LaGG-3		61	27 August 1942	14:30	LaGG-3	PQ 46424
34	24 June 1942	16:55	Boston		62	28 August 1942	06:00	I-16	PQ 47572
35	25 June 1942	13:00	LaGG-3		63	1 September 1942	09:15	LaGG-3	PQ 56454 vicinity of Gattetowo
36	25 June 1942	18:50	Yak-1		64? (Note: This claim is not listed by Mathews and Foreman.)	5 September 1942	15:58	Il-2	PQ 46823
37	25 June 1942	18:53	LaGG-3		65	26 October 1942	15:50	Il-2	PQ 49241; 10 km (6.2 mi) northeast of Stalingrad

=== Awards ===
- Iron Cross (1939) 2nd and 1st Class
- Honor Goblet of the Luftwaffe on 6 July 1942 as Oberfeldwebel and pilot
- German Cross in Gold on 13 August 1942 as Oberfeldwebel in the I./Jagdgeschwader 52
- Knight's Cross of the Iron Cross on 19 September 1942 as Oberfeldwebel and pilot in the 2./Jagdgeschwader 52 (Note: According to Scherzer as pilot in the 1./Jagdgeschwader 52.)
