= Berthold Woltze =

German genre painter (1829–1896)

- Born: 24 August 1829; Havelberg, Germany
- Died: 29 November 1896; Weimar, Germany
- Notable work: The Annoying Gentleman (1874)
- Children: Peter Woltze

Berthold Woltze (24 August 1829 – 29 November 1896) was a German genre painter, portrait painter, and illustrator.

Berthold Woltze was a professor at Weimar Saxon Grand Ducal Art School. In the period from 1871 to 1878 he published numerous of his works in the Gartenlaube newspaper. One of his most famous works is Der lästige Kavalier (The Annoying Gentleman).

He was the father of the architectural painter Peter Woltze (1860–1925).

== Gallery ==
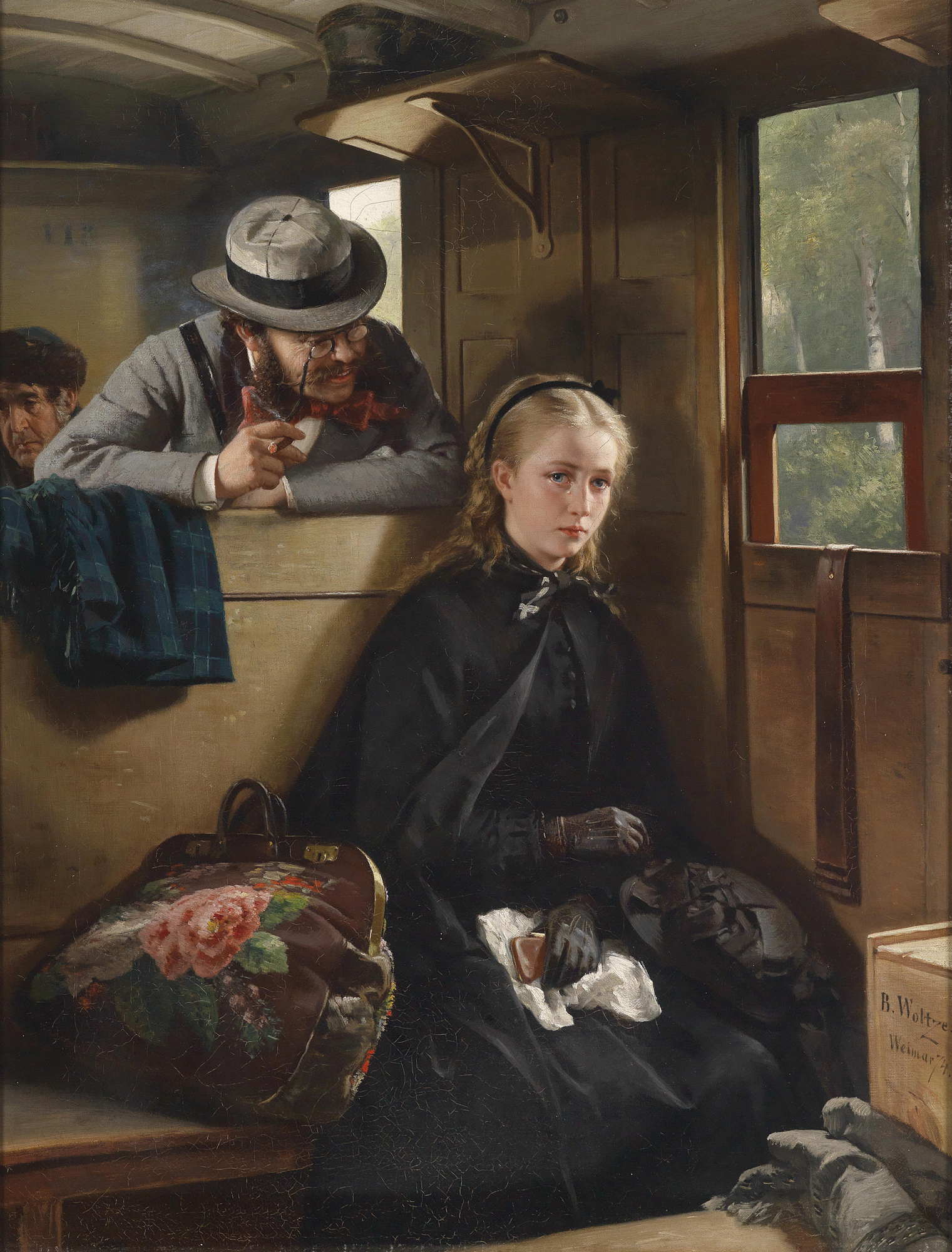
Der lästige Kavalier (The Annoying Gentleman), 1874, oil on canvas, German Historical Museum, Berlin

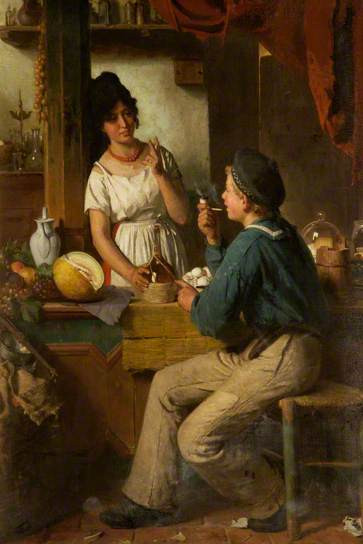
Das Schnäppchen (The Bargain), oil on canvas, Runcorn Town Hall

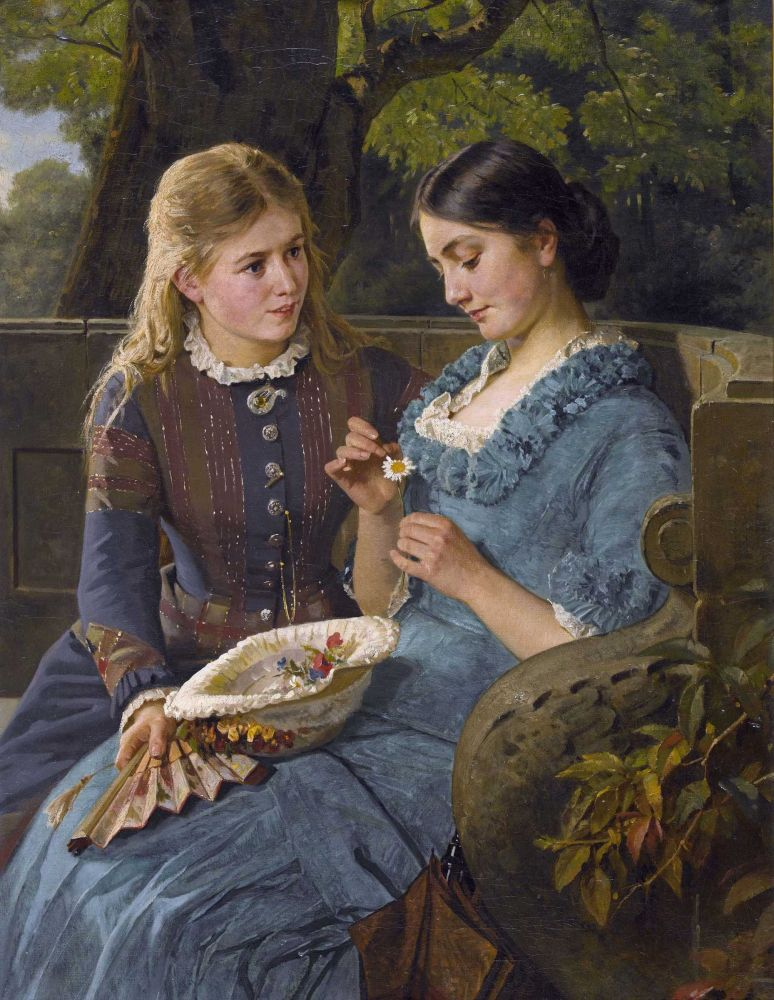
Parkszene mit verliebter junger Frau (Park Scene with a Young Woman in Love), oil on canvas, private collection

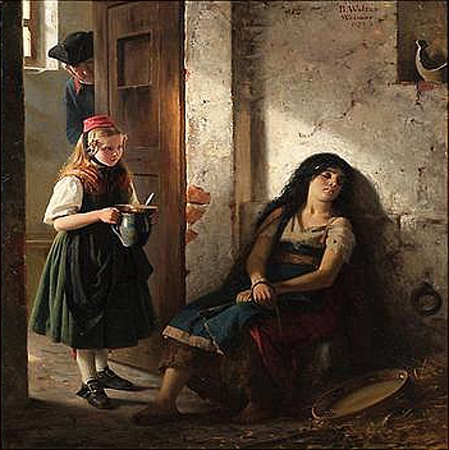
Junge Zigeunerin im Arrest (Young Gipsy under Arrest), oil on canvas, private collection

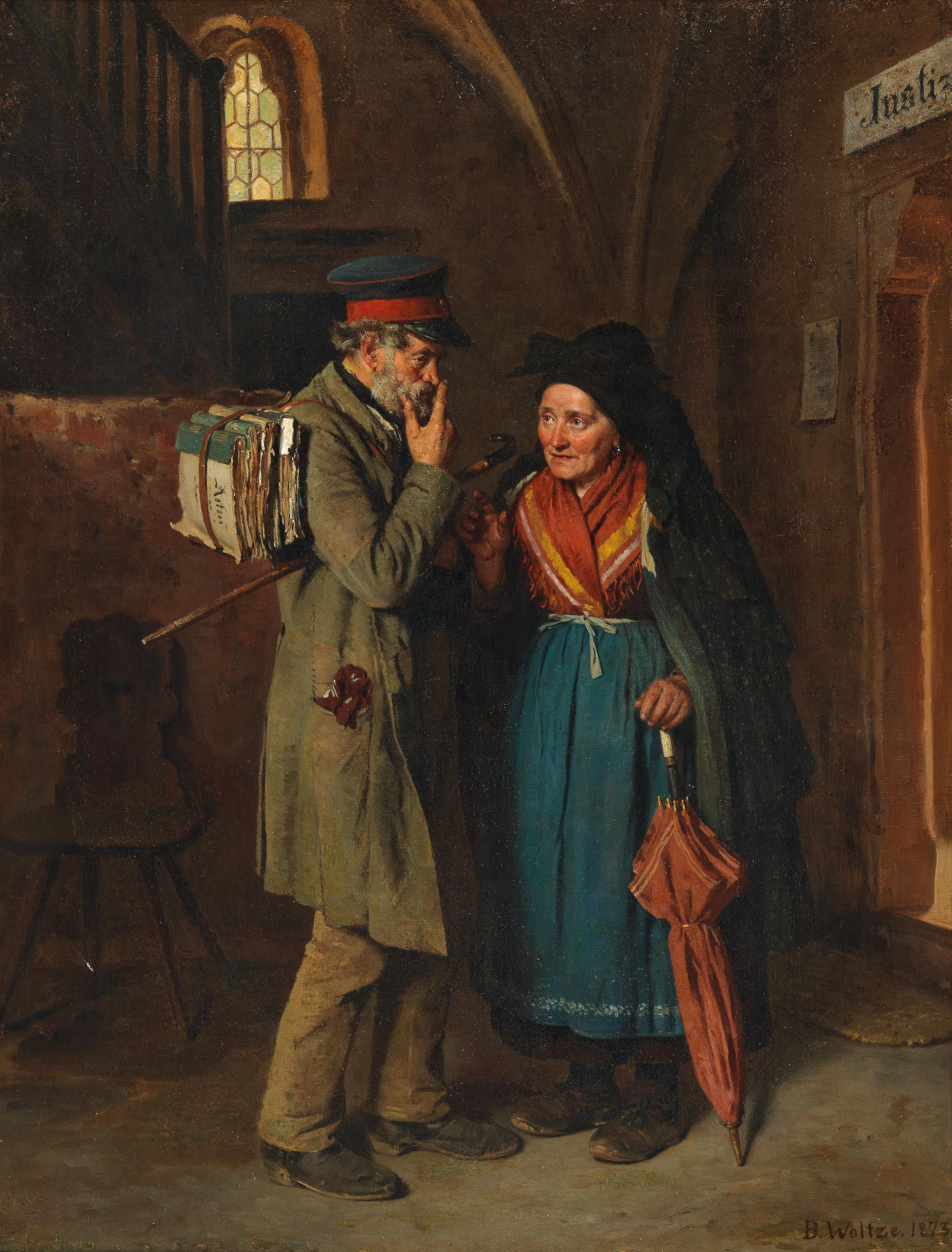
Guter Rat ist teuer! (Good Advice is Expensive!), 1873, oil on canvas, location unknown

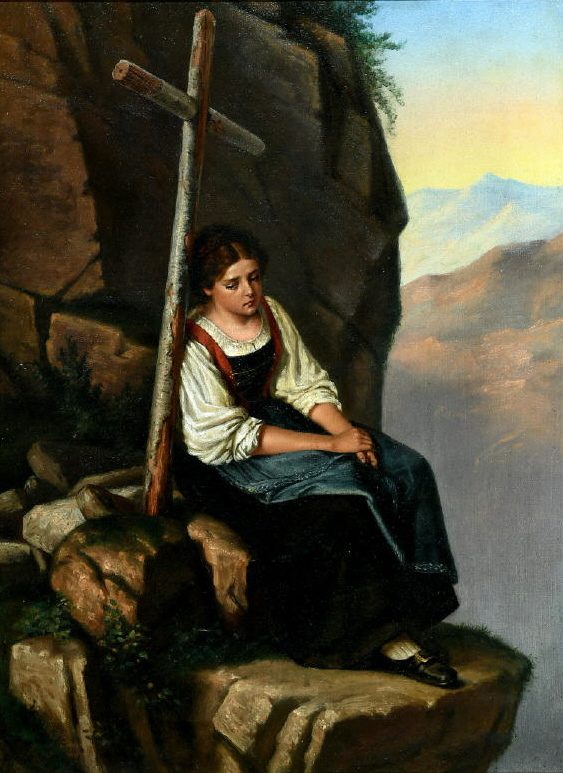
Auf einem Felsvorsprung neben einem Kreuz sitzendes Mädchen (Girl sitting on a ledge next to a cross), oil on canvas, private collection

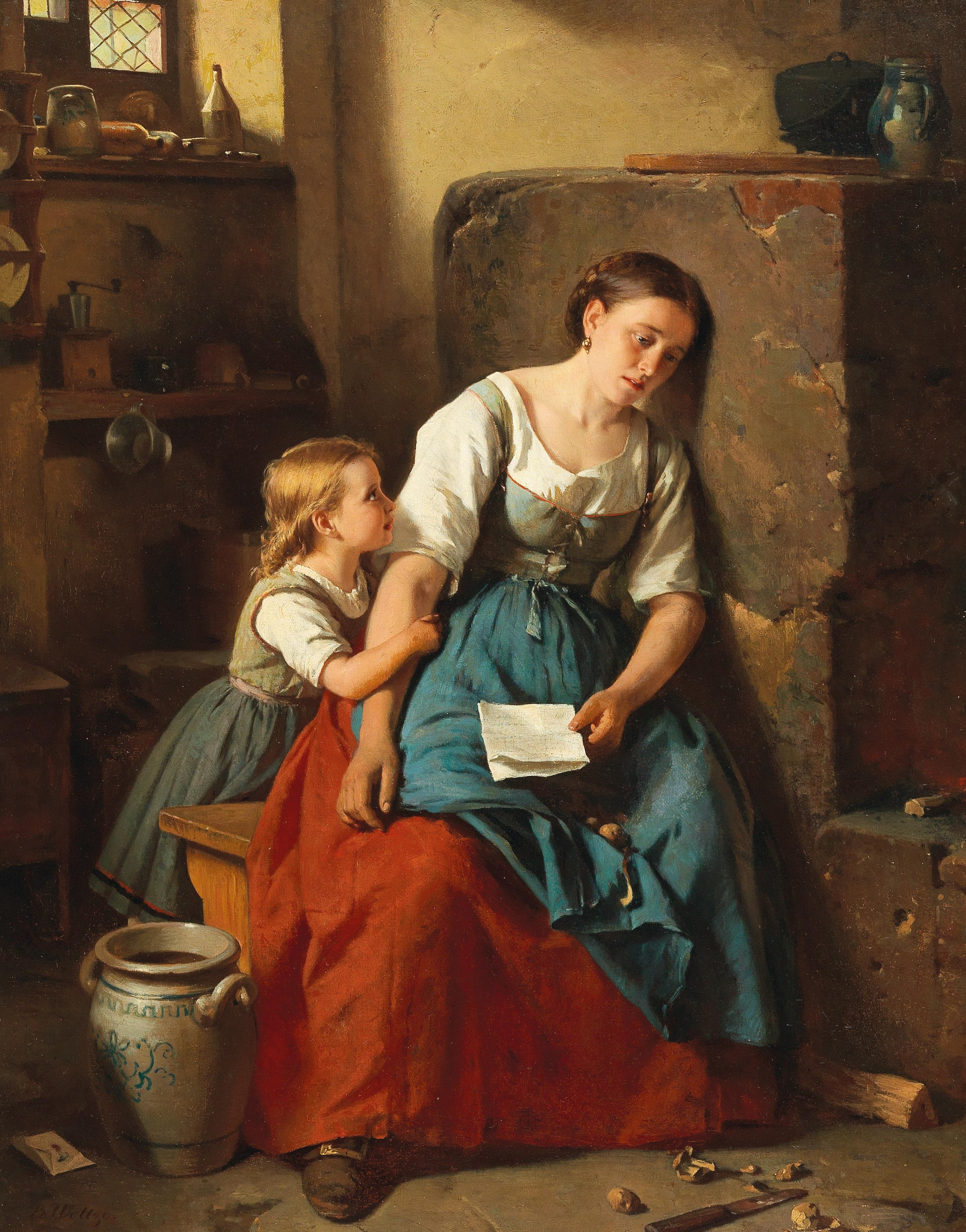
Der Brief (The Letter), oil on canvas, private collection

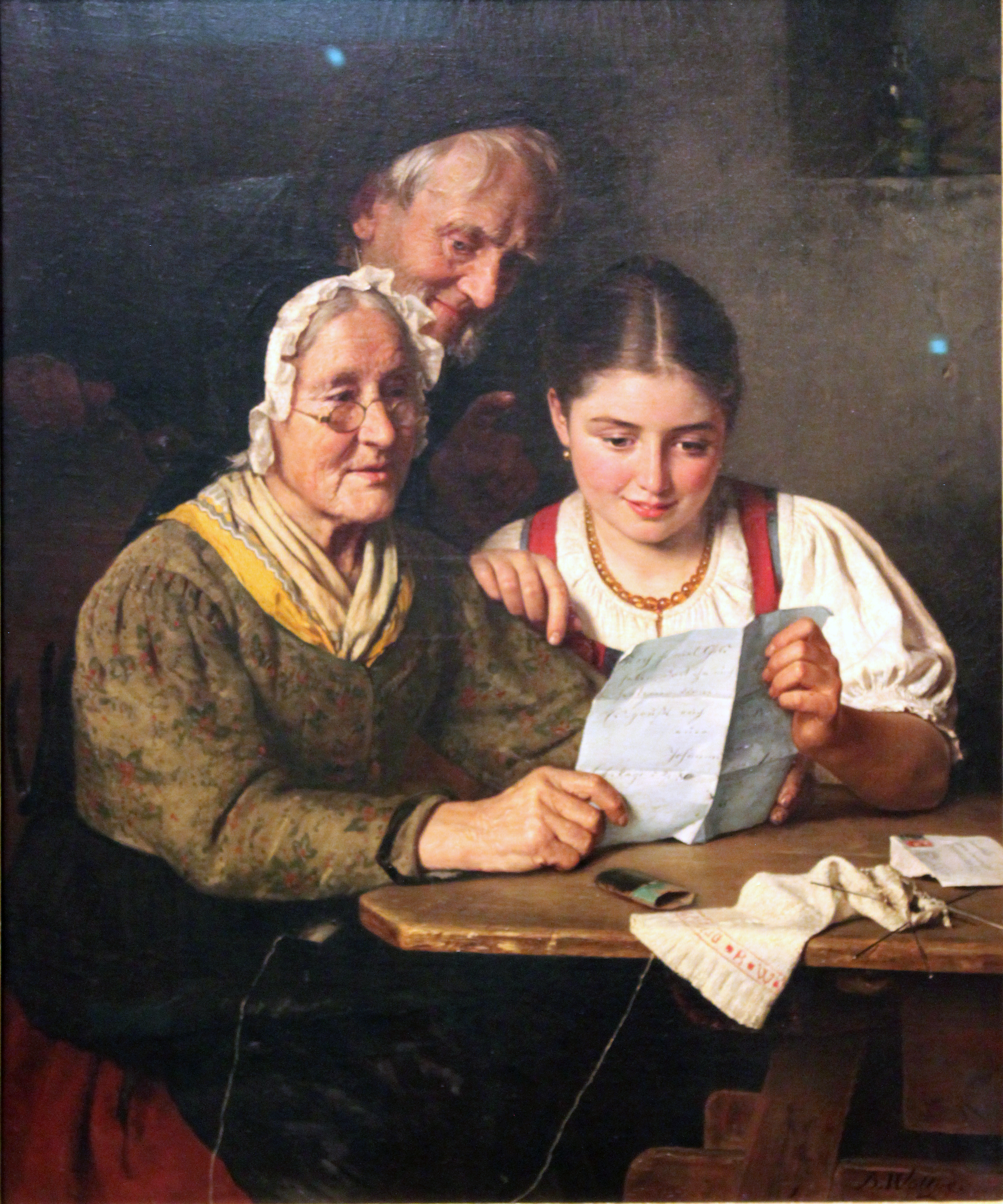
Ein Brief aus Amerika (A Letter from America), c. 1860, oil on canvas, German Historical Museum, Berlin

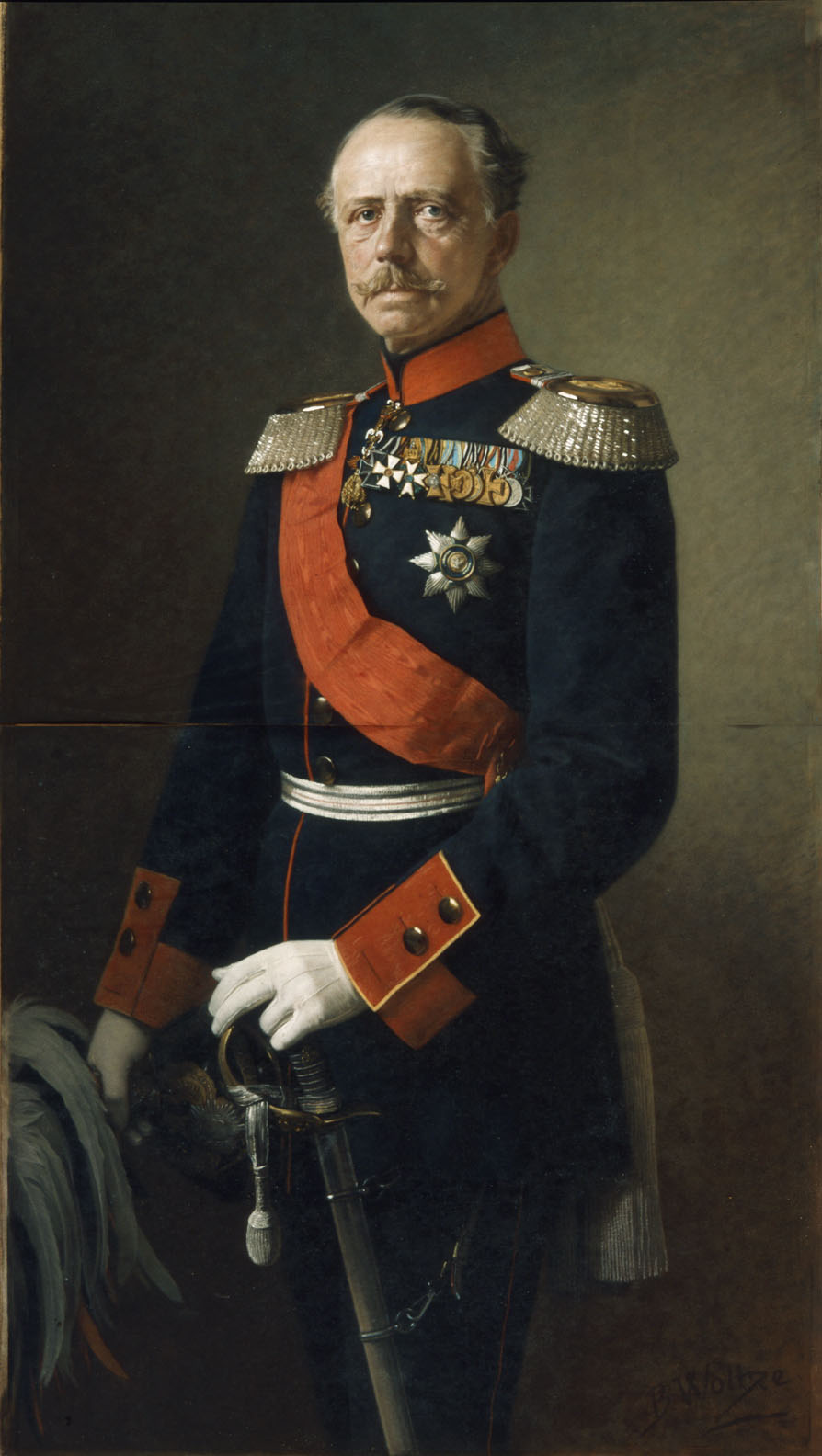
Carl Alexander Großherzog von Sachsen-Weimar-Eisenach, oil on canvas, Klassik Stiftung Weimar
