= Rudolf Berthold (footballer) =

German footballer (1903–1976)

Personal information
- Date of birth: 1 April 1903
- Date of death: December 1976 (aged 73)
- Position: Midfielder

Senior career*
Years	Team	Apps	(Gls)
1925–1935	Dresdner SC		

International career
1928	Germany	1	(0)
- * Club domestic league appearances and goals

Rudolf Berthold (1 April 1903 – December 1976) was a German international footballer.
