= Berthold Gersons =

Dutch psychiatrist and psychotraumatologist (born 1945)

Berthold Paul Rudolf Gersons
- Born: May 30, 1945 (age 81); Groningen, Netherlands
- Citizenship: Dutch
- Education: M.D., University of Amsterdam (1972); Ph.D., University of Amsterdam (1977)
- Occupations: Psychiatrist, Academic
- Employer(s): Academic Medical Center, University of Amsterdam (emeritus)

Berthold Paul Rudolf Gersons (born 30 May 1945, Groningen, Netherlands) is a Dutch psychiatrist and emeritus distinguished professor of psychiatry known for his foundational contributions to psychotraumatology, disaster mental health care, and trauma research. He developed Brief Eclectic Psychotherapy for PTSD (BEPP).

He was appointed Officer in the Order of Orange-Nassau by the Dutch monarchy for services to psychiatry and society.

== Early life and education ==
Gersons trained in medicine at the University of Amsterdam and Albert Einstein College of Medicine in New York, receiving his M.D. in 1972 and completing his psychiatry residency at the Academic Hospital of the University of Amsterdam (1972–1976). In 1977, he earned his Ph.D. with a thesis titled Mental Health Consultation in Preventive Psychiatry, supervised by P.C. Kuiper and A. Querido. He also completed psychoanalytic training at the Dutch Psychoanalytic Institute in Amsterdam between 1976 and 1981.

== Career ==
Gersons became Professor of Community Psychiatry at the Utrecht University (1984–1991). He then served as Professor of Psychiatry and Chair of the Department of Psychiatry at the Academic Medical Center (AMC), University of Amsterdam, from 1991 to 2007, continuing as Distinguished AMC Professor until 2010.

From 2007 until 2017, He served as Senior Scientific Advisor to the ARQ National Psychotrauma Center in the Netherlands.

== Contributions ==
Gersons' clinical and research focus has been post-traumatic stress disorder (PTSD) and trauma responses. In the early 1980s, his work with Dutch police officers following traumatic incidents led him to identify PTSD in first responders and to establish the first police self-help team in the Netherlands.

He is best known as the developer of Brief Eclectic Psychotherapy for PTSD (BEPP), a structured evidence-based treatment integrating elements of psychodynamic, cognitive behavioural, and directive therapies for PTSD. BEPP has been applied widely for police and trauma-exposed populations and is used internationally in clinical training and practice.

Gersons served as an advisor following events including the 1992 Bijlmermeer airplane crash, the Faro air disaster, the 2000 Enschede fireworks disaster, the Volendam café fire, and the MH17 plane disaster.

== Editorial work ==
He held editorial board positions for the Journal of Traumatic Stress and later for the European Journal for Psychotraumatology, contributing to the development of scholarly communication in the field of trauma studies.

In 2024, he published a book titled Als een ramp ons raakt (When a disaster strikes us): Ervaringen en lessen van een trauma expert.

== Honours and awards ==
- 1992 – Award from the International Society for Traumatic Stress Studies (ISTSS), Los Angeles
- 2007 – Appointed Officer in the Order of Orange-Nassau by the Dutch monarchy for services to psychiatry and society.
- 2009 – Wolter de Loos Award for Distinguished Contribution to Psychotraumatology in Europe from the European Society for Traumatic Stress Studies (ESTSS), Oslo.

== Selected publications ==
=== Books ===
- Gersons, B.P.R. (1988). Adaptive defense mechanisms in post-traumatic stress disorders and leave-taking rituals. In O. van der Hart (Ed.), Coping with Loss. New York: Irvington Publishers.
- Gersons, B.P.R., Meewisse, M.L., Nijdam, M.J. (2015). Brief Eclectic Psychotherapy for PTSD. In U. Schnyder & M. Cloitre (Eds.), Evidence-Based Treatments for Trauma-Related Psychological Disorders. Springer, Heidelberg.
- Gersons, B.P.R. (2024). Als een ramp ons raakt. Amsterdam: Uitgeverij Balans.

=== Journal articles ===
- Gersons, B.P.R., Carlier, I.V.E., Lamberts, R.D., van der Kolk, B. (2000). A randomized clinical trial of brief eclectic psychotherapy in police officers with posttraumatic stress disorder. Journal of Traumatic Stress, 13(2), 333–347.
- Lindauer, R.J., Gersons, B.P.R., van Meijel, E.P.M., Blom, K., Carlier, I.V.E., Vrijlandt, I., Olff, M. (2005). Effects of Brief Eclectic Psychotherapy in patients with posttraumatic stress disorder: Randomized clinical trial. Journal of Traumatic Stress, 18, 205–212.
- Nijdam, M.J., Baas, M.A., Olff, M., Gersons, B.P.R. (2013). Hotspots in trauma memories and their relationship to successful trauma-focused psychotherapy: A pilot study. Journal of Traumatic Stress, 26(1), 38–44.
- Smid, G.E., Kleber, R.J., de la Rie, S.M., Bos, J.B., Gersons, B.P.R., Boelen, P.A. (2015). Brief Eclectic Psychotherapy for Traumatic Grief (BEP-TG): Toward integrated treatment of symptoms related to traumatic loss. European Journal of Psychotraumatology, 6, 27324.
- Carlier, I.V.E., Gersons, B.P.R. Stress reactions in disaster victims following the Bijlmermeer plane crash. J of Traumatic Stress 10:2, 329-335, 1997
