= Berthold Korts =

German World War II fighter pilot (1912–1943)

- Korts as a Leuntnant; Note that the Knight's Cross at his neck is a photomontage
- Born: 21 May 1912; Karlsruhe
- Died: 29 August 1943 (aged 31) (MIA) disappeared near Amvrosiivka, Ukraine
- Military career
- Allegiance: Nazi Germany
- Branch: Luftwaffe
- Rank: Leutnant (second lieutenant)
- Unit: JG 52
- Commands: 9./JG 52
- Conflicts: World War II
- Awards: Knight's Cross of the Iron Cross

Berthold Korts (21 May 1912 – presumably 29 August 1943) was a German Luftwaffe military aviator during World War II, a fighter ace credited with 113 aerial victories—that is, 113 aerial combat encounters resulting in the destruction of the enemy aircraft—claimed in an unknown number of combat missions. He was "ace-in-a-day" four times, shooting down five or more aircraft on a single day.

Born in Karlsruhe, Korts was trained as a fighter pilot and posted to Jagdgeschwader 52 (JG 52–52nd Fighter Wing) in June 1942. Fighting on the Eastern Front, he claimed his first aerial victory on 6 August 1942 during Case Blue, the German strategic 1942 summer offensive in southern Russia. In July 1943, he was appointed Staffelkapitän (squadron leader) of 9. Staffel (9th squadron) of JG 52. On 17 August, Korts claimed his 100th aerial victory. A little more than a week later, on 29 August, he was awarded Knight's Cross of the Iron Cross, the highest award in the military and paramilitary forces of Nazi Germany during World War II. That day, Korts and his wingman went missing in action following combat near Amvrosiivka.

== Career ==
Korts was born on 21 May 1912 in Karlsruhe, at the time in what was the Grand Duchy of Baden of the German Empire. His military career began with the artillery before he started his pilot training in the summer of 1940. (Note: Flight training in the Luftwaffe progressed through the levels A1, A2 and B1, B2, referred to as A/B flight training. A training included theoretical and practical training in aerobatics, navigation, long-distance flights and dead-stick landings. The B courses included high-altitude flights, instrument flights, night landings and training to handle the aircraft in difficult situations.) In June 1942, holding the rank of Feldwebel, he was transferred to 9. Staffel (9th squadron) of Jagdgeschwader 52 (JG 52—52nd Fighter Wing) on the Eastern Front. (Note: For an explanation of Luftwaffe unit designations see Organisation of the Luftwaffe during World War II.) At the time, this squadron was under the command of Hauptmann Hermann Graf and one of three squadrons subordinated to the III. Gruppe (3rd group) of JG 52 commanded by Major Hubertus von Bonin. On 28 June, German forces had launched Case Blue, the strategic summer offensive in southern Russia. On 7 July, Army Group A began their advance towards the oil fields in the Caucasus.

In early August 1942, III. Gruppe was based at an airfield near the Yegorlyk River, approximately 60 kilometers (37 miles) west-southwest of Salsk. The Gruppe supported the 1st Panzer Army in its advance towards Maykop and Grozny. There, Korts claimed his first aerial victory over a Lavochkin-Gorbunov-Gudkov LaGG-3 fighter on 6 August. On 10 August, III. Gruppe was moved to Armavir and 9. Staffel was ordered to a makeshift airfield at Plastunowskaja where it supported the attack of the 17th Army across the Kuban River on Novorossiysk. The next day, Korts claimed two Douglas A-20 Havoc, also referred to as "Boston" bombers, shot down.

On 27 August, III. Gruppe reached an airfield named Gonschtakowka located north-northeast of Mozdok on the Terek. On 19 September, III. Gruppe reached an airfield named Soldatskaya, west of Mozdok. The Gruppe would remain here until 1 January 1943 but would also use airfields at Mozdok and Digora. There Korts, who flew with the Gruppenstab (headquarters unit) of III. Gruppe, shot down a Yakovlev Yak-1 fighter on 30 September, his tenth aerial victory. On 28 November, he claimed "Boston" bomber destroyed, his 21st aerial victory and last in 1942.

=== Kuban bridgehead and Kursk ===
The Gruppe was moved to the combat area of the Kuban bridgehead on 1 April 1943 where it was based at an airfield at Taman. Operating from Taman until 2 July, III. Gruppe also flew missions from Kerch on 12 May, from Sarabuz and Saky on 14 May, Zürichtal, present-day Solote Pole, a village near the urban settlement Kirovske on 23 May, and Yevpatoria on 25/26 June. Korts became an "ace-in-a-day" for the first time on 26 May, claiming four Petlyakov Pe-2 bombers and a Soviet-flown Supermarine Spitfire fighter shot down. The following day, he again claimed five aerial victories, making him an "ace-in-a-day" for the second time.

In preparation for Operation Citadel, III. Gruppe was relocated to the central sector of the Eastern Front. The Gruppe first moved to Zaporizhzhia and then to Ugrim on 3 July. There, under the command of Luftflotte 4, they supported Army Group South fighting on the southern flank of the salient. On 5 July, the first day of the Battle of Kursk, Hauptmann Günther Rall replaced von Bonin as Gruppenkommandeur (group commander) of III. Gruppe. That day, Korts claimed three LaGG-3 fighters and an Ilyushin Il-2 ground-attack aircraft. This includes a claim over a Soviet fighter shot down near Oboyan. A week later, Korts was awarded the German Cross in Gold (Deutsches Kreuz in Gold) on 12 July 1943. That day, Soviet forces launched Operation Kutuzov and advanced towards Orel from the north and east. Two days later, III. Gruppe was ordered to an airfield at Sowjetzki just north of Orel near the Oka river. There, Korts claimed four aerial victories, one on 16 July, two on 17 July, and one 18 July. On 20 July, the Gruppe moved to Ivanovka near Bryansk where it was subordinated to Jagdgeschwader 54 (JG 54—54th Fighter Wing).

=== Squadron leader and missing in action ===
Karaya emblem

Promoted to an officer's rank, Korts was appointed Staffelkapitän (squadron leader) of 9. Staffel (9th squadron), also referred to as the Karaya-Staffel of JG 52, on 27 July 1943. He replaced Oberleutnant Rudolf Trepte who had temporarily led the Staffel after Hauptmann Ernst Ehrenberg had been killed in action on 10 May. At the time, III. Gruppe was based at Ivanovka near Bryansk and engaged in the fighting near Orel during Operation Kutuzov. On 28 July, the Bryansk Front, supported by ground attack aircraft, attacked the German forces at Oryol. During the course of the day, Korts claimed a LaGG-3 fighter shot down west of Bolkhov. The following day, he claimed another LaGG-3 fighter destroyed. On 2 August, III. Gruppe moved to an airfield at Warwarowka, located south of Belgorod, where they stayed for three days. There, Korts claimed a total of fifteen aerial victories, including his 75th aerial victory on 3 August. On 4 August, strong Soviet forces breached the right defensive flank of the 4th Panzer Army. In defense of this attack, III. Gruppe was engaged in combat near Tomarovka, northwest of Belgorod. In total, the Gruppe claimed 42 aerial victories that day, including nine of which by Korts. This made him an "ace-in-a-day" for the third time.

On 5 August, the Gruppe moved to an airfield at Kharkov-Rogan, southeast of Kharkov. Flying from this airfield, Korts claimed five aerial victories until III. Gruppe was ordered to Kharkov-Waitschenko, southeast of Kharkov-Rogan, on 11 August. He claimed two LaGG-3 fighters shot down on 14 August, the day the Gruppe relocated to Pereshchepyne. Flying from Pereshchepyne, Korts reached the century mark on 17 August 1943 when he shot down two LaGG-3 fighters in the vicinity of Izium. He was the 50th Luftwaffe pilot to achieve the century mark. The following day, he claimed another LaGG-3 fighter before the Gruppe moved to Mikhaylovka. On 19 August, Korts became an "ace-in-a-day" for the fourth time, claiming three LaGG-3 fighters and two Il-2 ground-attack aircraft destroyed. On 23 August, III. Gruppe was ordered to an airfield at Makeyevka while Korts and his wingman Unteroffizier Hans-Otto Müller were sent to Kramatorsk for two days to liaise with a Romanian fighter unit there.

Korts and his unit received the announcement that he had been awarded the Knight's Cross of the Iron Cross (Ritterkreuz des Eisernen Kreuzes) on 29 August, the day he went missing in action. Flying Messerschmitt Bf 109 G-6 (Werknummer 15899—factory number), he and his wingman Müller in Bf 109 G-6 (Werknummer 15869) were last seen in combat with Soviet P-39 Airacobra fighters in the vicinity of Amvrosiivka. He was succeeded by Erich Hartmann as Staffelkapitän of 9. Staffel.

== Summary of career ==
=== Aerial victory claims ===
According to US historian David T. Zabecki, Korts was credited with 113 aerial victories. Authors Obermaier and Spick also list Korts with 113 aerial victories. Mathews and Foreman, authors of Luftwaffe Aces — Biographies and Victory Claims, researched the German Federal Archives and found records for 108 aerial victory claims, all of which claimed on the Eastern Front. The authors Prien, Stemmer, Rodeike and Bock indicate that additional five aerial victories have been claimed by Korts, two of which end of June or early July 1943, and further three on 5 August 1943.

Victory claims were logged to a map-reference (PQ = Planquadrat), for example "PQ 0516". The Luftwaffe grid map (Jägermeldenetz) covered all of Europe, western Russia and North Africa and was composed of rectangles measuring 15 minutes of latitude by 30 minutes of longitude, an area of about 360 square miles (930 km^{2}). These sectors were then subdivided into 36 smaller units to give a location area 3 km × 4 km (1.9 mi × 2.5 mi) in size.

Chronicle of aerial victories
This and the ♠ (Ace of spades) indicates those aerial victories which made Korts an "ace-in-a-day", a term which designates a fighter pilot who has shot down five or more airplanes in a single day. This and the ? (question mark) indicates information discrepancies listed by Prien, Stemmer, Rodeike, Bock, Mathews and Foreman.
Claim	Date	Time	Type	Location	Claim	Date	Time	Type	Location
– Stab III. Gruppe of Jagdgeschwader 52 – Eastern Front – 29 April 1942 – 3 February 1943
1	6 August 1942	15:20	LaGG-3	PQ 0516	12	19 October 1942	07:39	Yak-1? (Note: According to Mathews and Foreman claimed as a Lavochkin-Gorbunov-Gudkov LaGG-3.)	PQ 44421
2	14 August 1942	09:50	Boston	PQ 3425	13	30 October 1942	15:30	LaGG-3	PQ 44744
3	14 August 1942	10:10	Boston	PQ 3587	14	31 October 1942	13:50	LaGG-3	PQ 44783
4	23 August 1942	11:47	Boston	PQ 54363	15	2 November 1942	12:53	LaGG-3	PQ 44872
5	2 September 1942	12:10	LaGG-3	PQ 4445	16	17 November 1942	14:10	Il-2	PQ 44752, south of Salugardan
6	2 September 1942	15:02	Boston	PQ 44421	17	24 November 1942	08:44	LaGG-3	PQ 34437 south of Salugardan
7	6 September 1942	17:08	Boston	PQ 44471	18	27 November 1942	13:47	Il-2	PQ 44752, south of Salugardan
8	7 September 1942	17:05	I-153	PQ 44357	19	27 November 1942	13:50	LaGG-3	PQ 44731
9	10 September 1942	16:45	LaGG-3	PQ 44454, south of Mozdok	20	28 November 1942	10:25	Il-2	PQ 44761
10	30 September 1942	16:02	Yak-1	PQ 44613	21	28 November 1942	13:55	Boston	PQ 44733
11	11 October 1942	10:34	Boston	PQ 44724 east of Elkhotovo	22	9 January 1943	12:30	Boston	PQ 15491
– Stab III. Gruppe of Jagdgeschwader 52 – Eastern Front – 4 February – May 1943
23	15 April 1943	12:02	LaGG-3	PQ 34 Ost 85113, 25 km (16 mi) east of Krymskaya vicinity of Aberbijewka	36♠	26 May 1943	13:46	Pe-2	PQ 34 Ost 75333 over sea, southwest of Lobanovo
24	15 April 1943	12:06? (Note: According to Mathews and Foreman claimed at 12:56.)	LaGG-3	PQ 34 Ost 85151, northeastern edge of Abinskaja vicinity of Beregowoj	37♠	26 May 1943	17:43	Pe-2	PQ 34 Ost 75292 east of Neberdshajewskaja
25	15 April 1943	15:03	I-153	PQ 34 Ost 85143, southeast of Krymskaya	38♠	26 May 1943	17:45	Pe-2	PQ 34 Ost 85143, south-southeast of Krymskaya southeast of Krymsk
26	15 April 1943	15:05	I-16	PQ 34 Ost 85142, 1 km (0.62 mi) west of Beregowoj vicinity of Beregowoj	39♠	26 May 1943	17:48	Pe-2	PQ 34 Ost 85141, southeast of Krymskaya east of Krymsk
27	21 April 1943	08:57	LaGG-3? (Note: According to Mathews and Foreman claimed as a Lavochkin La-5.)	PQ 34 Ost 75464; Black Sea, 5 km (3.1 mi) south of Kabardinka	40♠	26 May 1943	18:05	Spitfire	PQ 34 Ost 76894 vicinity of Kijewakoje
28	21 April 1943	09:20	LaGG-3?	PQ 34 Ost 75433; 5 km (3.1 mi) southeast of Novorossiysk	41♠	27 May 1943	10:37	P-39	PQ 34 Ost 85224 northwest of Georgiyeafipskaya
29	23 April 1943	11:53	LaGG-3	PQ 34 Ost 75434 vicinity of Kabardinka	42♠	27 May 1943	14:12	P-39	PQ 34 Ost 75232, north of Krymskaya north of Krymsk
? (Note: This claim is not listed by Prien, Stemmer, Rodeike and Bock.)	28 April 1943	16:51	LaGG	Black Sea, south of Gelendzhik	43♠	27 May 1943	18:00	LaGG-3	PQ 34 Ost 76874, north of Krymskaya vicinity of Kijewakoje
30	29 April 1943	13:04	LaGG-3	PQ 34 Ost 76894 vicinity of Kijewakoje	44♠	27 May 1943	18:09	B-25	PQ 34 Ost 75234 vicinity of Krymsk
31	3 May 1943	16:59	LaGG-3	PQ 34 Ost 85181 northeast of Usun	45♠	27 May 1943	18:11	Il-2 m.H. (Note: The "m.H." refers to an Ilyushin Il-2 with rear gunner (mit Heckschütze).)	PQ 34 Ost 75232, north of Krymskaya north of Krymsk
32	8 May 1943	11:18	P-39	PQ 34 Ost 85134 northwest of Nowo-Petrowskij	46	28 May 1943	18:00	B-25	PQ 34 Ost 75232, north of Krymskaya north of Krymsk
33	8 May 1943	11:22	LaGG-3	PQ 34 Ost 75264, southwest of Krymskaya east of Nowo-Bakanskoja	47	29 May 1943	18:00	B-25	PQ 34 Ost 75232, north of Krymskaya north of Krymsk
34	8 May 1943	15:25	LaGG-3	PQ 34 Ost 85141, southeast of Krymskaya east of Krymsk	48	29 May 1943	18:01	B-25	PQ 34 Ost 75271 vicinity of Natuchajewskaja
35	15 May 1943	11:12	LaGG-3	PQ 34 Ost 85113, east of Krymskaya east of Krymsk					
– 8. Staffel of Jagdgeschwader 52 – Eastern Front – 4 February – May 1943
49	1 June 1943	07:00	LaGG-3	PQ 34 Ost 86741, northeast of Kijewskoje vicinity of Trojzkaja	53	4 June 1943	17:52	P-39	PQ 34 Ost 85753 vicinity of Abinsk
50? (Note: This claim is not listed by Mathews and Foreman.)	1 June 1943	07:01	LaGG-3	PQ 34 Ost 86741, northeast of Kijewskoje	54	10 June 1943	14:35	LaGG-3	PQ 34 Ost 66891 over sea, south of Wennlowka
51	1 June 1943	09:34	Spitfire	PQ 34 Ost 75262 south of Krymsk	55	10 June 1943	14:40	LaGG-3	PQ 34 Ost 66291; Black Sea, southwest of Anapa
52	4 June 1943	07:29	La-5	PQ 34 Ost 75232, north of Krymskaya north of Krymsk	56	10 June 1943	14:43	LaGG-3	PQ 34 Ost 65432 vicinity of Anapa
According to Prien, Stemmer, Rodeike and Bock, Korts' aerial victories numbered 57 and 58 were claimed either end of June or early July. These claims are not documented by Mathews and Foreman.
59	4 July 1943	15:12	LaGG-3	PQ 35 Ost 61172; 10 km (6.2 mi) west of Krasnyi Lyman	65	8 July 1943	14:14	LaGG-3	PQ 35 Ost 62871; 10 km (6.2 mi) north of Prokhorovka
60	5 July 1943	05:25	LaGG-3	PQ 35 Ost 52773; 20 km (12 mi) south-southwest of Oboyan	66	8 July 1943	17:57	Il-2 m.H.	PQ 35 Ost 61243 vicinity of Lutschki
61	5 July 1943	11:37	LaGG-3	PQ 35 Ost 61181 vicinity west of Krasnyi Lyman	67	16 July 1943	17:11	La-5	PQ 35 Ost 63362; 25 km (16 mi) north-northwest of Maloarkhangelsk
62	5 July 1943	12:11	LaGG-3	PQ 35 Ost 61182 vicinity west of Krasnyi Lyman	68	17 July 1943	05:10	Pe-2	PQ 35 Ost 54751 vicinity of Khotynets
63	5 July 1943	18:20	Il-2 m.H.	PQ 35 Ost 61424; 20 km (12 mi) northeast of Belgorod	69	17 July 1943	19:28	LaGG-3	PQ 35 Ost 54494 west of Zubkovo
64	6 July 1943	12:13	LaGG-3	PQ 35 Ost 61233; 25 km (16 mi) east of Prokhorovka	70	18 July 1943	14:28	Il-2 m.H.	PQ 35 Ost 54624
– 9. Staffel of Jagdgeschwader 52 – Eastern Front – 27 July – 29 August 1943
71	28 July 1943	14:06	LaGG-3	PQ 35 Ost 54662 west of Bolkhov	93	7 August 1943	17:40	Il-2 m.H.	PQ 35 Ost 61562; 20 km (12 mi) south-southwest of Belgorod
72	1 August 1943	14:04	LaGG-3	PQ 35 Ost 64541 vicinity of Telchje	94	9 August 1943	16:20	La-5	PQ 35 Ost 61841; 25 km (16 mi) northeast of Kharkiv
73	3 August 1943	14:26	Pe-2	PQ 35 Ost 61273; 20 km (12 mi) north-northeast of Belgorod	95	10 August 1943	09:20	Il-2 m.H.	PQ 35 Ost 61731; 25 km (16 mi) north-northeast of Kharkiv
74	3 August 1943	14:56	LaGG-3	PQ 35 Ost 61224; 10 km (6.2 mi) east of Prokhorovka	96	14 August 1943	12:30	LaGG-3	PQ 35 Ost 51811; 10 km (6.2 mi) north of Bohodukhiv
75	3 August 1943	15:02	LaGG-3	PQ 35 61193; 10 km (6.2 mi) east of Krasnyi Lyman	97	14 August 1943	12:32	LaGG-3	PQ 35 Ost 51811; 10 km (6.2 mi) north of Bohodukhiv
76	3 August 1943	18:35	LaGG-3	PQ 35 Ost 61473; 5 km (3.1 mi) south of Belgorod	98	15 August 1943	06:23	LaGG-3	PQ 35 Ost 70723 vicinity of Izium
77♠	4 August 1943	05:05	LaGG-3	PQ 35 Ost 61332, northwest of Belgorod; 10 km (6.2 mi) north of Tomarovka	99	17 August 1943	05:25	LaGG-3	PQ 35 Ost 70754; 10 km (6.2 mi) south of Izium
78♠	4 August 1943	07:40	LaGG-3	PQ 35 Ost 61332, northwest of Belgorod; 10 km (6.2 mi) north of Tomarovka	100	17 August 1943	05:25	LaGG-3	PQ 35 Ost 70754; 10 km (6.2 mi) south of Izium
79♠	4 August 1943	12:44	LaGG-3	PQ 35 Ost 61354; 15 km (9.3 mi) west of Tomarovka	101	18 August 1943	05:55	LaGG-3	PQ 35 Ost 70752; 10 km (6.2 mi) south of Izium
80♠	4 August 1943	12:52	LaGG-3	PQ 35 Ost 61324; 10 km (6.2 mi) south of Krasnyi Lyman	102♠	19 August 1943	10:08	LaGG-3	PQ 34 Ost 88282, west of Kuybyshev; 5 km (3.1 mi) southeast of Jalisawehino
81♠	4 August 1943	13:06	Il-2 m.H.	PQ 35 Ost 61414; 15 km (9.3 mi) north of Belgorod	103♠	19 August 1943	10:09	LaGG-3	PQ 34 Ost 88263; 10 km (6.2 mi) east of Maryniwka
82♠	4 August 1943	16:10	LaGG-3	PQ 35 Ost 61482; 15 km (9.3 mi) southeast of Belgorod	104♠	19 August 1943	13:40	LaGG-3	PQ 34 Ost 88274; 15 km (9.3 mi) west-northwest of Jalisawehino
83♠	4 August 1943	18:39	LaGG-3	PQ 35 Ost 61354; 15 km (9.3 mi) west of Tomarovka	105♠	19 August 1943	16:37	Il-2	PQ 34 Ost 88161; 10 km (6.2 mi) northeast of Kuteinykove
84♠	4 August 1943	18:40	LaGG-3	PQ 35 Ost 61323; 10 km (6.2 mi) south of Krasnyi Lyman	106♠	19 August 1943	16:37	Il-2	PQ 34 Ost 88162; 10 km (6.2 mi) northeast of Kuteinykove
85♠	4 August 1943	18:53	LaGG-3	PQ 35 Ost 61354; 15 km (9.3 mi) west of Tomarovka	107	20 August 1943	06:10	Il-2	PQ 34 Ost 88262 vicinity of Jalisawehino
86	5 August 1943	07:02	LaGG-3	PQ 35 Ost 61352; 10 km (6.2 mi) southwest of Belgorod	108	20 August 1943	15:58	P-39	PQ 34 Ost 88262 vicinity of Jalisawehino
87	5 August 1943	09:40	Il-2 m.H.	PQ 35 Ost 61443; 10 km (6.2 mi) north of Belgorod	109	21 August 1943	14:58	Il-2	PQ 34 Ost 88291, west of Kuybyshev; 15 km (9.3 mi) east of Jalisawehino
88?	5 August 1943	—	LaGG-3		110	22 August 1943	13:58	P-39	PQ 34 Ost 88281; 5 km (3.1 mi) southwest of Jalisawehino
89?	5 August 1943	—	LaGG-3		111	22 August 1943	18:12	Il-2	PQ 34 Ost 88422; 20 km (12 mi) south of Jalisawehino
90?	5 August 1943	—	LaGG-3		112	22 August 1943	18:14	Il-2	PQ 34 Ost 88422; 20 km (12 mi) south of Jalisawehino
91	6 August 1943	16:04	LaGG-3	PQ 35 Ost 61441; 10 km (6.2 mi) north of Belgorod	113	23 August 1943	06:07	Il-2 m.H.	PQ 34 Ost 88252, Marinowka; 25 km (16 mi) east-northeast of Kuteinykove
92	7 August 1943	17:40	Il-2 m.H.	PQ 35 Ost 61534; 15 km (9.3 mi) southwest of Belgorod					

=== Awards ===
- Iron Cross (1939) 2nd and 1st Class
- Honor Goblet of the Luftwaffe on 1 February 1943 as Feldwebel and pilot
- German Cross in Gold on 12 July 1943 as Leutnant in the Stab III./Jagdgeschwader 52 (Note: According to Obermaier on 23 August 1943.)
- Knight's Cross of the Iron Cross on 29 August 1943 as Leutnant and pilot in the 9./Jagdgeschwader 52

== See also ==
- List of people who disappeared
