= George A. Seitz =

United States Navy officer

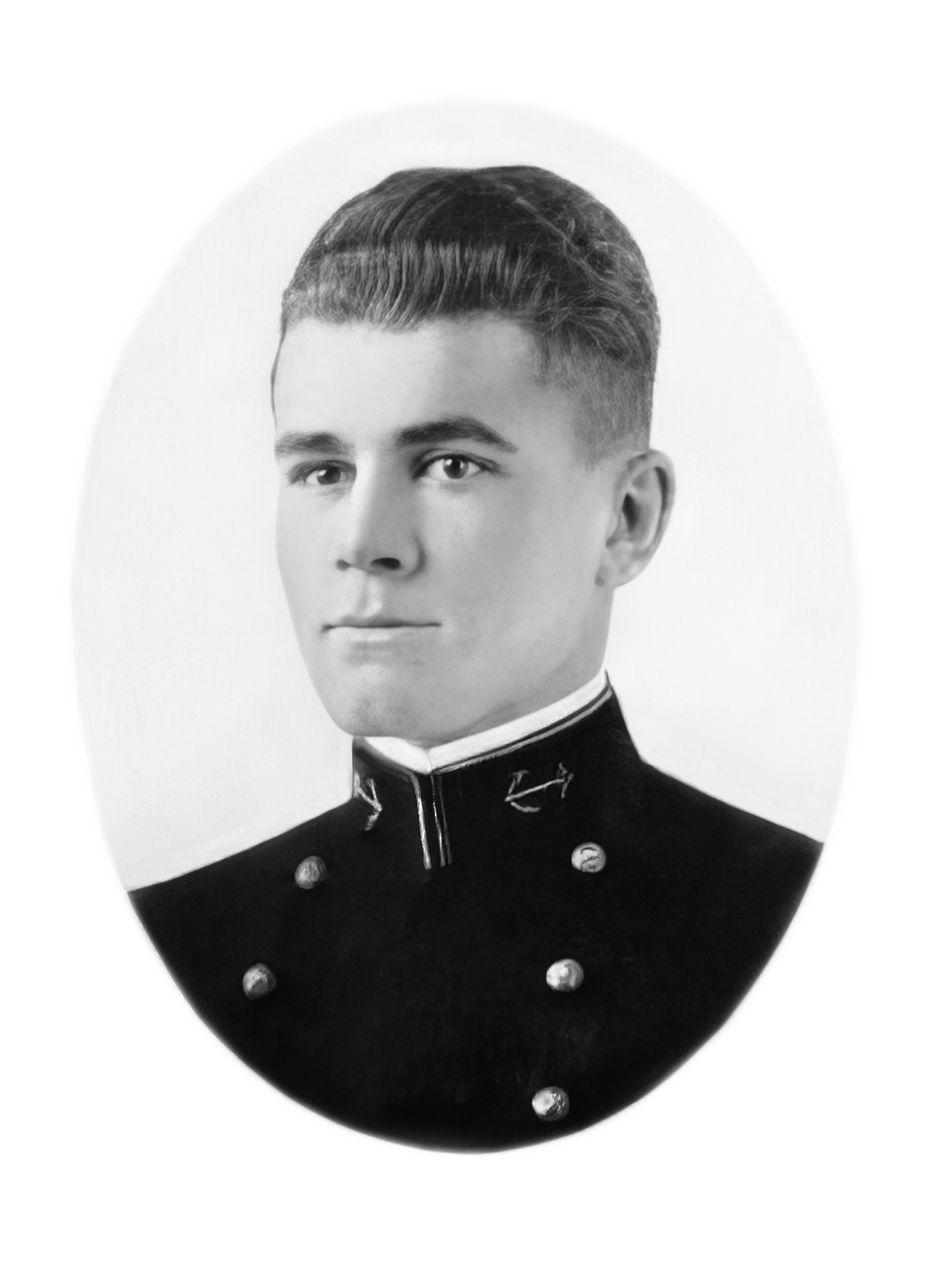
George A. Seitz graduated from the Naval Academy in Annapolis

George A. Seitz was an officer in the United States Navy. He was born March 13, 1897, in Rochester, New York, the son of Albert and Caroline (Dubelbeiss) Seitz. Seitz graduated from the Naval Academy in Annapolis in 1920. He attended graduate school at MIT and organized the transport of material to North Africa during the Allied invasion and occupation. He later commanded the USS Bunker Hill, and helped to save that ship during the worst suicide attack against America before September 11. After the war, Seitz became commander of the Marshall Islands, with the rank of commodore. According to US Navy records, he was flown from his headquarters at Kwajalein, on October 15, 1947, for treatment of a severe case of bronchial pneumonia. He died of a "heart ailment" ten days later. He was fifty years old. America detonated two atomic bombs in the Marshall Islands before Commodore Seitz died.

== Honors ==
A school in the Marshall Islands is named for Seitz.

George Seitz Elementary School, Kwajalein, Marshall Islands, Pacific Ocean https://web.archive.org/web/20091107151117/http://www.smdc.army.mil/KWAJ/Logistics/Personnel/education.html
