= Berthold Seitz =

German university teacher (born 1962)

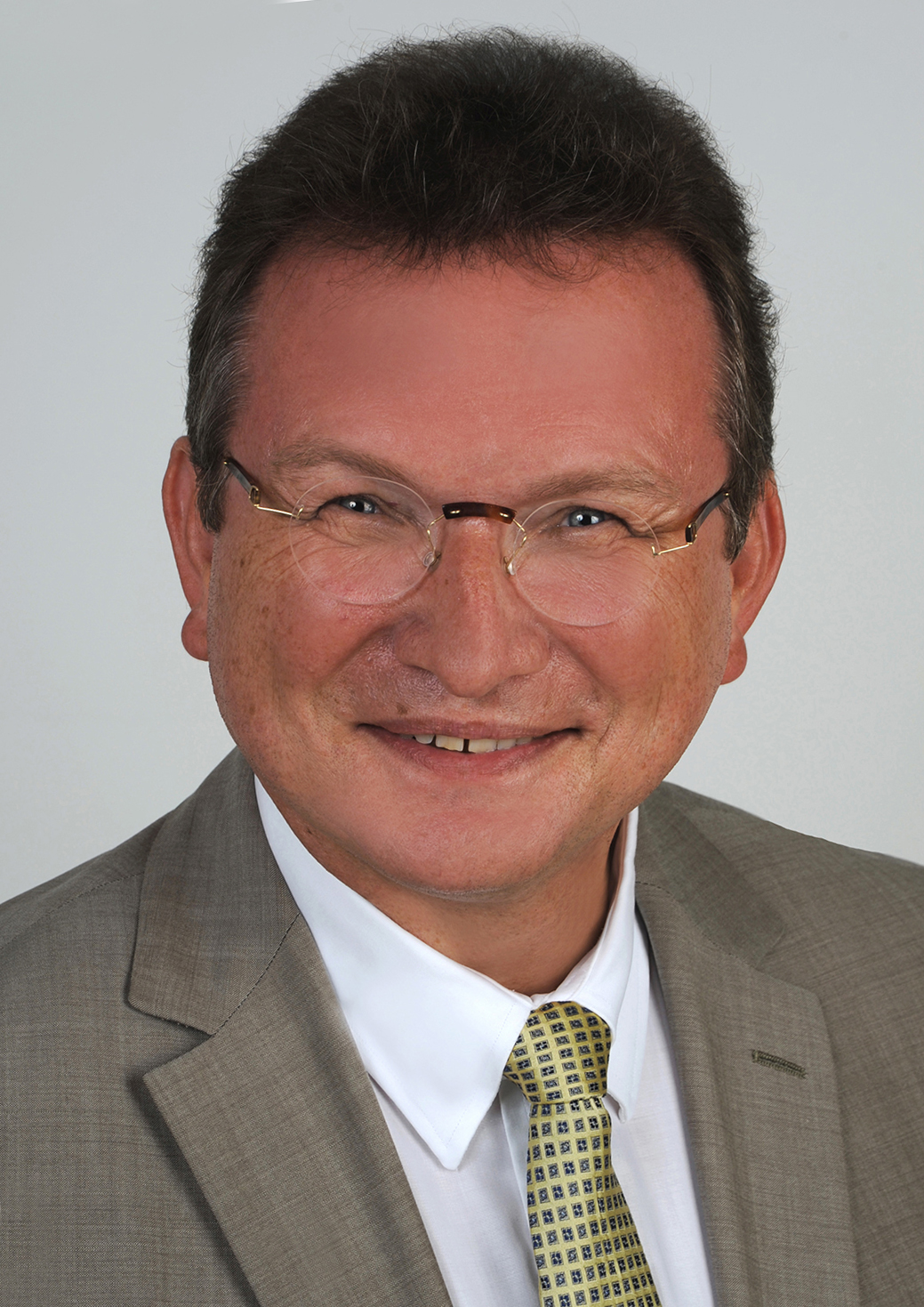
- Born: June 25, 1962 (age 64); Schwarzenbach (Bavaria), Germany
- Known for: Cornea transplantation (methods for minimisation of postoperative astigmatism), cataract surgery and artificial lens-calculation after refractive corneal surgery
- Scientific career
- Fields: Ophthalmology
- Workplaces: Saarland University Medical Center (Homburg, Saarland)

Berthold Seitz (born 25 June 1962 in Schwarzenbach (Bavaria)) is a German ophthalmologist, professor and director of the Department of Ophthalmology at the Saarland University Medical Center in Homburg, Saarland. He is known for his scientific contributions in the fields of cornea transplantation (especially methods for minimisation of postoperative astigmatism), cataract surgery and artificial lens-calculation after refractive corneal surgery as well as techniques of amniotic membrane transplantation and its histological integration patterns in the cornea.

== Biography ==
Seitz studied human medicine at the University of Erlangen-Nuremberg from 1981 to 1988. He received his medical license in 1988 and qualified as a medical specialist for ophthalmology in Munich in 1993. He completed the European Board of Ophthalmology Examination (FEBO) in Paris in 1996. He was promoted to doctor of medicine with magna cum laude at the University of Erlangen-Nuremberg in 1989.

Seitz was Research-Fellow of Cornea and Refractive Surgery at the Doheny Eye Institute, University of Southern California School of Medicine, Los Angeles. He was senior physician at the Department of Ophthalmology at the University of Erlangen-Nuremberg and became head of outpatient service. Since 1993, Seitz has been establishing and heading the cornea outpatient service and also the refractive surgery unit in Erlangen since 1996. He was heading the Cornea Bank Erlangen since 2000 and went main surgeon for corneal transplantation. In 1997, he became an elected member in the scientific advisory board of the German Transplantation Society (DTG) for the scope of cornea. Seitz habilitated himself in the field of ophthalmology ("Nonmechanical microsurgery of the cornea") in Erlangen in 1999.

Seitz was a cofounder of the Cornea section in the German Ophthalmological Society (DOG) in 2002 and has been acting as its speaker since then. In 2002, he was named associate professor of ophthalmology at the University of Erlangen. He was promoted to full professor and director of the Department of Ophthalmology at the Saarland University Medical Center in 2006. Under Seitz a new professorship for experimental ophthalmology was established in Homburg, Saarland. In 2012, Seitz became a member of the National Academy of Sciences Leopoldina. Seitz was president of the DOG in 2012. and was elected to head of the program commission of the DOG in 2015.

== Scientific contribution ==
The field of Seitz's scientific publications encompasses the themes:

- Cornea transplantation (especially methods for minimisation of postoperative astigmatism)
- Cataract surgery and artificial intraocular lens calculation after refractive cornea surgery
- Accommodative and toric artificial lens in cataract surgery
- Nonmechanical corneal surgery with lasers
- Application of femtosecond laser at the eye
- Phototherapeutic keratectomy (PTK)
- Amniotic membrane transplantation

== Memberships in international organisations ==
- Cofounder and speaker of the Corneal Section in the DOG since 2002

== Honors and awards ==
Seitz received many national and international awards, among them are:

- Achievement Award of the American Academy of Ophthalmology „for contributions made to the Academy, its scientific and educational programs, and to ophthalmology“. Awarded at the 104th anniversary of the American Academy of Ophthalmology 22–25 October 2000, Dallas/Texas/USA
- Distinguished Service Gold Medal 2010 for meritorious and exemplary services to ophthalmology. Awarded at the Joint Meetings of the XVIII Annual Conference of the Bombay the Ophthalmologists’ Association (BOA) and the VIII International Academy for Advances in Ophthalmology “Eye Advance 2010” Mumbai, India, 13–15 August 2010
- DOC-Silver-Medal 2010 for extraordinary performances and special merits for the International Congress of the German Ophthalmic Surgeons. Awarded at the 23rd International Congress of the German Ophthalmic Surgeons. Hamburg, 21 October 2010
- Election as a member of the German Academy of Sciences Leopoldina, August 2011
- Ryan-Belfort-Medal of the American Brazilian Ophthalmological Association (ABOA) “to be awarded to outstanding leaders in Ophthalmology who have made major contributions to ophthalmic education and international cooperation”. Awarded at the XXXVII Congresso Brasileiro / XXX Pan-American Congress, Rio de Janeiro, Brazil, 7 August 2013
- Amber Cornea in Gold „for outstanding dissemination of knowledge of corneal diseases and in recognition of scientific, medical and teaching achievements”. Awarded at the 7th International Symposiums „Advances in diagnosis and treatment of corneal diseases”, Wisla, Poland, 05-7 March 2015
- Research prize of the DOC 2015. Awarded 13 June 2015 at the 28th International Congress of the German Ophthalmologic Surgeons, Leipzig, 11–13 June 2015
- DOC-Silver Medal 2015 for extraordinary performances and special merits for the International Congress of the German Ophthalmic Surgeons. Awarded at the 28th International Congress of the German Ophthalmic Surgeons in Leipzig, 12 June 2015
- Chibret Gold medal 2015 for extraordinary merits in the ophthalmology and in the cooperation between German and French ophthalmology. Awarded at the 113. Congress of the German Ophthalmological Society in Berlin 3 October 2015.
- Stephan J. Ryan Doheny Society of Scholars 2016 to recognize the professional contributions of fellows, residents, faculty, and international scholars who trained at Doheny Eye Institute and have become major leaders in US and international ophthalmology. Awarded at the Doheny Society of Scholars Annual Meeting in conjunction with the Doheny Clinical Challenges Conference in Los Angeles, January 23, 2016.
- Since February 2016: “Director of ICO-Fellowships”
- Ernst-von-Bergmann-Plakette 2016 of the Bundesärztekammer for “Merits of medical education”. awarded by the president of the Medical Association of the Saarland September 12, 2016, Saarbrücken

== Publications ==
Seitz published 580 scientific articles, reviews in journals and book chapters (Jan. 2017)

PubMed Publication list B Seitz
