= Fred Berthold =

American theologian and academic (1922–2019)

Fred Berthold (December 9, 1922 – September 18, 2019) was an American theologian, currently the Preston Kelsey Professor of Religion, Emeritus, at Dartmouth College, in Hanover, New Hampshire.
