= Berthold E. Schwarz =

American psychiatrist and paranormal investigator (1924–2010)

Berthold Eric Schwarz, MD (October 24, 1924 – September 16, 2010) was an American psychiatrist and a researcher in spirituality and paranormal activity.

== Early life and education ==
Schwarz was born in Jersey City, New Jersey; his father, Berthold T.D. Schwarz, was a physician, and his mother, Thyra Schwarz, was a nurse.

He graduated from Dartmouth College with a Bachelor of Arts in 1945, and from Dartmouth Medical School and New York University School of Medicine in 1950 with an MD. He interned at Mary Hitchcock Memorial Hospital, Hanover, New Hampshire, from July 1950 to June 1951, and completed a Fellowship in Psychiatry at the Mayo Clinic Alix School of Medicine, Rochester, Minnesota, from 1951 to 1955. He earned an MS in psychiatry at the University of Minnesota in 1957.

== Career ==
Schwarz was certified in psychiatry by the American Board of Psychiatry and Neurology in March 1957. He was a Diplomate of the American Board of Psychiatry and Neurology, a Fellow of the American Association for the Advancement of Science, and a Distinguished Life Fellow of the American Psychiatric Association.

He was in private practice for 45 years, in Montclair, New Jersey, from 1958 to 1982, and in Vero Beach, Florida, from 1982 to 2004.

Schwarz wrote more than 185 scholarly or scientific articles, many focusing on psychiatric, psychoanalytic and electrophysiological subjects. He had a strong lifelong interest in paranormal research, and was a member of the Academy of Spirituality and Paranormal Studies and a Fellow of the American Society for Psychical Research. He wrote frequently for the Journal of Spirituality and Paranormal Studies, and many of his books deal with paranormal research. His books include:

- A Psychiatrist Looks at ESP (Signet Mystic Books/1968)
- The Jacques Romano Story (University Books/1968)
- Everyday Life: Parent-Child Telepathy (Garrett Publications/1971)
- Psychic Nexus: Psychic Phenomena in Psychiatry(Van Nostrand Reinhold/1980)
- UFO-Dynamics (Rainbow Books/1983,1988)
- Miracles of Peter Sugleris (Eagle Wing Books/1993)
- Psychiatric and Paranormal Aspects of Ufology (White Buffalo Books/1999)
- Parent-Child Tensions (co-author with Bartholomew A. Ruggieri, MD) (J.B. Lippincott/1958)
- You Can Raise Decent Children (co-author with Bartholomew A. Ruggieri, MD) (Arlington House/1971)

Schwarz believed that paranormal abilities such as telepathy are common, and that serious paranormal research has been hampered by fraud and deception. He advocated for systematic and objective scientific study of the paranormal, and carried out a number of paranormal investigations himself.

== Stella Lansing case ==
Schwarz investigated the case of Stella Lansing and her films which allegedly recorded "mysterious" objects. He authored a dedicated paper.
