= Gartenlaube =

The word "Gartenlaube" (German for garden arbor) can refer to:

- Die Gartenlaube, a major German weekly magazine published 1853–1937, then 1938-1944 as Die neue Gartenlaube
- "Gartenlaube Waltz", an 1895 waltz by Johann Strauss II
