= Herbert König =

German graphic artist, illustrator and watercolorist

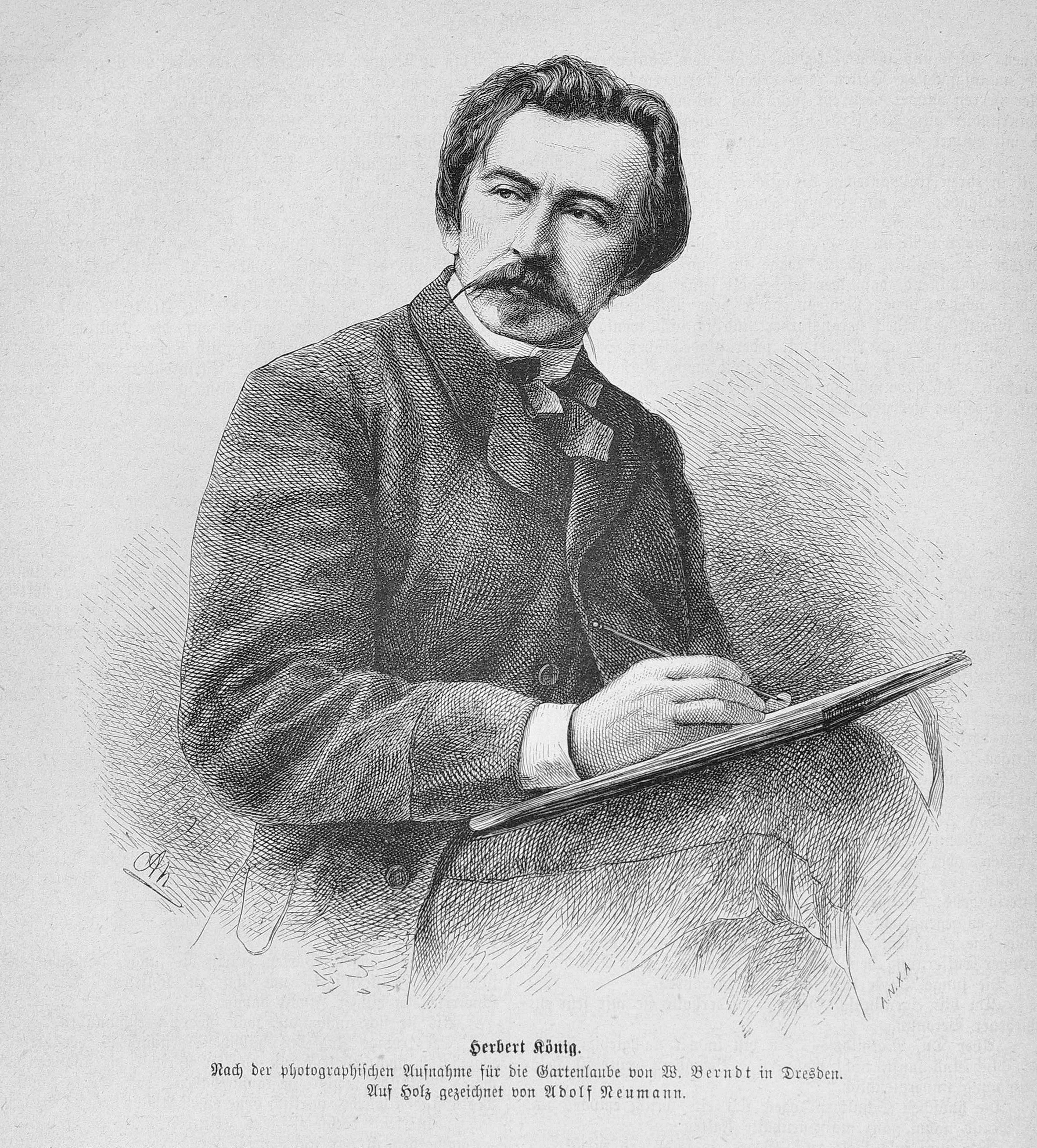
Herbert König, engraving by Adolf Neumann (1875)

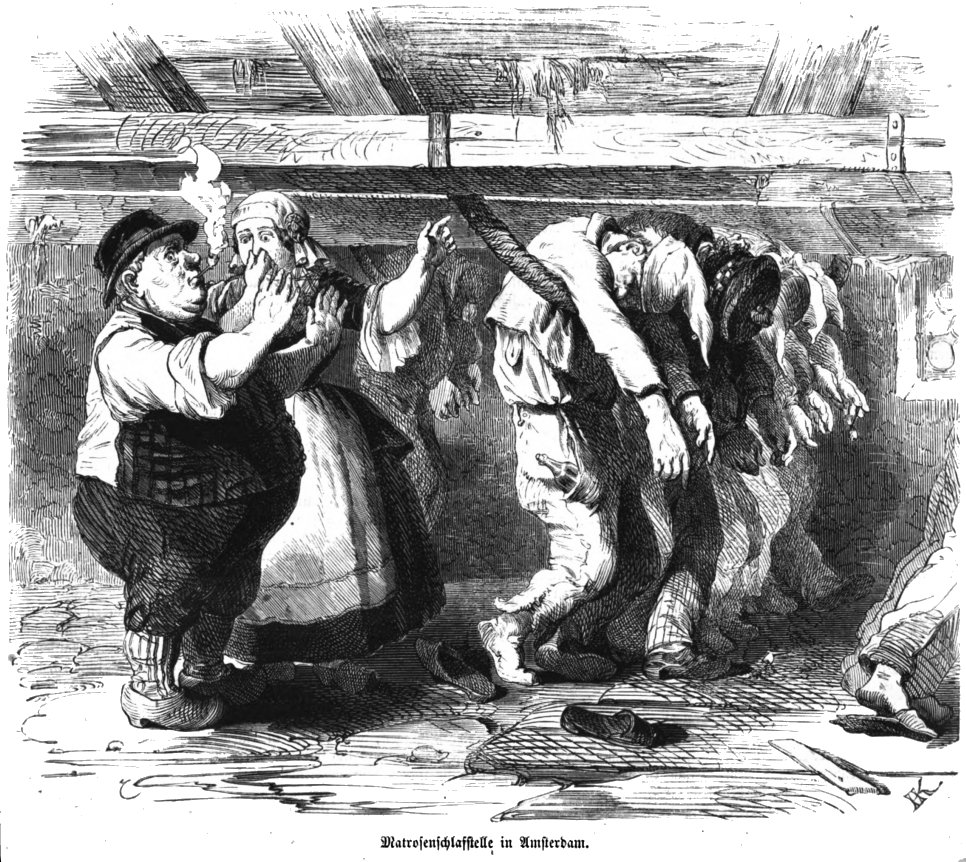
A "schlafstelle" (sleeping place) for sailors in Amsterdam, from Die Gartenlaube (1855)

Herbert König (c. 1820 - 13 June 1876) was a German graphic artist, illustrator and watercolorist.

== Life and work ==
After he had completed his training at the Dresden Academy of Fine Arts, he joined a theater company, where he tried his hand at acting and directing. During the German Revolution, he gave up the stage and settled in Munich; working as a draftsman and caricaturist.

He eventually earned his living with humorous and satirical sketches for several newspapers and magazines; notably the Fliegende Blätter.

His frequent study trips took him to Austria, Hungary, Belgium and the Netherlands. In 1852, he accepted an offer in Leipzig; becoming a staff illustrator for Die Gartenlaube and the Illustrirte Zeitung. He later moved to Berlin, where he stayed for five years, creating portraits of notable people; primarily actors and other entertainers.

He then returned to Saxony and settled in Niederlößnitz (now a district of Radebeul), where he built a Swiss style home, known as the Villa Hedwig. He died there in 1876, after becoming ill during a trip to Italy.

His book illustrations include those for Fritz Wildhaus Abenteuer zu Wasser und zu Lande (Fritz Waldhaus' Adventures on Sea and Land) by Friedrich Gerstäcker; published posthumously.
