= Fritz Jöde =

German composer, musicologist and music educator (1887–1970)

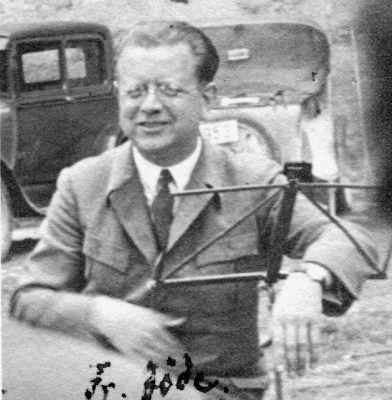
Fritz Jöde, 1932

Fritz Jöde (2 August 1887 − 19 October 1970) was a German music educator and one of the leading figures in the Jugendmusikbewegung (youth music movement).

== Life ==
Born in Hamburg, Jöde was the son of a master shoemaker. After his studies, Jöde first worked as a teacher at an Volksschule in Hamburg and joined the youth movement in 1916. At first he was a musical autodidact. Due to his achievements in the field of folk music, he was released from teaching duties to study musicology. In the years 1920 and 1921 Jöde studied in Leipzig, mainly with Hermann Abert. Subsequently, Jöde became a lecturer at the Royal Music Institute of Berlin in 1923. There he founded the first state youth music school in the same year. In 1926 Jöde also initiated so-called "open singing lessons". From 1930 he was entrusted with the direction of the seminar for folk and youth music at the academy, to which he was still affiliated.

After the seizure of power by the Nazis in 1933, he was granted a leave of absence "until further notice". For this leave of absence, an article by Pfitzner biographer Walter Abendroth in the Berliner Lokal-Anzeiger as well as others in the Zeitschrift für Musik and the Allgemeine Musikzeitung may have played a role. Furthermore, there was a "Declaration against Jöde" in the latter two newspapers, which was signed by Hans Pfitzner, Paul Pretzsch, Heinz Pringsheim and Paul Schwers, among others.

In 1934, the collection Der Musikant: Lieder für die Schule, edited by Jöde was published by Georg Kallmeyer Verlag (Wolfenbüttel, Berlin 1934). The songbook is divided into seven chapters:

1. "Kinderlieder und Spiele: teilweise mit einem Melodieinstrument" (pp. 7–70)
2. "Bunte Lieder: hin und wieder mit freien zweiten Stimmen und mit Instrumenten" (pp. 71–134)
3. "Alte und neue Lieder: für Einzel-, Wechsel- und Chorgesang, einstimmig, zweistimmig und mit Instrumenten" (pp. 135–198)
4. "Volks- und Kunstliede [sic!]: meist mit polyphonem Satz mit und ohne Instrumentalbegleitung" (pp. 199–262)
5. "Lieder und Gesänge: von Praetorius, Scheidt, Schütz, Händel, Mozart, Beethoven, Schubert, Bruckner und anderen Meistern mit und ohne Instrumentalbegleitung" (pp. 263–326)
6. "Ein- und mehrstimmige Gesänge mit und ohne Instrumentalbegleitung von Joh. Seb. Bach" (pp. 327–386)
7. "Deutschland im Lied" (pp. 387–418)

In the last chapter of Deutschland im Lied, the title picture is marked with a swastika. Here are songs that propagate the strengthening of Hitler Germany, for example Heinrich Spitta (1933): "Erwachen", canon for two voices after words by Friedrich Schiller (1798): Und setzet ihr nicht das Leben ein, nie wird euch das Leben gewonnen sein. and by Otto Riethmüller (1933): "Deutschlands Erwachen" (set by Heinrich Spitta), with the 3rd verse goes, Stand einst ein graues Heer, rang von den Alpen zum Meer. Kämpfe du mit für das künftige Land, Arbeit und Freiheit für jeglichen Stand. Kämpferland, Hitlerland, schirm dich Gottes Hand. (Once there was a grey army, struggling from the Alps to the sea. Fight with us for the future land, work and freedom for all classes. Fighter country, Hitler country, may God's hand protect you).

Due to disciplinary proceedings in October 1936, Jöde was relieved of all offices with effect from 26 February 1937; also some of his writings were banned. In 1937, however, he became head of the Munich Youth Radio and in 1938 head of the Hitlerjugend playing group there. From 1939 to 1945 he worked as a teacher at the Mozarteum in Salzburg. On 1 January 1940 he joined the National Socialist German Workers' Party (member number 7.792.080). From 1940 to 1944 he was also the editor of the Zeitschrift für Spielmusik.

Jöde, who had lived in Bad Reichenhall since 1941, first became director of the local Protestant church choir after the end of the Second World War in 1945. From 1947 to 1952 he was director of the Office for Youth and School Music in Hamburg. From 1951 to 1953, also in Hamburg, he directed the subject of music education at the Academy of Music. He then went to Trossingen to head the International Institute for Youth and Folk Music.

In 1957 Jöde was awarded the Order of Merit of the Federal Republic of Germany.

Jöde died at the age of 83 on 19 October 1970 in Hamburg. He was buried at the Nienstedten Cemetery.

Jöde's pedagogical principles had grown out of the youth music movement. His aim was to create "a singing youth" and "a singing people". The (school) child should also be looked after outside school. Open singing lessons at markets and squares in the big cities were intended to build up a sense of community and to fight against pop songs and jazz, as well as to protest against "bourgeois hypocrisy of art" in opera houses and concert halls. Jöde's main principle was: "Even making music is better than listening to music." So his main concern was to stimulate the youth.

== Work (song collections) ==
- Ringel-Rangel-Rosen (1913)
- 1813 im Liede (A collection of folk and popular songs from the time of the Wars of Liberation against Napoleon, the German campaign of 1813, 1913)
- Der kleine Rosengarten (Song compositions to poems by Hermann Löns, 1917, new edition 1950)
- Der Musikant (1923)
- Der Kanon, 3 volumes (1925–26); complete volume (1928/1959/1997), ISBN 3-7877-1030-2
- Das Chorbuch (1925)
- Die Singstunde (song sheets, 1929)
- Frau Musica (a songbook for the home, 1929)
- Der Pott (1936)
- Alte Madrigale (and other a cappella songs for mixed choir from the 16th and the beginning of the 17th century, 1948)

== Works (music theoretical writings) ==
- Musik und Erziehung. Ein pädagogischer Versuch und eine Reihe Lebensbilder aus der Schule. Zwißler, Wolfenbüttel 1919.
- Die Lebensfrage der neuen Schule Saal, Lauenburg/Elbe 1921.
- Musikschulen für Jugend und Volk. Ein Gebot der Stunde. Zwißler, Wolfenbüttel 1924.
- Die Kunst Bachs. Dargestellt an seinem Inventionen. "Um darneben einen starken Vorschmack von der Komposition zu überkommen" (Organik 1, ZDB-ID 2253442-8). Kallmeyer, Wolfenbüttel 1926.
- as editor: Handbücher für Musikerziehung. Kallmeyer, Wolfenbüttel 1927–1932, ZDB-ID 2219290-6.
  - Volume 3: Fritz Jöde: Elementarlehre der Musik gegeben als Anweisung im Notensingen.
    - Volume 3, 1: Erwerbung des Stufenraumes unter Annahme eines relativen Orientierungspunktes.
      - Volume 3, 1, 1: Das Stufenreich. 1927.
  - Volume 5: Fritz Jöde: Das schaffende Kind in der Musik. Eine Anweisung für Lehrer und Freunde der Jugend
    - Volume 5, 1: Zur Theorie des Schaffens. 1928;
    - Volume 5, 2: Aus der Praxis des Schaffens. 1928.
- Kind und Musik. Eine Einführung (Schriften der Schulmusikgruppe Berlin 1, ZDB-ID 2219407-1). Comenius among others, Berlin et al. 1930.
- Volume in the series: Bausteine für Musikerziehung und Musikpflege. Werkreihe B. 1951–1957, ZDB-ID 1038275-6.
- 104 references in the German National Library.
