= Berta Behrens =

German novelist (1848–1912)

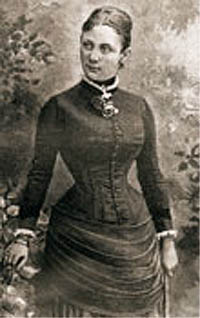
Berta Behrens.

Bertha Behrens (7 September 1848, Thale – 9 September 1912) was a German novelist, who used the pen name W. Heimburg (AKA Wilhelmine Heimburg). She completed Das Eulenhaus, a posthumous novel by Marlitt in the Gartenlaube, in which periodical most of her novels appeared. She is the daughter of Charlotte Birch-Pfeiffer, a German actress and dramatist. The following is a list of some of her works:

- Aus dem Leben meiner alten Freudin (1879; twelfth edition, 1908)
- Lumpenmüllers Lieschen (1879)
- Ihr einziger Bruder (1882; fifteenth edition, 1909)
- Waldblumen (1882; sixth edition, 1894)
- Trudchens Heirat (1884)
- Dazumal, eight stories (1887)
- Um fremde Schuld (1895)
- Antons Erben (1898)
- Sette Oldenroths Liebe (1902)
- Gesammelte Romane und Novellen (ten volumes, Leipzig, 1894–97)
- Dr. Danz und seine Frau (1903)
- Wie auch wir vergeben (1907)
- Ueber steinige Wege (1908)
- Der Stärkere (1909)
- Familie Lorenz (1910)
