= Adolf Neumann =

German engraver (1825–1884)

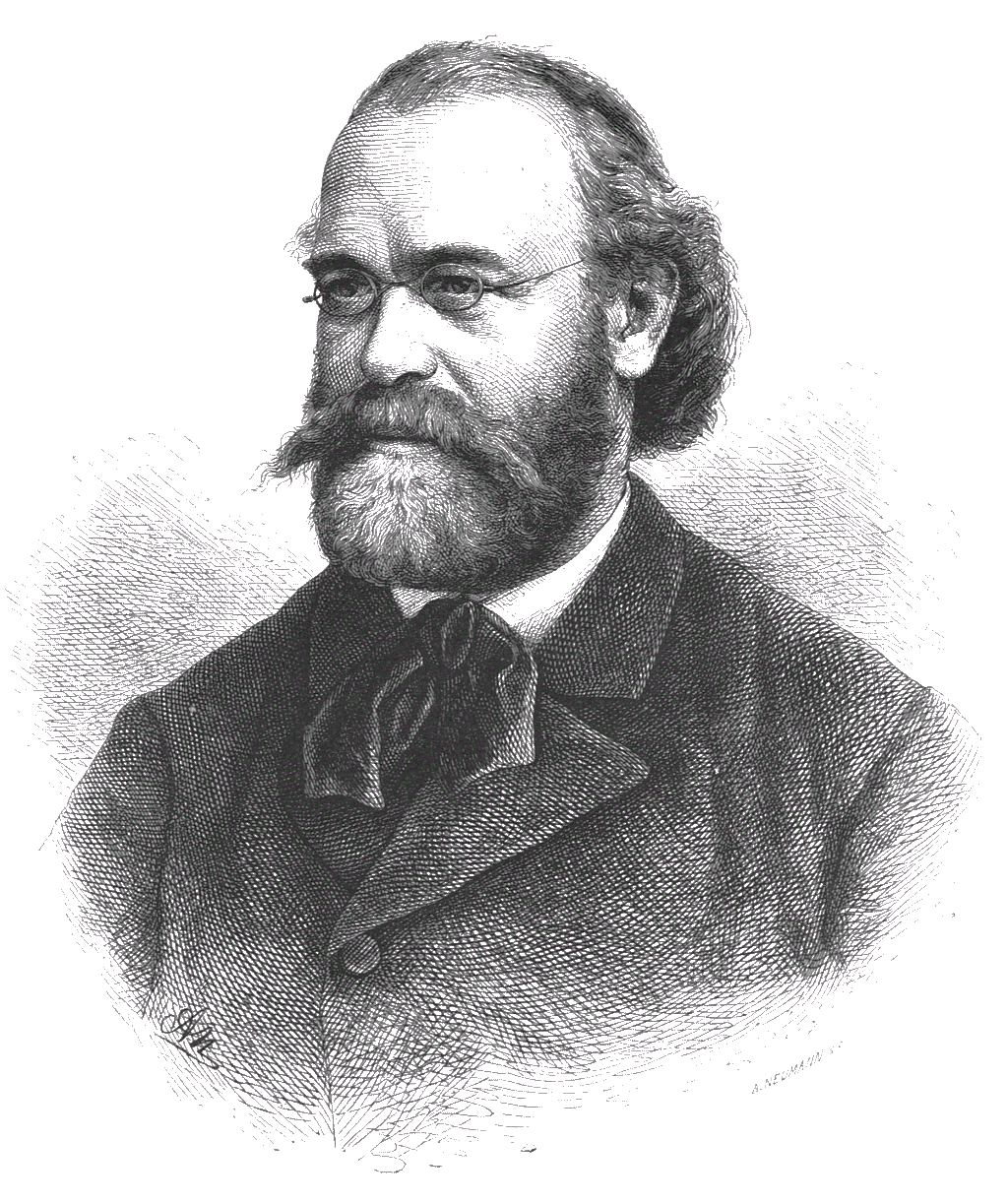
- Self-portrait, from Die Gartenlaube, 1876
- Born: Friedrich Gustav Adolf Neumann; 5 June 1825; Leipzig, Kingdom of Saxony
- Died: 20 November 1884 (aged 59); Leipzig, Saxony, Germany

Friedrich Gustav Adolf Neumann (5 June 1825 – 20 November 1884), was a German painter and engraver. Many of his portraits were published in Die Gartenlaube and the Illustrirte Zeitung. His brother was the wood engraver August Neumann.

His father worked as a colorist. Although his family was very poor, he gained the approval of Veit Hanns Schnorr von Carolsfeld, who accepted him as his student at the Academy of Fine Arts. Later, he worked in the studio of copper engraver Henry Winkles and took lessons from Carl Werner and Lazarus Gottlieb Sichling, who became his friend and supported him after his father's death.

He was best known for his portraits, especially those of musicians, including Franz Schubert, Robert Franz, and August Wilhelm Ambros.
