= Max Ring =

German physician & writer (1817–1901)

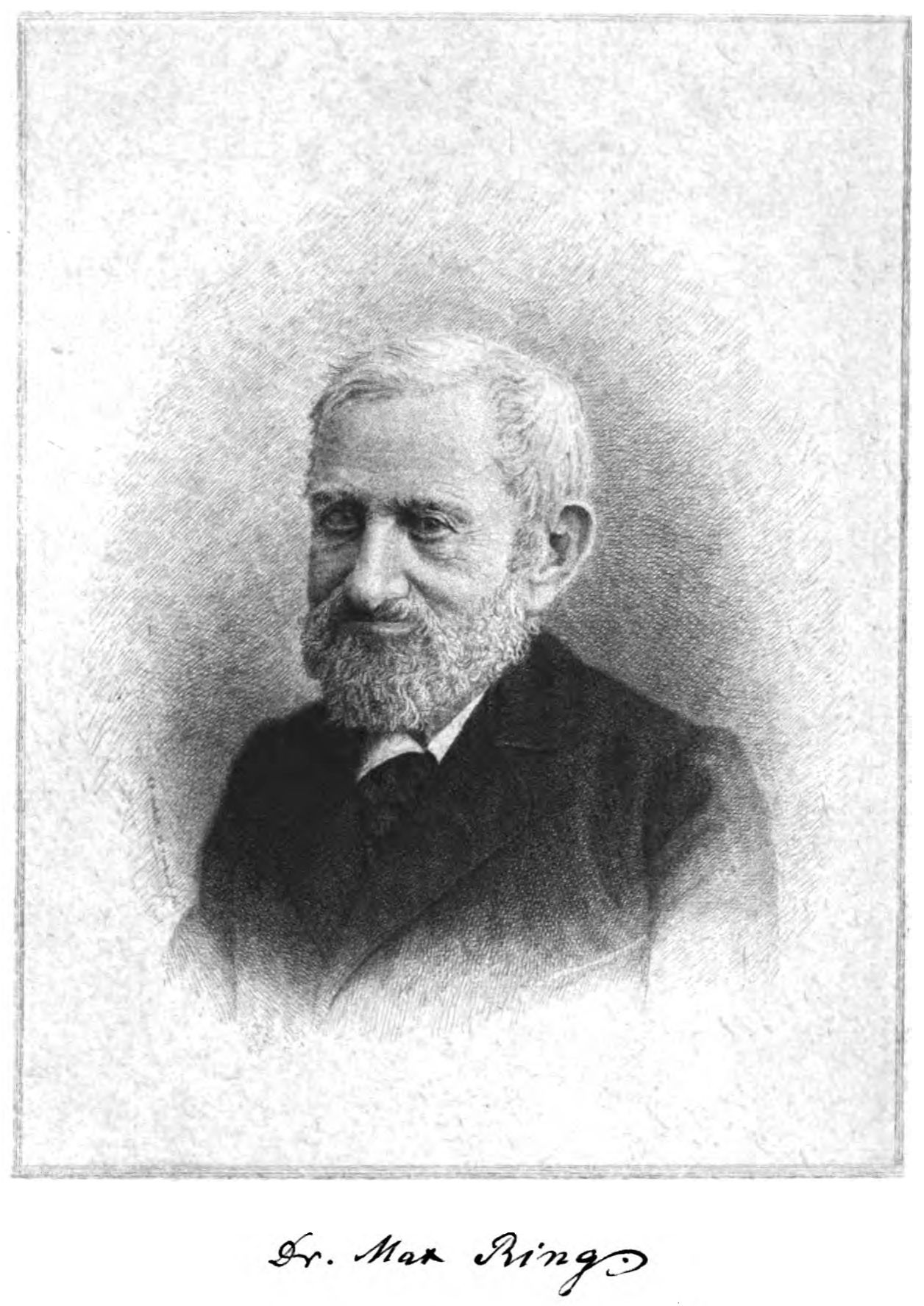
- Born: Marcus Ring; 4 August 1817; Zauditz, Austrian Empire
- Died: 28 March 1901 (aged 83); Berlin, Prussia
- Occupations: physician, novelist, poet, and dramatist

Max Ring (August 4, 1817 – March 28, 1901) was a German physician, novelist, poet, and dramatist.

== Biography ==
Max Ring was born in the town of Zauditz, Austrian Empire, the son of a farmer.

He attended the Jewish community school in Gleiwitz and showed literary talents, writing his first poem at the age of 8. He began studying medicine at the University of Breslau in 1836. To complete his medical studies, in 1838 he travelled to Berlin with his childhood friend Ludwig Traube. It was there where he met young intellectuals such as Moritz Carrière, Karl Grün and Heinrich Bernhard Oppenheim and made his debut as an author in 1839 with a volume of poems that he edited together with his friend Moritz Fränkel.

Graduating as in 1840, he began practicing medicine at Gleiwitz where he experienced the hardship and social conflicts in the countryside. He worked as a physician during the outbreak of the typhus epidemic in Upper Silesia and described the suffering he witnessed in a socially critical paper on the causes and course of the epidemic. This text underwent censorship. During the revolution in 1848, Ring took part in the political movement as a staunch democrat and was attacked with an anti-Semitic pamphlet by his opposition.

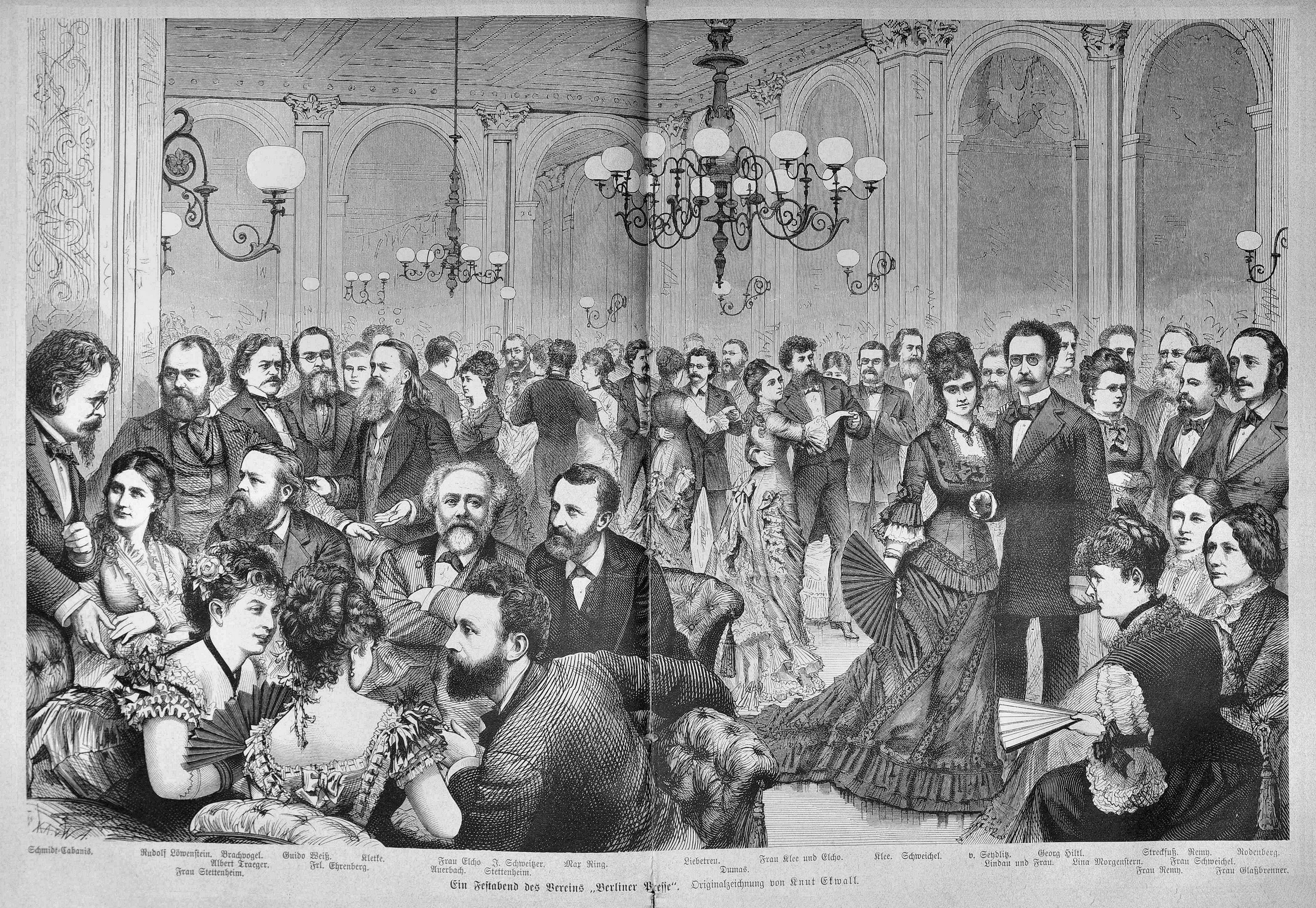
Die Gartenlaube meeting (1877)

In 1849, Ring published his first novel, Berlin and Breslau, about the revolution. In 1850 he moved to Berlin, where he quickly made contact with literary circles. He befriended Theodor Mundt, Karl Gutzkow, and Theodor Mügge, and became a close family friend and doctor of Karl August Varnhagen von Ense. In 1856 he married Elvira Heymann, daughter of the publisher Karl Heymann, and in 1862 discontinued his medical practise in order to devote himself to literature exclusively. He seldom left Berlin and made only a few long trips to Austria, Switzerland and Northern Italy. In 1890 the King of Prussia awarded him the title of honorary professor. He died in Berlin.

Ring achieved his first success as a dramatist in the comedy "Unsere Freunde," and his second, in the drama "Ein Deutsches Königshaus." He became a very active contributor to Die Gartenlaube and, from 1863 to 1865 when the publication was prohibited in Prussia, he created a similar, spin-off publication in Berlin under the title Der Volksgarten.

== Heinrich von Kleist's grave inscription ==
Heinrich von Kleist was a German poet, who died with his lover Henriette Vogel in a suicide pact. Because of the nature of their deaths, Kleist and Vogel were denied church burial and were instead interred where they died and the gravesite fell into disrepair for most of the nineteenth century. It was freshened up when Kleist became admired by late-century nationalists and was commemorated with a large stonehead for the 1936 Olympic Games. A poem of Ring's was inscribed on the tomb. In 1941, Georg Minde-Pouet, a Nazi Kleist scholar and librarian, informed Germany's Propaganda Minister Joseph Goebbels that the quatrain on the tomb was written by a Jew, and Ring's words were removed.

== Works ==
- Gedichte. Leipzig, 1839 (with Moritz Fränkel)
- De Typho Abdominali, Berlin 1840 (Diss.; Digitalisat)
- Revolution. Breslau, 1848. (Gedicht)
- Berlin und Breslau. 1847–1849. Roman. 2 Bde., Breslau, 1849
- Die Genfer. Trauerspiel in 5 Akten. Breslau, 1850
- Die Kinder Gottes. Roman. 3 Bde. Breslau, 1851
- Der große Kurfürst und der Schöppenmeister. Historischer Roman aus Preußens Vergangenheit. 3 Bde. Breslau, 1852
- Stadtgeschichten. 4 Bde. Berlin, 1852
- Aus dem Tagebuches eines Berliner Arztes. Berlin, 1856
- Hinter den Coulissen. Humoristische Skizzen aus der Theaterwelt. Berlin, 1857
- John Milton und seine Zeit. Historischer Roman. Frankfurt a. M., 1857
- Rosenkreuzer und Illuminaten. Historischer Roman aus dem 18. Jahrhundert. 4 Bde. Berlin, 1861
- Vaterländische Geschichten. 2 Bde Berlin, 1862
- Neue Stadtgeschichten. 2 Bde. Berlin, 1865
- Ein verlorenes Geschlecht. 6 Bde. Berlin, 1867
- Lorbeer und Cypresse. Literaturbilder. Berlin, 1869 (Darin u. a. über Johann Christian Günther, Moses Mendelssohn, Heinrich von Kleist, Friedrich Hölderlin)
- Götzen und Götter. Roman. 4 Bde. Berlin, 1870
- In der Schweiz. Reisebilder und Novellen. 2 Bde. Leipzig, 1870
- Die Weltgeschichte ist das Weltgericht. Louis Napoleon Bonaparte. Berlin, 1870
- Carl Sand und seine Freunde. Roman aus der Zeit der alten Burschenschaft. 4 Bde. Berlin, 1873
- David Kalisch, der Vater des Kladderadatsch und Begründer der Berliner Lokalposse. Berlin, 1873
- Der Kleinstädter in Berlin. 2 Bde. Berlin, 1873
- Unfehlbar. Zeitroman. 4 Bde. Jena, 1874
- Der große Krach. Roman. 4 Bde. Jena, 1875
- Neue Stadtgeschichten. 3 Bde. Leipzig, 1876
- Das Haus Hillel. Historischer Roman aus der Zeit der Zerstörung Jerusalems. 3 Bde. Berlin, 1879
- Die Frauenverschwörung, zweiaktige Operette, Musik von Gustav Hinrichs, unter Hernahme des Stoffs des Lustspiels von Arthur Müller Die Verschwörung der Frauen oder Die Preußen in Berlin von 1858, 1886
- Berliner Leben. Kulturstudien und Sittenbilder. Leipzig, 1882
- Berliner Kinder. Roman. 3 Bde. Berlin, 1883
- Die deutsche Kaiserstadt Berlin und ihre Umgebung. 2 Bde. Leipzig, 1883–1884
- Die Spiritisten. Erzählung. Berlin, 1885
- Erinnerungen. 2 Bde. Berlin, 1898
