= Berthold Sigismund =

German physician and writer (1819–1864)

Berthold August Richard Sigismund
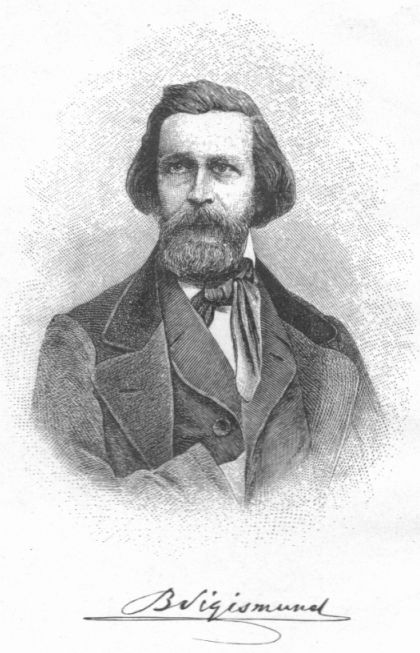
- Born: March 19, 1819; Stadtilm, Thuringia, Germany
- Died: August 13, 1864 (aged 45); Rudolstadt, Thuringia, Germany
- Education: University of Jena, University of Leipzig, University of Würzburg
- Occupations: physician, educator, writer, poet, politician
- Known for: Contributions to natural sciences, education, and literature; Political involvement in the German revolutions of 1848
- Office: Mayor of Blankenburg
- Term: 1845–1850

Berthold August Richard Sigismund (March 19, 1819 – August 13, 1864) was a German medical doctor, educator, writer, poet, and politician.

== Early life and education ==
Berthold August Richard Sigismund was born as the first child of the notary and later judicial councilor Florenz Friedrich Sigismund (1791–1877) in Stadtilm at the foot of the Thuringian Forest. His great-grandfather was a schoolteacher in Schmalenbuche, his grandfather a teacher in Schwarzburg, later in Schmalenbuche, and finally in Blankenburg. His mother was the daughter of the late mayor Fischer in Blankenburg. This marriage produced seven children.

In 1829, the family moved to Blankenburg, where his grandparents lived, for professional reasons. Berthold attended high school in Rudolstadt and learned Hebrew and English on the side. After passing his school-leaving exams in 1837, he decided to study medicine at the University of Jena. There, he discovered his talent for drawing and painting, as well as for music, played the piano, and wrote his first poems. The death of his brother, who had contracted tuberculosis, shortly before Christmas 1839, affected him so deeply that he stayed in Blankenburg throughout the winter. During this time, he met Friedrich Fröbel, who had just established his first kindergarten in Blankenburg, and also attended his lectures. In 1840, he transferred to the University of Leipzig. From 1841 to 1842, he spent his final year of study at the University of Würzburg, where he earned his Doctor of Medicine degree. In Rudolstadt, he passed his medical state exam with honors before the medical examination board.

== Professional career ==
At the age of 23, he settled in his hometown of Blankenburg as a doctor but soon realized that he could not make a living among the impoverished population. Moreover, he began to experience health problems. In July 1843, he traveled through Saalfeld, Sonneberg, Coburg, Bamberg, Nuremberg, and Donauwörth to Augsburg and Munich. From there, he hiked via Zurich to Lenzburg near Aargau, Switzerland, where he worked as a tutor. During his free time, he increasingly devoted himself to scientific and medical literature. The liberal institutions of the Swiss Republic also attracted him. His democratically minded compatriot, Julius Fröbel, who spent some time in Zurich, influenced him.

In September 1844, he took a teaching position at a private school in Worksop near Sheffield, where he mainly taught natural sciences, anthropology, and the German language. At the Mechanics Institute in Derby, he gave a lecture in English on human and animal vocal organs to about 400 listeners. In July 1845, he returned to Thuringia, making a brief stop in Paris, where he furthered his medical knowledge by attending surgery courses at local clinics and hospitals. However, his old stomach ailment troubled him again. Back in Blankenburg, he settled again as a doctor. During this time as a “peasant doctor,” as he once called himself, he wrote poems, later published under the title Asklepias, Pictures from the Life of a Country Doctor.

In the spring of 1845, Sigismund was elected mayor of Blankenburg. For this additional and unfamiliar role, he received an annual salary of 80 gulden. In the revolutionary year of 1848, Sigismund sympathized with patriotic efforts and wished for a united, great, economically, and politically strong Germany. However, when unrest spread in Blankenburg, he opposed it. Like many of his compatriots, he considered emigrating to America, but his love for his homeland kept him from carrying out the plan.

In the summer of 1850, he accepted a teaching position at the high school in Rudolstadt, where he taught natural sciences, mathematics, and English. After just four years, he was awarded the title of professor. In December 1851, he married Pauline Henning from Rudolstadt, and they had two children. During this time, he wrote his books Child and World and The Family as a School of Nature.

As a teacher, he placed special emphasis on not only observing natural objects externally but also delving deeper into their inner workings. Students were encouraged to base their knowledge not on mere authority but on personal observations and reflections. He often hiked with them through the wooded hills and colorful fields of his Thuringian homeland.

At this time, his literary career flourished. He led the Industrial Association in Rudolstadt, worked at a vocational school, and served as a court interpreter. From 1860 onwards, he was a member of the Landtag (parliament). His literary work now focused on his experiences during his hikes in the Thuringian Forest, especially the local nature, the inhabitants, their language, customs, and peculiarities.

Stories from this period were primarily published in the Leipziger Zeitung and Die Gartenlaube. Due to the great interest, he received a commission from the Saxon government to travel through and describe the Ore Mountains, Upper Lusatia, and the Vogtland. In 1859, Dresden offered him a position at the local statistical office, but he declined, primarily for health reasons.

The government of Schwarzburg-Rudolstadt commissioned him to write a detailed description of the principality of Schwarzburg-Rudolstadt. In 1862, the first volume was published, in which he described nature, landscape, population, dialects, customs, economy, state, church, school, and history. The second volume, Local Studies of the Upper Rulership, was published a year later.

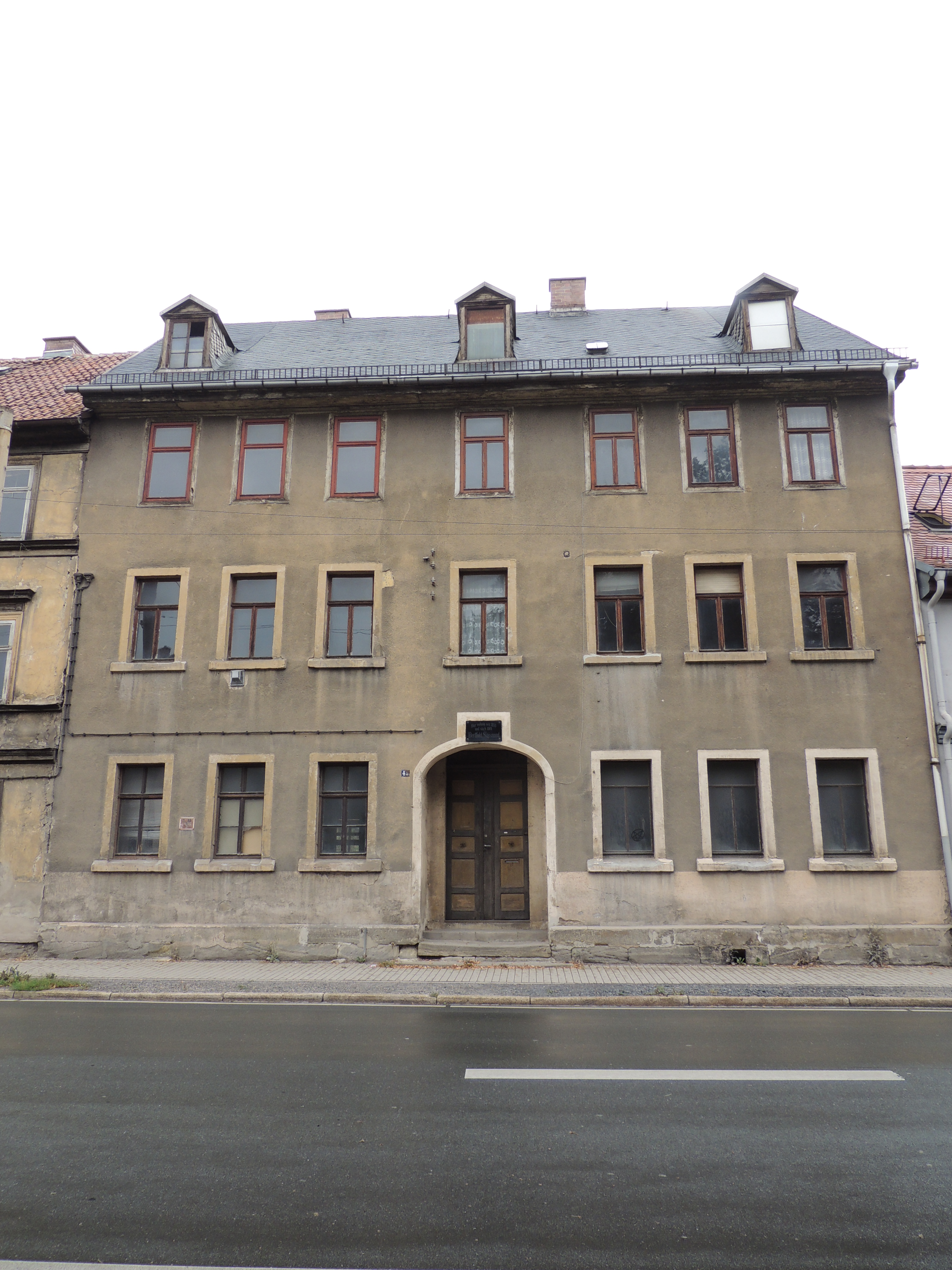
Sigismund's house where he lived and died at Anton-Sommer-Straße 45 in Rudolstadt

== Early death ==
In July 1864, during an excursion in the Thuringian Forest, Berthold Sigismund suffered a severe attack from which he never recovered. On August 13, 1864, at the age of 45, he died in his house in Rudolstadt. On August 31, a memorial service in his honor was held at the Rudolstadt Gymnasium. Three years after his death, a monument was erected in his honor in Rudolstadt: a rock with an inset medallion portrait.

== Notable works ==
- Child and World (Digitized version)
- The Family as a School of Nature
- Songs of a Traveling Student
- Asklepias. Pictures from the Life of a Country Doctor
- Geography of the Principality of Schwarzburg-Rudolstadt
  - Part I: General Geography of the Upper Rulership
  - Part II: Local Geography of the Upper Rulership
