= Henry F. Urban =

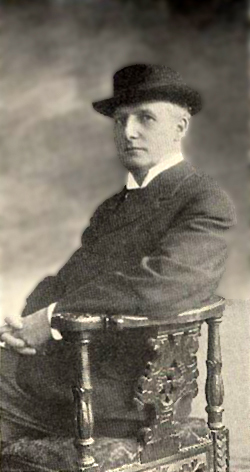
- Portrait photograph of Urban, 1909
- Born: February 13, 1862 Berlin, Kingdom of Prussia
- Died: May 13, 1924 (aged 62) New York City, United States
- Occupation: Journalist, author, playwright

Henry F. Urban (February 13, 1862 – May 13, 1924) was a German American journalist, author, and playwright.

== Biography ==
Reportedly a descendant of Johann Heinrich Voss, Urban was raised in Berlin and emigrated to the United States in 1887. He was naturalized as a U.S. citizen in 1899 in New York. In the following years, he reported on life in America, often in a critical vein, as a freelance correspondent for the newspapers Berliner Tageblatt and Berliner Lokal-Anzeiger as well as for the weekly magazines Jugend and Simplicissimus. His comedy Der Froschkönig, loosely derived from the Brothers Grimm fairy tale "The Frog Prince", was staged at the Irving Place Theatre in 1918. An outspoken critic of the women's suffrage movement, he was primarily known in Germany for a satirical novel about naive German immigrants eager to strike it rich in "Dollarland" America and for collections of his humorous narratives, a number of which have been reissued in the twenty-first century.

== Works ==
- Just Zwölf. Yankee-Schnurren und anderes. Berlin, 1903.
- Die Maus Lula. Tragisches und Tragikomisches. Berlin, 1904.
- Aus dem Dollarlande. Berlin, 1906.
- Lederstrumpfs Erben. Neue Geschichten aus dem Dollarlande. Berlin, 1908.
- Die drei Dollarjäger aus Berlin. Eine heitere New Yorker Geschichte. Berlin, 1910.
- Die Entdeckung Berlins. Berlin, 1911.
- Der Frosch von Seeburg. Berlin, 1911. Coauthor Robert Overweg.
- Der Eisberg und Sonstiges. Berlin, 1912.
- Katzenmüller und andere Erzählungen. Leipzig, 1913.
- Der Nussknacker. Eine Humoreske in drei Aufzügen. Play script. Berlin, 1914.
- Der Froschkönig. Play script, 1918.
- Preface to Drei Mann in einem Boot, vom Hunde ganz zu schweigen by Jerome K. Jerome, trans. A. & M. Springer. Berlin, 1920.
- Ernste und heitere Gedichte. Aus dem Nachlass. Newark, 1920.
- Wie der Berliner ins Seebad fährt. Berlin: Epilogmedia, 2010.
- Die Schwierigkeit, den Grunewald zu entdecken. Berlin: Epilogmedia, 2010.
- Die Kunst, am Sonntag Pfannkuchen zu kaufen. Berlin: Epilogmedia, 2010.
- Die Entdeckung Berlins. Michael Bienert, ed. Berlin: Verlag für Berlin-Brandenburg, 2014. ISBN 978-3-942476-96-6.
- Der Eisberg. Günter Bäbler, ed. Berlin: epubli, 2018. ISBN 978-3-746749-41-9.
