= Wilhelm Klatte =

German music theoretician, pedagogue, journalist and conductor

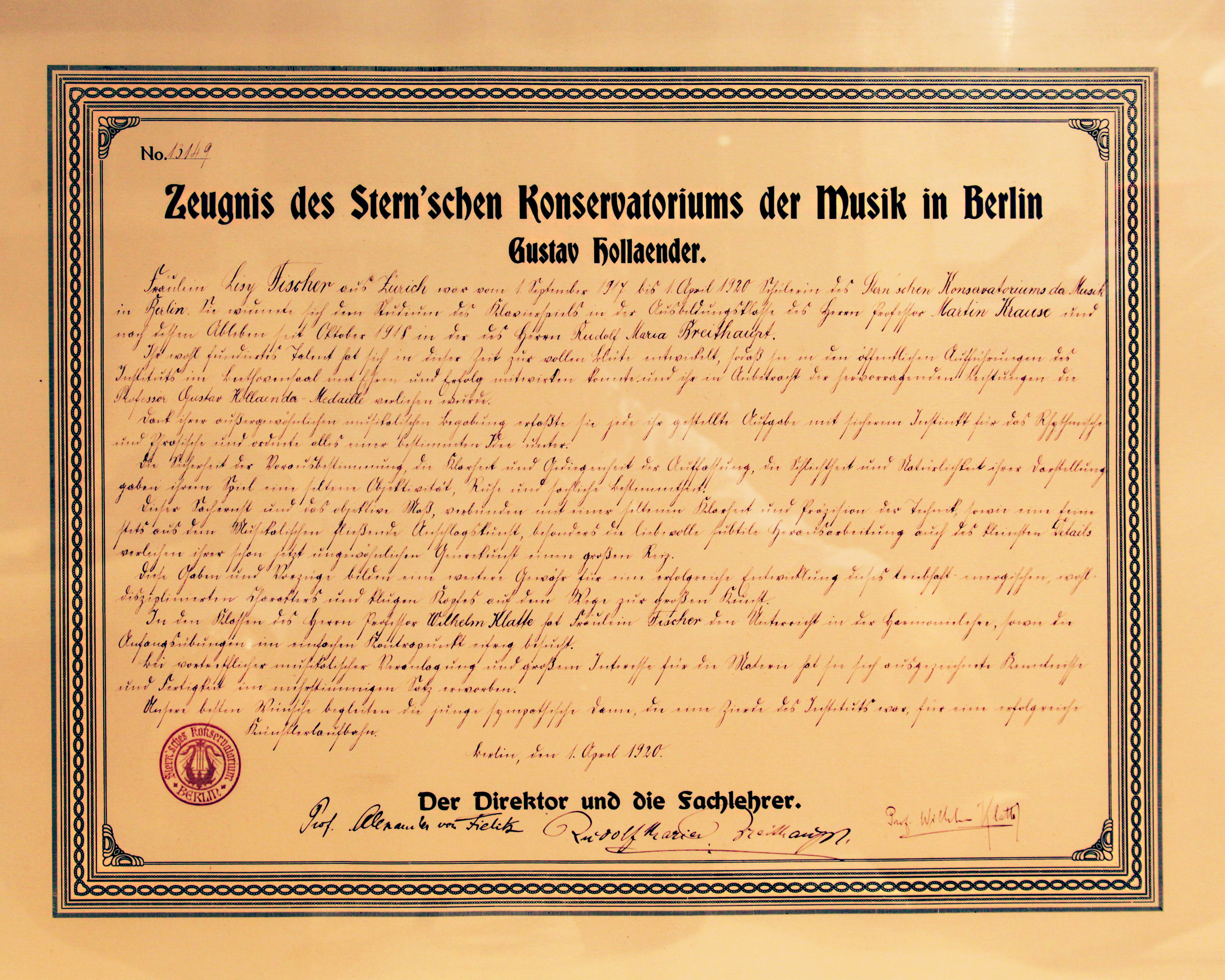
Certificate of the Stern Conservatory from the year 1920 with the signature of Wilhelm Klatte (right)

Wilhelm Klatte (13 February 1870 – 25 July 1930) was a German music theoretician, pedagogue, journalist and conductor.

== Life ==
Born in Bremen, after studying music in Leipzig, Klatte began his professional career as a musician first at the Deutsches Nationaltheater und Staatskapelle Weimar with Richard Strauss. During this time he was also active as a conductor on various occasions. In 1897 he became the first music consultant at the Berliner Lokal-Anzeiger. From 1904 Klatte also taught music theory at the Stern Conservatory in Berlin, where he was appointed professor in 1919. His students there included Else Schmitz-Gohr and Selim Palmgren. Since 1925 he had also held a teaching position for theory at the Royal Music Institute of Berlin.

Klatte also held several honorary posts. He was a member of the board of directors of the Allgemeiner Deutscher Musikverein (from 1909) and representative of the musical arts in the Vorläufiger Reichswirtschaftsrat (from 1925).

Klatte died in Berlin at the age of 60.

== Work ==
- Zur Geschichte der Programm-Musik, 1905
- Franz Schubert, 1907
- Aufgaben für den einfachen Kontrapunkt, 1915
- Grundlagen des mehrstimmigen Satzes (Harmonielehre), 1922
- Das Sternsche Konservatorium der Musik zu Berlin, 1925
