= August Scherl =

German newspaper magnate

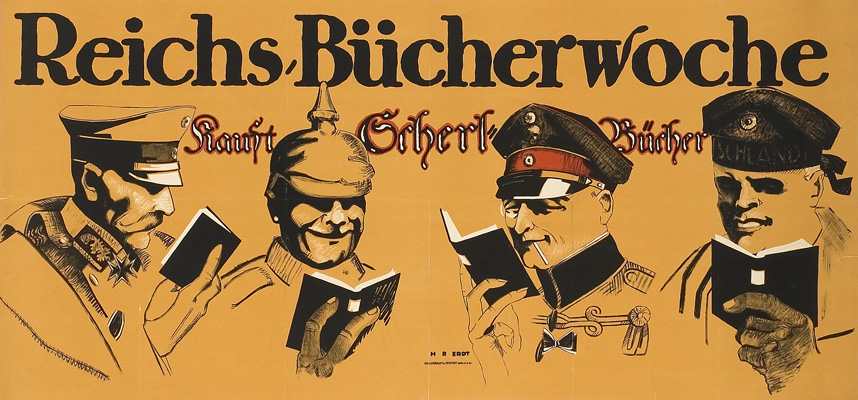
Buy Scherl books!, advertising poster by Hans Rudi Erdt, 1915/16

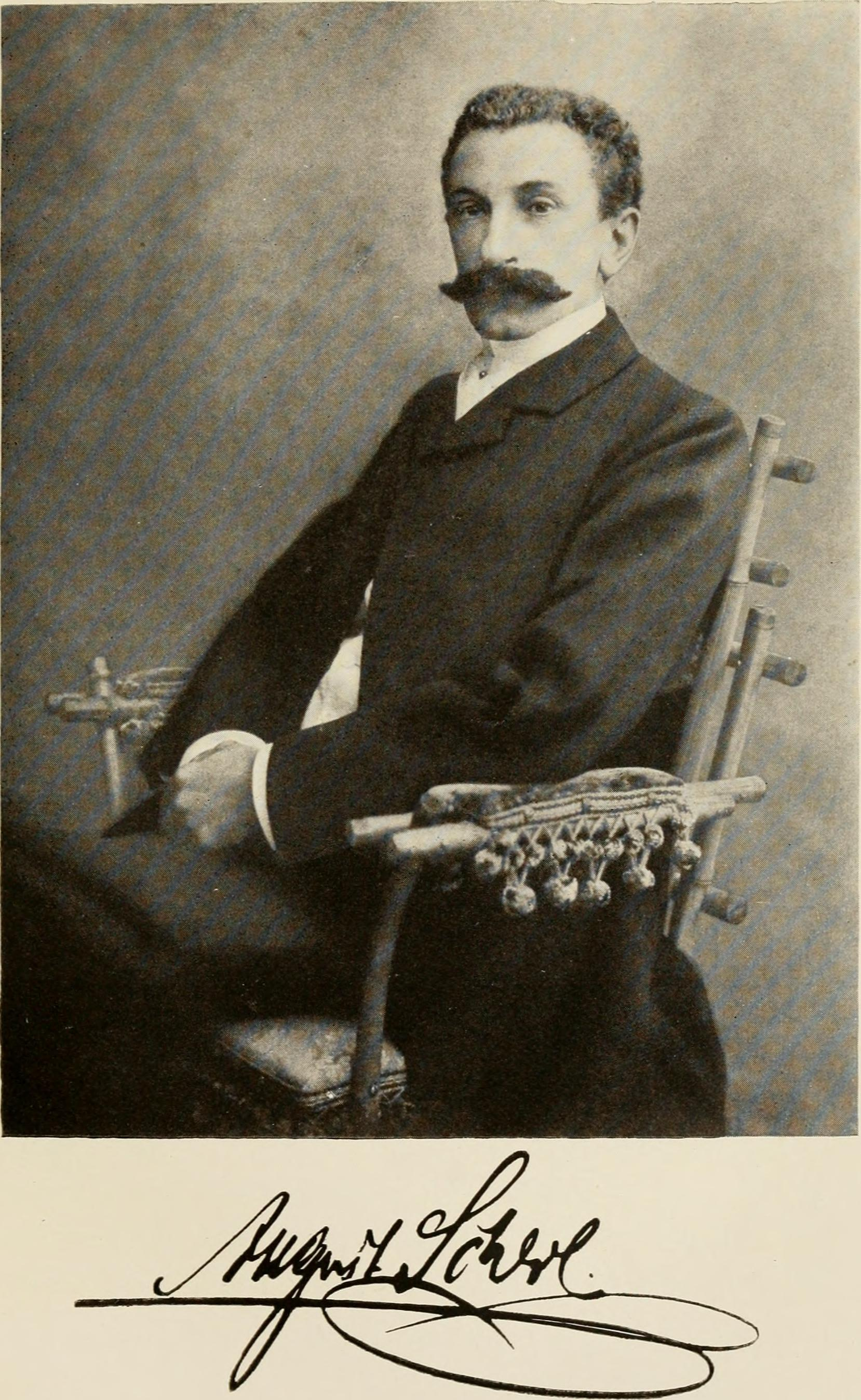
August Scherl

August Scherl (24 July 1849 – 18 April 1921) was a German newspaper magnate.

== Career ==
August Hugo Friedrich Scherl founded a newspaper and publishing concern on 1 October 1883, which from 1900 carried the name Scherl Verlag. He was editor of the Berlin Local Advertiser (Berliner Lokal-Anzeiger) since 3 November 1883, and his publishing house started the weekly magazine Die Woche (The Week) in 1899. In 1904 he took over publication of the widely popular magazine Die Gartenlaube. As a result, his publishing company had the largest circulation of any in Germany at the time.

In 1909 he developed a monorail system for Germany in his book A New Rapid Transit System. His expensive newspaper projects were not economically successful, so in 1913, Scherl informed Chancellor Bethmann-Hollweg that he was going to sell his company's shares. The company was eventually purchased by Simon Alfred Franz Emil von Oppenheim and the Cologne financier Louis Hagen of Deutscher Verlagsverein with financing of 8 million marks. On February 5, 1914, Scherl resigned from the management, selling his shares in the German Publishers Association.

His nationwide newspaper empire was taken over by Alfred Hugenberg in 1916, and later by Max Amann (Franz-Eher-Verlag).

The General-Anzeiger-Presse (General Advertiser Press) in Germany was founded by Scherl.

== Publications by Scherl ==
- 1883: Berliner Lokal-Anzeiger
- 1889: Berliner Abendzeitung
- 1894: Neueste Berliner Handels- und Börsennachrichten
- 1895: Sport im Bild (first German sport illustrated)
- 1898: Berlin has no theater audience! Suggestions for eliminating the abuses in our theater system
- 1899: Die Woche
- 1899: Sport im Wort
- 1900: Der Tag
- 1904: Die Gartenlaube
- 1905: Praktischer Wegweiser, later as Allgemeiner Wegweiser
- 1909: A new rapid transit system - suggestions for improving passenger transport
- 1922: Berlin illustrated night edition
- 1928: Thinking and Guessing
- Der Kinematograph
- Scherl’s Magazin

== Personal life ==
Scherl was born in Düsseldorf. As a boy, he lived with his parents in Naunynstrasse, but in later life he remained in the central district of Berlin. He died in Berlin and is buried at the Luisenstadt cemetery. He had a villa constructed in Dahlem in secret, in order to surprise his wife. When she made a derogatory comment about the building, when driving past it, Scherl had the house demolished, without informing his wife. The secret of his success was his readiness to take risks, understanding of economics, foresight, innovation and unwillingness to take anything on trust.
