= Walter Abendroth =

German composer

Walter Fedor Georg Abendroth (29 May 1896 in Hanover – 30 September 1973 in Fischbachau) was a German composer, editor, and writer on music.

== Life ==
Walter Abendroth was born in the Lower Saxon city of Hanover. The middle child of a land surveyor, he grew up with a younger brother and an older sister in Hanover and, from 1907, in Berlin. He encountered the teachings of Rudolf Steiner as a schoolchild. From that moment on, Anthroposophy, a movement for which he would remain active in many contexts, became a constant companion in his life. From 1914 he studied Painting and Music in Munich; 1916 he was drafted into the military.

After 1918, his "Wanderjahre" took him to Göttingen, where he married in 1920, Jena, Hamburg, Cologne and finally back to Berlin in 1930. Following primarily private musical studies, he became a freelance composer and music critic. Between 1930 and 1934 he took over editing the Allgemeine Musikzeitung, combining this activity with contributions to the Berliner Lokal-Anzeiger.

Following the National Socialists arrival in power, he became a staff music writer at the Berliner Lokal-Anzeiger until 1944. In 1934, he expressed agreement with nationalist socialist cultural policy with regards to the "Neue Musik" (new music), which he described as a "Rotting bacillus, deliberately and calculatedly inoculated into the cultural body [...]" In 1939 he wrote an antisemitic article for the magazine Deutsches Volkstum in which he described the Jewish people's intellectuality as "mere means to the end of exerting power" and "effective method of decomposition, an explosive for splitting the dominated people into powerless classes".

After the war, Abendroth's work was examined by the Allied Control Council during the so-called Denazification processes. He was deemed to be a nationalist anti-Semite rather than a Nazi and as such given 'employable' status.

Abendroth moved to Hamburg with his second wife Hilde, née Schlegl, working as features editor for the national newspaper Die Zeit from 1948 until 1955, when he moved to Munich, working freelance as cultural correspondent. He is noted in particular as biographer (1935) and publisher of the composer, conductor and author Hans Pfitzner's works.

== Artistic Creation ==
In addition to his activities as a music journalist and writer, Abendroth composed five symphonies, as well as a variety of concerts, songs and chamber music. In his compositional work, he endeavoured to develop the traditional forms of music and to combine them with the musical styles of the 20th century.

== Selected compositions ==
Orchestral

- Sinfonietta in drei Sätzen (Sinfonietta in Three Movements) for large orchestra (1924)
- Kleine Orchestermusik (Little Orchestra Music) (1940, with Karl Böhm)
- Erste Symphonie (Symphony No. 1) (1941, with Paul van Kempen)
- Konzert für Orchester (Concerto for Orchestra) (1943)

Concertante

- Konzert für Bratsche und Orchester (Concerto for Viola and Orchestra)

Chamber music

- Divertimento for flute and viola, Op. 5 (1928)
- Sonata No. 1 in G for viola and piano, Op. 21a (1956)
- Sonata No. 2 in C for viola and piano, Op. 21b (1957)

== Books ==
- Hans Pfitzner (1935)
- Deutsche Musik der Zeitwende. Eine kulturphilosophische Persönlichkeitsstudie über Anton Bruckner und Hans Pfitzner (1937)
- Johannes Brahms. Sein Wesen und seine musikgeschichtliche Bedeutung (1939)
- Die Symphonien Anton Bruckners. Einführungen (1940)
- Hans Pfitzner. Sein Leben in Bildern (1941)
- Vom Werden und Vergehen der Musik (1949)
- Vier Meister der Musik. Bruckner, Mahler, Reger, Pfitzner (1952)
- (Hg.:) Hans Pfitzner. Reden, Schriften, Briefe. Unveröffentlichtes und bisher Verstreutes (1955)
- Bruckner. Eine Bildbiographie (1958)
- Kleine Geschichte der Musik (1959)
  - neubearbeitet als: Kurze Geschichte der Musik (1969)
- Selbstmord der Musik? Zur Theorie, Ideologie und Phraseologie des modernen Schaffens (1963)
- Ich warne Neugierige. Erinnerungen eines kritischen Zeitbetrachters (1966)
- Arthur Schopenhauer, (1967)
- Rudolf Steiner und die heutige Welt. Ein Beitrag zur Diskussion um die menschliche Zukunft (1969)
- Reinkarnation (1986)
