= Theodor Mügge =

German writer

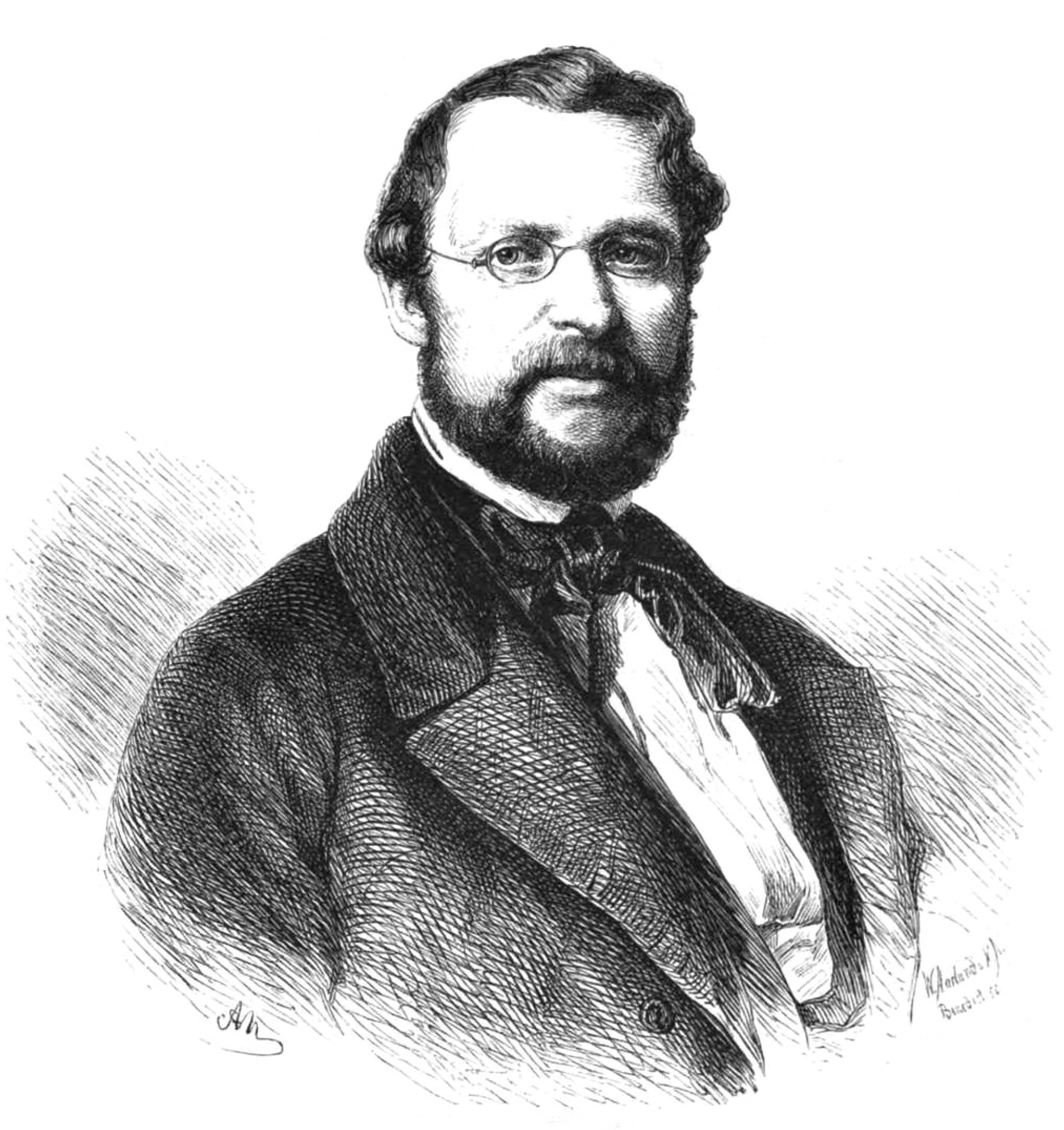
- Portrait from Die Gartenlaube of 1861
- Born: November 8, 1802; Berlin
- Died: February 18, 1861 (aged 58)
- Occupations: Author and activist

Theodor Mügge (8 November 1802 – 18 February 1861) was a German author and liberal activist.

== Biography ==
Theodor Mügge was born and educated in Berlin. His liberal sentiments, expressed in various newspapers and in such pamphlets as Die Censurverhältnisse in Preussen (The censorship conditions in Prussia) (1845), led to several arrests and prosecutions.

During the 20 years preceding his death in 1861, Mügge wrote numerous sketches, tales, novels, and romances, which appeared in a complete edition in 1862–67 (33 vols.). Several works, including Toussaint (1840) and Afraja (1854), have been translated into English.

Notable are Mügge's Norwegian romances and sketches of travel: Leben and Lieben in Norwegen ("Life and love in Norway," 1858); Skizzen aus dem Norden ("Sketches from the North," 1844); and Nordisches Bilderbuch ("Nordic picture album," 1858; 3d ed. 1862).
