= Die Woche =

German illustrated weekly newspaper

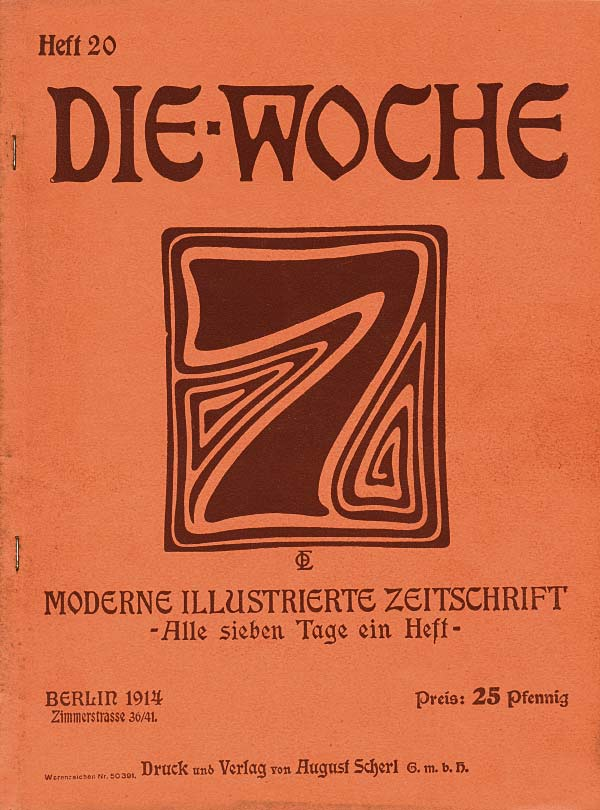
- Front page of issue 20, 1914
- Type: illustrated weekly newspaper
- Publisher: August Scherl Verlag
- Founded: 1899
- Ceased publication: 1944
- Language: German
- Headquarters: Berlin
- Price: 40 Pf. (1930s/40s)

Die Woche ([dɪ ˈvɔxə], 'The Week') was an illustrated weekly newspaper published in Berlin from 1899 to 1944.

== Overview ==
Die Woche reported on popular entertainment, including "sensationalist crime stories", and covered celebrities in sports and show business. Its publisher was newspaper magnate August Scherl, who also owned the Berliner Lokal-Anzeiger, a Berlin paper.

By 1916, Scherl had been bought out by the (politically conservative) Hugenberg Press, and Die Woche came to play a part in the politics of the day, specifically in promoting an image of Paul von Hindenburg as both a military man and a civilian, aiding his appeal across the German population.

A Turkish weekly magazine, Yedigün, was inspired by Die Woche. Between 1993 and 2002, the title Die Woche was used for a completely different kind of weekly newspaper.

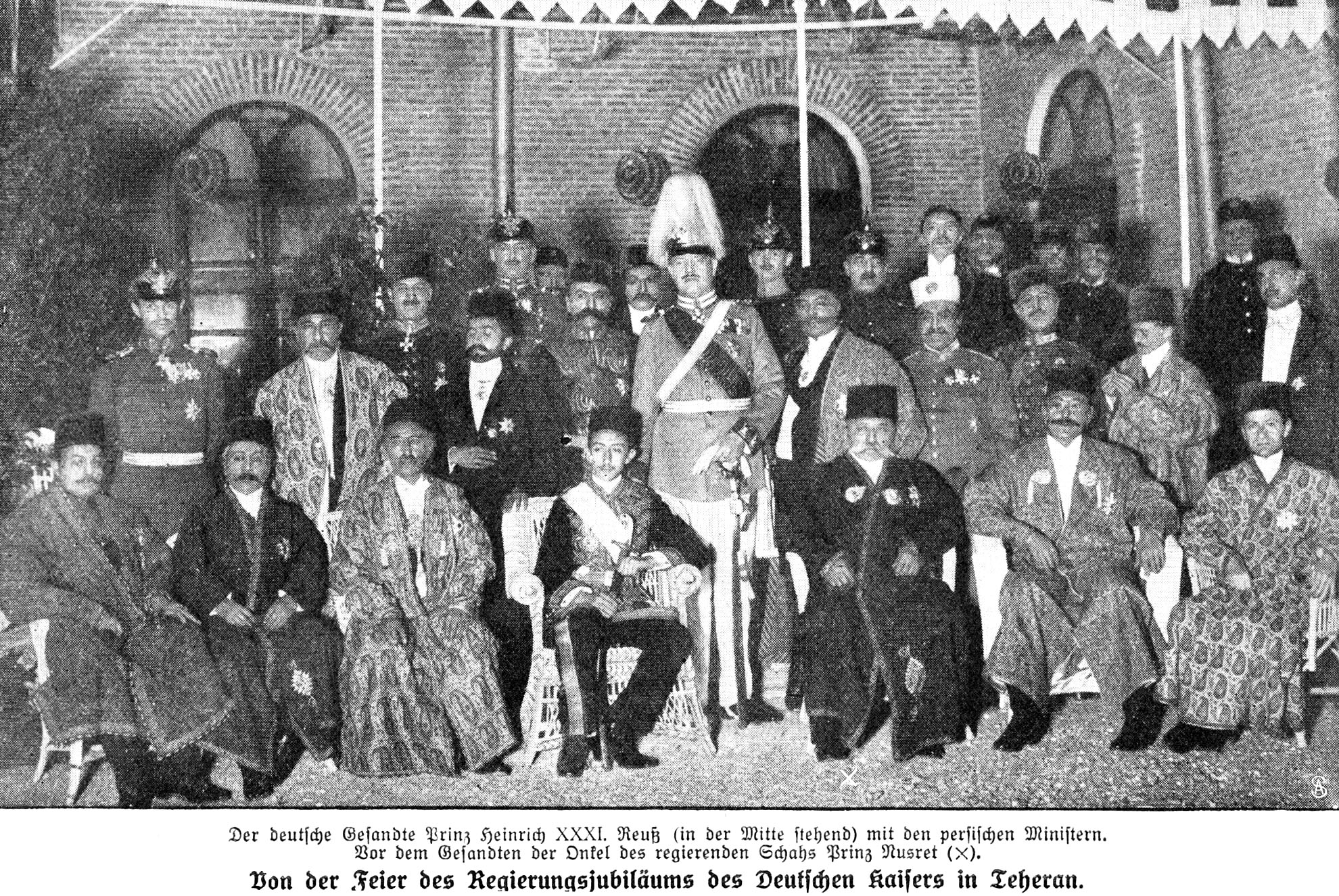
The German ambassador in Tehran, 1913, from Die Woche

== Bibliography ==
- Dahrendorf, Ralf (2000). Liberal und unabhängig. Gerd Bucerius und seine Zeit (in German) (2nd ed.). Munich: C. H. Beck. ISBN 9783406464744.
