= E. Marlitt =

German novelist (1825–1887)

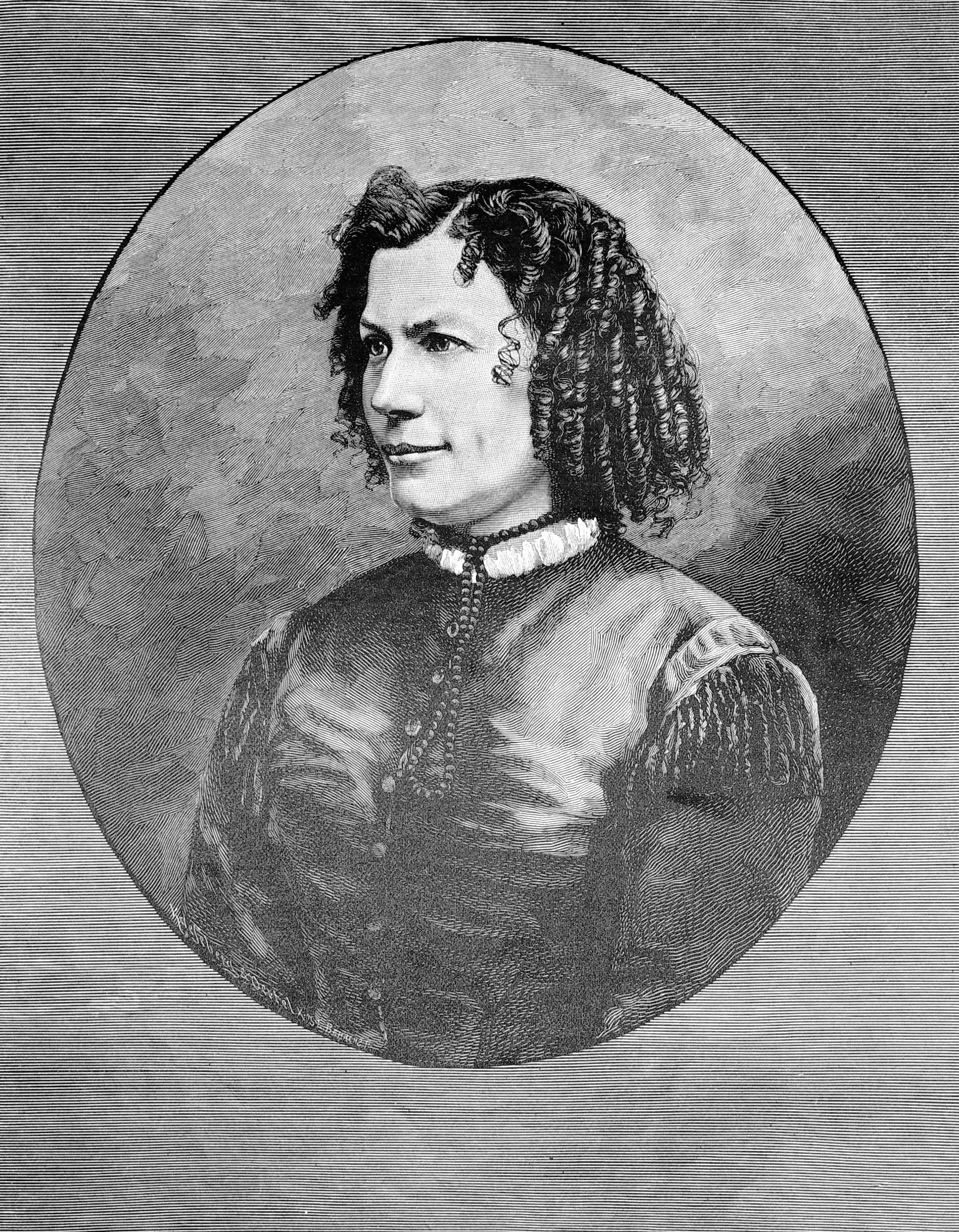
E. Marlitt

E. Marlitt is the pseudonym of Eugenie John (December 5, 1825 – June 22, 1887), a popular German novelist.

== Biography ==
She was born at Arnstadt. Her father was a portrait painter; her patroness was the Princess of Schwarzburg-Sondershausen, who adopted her in 1841 and sent her to Vienna to study music for three years on account of her fine voice.

She became deaf, and returned to Sondershausen, living for 11 years at court as a companion to her patroness. Her correspondents were struck with her attractive style, and encouraged her to write novels. For this purpose, she returned to Arnstadt in 1863, and there began her career as a novelist. She used her experiences at court and as a traveling companion to the princess as material for her books, which were primarily directed against social prejudice and hypocrisy.

== Works ==
- Die zwölf Apostel (1865) This is her first novel. It appeared in the Leipzig Gartenlaube.
- Goldelse (1866) This novel marked the beginning of her celebrity, its readers attracted by its graphic and poetic delineations of German life.
- Blaubart (1866)
- Das Geheimnis der alten Mamsell (1868)
- Thüringer Erzählungen (1869)
- Reichsgräfin Gisela (1870)
- Heideprinzeßchen (1872)
- Die zweite Frau (1874)

These novels were made available in English translations by Annis Lee Wister of Philadelphia. Marlitt's collected works appeared in 10 volumes (Leipzig, 1888–90; second edition, 1891–94).

Marlitt published several works in the German weekly magazine Die Gartenlaube (such as Reichsgräfin Gisela in 1869).

== Selected filmography ==
- Das Geheimnis der alten Mamsell (1917)
- Im Hause des Kommerzienrates (1917)
- Die Frau mit den Karfunkelsteinen (1917)
- Die zweite Frau (1918)
- Old Mamsell's Secret (1925)
- El secreto de la solterona (Mexico, 1945)
- Old Mamsell's Secret (1972, TV film)
- Im Schillingshof (1973, TV film)
- Im Hause des Kommerzienrates (1975, TV film)
- Die zweite Frau (1983, TV film)
- Die Frau mit den Karfunkelsteinen (1985, TV film)
