= Gartenlaube Waltz =

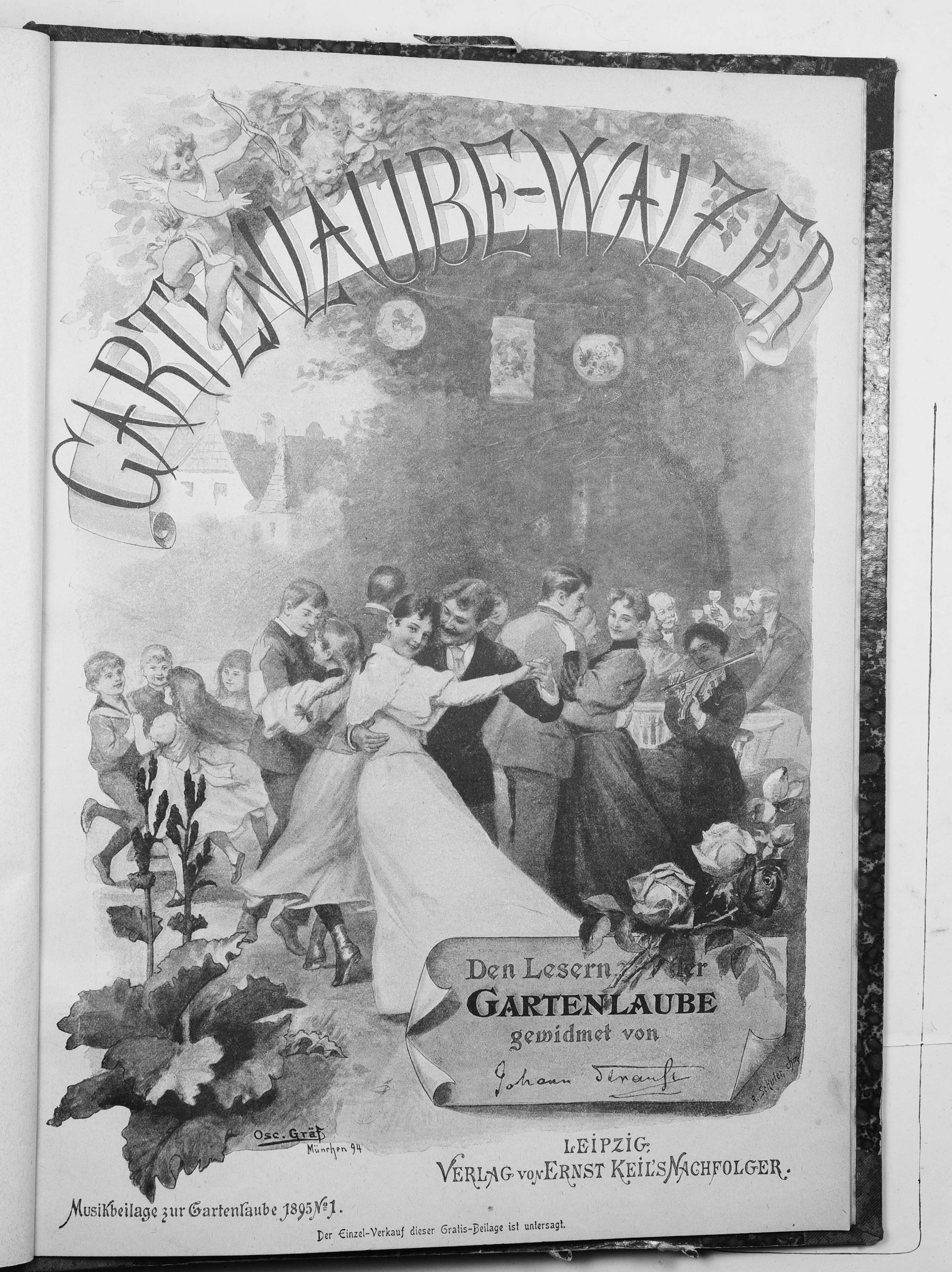
"Gartenlaube Waltz" cover, in Die Gartenlaube magazine, 1895, signed by the composer

"Gartenlaube Waltz", Op. 461, German: "Gartenlaube-Walzer" (Arbor waltz), is a waltz by the Austrian composer Johann Strauss II. The waltz was dedicated to readers of the magazine Die Gartenlaube, a German weekly for the middle class, which became the most-read magazine in 1890s Germany.

It was first performed in the Golden Hall of the Vienna Musikverein on 6 January 1895, conducted by the composer and in the presence of the composers Karl Goldmark, Johannes Brahms and Richard Heuberger. It was so successful that the enthusiastic applause demanded an immediate encore. It was played again a week later in a concert by Eduard Strauss who introduced it to London audiences in his concerts at the Imperial Institute in Kensington, starting on 11 May 1896. In a Royal Command Performance for Queen Victoria on 30 May 1895 in Buckingham Palace, it was played under the title "Garden-Bower Waltz".

== Composition notes ==
The work begins with an extended introduction in the key of E-flat with a tempo direction of Allegretto ben moderato (a little fast with moderation), in 6/8 time, but with 2 distinct beats, and changes briefly into 2/4 time, then back to 6/8. Then begins the first principal waltz melody, marked Tempo di Valse (typical waltz tempo), in simple waltz time, 3/4. A performance takes about twelve minutes.

The "Gartenlaube Waltz" is scored for orchestra. However, Johann Strauss also wrote a piano version of the waltz.
