= Die Gartenlaube =

German magazine (1853–1944)

Die Gartenlaube Illustriertes Familienblatt
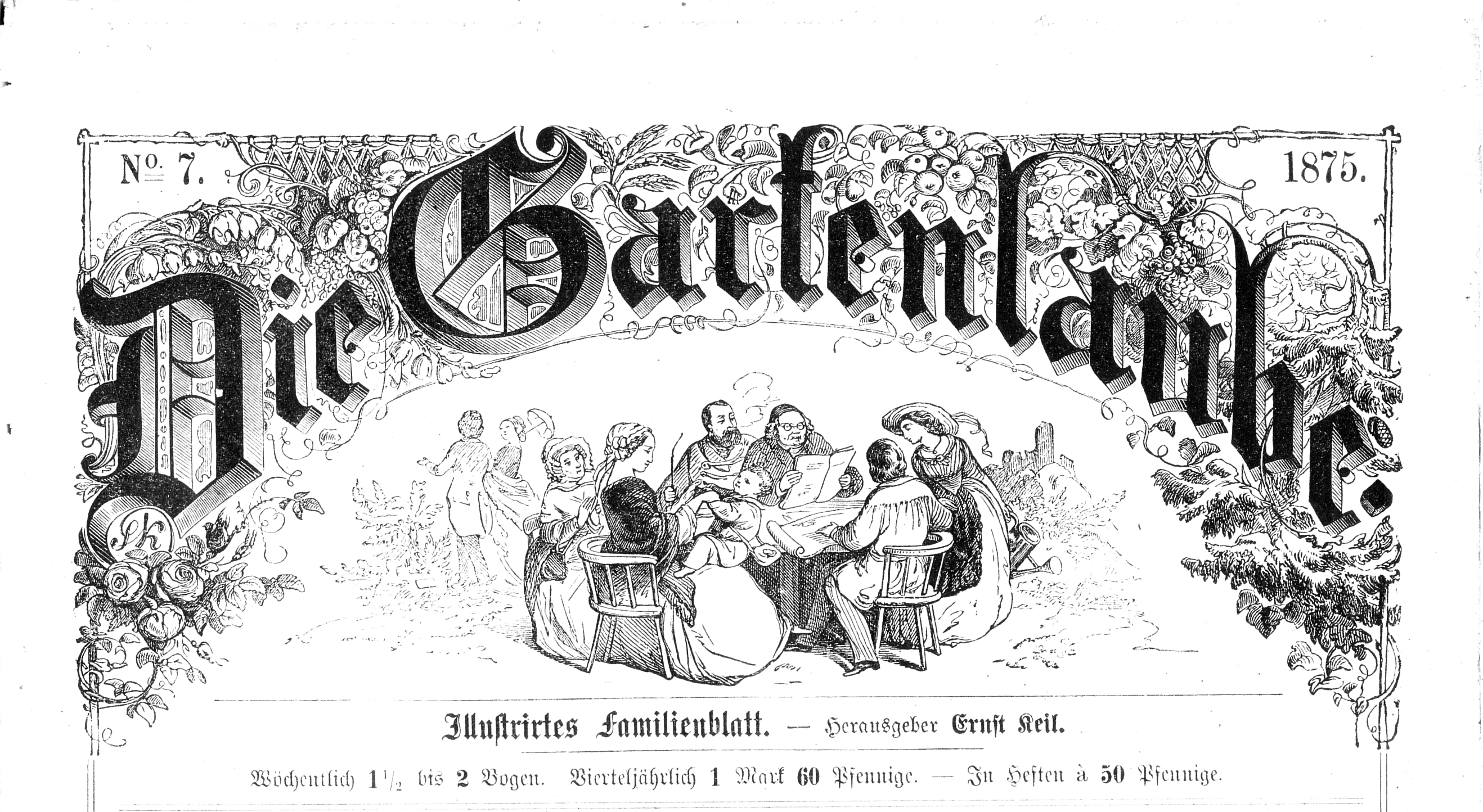
- Editor: Editors-in-Chief Ferdinand Stolle (1853–1862); Ernst Keil (1862–1878); Ernst Ziel (1878–1883); Friedrich Hofmann (1883–1886); Adolf Kröner (1886–1903)
- Categories: Weekly journal
- Format: Quarto (242mm x 305mm)
- Publisher: Publishers Ernst Keil (1853–1878); Adolf Kröner (1884–1903); Alfred Kröner (1886–1903); August Scherl (1904–1916); Alfred Hugenberg (1916–1938); Max Amann (1938–1944)
- Paid circulation: 382,000
- Total circulation: min est. 2,000,000 max est. 5,000,000 (1878)
- Founder: Ernst Keil
- Founded: 1853
- Final issue: 1944
- Company: Keil-Verlag (1853–1884); Kröner-Verlag (1884–1904); Scherl-Verlag (1904–1938); Eher-Verlag (1938–1944)
- Country: Germany
- Based in: Leipzig (1853–1937); Berlin (1938–1944)
- Language: German

Die Gartenlaube – Illustrirtes Familienblatt [sic] (Note: After 1890, the spelling of the subtitle was modernized to Illustriertes Familienblatt, as seen in Die Gartenlaube Title Page 1/1890. Upon purchase in 1938 by Eher Verlag, the magazine's name was changed to Die neue Gartenlaube.) (German: [diː ˈɡaʁtn̩ˌlaʊbə]; lit. 'The Garden Arbor – Illustrated Family Journal') was the first successful mass-circulation German newspaper and a forerunner of all modern magazines. It was founded by publisher Ernst Keil and editor Ferdinand Stolle in Leipzig, Kingdom of Saxony, in 1853. Their objective was to reach and enlighten the whole family, especially in the German middle classes, with a mixture of current events, essays on the natural sciences, biographical sketches, short stories, poetry, and full-page illustrations.

At the height of its popularity Die Gartenlaube was widely read across the German-speaking world. It could be found in all German states, the German colonies in Africa and among the significant German-speaking minorities of Latin America, such as Brazil. Austrian composer Johann Strauss II even published a waltz dedicated to its readers, with the English title "Gartenlaube Waltz", in 1895.

During its 91-year history the journal changed owners several times. By the turn of the century it had become more focused on entertainment, and in the buildup to World War I it came under the control of right-wing nationalists with Alfred Hugenberg since 1916. These changes corresponded to a decline in its readership. It was finally purchased outright by the Nazi publishing house Eher Verlag in 1938, who renamed it Die neue Gartenlaube, and ceased publication in 1944. Despite this, today Die Gartenlaube remains important for comprehensive historical analysis in many fields and is regarded as an essential source for the understanding of German cultural history.

== Circulation and format ==
Circulation of Die Gartenlaube increased steadily following its initial 1853 print run of 5,000 copies, reaching 60,000 by the end of its fourth year. After the magazine introduced serialized novels, its paid circulation increased dramatically, rising to 160,000 by 1863 and 382,000 by 1875. By comparison, most daily newspapers of the period had a circulation of only 4,000 copies. Since Die Gartenlaube became common family reading and many lending libraries and cafes took delivery, estimates of actual readership run between two and five million. It kept this market supremacy until at least 1887 and at one time it claimed to have the largest readership of any publication in the world.

The format of the magazine consisted of 52 weekly issues, 16–20 pages each, in quarto size (242mm x 305mm). The text, printed in a Fraktur (alt Deutsch) font, was typeset with elaborate engraved illustrations and, later, with some photographs. Die Gartenlaube's masthead depicted a grandfatherly figure reading aloud to a family around a table. Between 1853 and 1880 works by prominent German writers such as Goethe and Schiller dominated its pages. Goethe was featured 75 times in print and 14 times in illustrations, and Schiller was featured 90 times in print and 15 times in illustrations. Publication of works by novelist E. Marlitt in serial form, such as Goldelse beginning in 1866, had a significant impact on the magazine's popularity and on Marlitt's celebrity. A particularly famous image by Willy Stöwer of the sinking of the RMS Titanic was published by the magazine in 1912.

== Editorial stages ==
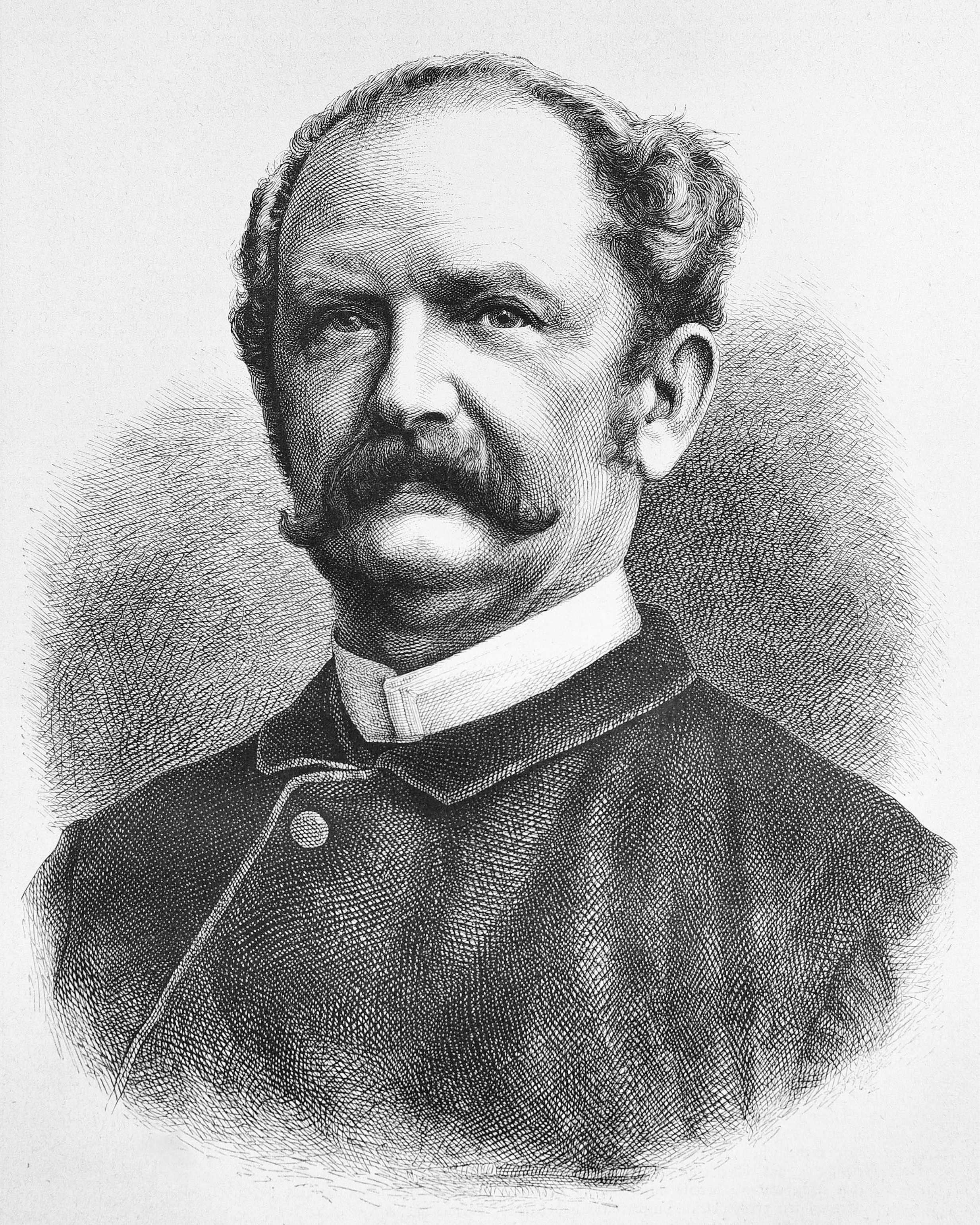
Ernst Keil, founder of the magazine

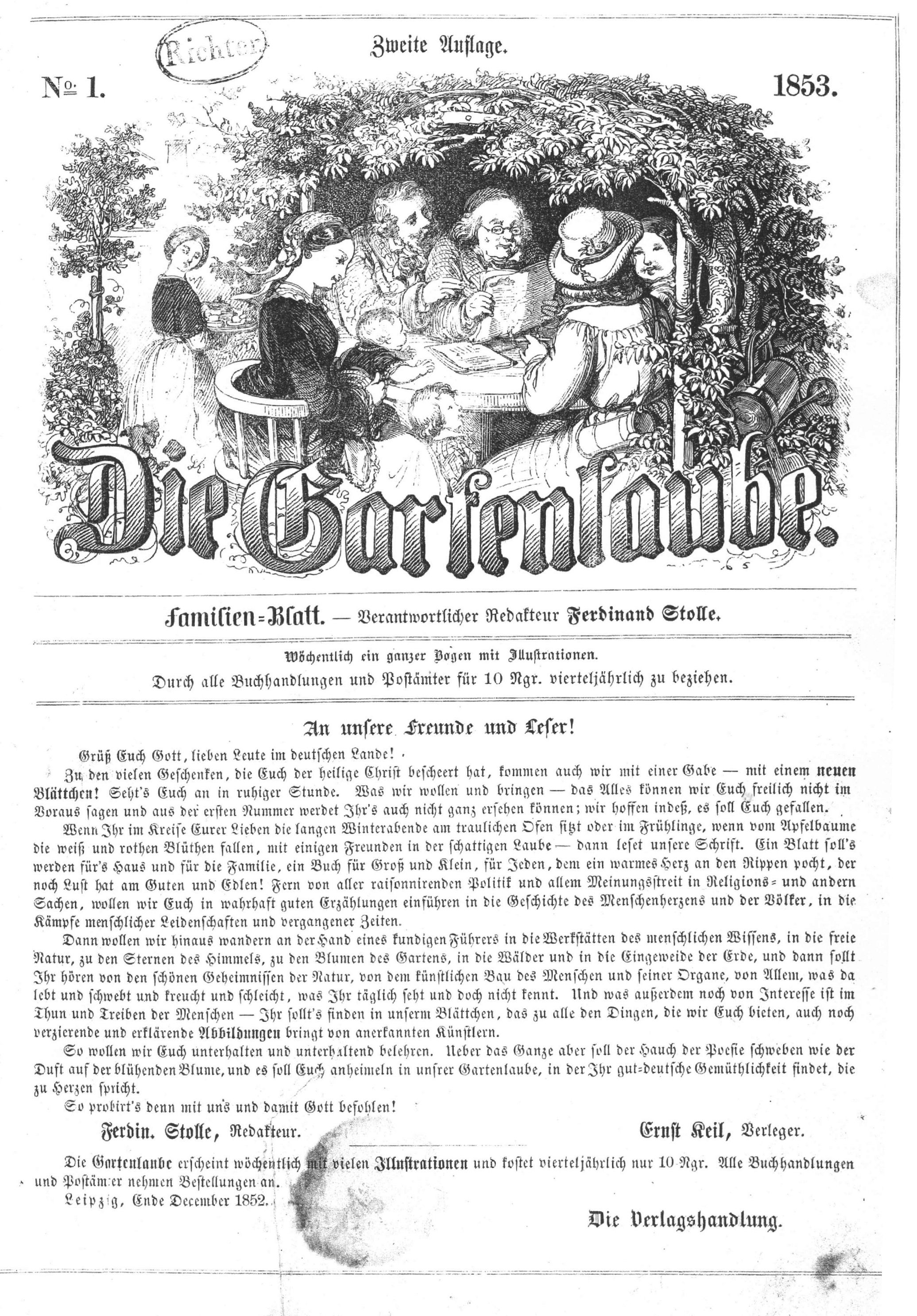
Volume 1 No. 1, 1853

Die Gartenlaube went through a number of distinct phases throughout its history.

=== Founding ===
The early volumes up to German unification in 1871 were envisioned to be a "people's encyclopedia", covering a wide range of interests. Founded by radical liberal publisher Ernst Keil, it was committed to the creation of a national democratic unity government and an enlightened population. The promotion of bourgeois values contrasted with the decline of aristocratic norms. During this period Die Gartenlaube was also noted for a neutral to positive view of Jews, with occasional articles on Jewish family life. In the years following the founding of the German Empire in 1871, Die Gartenlaube became increasingly antisemitic, publishing among other things Otto Glagau's violent attacks on "the Jews" from 1874 to 1876. The weekly was also seen as a defender of Prussian policy. Their dedicated and highly polemical interest in the culture war (proclaimed by Pope Pius IX in his "Dogma of Infallibility" in 1870), came to the defense of the liberal world view. Arguments in support of the National Liberal Party were supported in particular. When Ernst Keil died in 1878 the magazine had reached the height of its success and influence, with a paid circulation of 372,000. Its actual readership was at least 2 million, making it one of the most widely read publications in the world.

=== Kröner Verlag ===
In 1886, Keil's widow sold Die Gartenlaube to new publisher Adolf Kröner and his son Alfred. As co-owner/editors, under their guidance the paper changed dramatically in scope and content. Die Gartenlaube became increasingly conservative and political or religious issues were no longer covered. The topics of divorce and suicide were entirely taboo after this repositioning. Instead of a popular encyclopedia meant to enlighten and educate, by the turn of the century Die Gartenlaube was primarily an entertainment paper.

=== Scherl Verlag ===
In 1904, Die Gartenlaube was purchased by entrepreneur and right-wing nationalist August Scherl and the tone of the newspaper became increasingly political. In the run up to World War I, one article stated that the coming war was to be "the happy, great hour of struggle", not only because of German technological advances but because it would be "more beautiful and more magnificent to live forever on the plaque of heroes than to die a hollow death without name in a bed". By buying up numerous other publishers, Scherl's company "Scherl-Verlag" had the largest circulation in Germany. However, his various costly business projects were not economically successful, so he sold the company to the "German Publishers Society" in 1914 and retired.

=== Hugenberg and Eher Verlag ===
In 1916 the Scherl-Verlag publishing house was acquired by industrialist Alfred Hugenberg. During the interwar period, Hugenberg used his new media empire to help Adolf Hitler become Chancellor of Germany, hoping to use Hitler as a "tool". Hugenberg instead became increasingly isolated and had little influence in the Third Reich. These changes, as well as Die Gartenlaube's expressly antisemitic articles, resulted in readership declines. Attempts to stem the loss by merging it with similar weeklies had little effect. The largest part of Hugenberg's press group were finally purchased by the Nazi publishing house Eher-Verlag, where the journal was renamed Die neue Gartenlaube ("The New Garden Arbor") in 1938. A much-diminished Gartenlaube struggled on, finally folding in 1944.

== List of major contributors ==
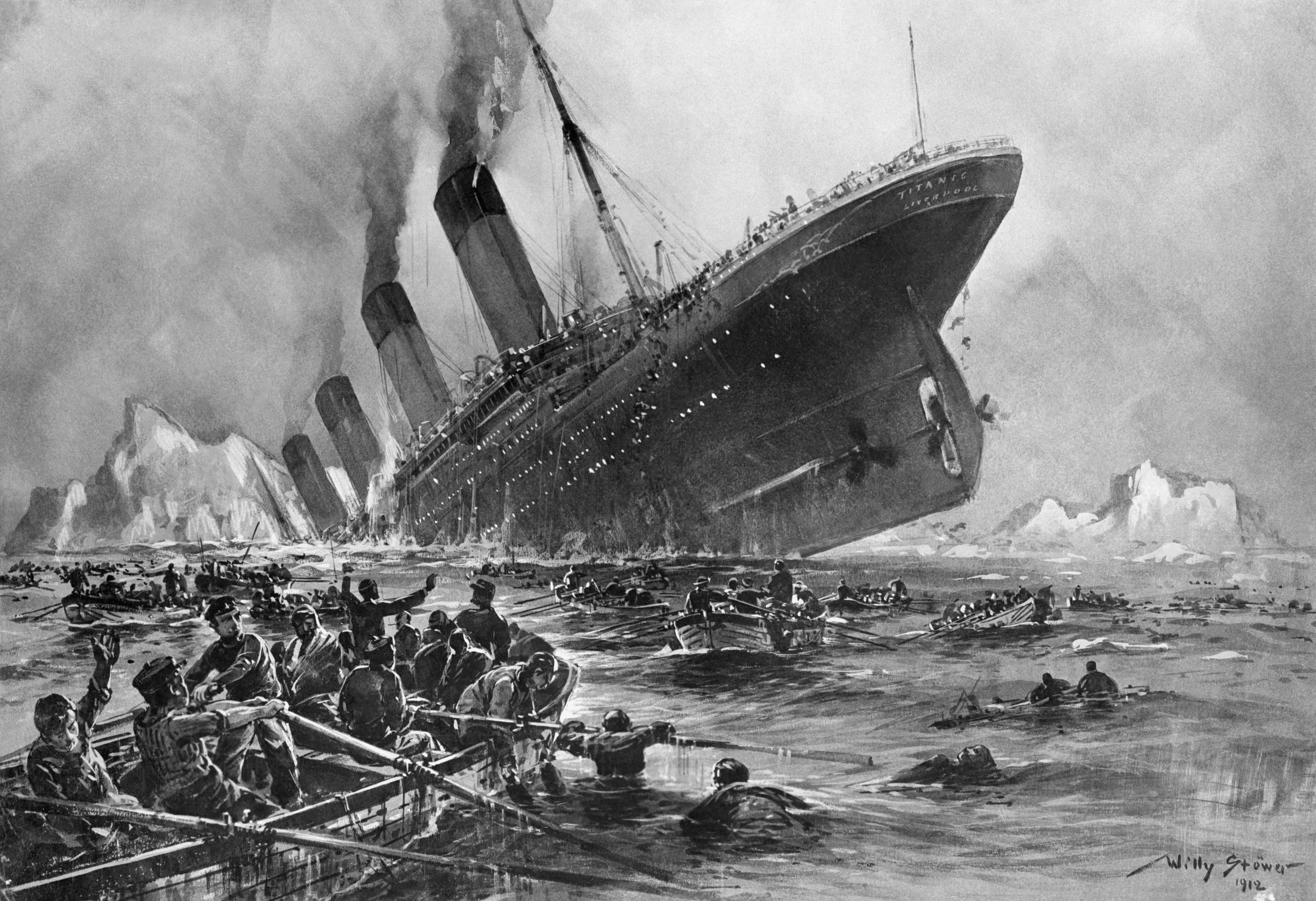
Der Untergang der "Titanic‟, 2-page layout by Willy Stöwer, 1912

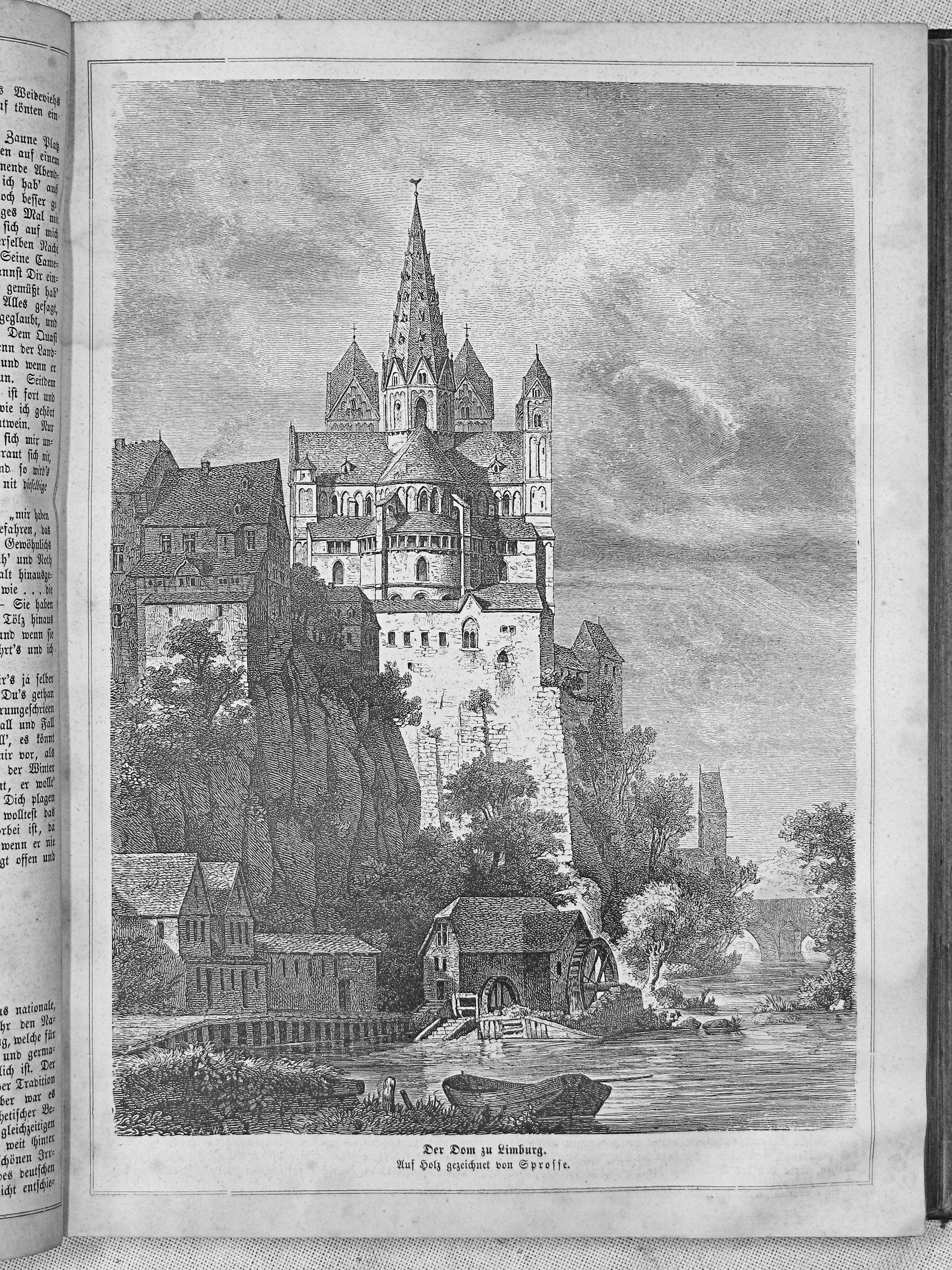
Cathedral of Limburg: a typical full-page drawing, copied from earlier artwork, in 1863.

- Christian Wilhelm Allers (1857–1915), illustrator
- Alfred Edmund Brehm (1829–1884), zoologist and writer (Brehms Tierleben)
- Elisabeth Bürstenbinder (1838–1918), writer
- Rudolf Cronau (1855–1939), journalist and painter
- Otto Dammer (1839–1916), chemist and writer
- Rudolf Doehn (1821–1894), politician and writer
- Fedor Flinzer (1832–1911), writer and illustrator
- Theodor Fontane (1819–1898), writer
- Ludwig Ganghofer (1855–1920), writer
- Carl Grote (1839–1907), illustrator
- Karl Gutzkow (1811–1878), writer
- Edmund Harburger (1846–1906), illustrator
- Jakob Christoph Heer (1859–1925), Swiss writer and editor
- Wilhelmine Heimburg (1848–1912), writer
- Georg Hiltl (1826–1878), actor and writer
- Georg Hirth (1841–1916), journalist, later publisher in Munich
- Friedrich Hofmann (1813–1888), permanent employee, 1883–1886 Editor in Chief
- Carl Karlweis (1850–1901), columnist
- Kaspar Kögler (1838–1923), illustrator, poet
- Herbert König (1820–1876), illustrator
- Eugenie Marlitt (1825–1887), writer
- Charlotte Niese (1854–1935), Holsteinische poet
- August Peters (1817–1864), writer
- Max Ring (1817–1901), doctor and writer
- Anna Ritter (1865–1921), poet
- Friedrich Emil Rittershaus (1834–1897), poet
- August Scherl (1849–1921), publisher
- Carl Ludwig Schleich (1859–1922), doctor
- Eduard Schmidt-Weißenfels (1833–1893), politician and writer
- Levin Schücking (1814–1883), writer
- Berthold Sigismund (1819–1864), doctor, professor, politician and writer
- Ludwig Storch (1803–1881), writer
- Willy Stöwer (1864–1931), illustrator
- Moritz Wiggers (1816–1894), politician and judge

== Literature ==
- Alfred Estermann: Inhaltsanalytische Bibliographien deutscher Kulturzeitschriften des 19. Jahrhunderts. Vol. 3, "Die Gartenlaube (1853–1880 [–1944])". (München: Saur, 1995)
- Heidemarie Gruppe: "Volk“ zwischen Politik und Idylle in der "Gartenlaube“ 1853–1914. Lang, Frankfurt/M. 1976 (Europäische Hochschulschriften/19; Vol. 11), ISBN 3-261-01939-5
- Fayçal; Hamouda, eds. (2005), Der Verleger Ernst Keil und seine Gartenlaube (in German), Leipzig: Edition Marlitt, ISBN 3-938824-03-4
- Undine Janeck (2003), Zwischen Gartenlaube und Karl May. Deutsche Amerikarezeption in den Jahren 1871–1913 (in German), Aachen: Shaker Verlag, ISBN 3-8322-1494-1
- Marcus Koch: "Nationale Identität im Prozess nationalstaatlicher Orientierung, dargestellt am Beispiel Deutschlands durch die Analyse der Familienzeitschrift "Die Gartenlaube" von 1853–1890". Lang, Frankfurt/M. 2003 (Europäische Hochschulschriften/22; Vol. 389), ISBN 3-631-51423-9
- Matthias Leupold: Künstlerische Bildfolge zum Ideologiegehalt des vielgelesenen Blattes "Leupolds Gartenlaube–Liebhaberaufnahmen in Erinnerung an ein deutsches Familienblatt 1994". In Die Vergangenheit hat erst begonnen (Köln: Schaden Verlag, 2004) ISBN 3-932187-28-8
- Heide Radeck (1967), "Zur Geschichte von Roman und Erzählung in der "Gartenlaube" 1853 bis 1914. Heroismus und Idylle als Instrument nationaler Ideologie" (Dissertation) (in German), Universität Erlangen
- Anne-Susanne Rischke: "Die Lyrik in der "Gartenlaube“ 1853–1903. Untersuchungen zu Thematik, Form und Funktion". Lang, Frankfurt/M. 1982 (Europäische Hochschulschriften/1; Vol. 516), ISBN 3-8204-6258-9.
- Hermann Zang (1935), Die "Gartenlaube" als politisches Organ. Belletristik, Bilderwerk und literarische Kritik im Dienste der liberalen Politik 1860–1880 (in German), Coburg: Roßteuscher
- "Sächsische Keilschrift", article about Die Gartenlaube in Der Spiegel, issue 16 / 1963, 17 April 1963, p. 67
