= Elisabeth Bürstenbinder =

German writer (1838-1918)

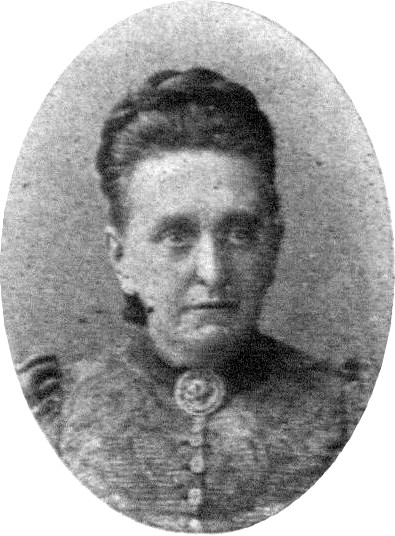
Elisabeth Bürstenbinder

Elisabeth Bürstenbinder (pen name, Ernst Werner; 25 November 1838, in Berlin – 10 October 1918, in Merano) was a German writer who wrote under the name Ernst Werner. She first gained attention in 1870 with Hermann. Among her works Sacred Vows, Fickle Fortune, Riven Bonds, and some others had English translations.

== Bibliography ==
=== Novels ===
- Am Altar, Leipzig 1873
- Glück auf!, Leipzig 1874
- Gesprengte Fesseln, Leipzig 1875
- Vineta, Leipzig 1877
- Um hohen Preis, Leipzig 1878
- Frühlingsboten, Leipzig 1880
- Der Egoist, Leipzig 1882
- Gebannt und erlöst, Leipzig 1884
- Ein Gottesurteil, Leipzig 1885
- Heimatklang, Leipzig 1887
- Sankt Michael, Leipzig 1887
- Die Alpenfee, Leipzig 1889
- Flammenzeichen, Leipzig 1890
- Freie Bahn!, Leipzig 1893
- Fata Morgana, Leipzig 1896
- Hexengold, Leipzig 1900
- Runen, 1903
- Siegwart, 1909

=== Novellas ===
- Gartenlaubenblüten, Leipzig 1872
- Die Blume des Glücks, Leipzig 1885
- Adlerflug, Berlin 1886
