= Moritz Wiggers =

German lawyer (1816–1894)

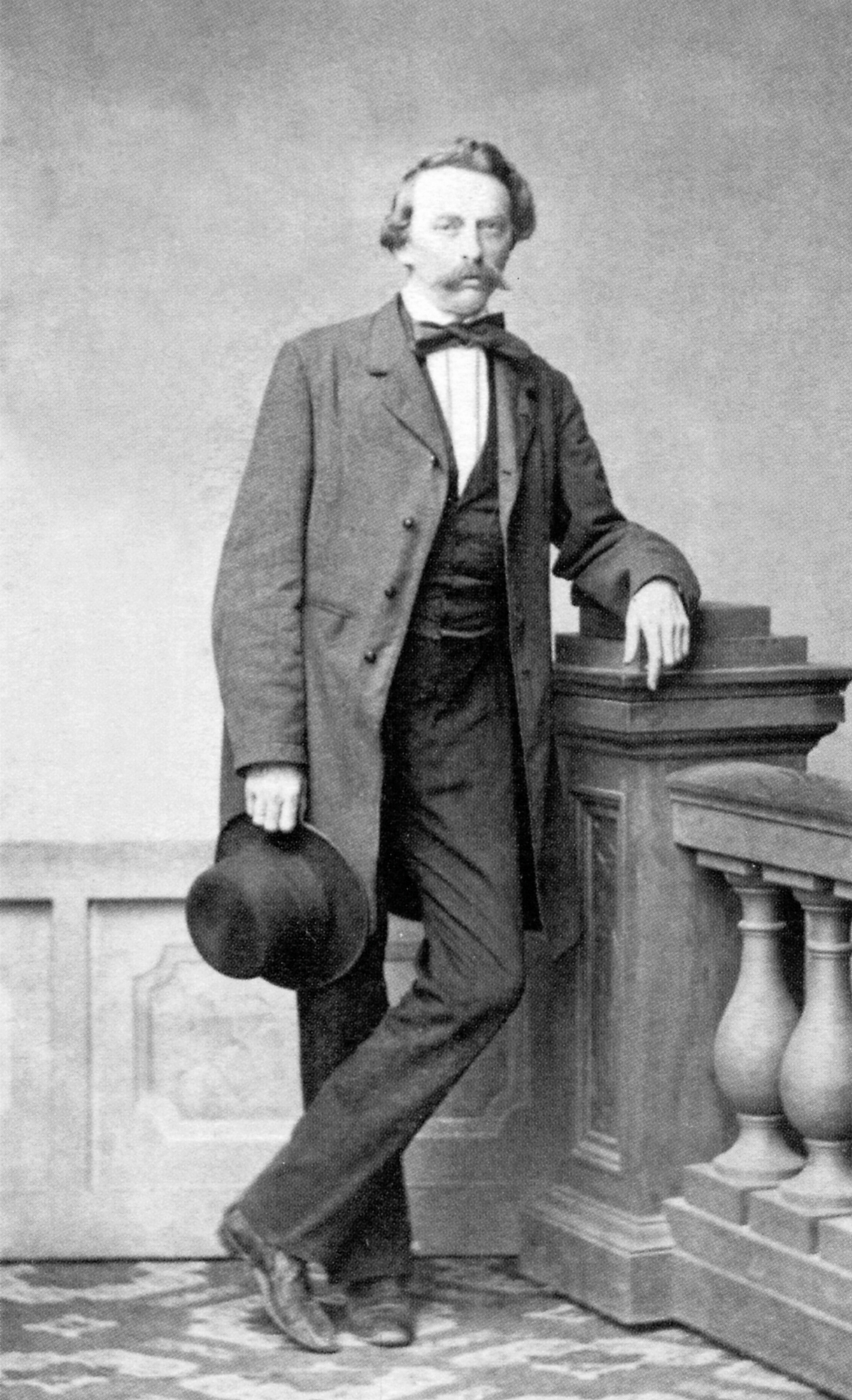
Moritz Wiggers.

Moritz Karl Georg Wiggers (October 17, 1816 – July 30, 1894), German politician, started out as a lawyer and a notary in his home town of Rostock. The Revolution of 1848 prompted him to enter public life as a representative to the Mecklenburg constitutional convention, of which he was also elected president. Once the constitution was adopted in 1849, he was elected to its legislature, again being named president. A court of arbitration in Freienwalde declared the constitution as invalid, and the legislature was dissolved in 1850. Wiggers regarded this action as illegal and called the legislature to meet again, but this was prevented by force. He was also tried for aiding the flight of Gottfried Kinkel from Spandau prison, but was acquitted. Nevertheless, he was caught up by the "Rostock high-treason proceedings." A police agent had infiltrated Wiggers' democratic club, and in 1853, he was tried for conspiracy and imprisoned. On his release in 1857, he remained a private citizen for a decade. In 1867, he was elected as representative from the third Berlin precinct (not being permitted to run in Mecklenburg) to the Reichstag of the North German Confederation. In 1871, he was elected as representative, from Berlin and Mecklenburg, to the German Reichstag. There he served with the German Progressive Party until 1881. After this time, he devoted himself to the construction of a canal between Rostock and Berlin. He was the author of several historical studies, political pamphlets and reports on the progress of the canal. His outstanding traits were his unyielding commitment to his liberal convictions and his peaceable nature.

== Works ==
- Die mecklenburgische Steuerreform (Tax Reform in Mecklenburg) (1861)
- Preußen und der Zollverein (Prussia and the Customs Union) (1862)
- Die Finanzverhältnisse des Großherzogtums Mecklenburg-Schwerins (Financial Affairs of the Grand Duchy of Mecklenburg-Schwerin) (1866)
