= Berliner Lokal-Anzeiger =

Die Berliner Lokal-Anzeiger
- Type: Berlin newspaper
- Publisher: August Scherl Verlag
- Founded: 1883
- Ceased publication: 1945
- Language: German
- Headquarters: Berlin

The Berliner Lokal-Anzeiger was a daily newspaper published in Berlin, with one of the highest national circulations of its time. Its publisher was newspaper magnate August Scherl, who also owned Die Woche, an illustrated weekly.

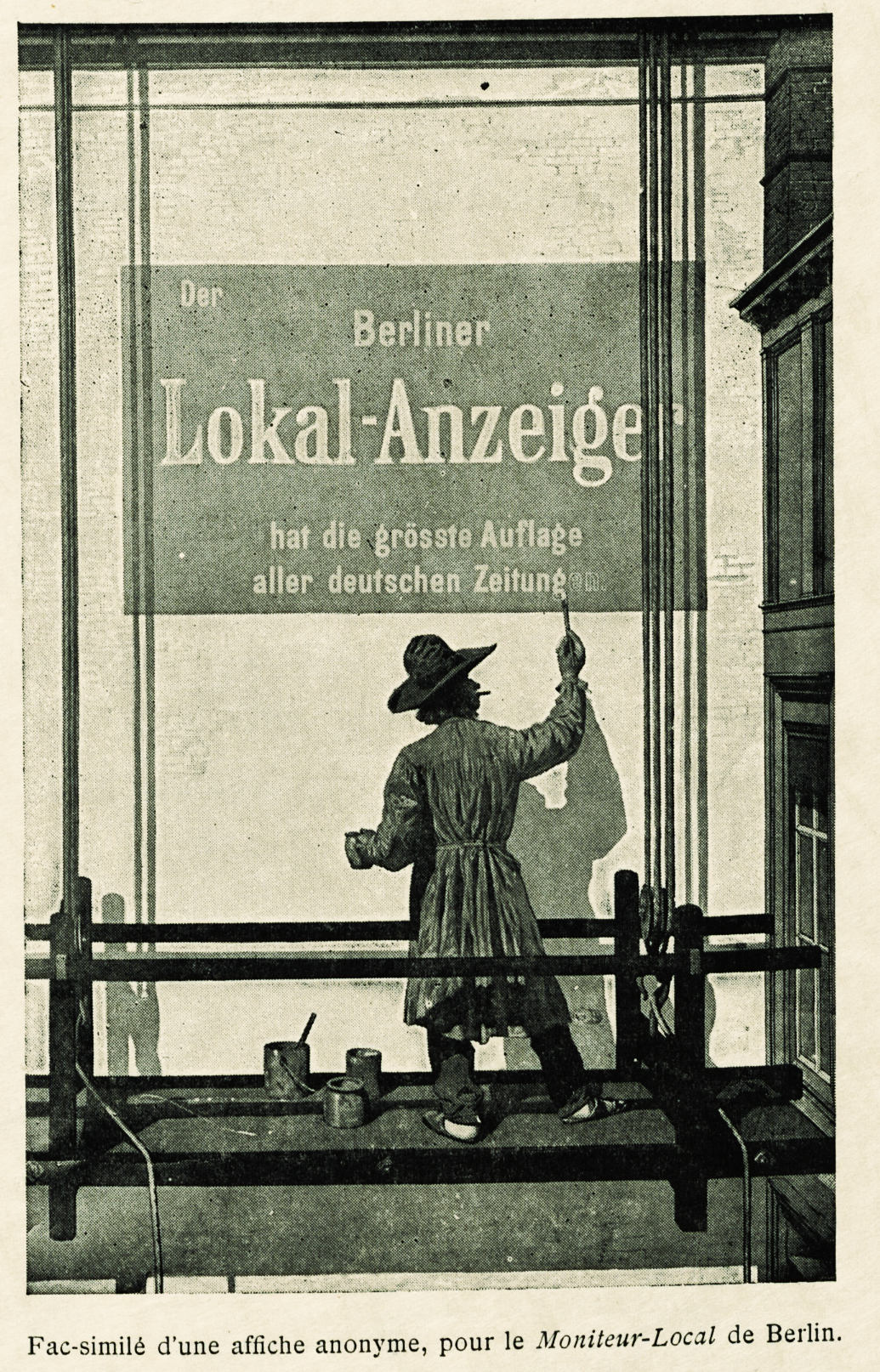
Berliner Lokal-Anzeiger advertisement in Berlin

. After 1916 the newspaper was owned by Alfred Hugenberg.

== Notable journalists ==
- Kurt Doerry (sport)
- Hans Dominik
- Wilhelm Klatte (feuilleton, musiccritics)
- Henry F. Urban
