= Illustrirte Zeitung =

German news magazine (1843–1944)

- Cover page dated 20 April 1911
- Categories: Illustrated news magazine
- Founder: Johann Jakob Weber
- Founded: 1843
- First issue: 1 July 1843
- Final issue Number: September 1944; 5041
- Country: Germany
- Based in: Leipzig
- Language: German language
- OCLC: 1775261

Illustrirte Zeitung (Note: The word "Illustrirt" is written in contemporary German mandatorily as "Illustriert" with an additional "e".) (German: Illustrated News) was Germany's first illustrated magazine that existed between 1843 and 1944. It was also known as Leipziger Illustrirte Zeitung. The magazine described itself as the Germany's illustrated magazine with an international view.

== History and profile ==
Illustrirte Zeitung was founded by Johann Jakob Weber in Leipzig in 1843. The Illustrated London News and L'Illustration that was published in Paris were the two models for the magazine which were both successful commercial enterprises.

The first issue of Illustrirte Zeitung was published on 1 July 1843. The magazine was a weekly news magazine which had a wide scope. It mostly covered news on daily affairs, public and social life, science and art, music, theatre and fashion. It was very popular among the bourgeois middle classes.

The magazine generally employed large photographs and art. It made significant contributions to the use of photographs in news. At the initial phase of the magazine, however, it was difficult for Johann Jakob Weber to find quality photographs to publish in the magazine due to the lack of good illustrations produced in Germany. Therefore, photographs were mostly taken from British media for a while. The magazine eventually began to employ the work by German artists.

Illustrirte Zeitung also included the theater-related essays by Roderich Benedix, Eduard Devrient, Heinrich Laube and Richard Wagner. Following the 5041st issue, the magazine ceased publication in September 1944.

== Circulation ==
Six months after its publication, the circulation of Illustrirte Zeitung was 7,500 copies. In 1846, it sold 11,000 copies.
