= Stanley Kubrick =

American filmmaker and photographer (1928–1999)

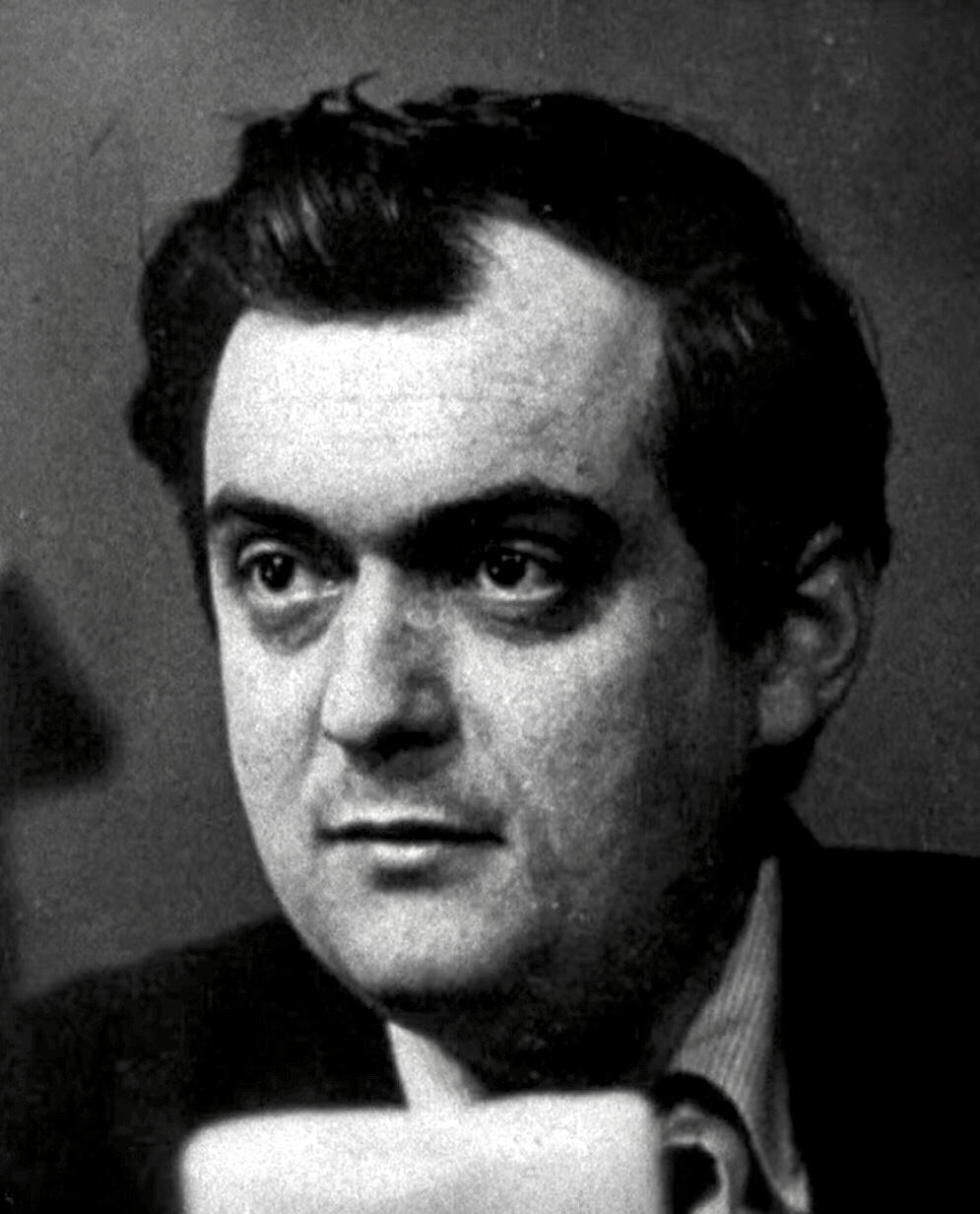
- Kubrick in 1963
- Born: July 26, 1928; New York City, U.S.
- Died: March 7, 1999 (aged 70); Childwickbury, Hertfordshire, England
- Occupations: Film director; producer; writer; photographer
- Years active: 1945–1999
- Works: Full list
- Spouses: Toba Metz (m. 1948; div. 1951); Ruth Sobotka (m. 1955; div. 1957); Christiane Harlan (m. 1958)
- Children: 2, including Vivian
- Awards: Full list

Stanley Kubrick (Note: /ˈkuːbrɪk/ KOO-brick) (July 26, 1928 – March 7, 1999) was an American filmmaker and photographer. A prominent figure of the New Hollywood era, Kubrick is regarded as one of the greatest and most influential filmmakers. His films spanned a number of genres and gained recognition for their attention to detail, innovative cinematography, extensive set design, and dark humor.

Born in New York City, Kubrick worked as a photographer for Look magazine in the late 1940s and early 1950s. He made his first major Hollywood film, The Killing, in 1956. This was followed by two collaborations with Kirk Douglas: the anti-war film Paths of Glory (1957) and the historical epic Spartacus (1960). In 1961, Kubrick settled in England. In 1978, he made his home at Childwickbury Manor with his wife Christiane, and it became his workplace where he centralized the writing, research, editing, and management of his productions. This permitted him almost complete artistic control over his films, with the rare advantage of financial support from major Hollywood studios. His first productions in England were two films with Peter Sellers: the comedy-drama Lolita (1962) and the Cold War satire Dr. Strangelove (1964).

A perfectionist who assumed direct control over most aspects of his filmmaking, Kubrick cultivated expertise in writing, editing, color grading, promotion, and exhibition. He was famous for the painstaking care taken in researching his films and staging scenes. He frequently asked for several dozen retakes of the same shot, often confusing and frustrating his actors. Many of Kubrick's films broke new cinematic ground and are now considered landmarks. The scientific realism and innovative special effects in his science fiction epic 2001: A Space Odyssey (1968) were a first in cinema history; the film earned him his only Academy Award (for Best Visual Effects) and is regarded as one of the greatest films ever made.

While many of Kubrick's films were controversial and initially received mixed reviews upon release—particularly the brutal A Clockwork Orange (1971), which Kubrick withdrew from circulation in the UK following a media frenzy—most were nominated for Academy Awards, Golden Globes, or BAFTA Awards, and underwent critical re-evaluations. With the horror film The Shining (1980), he became one of the first directors to make use of a Steadicam for stabilized and fluid tracking shots, a technology vital to his Vietnam War film Full Metal Jacket (1987). A few days after hosting a screening for his family and the stars of his final film, Eyes Wide Shut (1999), he died at the age of 70.

== Early life ==
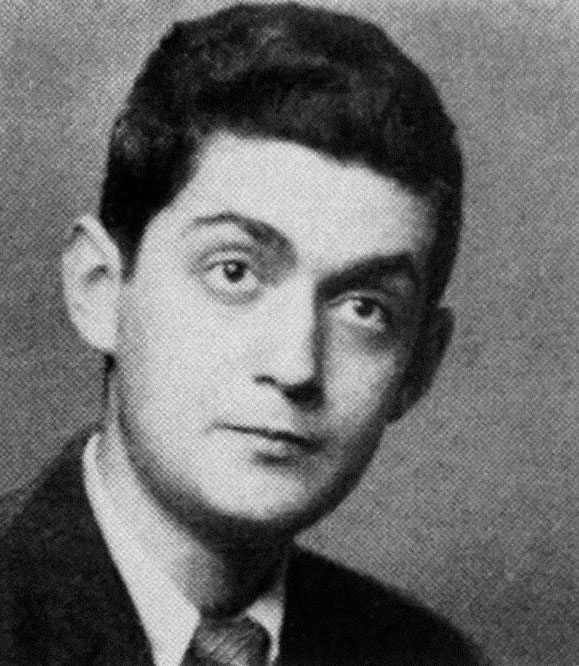
High school senior portrait of Kubrick, age 16, c. 1944–1945

Stanley Kubrick was born in the Lying-In Hospital in New York City's Manhattan borough on July 26, 1928. He was the first of two children of Jacob Leonard Kubrick, known as Jack or Jacques, and his wife Sadie Gertrude Kubrick (née Perveler), known as Gert. His sister Barbara was born in 1934. At Stanley's birth, the Kubricks lived in the Bronx at 2160 Clinton Avenue in the Belmont neighborhood. His parents married in a Jewish ceremony, but Kubrick was not raised religious. His father was a homeopathic doctor and, by the standards of the West Bronx, the family was fairly wealthy.

Soon after his sister's birth, Kubrick began attending Public School 3 in the Bronx and moved to Public School 90 in June 1938. His IQ was above average but his attendance was poor. He displayed an interest in literature from a young age and began reading Greek and Roman myths and the fables of the Brothers Grimm. When Kubrick was 12, his father Jack taught him chess. The game remained a lifelong interest of Kubrick's, appearing in many of his films. Kubrick, who later became a member of the United States Chess Federation, explained that chess helped him develop "patience and discipline". When Kubrick was 13, his father bought him a Graflex camera, triggering a fascination with still photography. He befriended a neighbor, Marvin Traub, who shared his passion for photography. Traub had his own darkroom where he and the young Kubrick would spend many hours perusing photographs and watching the chemicals "magically make images on photographic paper". The two roamed the streets looking for interesting subjects to photograph and spent time in local cinemas. Freelance photographer Weegee (Arthur Fellig) had a considerable influence on Kubrick's development as a photographer; Kubrick later hired Fellig as the special stills photographer for Dr. Strangelove (1964). As a teenager, Kubrick was also interested in jazz and briefly attempted a career as a drummer.

Kubrick attended William Howard Taft High School from 1941 to 1945. He joined the school's photography club, photographing school events in their magazine. He was a mediocre student. Introverted and shy, Kubrick often skipped school to watch films. He graduated in 1945 but his poor grades, combined with the demand for college admissions from soldiers returning from World War II, eliminated any hope of higher education. Later in life Kubrick maintained that schools were ineffective in stimulating critical thinking and student interest. His father was disappointed in his son's failure to achieve the excellence in school of which he knew Stanley was capable. Jack also encouraged Stanley to read from the family library at home, while permitting Stanley to take up photography as a serious hobby.

== Photography career ==
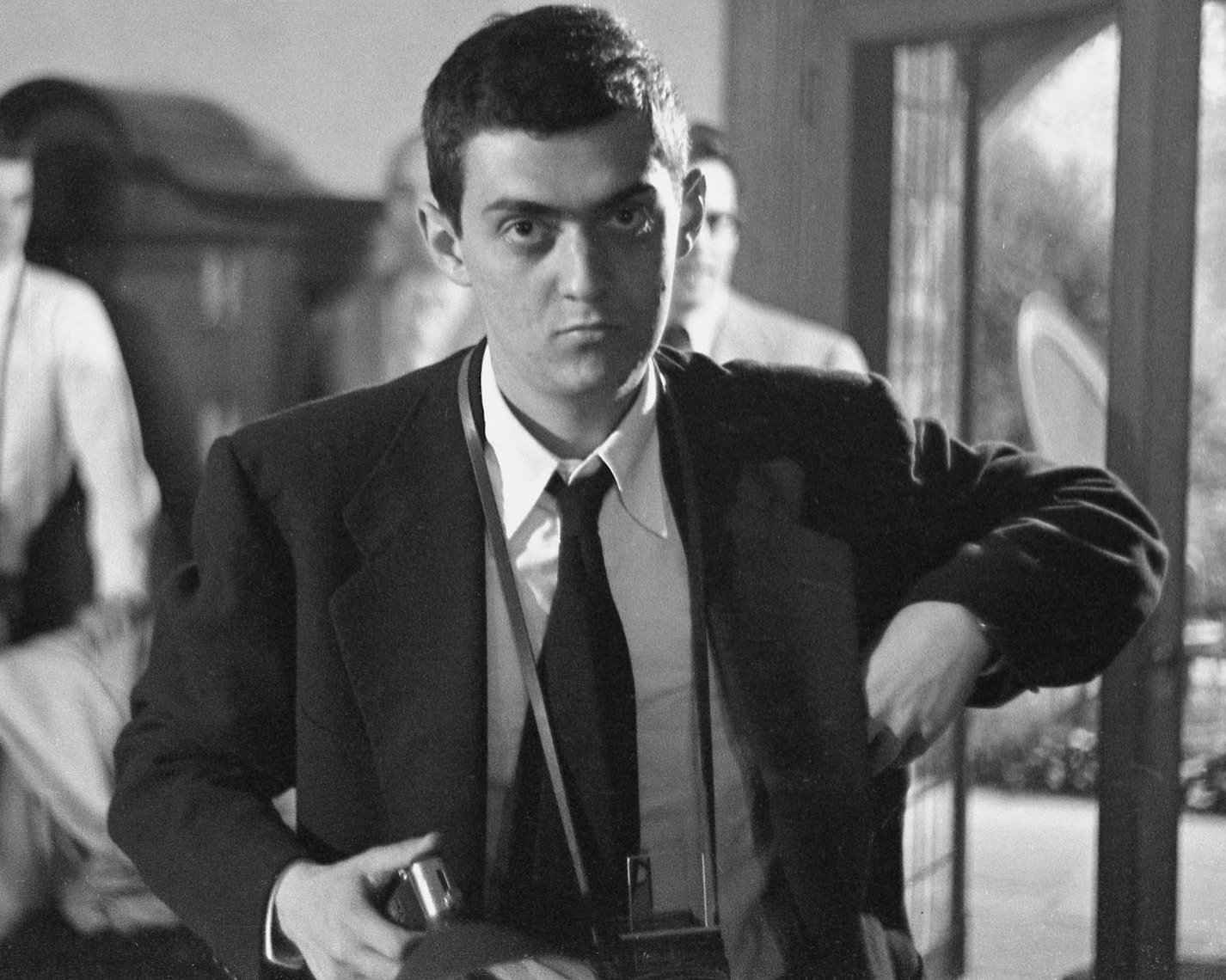
Portrait of Kubrick with a camera at the Sadler's Wells Theatre in London, 1949, while a staff photographer for Look

While in high school, Kubrick was chosen as an official school photographer. In the mid-1940s, since he was unable to gain admission to day session classes at colleges, he briefly attended evening classes at the City College of New York, which had open admissions. Eventually, he sold a photographic series to Look magazine, (Note: 1 pound sterling was equivalent to US$4.03 in 1945.) which was printed on June 26, 1945. Kubrick supplemented his income by playing chess "for quarters" in Washington Square Park and Manhattan chess clubs.

In 1946, he became an apprentice photographer for Look and later a full-time staff photographer. Kubrick quickly became known for his story-telling in photographs. In 1948, he was sent to Portugal to document a travel piece, and later that year covered the Ringling Bros. and Barnum & Bailey Circus in Sarasota, Florida. (Note: Coverage of the circus gave Kubrick grounds for developing his documentary skills and capturing athletic movements on camera; the photos were published in a four-page spread for the May 25 issue, "Meet the People". The same issue also covered his journalism work documenting the work of opera star Risë Stevens with deaf children.)

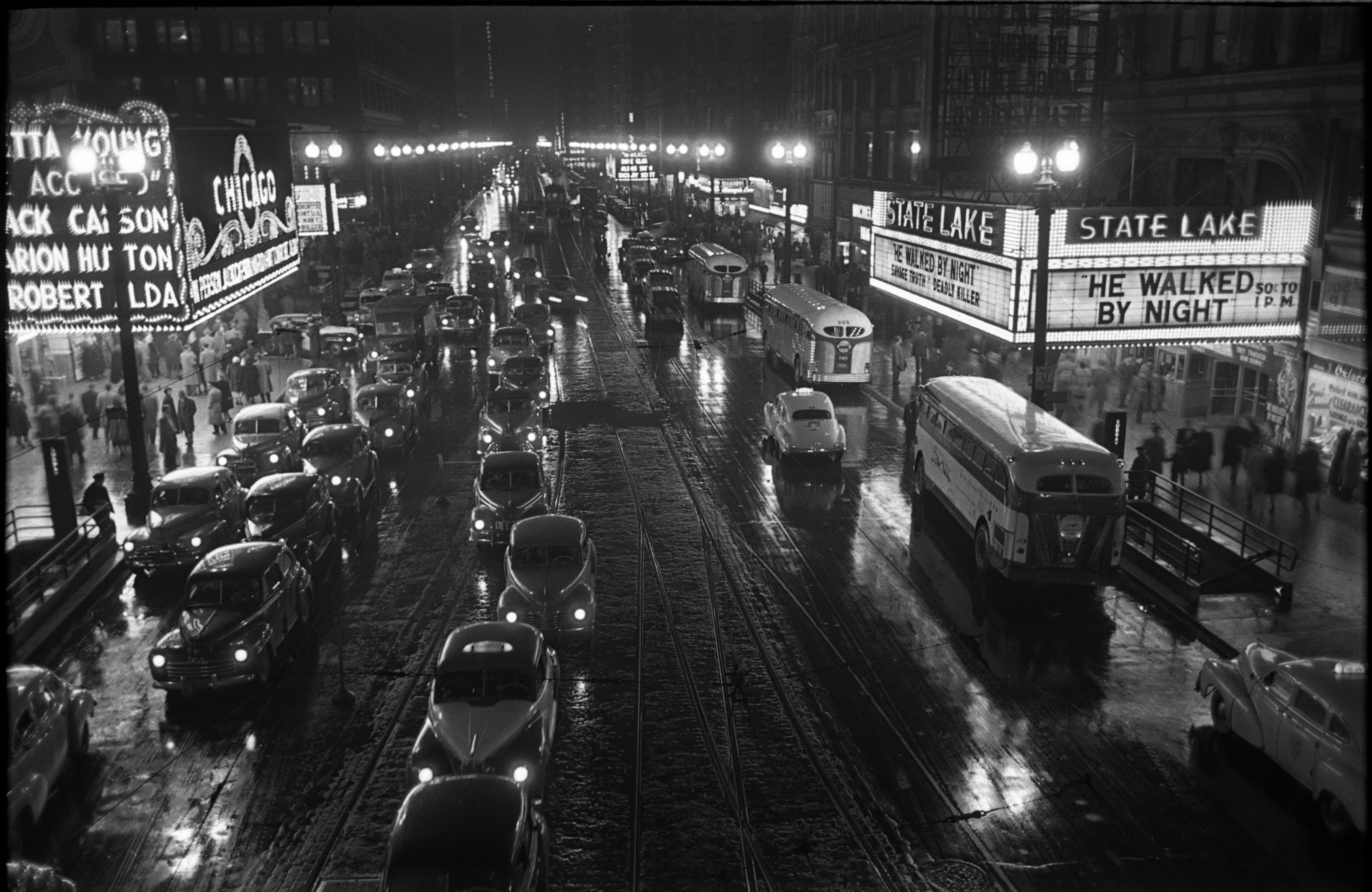
Photo of a Chicago streetscape taken by Kubrick for Look magazine, 1949, from State/Lake station

A boxing enthusiast, Kubrick eventually began photographing boxing matches for the magazine. His earliest, "Prizefighter", was published on January 18, 1949, and captured a boxing match and the events leading up to it, featuring American middleweight Walter Cartier. On April 2, 1949, he published photo essay "Chicago-City of Extremes" in Look, which displayed his early talent for creating atmosphere with imagery. Kubrick was also assigned to photograph numerous jazz musicians.

Kubrick married his high-school sweetheart Toba Metz on May 28, 1948. They lived at 36 West 16th Street, just north of Greenwich Village. During this time, Kubrick began frequenting film screenings. He was inspired by the complex, fluid camerawork of French director Max Ophüls, whose films influenced Kubrick's visual style, and by director Elia Kazan, whom he described as America's "best director" at that time, with his ability of "performing miracles" with his actors. Friends began to notice Kubrick had become obsessed with the art of filmmaking—one friend, David Vaughan, observed that Kubrick would scrutinize the film at the cinema when it went silent, and would go back to reading his paper when people started talking. He spent many hours reading books on film theory and writing notes. He was particularly inspired by Sergei Eisenstein and Arthur Rothstein, the photographic technical director of Look magazine. (Note: Kubrick was particularly fascinated with Eisenstein's Alexander Nevsky and played the Prokofiev soundtrack to the film over and over constantly to the point that his sister broke it in fury.)

== Film career ==
=== Short films (1951–1953) ===
Kubrick shared a love of film with his school friend Alexander Singer. Through Singer, who worked in the offices of the newsreel production company The March of Time, Kubrick learned it could cost $40,000 to make a proper short film, a sum he could not afford. He produced a few short documentaries with encouragement from Singer.

Kubrick decided to make a short film documentary about boxer Walter Cartier, whom he had photographed and written about for Look magazine a year earlier. He rented a camera and produced a 16-minute black-and-white documentary, Day of the Fight. Kubrick found the money independently to finance it. He had considered asking Montgomery Clift to narrate it, but settled on CBS news veteran Douglas Edwards. According to Paul Duncan the film was "remarkably accomplished for a first film", and used a backward tracking shot to film a scene in which Cartier and his brother walk towards the camera, a device which later became one of Kubrick's characteristic camera movements. Vincent Cartier, Walter's brother and manager, later reflected, "Stanley was a very stoic, impassive but imaginative type person with strong, imaginative thoughts. He commanded respect in a quiet, shy way. Whatever he wanted, you complied, he just captivated you. Anybody who worked with Stanley did just what Stanley wanted". (Note: Walter Cartier also said of Kubrick: "Stanley comes in prepared like a fighter for a big fight, he knows exactly what he's doing, where he's going and what he wants to accomplish. He knew the challenges and he overcame them".) After a score was added by Singer's friend Gerald Fried, Kubrick had spent $3900 in making it, and sold it to RKO-Pathé for $4000, which was the most the company had ever paid for a short film at the time. Kubrick described his first effort at filmmaking as having been valuable, later declaring that the "best education in film is to make one".

External videos
- One of Kubrick's early short films, Flying Padre on YouTube

Inspired by this early success, Kubrick quit his job at Look and visited professional filmmakers in New York City to learn the technical aspects of filmmaking. He stated that he was given the confidence during this period to become a filmmaker because of the number of bad films he had seen, remarking, "I don't know a goddamn thing about movies, but I know I can make a better film than that". He began making Flying Padre (1951), a film about Reverend Fred Stadtmueller, who travels some 12,000 miles annually to visit his 11 churches. Flying Padre was followed by The Seafarers (1953), Kubrick's first color film, which was shot for the Seafarers International Union in June 1953. For the cafeteria scene in the film, Kubrick chose a dolly shot to establish the life of the seafarer's community; this kind of shot would later become a signature technique. Day of the Fight, Flying Padre and The Seafarers constitute Kubrick's only surviving documentary works; some historians believe he made others.

=== Early feature work (1953–1955) ===
Fear and Desire (1953)

After raising $1000 showing his short films to friends and family, Kubrick found the finances to begin making his first feature film, Fear and Desire (1953), written by his friend Howard Sackler. Kubrick's uncle, Martin Perveler, a Los Angeles pharmacy owner, invested $9000 on condition that he be credited as executive producer of the film. Kubrick assembled a small crew totaling fourteen people and flew to the San Gabriel Mountains in California for a five-week, low-budget shoot. It is a fictional allegory about a team of soldiers who survive a plane crash and are caught behind enemy lines in a war. One of the soldiers becomes infatuated with an attractive girl in the woods and binds her to a tree. This scene and others are noted for their rapid close-ups on the faces of the cast. Kubrick had intended for Fear and Desire to be a silent picture to ensure low production costs; the added sounds, effects, and music ultimately brought production costs to around $53,000, exceeding the budget. He was bailed out by producer Richard de Rochemont on the condition that he help in de Rochemont's production of a five-part television series about Abraham Lincoln.

Fear and Desire was a commercial failure, but garnered positive reviews upon release. The reviewer from The New York Times believed that Kubrick's professionalism as a photographer shone through in the picture, and that he "artistically caught glimpses of the grotesque attitudes of death, the wolfishness of hungry men, as well as their bestiality, and in one scene, the wracking effect of lust on a pitifully juvenile soldier and the pinioned girl he is guarding". Columbia University scholar Mark Van Doren was highly impressed by the scenes with the girl bound to the tree, remarking that it would live on as a "beautiful, terrifying and weird" sequence which illustrated Kubrick's immense talent and guaranteed his future success. Kubrick himself later expressed embarrassment with Fear and Desire, and attempted over the years to disown it, keeping prints of the film out of circulation. (Note: Kubrick called Fear and Desire a "bumbling, amateur film exercise ... a completely inept oddity, boring and pretentious", and also referred to it as "a lousy feature, very self-conscious, easily discernible as an intellectual effort, but very roughly, and poorly, and ineffectively made".) During the production of the film, Kubrick accidentally almost killed his cast with poisonous gasses.

Following Fear and Desire, Kubrick began working on ideas for a new boxing film. Due to the commercial failure of his first feature, Kubrick avoided asking for investments, but commenced a film noir script with Howard O. Sackler. Originally under the title Kiss Me, Kill Me, and then The Nymph and the Maniac, Killer's Kiss (1955) is a film noir about a young boxer's involvement with a woman being abused by her criminal boss. Like Fear and Desire, it was privately funded by Kubrick's family and friends, with some $40,000 put forward from Bronx pharmacist Morris Bousse. Kubrick began shooting footage in Times Square, and frequently explored during the filming process, experimenting with cinematography and considering the use of unconventional angles and imagery. He initially chose to record the sound on location, but encountered difficulties with shadows from the microphone booms, restricting camera movement. His decision to drop the sound in favor of imagery was a costly one; after 12–14 weeks shooting the picture, he spent some seven months and $35,000 working on the sound. Actress Irene Kane, the star of Killer's Kiss, observed: "Stanley's a fascinating character. He thinks movies should move, with a minimum of dialogue, and he's all for sex and sadism". Killer's Kiss met with limited commercial success. Critics have praised the film's camerawork, but its acting and story are generally considered mediocre. (Note: Kubrick himself thought of the film as an amateurish effort—a student film. Despite this, the film historian Alexander Walker considers the film to be "oddly compelling".)

=== Hollywood success and beyond (1955–1962) ===
While playing chess in Washington Square, Kubrick met producer James B. Harris. The two formed the Harris-Kubrick Pictures Corporation in 1955. Harris purchased the rights to Lionel White's novel Clean Break for $10,000 (Note: Harris beat United Artists in the purchase of the rights for the film, who were interested in it as the next picture for Frank Sinatra. They eventually settled for financing $200,000 towards the production.) and Kubrick wrote the script, but at Kubrick's suggestion, they hired film noir novelist Jim Thompson to write the dialog for the film—which became The Killing (1956)—about a racetrack robbery gone wrong. Kubrick and Harris moved to Los Angeles and signed with the Jaffe Agency to shoot the picture, which became Kubrick's first full-length feature film shot with a professional cast and crew. The Union in Hollywood stated that Kubrick would not be permitted to be both the director and the cinematographer, resulting in the hiring of veteran cinematographer Lucien Ballard. Kubrick clashed with Ballard during the shooting, and on one occasion threatened to fire Ballard following a camera dispute. The film's star Sterling Hayden recalled Kubrick was "cold and detached. Very mechanical, always confident. I've worked with few directors who are that good". The Killing failed to secure a proper release across the United States; the film made little money, and was promoted only at the last minute, as a second feature to the Western Bandido! (1956). Several contemporary critics lauded the film. Today, critics generally consider The Killing to be among the best films of Kubrick's early career; its nonlinear narrative and clinical execution also had a major influence on later directors of crime films. Dore Schary of Metro-Goldwyn-Mayer (MGM) was highly impressed as well, and offered Kubrick and Harris $75,000 to write, direct, and produce a film, which ultimately became Paths of Glory (1957). (Note: Kubrick and Harris had thought that the positive reception from critics had made their presence known in Hollywood, but Max Youngstein of United Artists disagreed with Schary on the merit of the film and still considered Kubrick and Harris to be "Not far from the bottom" of the pool of new talent at the time.)

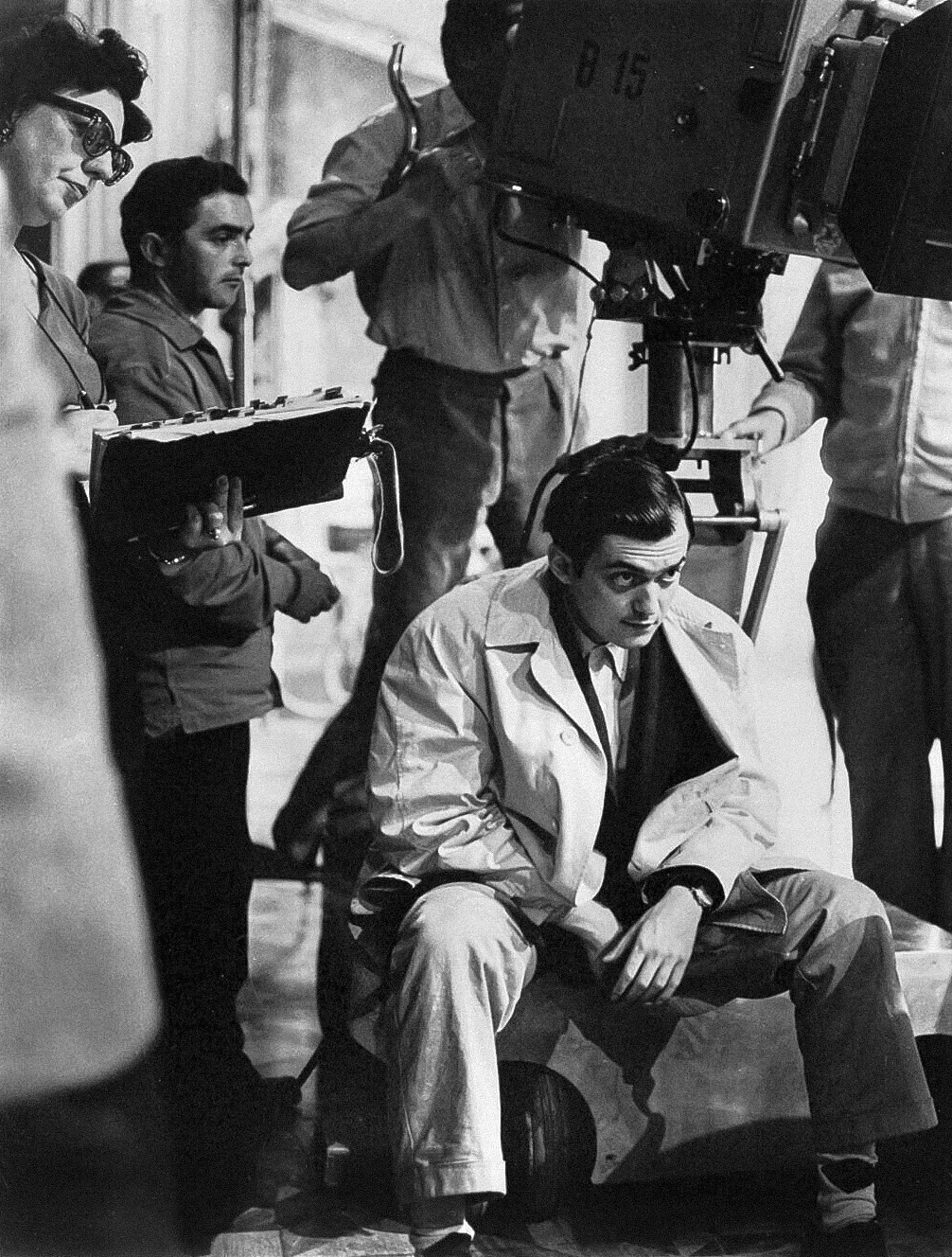
Kubrick during the filming of Paths of Glory in 1957

Paths of Glory, set during World War I, is based on Humphrey Cobb's 1935 antiwar novel of the same name. Schary stated that MGM would not finance another war picture, given their backing of the anti-war film The Red Badge of Courage (1951). (Note: Kubrick and Schary agreed to work on Stefan Zweig's The Burning Secret, and Kubrick began working on a script with novelist Calder Willingham. He refused to forget Paths of Glory, and secretly began drafting a script at night with Jim Thompson.) After Schary was fired by MGM in a major shake-up, Kubrick and Harris managed to interest Kirk Douglas in playing Colonel Dax. (Note: Douglas informed United Artists that he would not do The Vikings (1958) unless they agreed to make Paths of Glory and pay $850,000 to make it. Kubrick and Harris signed a five-film deal with Douglas's Bryna Productions and accepted a fee of $20,000 and a percentage of the profits in comparison to Douglas's salary of $350,000.) Douglas, in turn, signed Harris-Kubrick Pictures to a three-picture co-production deal with his film production company, Bryna Productions, which secured a financing and distribution deal for Paths of Glory and two subsequent films with United Artists. The film, shot in Munich, from March 1957, included a battle scene for which Kubrick meticulously lined up six cameras one after the other along the boundary of no-man's land, with each camera capturing a specific field and numbered, and gave each of the hundreds of extras a number for the zone in which they would die. Kubrick operated an Arriflex camera for the battle, zooming in on Douglas. Paths of Glory became Kubrick's first significant commercial success, and established him as an up-and-coming young filmmaker. Critics praised the film's unsentimental and unvarnished combat scenes and its raw, black-and-white cinematography. Despite the praise, the Christmas release date was criticized, and the subject was controversial in Europe. The film was banned in France until 1974 for its "unflattering" depiction of the French military, and was censored by the Swiss Army until 1970.

In October 1957, after Paths of Glory had its world premiere in Germany, Bryna Productions optioned Canadian church minister-turned-safecracker Herbert Emerson Wilsons's autobiography, I Stole $16,000,000, especially for Kubrick and James B. Harris. The picture was to be the second in the co-production deal between Bryna Productions and Harris-Kubrick Pictures, which Kubrick was to write and direct, Harris to co-produce and Douglas to co-produce and star. In November 1957, Gavin Lambert was signed as story editor and with Kubrick finished a script titled God Fearing Man, but the picture was never filmed.

Marlon Brando contacted Kubrick, asking him to direct a film adaptation of the Charles Neider western novel, The Authentic Death of Hendry Jones, featuring Pat Garrett and Billy the Kid. (Note: This is disputed by Carlo Fiore, who has claimed that Brando had not heard of Kubrick initially and that it was he who arranged a dinner meeting between Brando and Kubrick.) Brando was impressed, saying "Stanley is unusually perceptive, and delicately attuned to people. He has an adroit intellect, and is a creative thinker—not a repeater, not a fact-gatherer. He digests what he learns and brings to a new project an original point of view and a reserved passion". The two worked on a script for six months, begun by a then unknown Sam Peckinpah. Many disputes broke out over the project, and in the end, Kubrick distanced himself from what would become One-Eyed Jacks (1961). (Note: According to biographer John Baxter, Kubrick was furious with Brando's casting of France Nuyen, and when Kubrick had confessed to still "not knowing what the picture was about", Brando snapped "I'll tell you what it's about. It's about $300,000 that I've already paid Karl Malden". Kubrick was then reported to have been fired and accepted a parting fee of $100,000, though a 1960 Entertainment Weekly article claims he quit as director, and that Kubrick had been quoted as saying "Brando wanted to direct the movie". Kubrick's biographer LoBrutto states that for contractual reasons, Kubrick was not able to cite the real reason, but issued a statement saying that he had resigned "with deep regret because of my respect and admiration for one of the world's foremost artists".)

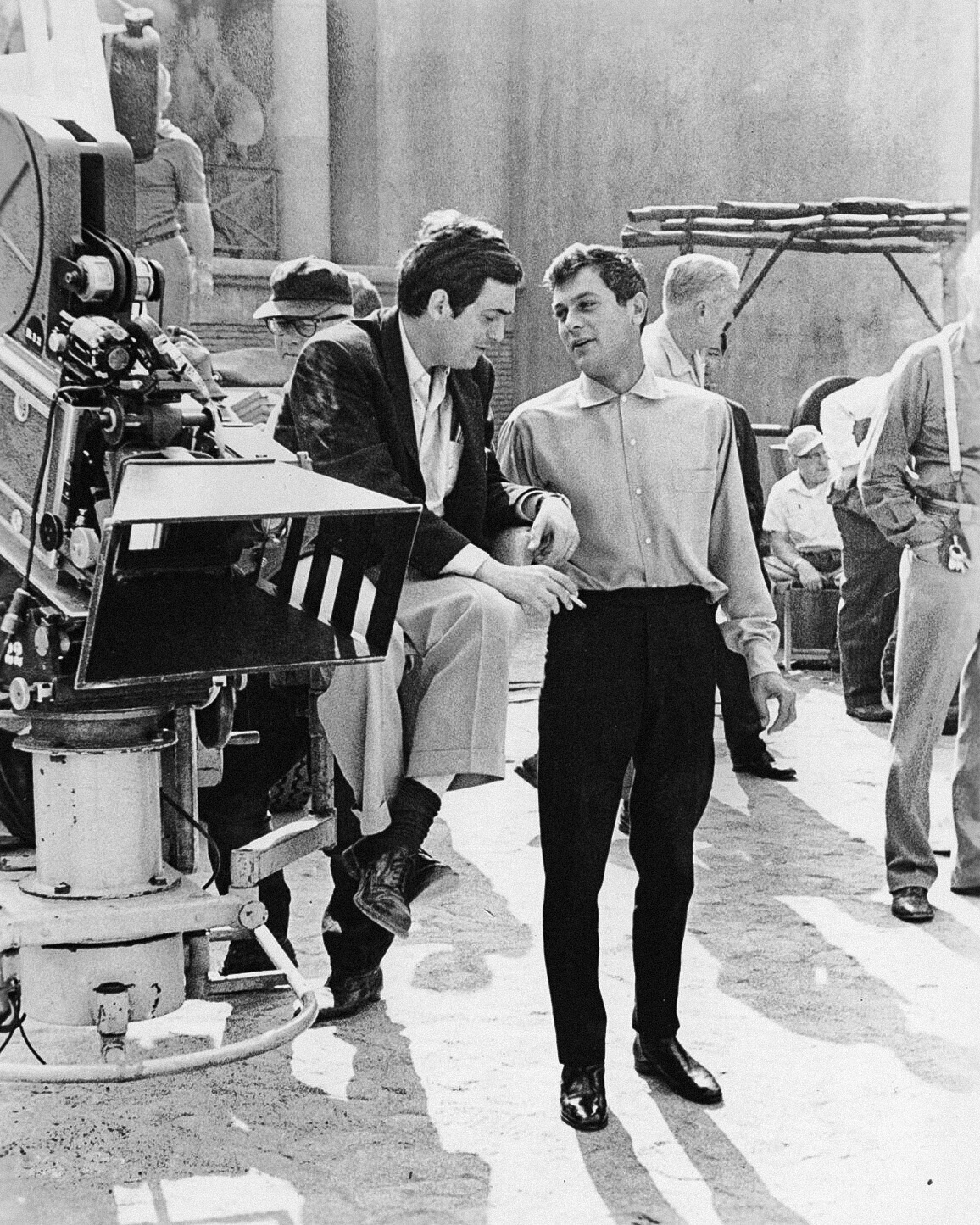
Kubrick and Tony Curtis on the set of Spartacus in 1960

In February 1959, Kirk Douglas asked Kubrick to direct Spartacus (1960), based on the historical Spartacus and the Third Servile War. Douglas had acquired the rights to the novel by Howard Fast and blacklisted screenwriter Dalton Trumbo began penning the script. It was produced by Douglas, who also starred as Spartacus, and cast Laurence Olivier as his foe, the Roman general and politician Marcus Licinius Crassus. Douglas hired Kubrick for a reported $150,000 fee soon after he fired director Anthony Mann. With a cast of over 10,000 and a budget of $6 million, (Note: Spartacus eventually cost a reported $12 million to produce and earned only $14.6 million.) this was the most expensive film ever made in America at that time, and Kubrick became the youngest director in Hollywood history to make an epic. It was the first time that Kubrick filmed using the anamorphic 35 mm horizontal Super Technirama process to achieve ultra-high definition, which allowed him to capture large panoramic scenes, including one with 8,000 trained soldiers from Spain representing the Roman army. (Note: The battle scenes of Spartacus were shot over six weeks in Spain in mid-1959. Biographer John Baxter has criticized some of the battle scenes, describing them as "awkwardly directed, with some clumsy stunt action and a plethora of improbable horse falls".) Kubrick complained about not having full creative control, insisting on improvising extensively during the production. (Note: A problematic production in that Kubrick wanted to shoot at a slow pace of two camera set-ups a day, but the studio insisted that he do 32; a compromise of eight had to be made. Stills cameraman William Read Woodfield questioned the casting and acting abilities of some of the actors such as Timothy Carey, and cinematographer Russell Metty disagreed with Kubrick's use of light, threatening to quit, but later muting his criticisms after winning the Oscar for Best Cinematography.) Kubrick and Douglas were also at odds over the script, with Kubrick angering Douglas when he cut all but two of his lines from the opening 30 minutes. Despite the on-set troubles, Spartacus took $14.6 million at the box office in its first run. The film established Kubrick as a major director, receiving six Academy Award nominations and winning four; it ultimately convinced him that if so much could be made of such a problematic production, he could achieve anything. Spartacus also marked the end of the working relationship between Kubrick and Douglas. (Note: According to biographer Baxter, Douglas continued to resent Kubrick's domination during production, remarking, "He'll be a fine director some day, if he falls flat on his face just once. It might teach him how to compromise". Douglas later stated: "You don't have to be a nice person to be extremely talented. You can be a shit and be talented and, conversely, you can be the nicest guy in the world and not have any talent. Stanley Kubrick is a talented shit.")

=== Collaboration with Peter Sellers (1962–1964) ===
==== Lolita ====
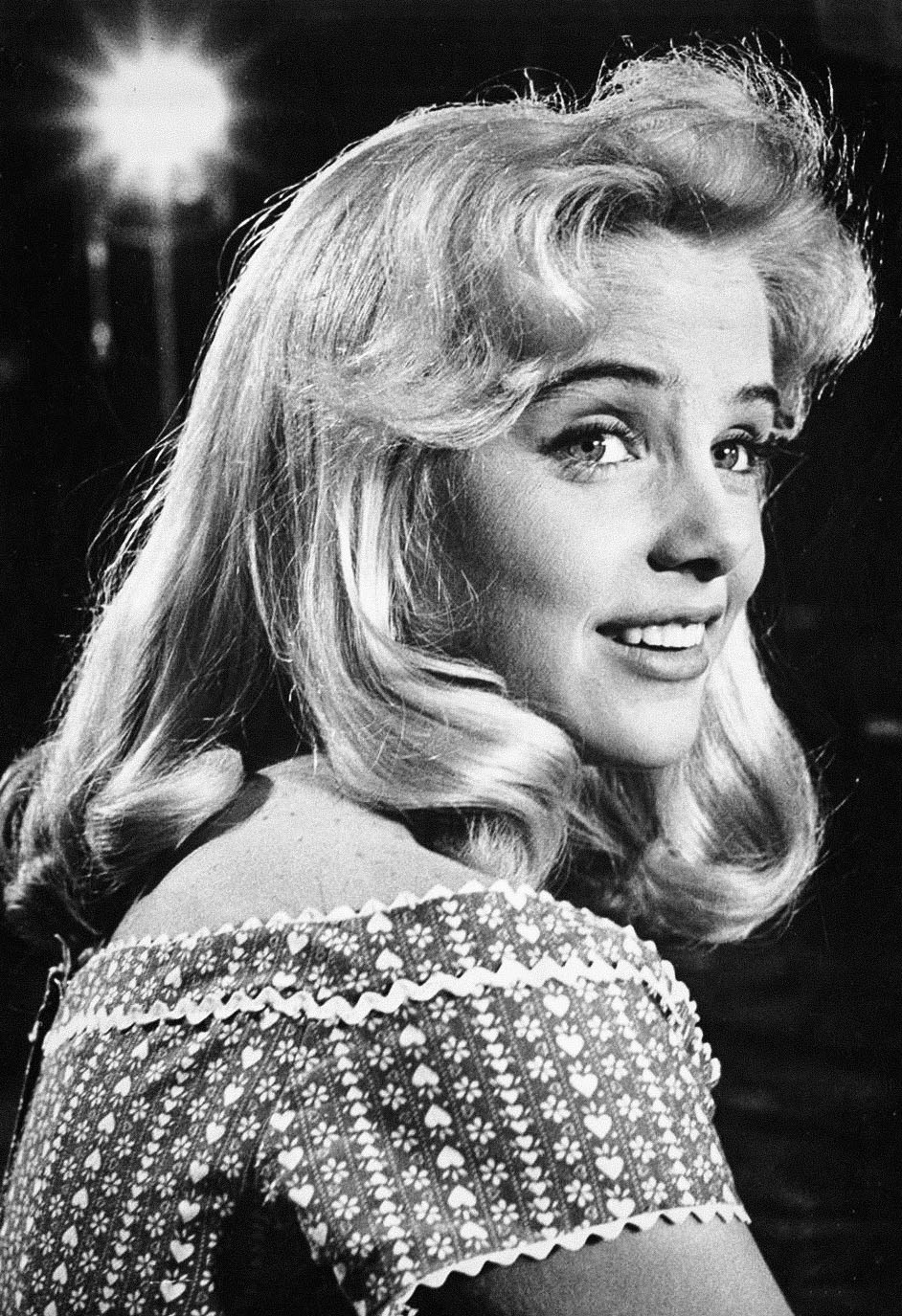
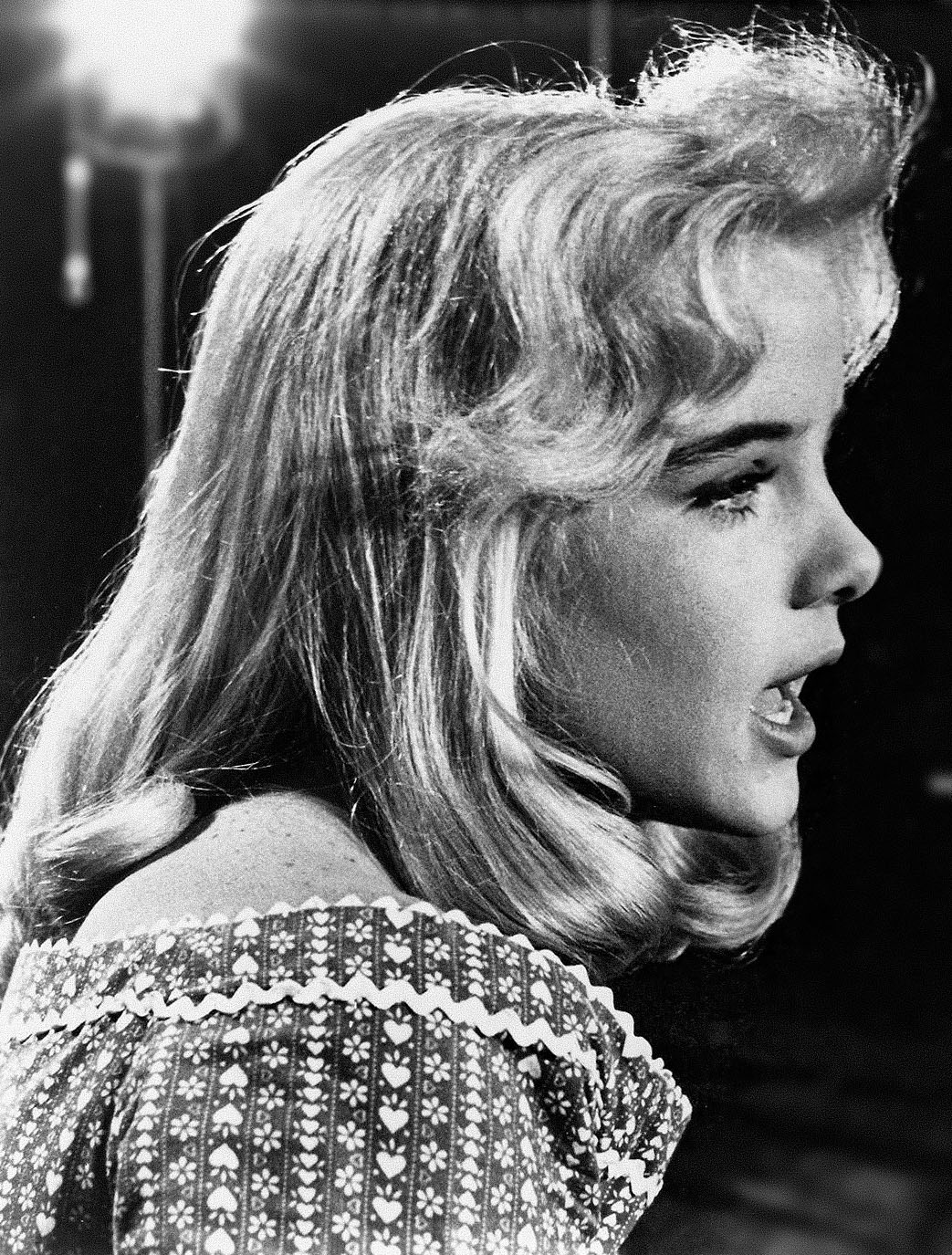
Two portrait photographs—both taken by Kubrick—of Sue Lyon, who played the role of Dolores "Lolita" Haze in Lolita

Kubrick and Harris decided to start production of Kubrick's next film Lolita (1962) in England, due to clauses placed on the contract by producers Warner Bros. that gave them complete control over the film, and the fact that the Eady plan permitted producers to write off the costs if 80% of the crew were British. They signed a $1 million deal with Eliot Hyman's Associated Artists Productions, and a clause which gave them the artistic freedom that they desired. Lolita, Kubrick's first attempt at black comedy, was an adaptation of the novel of the same name by Vladimir Nabokov, the story of a middle-aged college professor becoming infatuated with a 12-year-old girl. Stylistically, Lolita, starring Peter Sellers, James Mason, Shelley Winters, and Sue Lyon, was a transitional film for Kubrick, "marking the turning point from a naturalistic cinema ... to the surrealism of the later films", according to film critic Gene Youngblood. Kubrick was impressed by the range of actor Peter Sellers and gave him one of his first opportunities to improvise wildly during shooting, while filming him with three cameras. (Note: The two got on during production, displaying many similarities; both left school prematurely, played jazz drums, and shared a fascination with photography. Sellers would later claim that "Kubrick is a god as far as I'm concerned".)

Kubrick shot Lolita over 88 days on a $2 million budget at Elstree Studios, between October 1960 and March 1961. Kubrick often clashed with Shelley Winters, whom he found "very difficult" and nearly fired at one point. Because of its provocative story, Lolita was Kubrick's first film to generate controversy; he was ultimately forced to comply with censors and remove much of the erotic element of the relationship between Mason's Humbert and Lyon's Lolita which had been evident in Nabokov's novel. The film was not a major critical or commercial success, earning $3.7 million at the box office on its opening run. (Note: Kubrick and Harris had proved they could adapt a highly controversial novel without studio interference. The moderate earnings allowed them to set up companies in Switzerland to take advantage of low taxes on their profits and give them financial security for life.) Lolita has since become critically acclaimed.

==== Dr. Strangelove ====
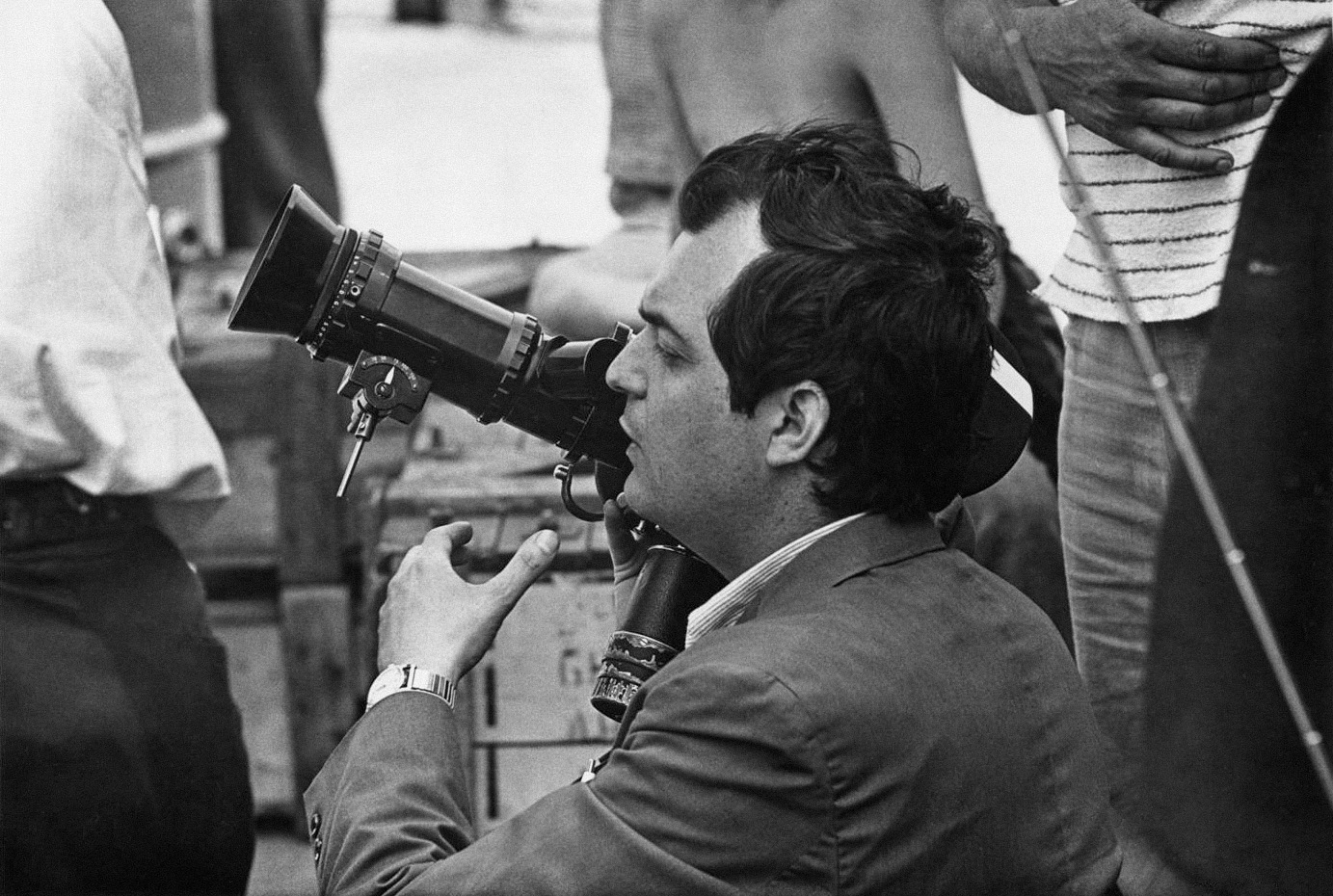
Kubrick during the production of Dr. Strangelove in 1963

Dr. Strangelove trailer

Kubrick's next project was Dr. Strangelove or: How I Learned to Stop Worrying and Love the Bomb (1964), another satirical black comedy. Kubrick became preoccupied with the issue of nuclear war as the Cold War unfolded in the 1950s, and even considered moving to Australia because he feared that New York City might be a likely target for the Russians. He studied over 40 military and political research books on the subject and eventually reached the conclusion that "nobody really knew anything and the whole situation was absurd".

After buying the rights to the novel Red Alert, Kubrick collaborated with its author, Peter George, on the script. It was originally written as a serious political thriller, but Kubrick decided that a "serious treatment" of the subject would not be believable, and thought that some of its most salient points would be fodder for comedy. Kubrick's longtime producer and friend, James B. Harris, thought the film should be serious, and the two parted ways, amicably, over this disagreement. Kubrick and George then reworked the script as a satire in which the plot of Red Alert was situated as a film-within-a-film made by an alien intelligence, but this idea was also abandoned, and Kubrick decided to make the film as "an outrageous black comedy". Just before filming began, Kubrick hired journalist and satirical author Terry Southern to transform the script into its final form, a black comedy, loaded with sexual innuendo, becoming a film which showed Kubrick's talents as a "unique kind of absurdist" according to the film scholar Abrams. Southern made major contributions to the final script, and was co-credited (above George) in the film's opening titles; his perceived role in the writing later led to a public rift between Kubrick and George, who subsequently complained in a letter to Life magazine that Southern's intense but relatively brief involvement with the project was being given undue prominence in the media, while his own role as the author of the film's source novel, and his ten-month stint as the script's co-writer, were being downplayed – a perception Kubrick evidently did little to address.

Kubrick found that Dr. Strangelove, a $2 million production which employed what became the "first important visual effects crew in the world", would be impossible to make in the U.S. for various technical and political reasons, forcing him to move production to England. It was shot in 15 weeks, ending in April 1963, after which Kubrick spent eight months editing it. Peter Sellers played three different roles in the film. (Note: Footage of Sellers playing four different roles was shot by Kubrick: "an RAF captain on secondment to Burpelson Air Force Base as adjutant to Sterling Hayden's crazed General Ripper; the inept President of the United States; his sinister German security adviser; and the Texan pilot of the rogue B52 bomber", but the scene with him as a Texan pilot was excluded from the final version.)

The film stirred up considerable controversy and mixed opinions. The New York Times film critic Bosley Crowther worried that it was a "discredit and even contempt for our whole defense establishment ... the most shattering sick joke I've ever come across", while Robert Brustein of Out of This World called it a "juvenalian satire". Kubrick responded to the criticism, stating: "A satirist is someone who has a very skeptical view of human nature, but who still has the optimism to make some sort of a joke out of it. However brutal that joke might be." Today, the film is considered to be one of the sharpest comedy films ever made, and holds a near-perfect 98% rating on Rotten Tomatoes based on 91 reviews as of November 2020. It was named the 39th-greatest American film and third-greatest American comedy film of all time by the American Film Institute, and in 2010, it was named the sixth-best comedy film of all time by The Guardian.

=== Science fiction (1965–1971) ===
==== 2001: A Space Odyssey ====
Kubrick spent five years developing 2001: A Space Odyssey (1968), having been highly impressed with science fiction writer Arthur C. Clarke's novel Childhood's End. After meeting Clarke in New York City in April 1964, Kubrick made the suggestion to work on his 1948 short story "The Sentinel", in which a monolith found on the Moon alerts aliens of mankind. That year, Clarke began writing the novel 2001: A Space Odyssey and collaborated with Kubrick on a screenplay. The film's theme, the birthing of one intelligence by another, is developed in two parallel intersecting stories on two different time scales. One depicts evolutionary transitions between various stages of man, from ape to "star child", as man is reborn into a new existence, each step shepherded by an enigmatic alien intelligence seen only in its artifacts: a series of seemingly indestructible eons-old black monoliths. In space, the enemy is a supercomputer known as HAL who runs the spaceship, a character which novelist Clancy Sigal described as being "far, far more human, more humorous and conceivably decent than anything else that may emerge from this far-seeing enterprise". (Note: Several commentators have speculated that HAL is a slur on IBM, with the letters alphabetically falling before it, and point out that Kubrick inspected the IBM 7090 during Dr Strangelove. Both Kubrick and Clarke denied this, and insist that HAL means "Heuristically Programmed Algorithmic Computer".)

Kubrick intensively researched for the film, paying particular attention to detail in what the future might look like. He was granted permission by NASA to observe the spacecraft being used in the Ranger 9 mission for accuracy. Filming commenced on December 29, 1965, with the excavation of the monolith on the moon, and footage was shot in the Namib desert in early 1967. The special effects team continued working until the end of the year to complete the film, taking the cost to $10.5 million. 2001: A Space Odyssey was conceived as a Cinerama spectacle and was photographed in Super Panavision 70, giving the viewer a "dazzling mix of imagination and science" through ground-breaking effects, which earned Kubrick his only personal Oscar, an Academy Award for Visual Effects. (Note: Biographer John Baxter quotes Ken Adam as saying that Kubrick was not responsible for most of the effects, and that Wally Veevers was the man behind about 85% of them in film. Baxter notes that none of the film's technical team resented Kubrick taking sole credit, as "it was Kubrick's vision which appeared on the screen".) Kubrick said of the concept of the film in an interview with Rolling Stone: "On the deepest psychological level, the film's plot symbolized the search for God, and finally postulates what is little less than a scientific definition of God. The film revolves around this metaphysical conception, and the realistic hardware and the documentary feelings about everything were necessary in order to undermine your built-in resistance to the poetical concept".

Upon release in 1968, 2001: A Space Odyssey was not an immediate hit among critics, who faulted its lack of dialog, slow pacing, and seemingly impenetrable storyline. The film appeared to defy genre convention, and was clearly different from any of Kubrick's earlier works. Kubrick was particularly outraged by a scathing review from Pauline Kael, who called it "the biggest amateur movie of them all", with Kubrick doing "really every dumb thing he ever wanted to do". Despite mixed contemporary critical reviews, 2001 gradually gained popularity and earned $31 million worldwide by the end of 1972. (Note: This made the film one of the five most successful MGM films at the time along with Gone With the Wind (1939), The Wizard of Oz (1939), and Doctor Zhivago (1965).) Today, it is widely considered to be one of the greatest and most influential films ever made. Baxter describes the film as "one of the most admired and discussed creations in the history of cinema", and Steven Spielberg has referred to it as "the big bang of his film making generation". For biographer Vincent LoBrutto it "positioned Stanley Kubrick as a pure artist ranked among the masters of cinema". The film marked Kubrick's first use of classical music. Roger Ebert writes:

Although Kubrick originally commissioned an original score from Alex North, he used classical recordings as a temporary track while editing the film, and they worked so well that he kept them. This was a crucial decision. North's score, which is available on a recording, is a good job of film composition, but would have been wrong for 2001 because, like all scores, it attempts to underline the action – to give us emotional cues. The classical music chosen by Kubrick exists outside the action. It uplifts. It wants to be sublime; it brings a seriousness and transcendence to the visuals.

==== A Clockwork Orange ====
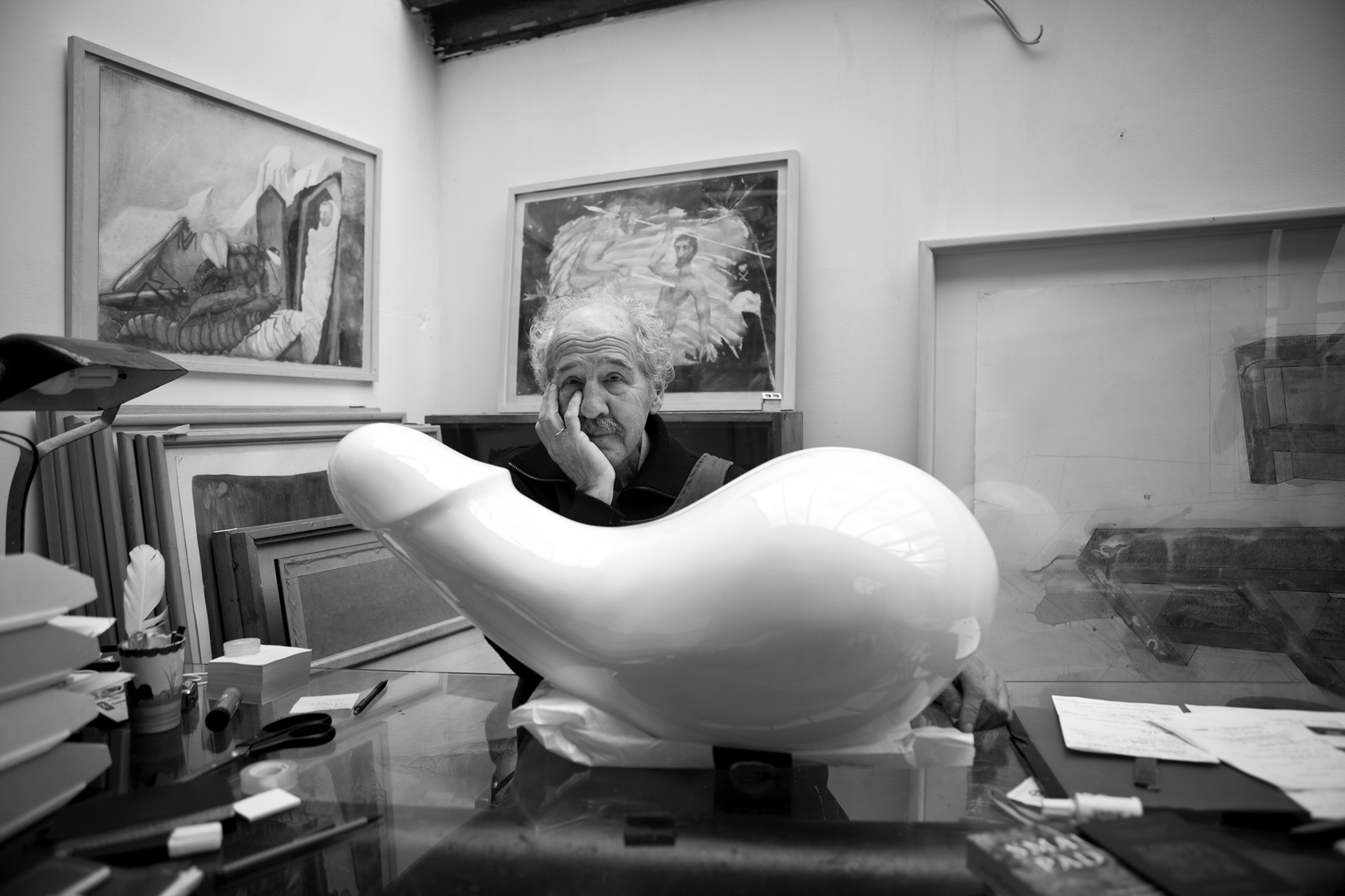
An example of the erotica from A Clockwork Orange (1971)

After completing 2001: A Space Odyssey, Kubrick searched for a project that he could film quickly on a more modest budget. He settled on A Clockwork Orange (1971) at the end of 1969, an exploration of violence and experimental rehabilitation by law enforcement authorities, based around the character of Alex (portrayed by Malcolm McDowell). Kubrick had received a copy of Anthony Burgess's novel of the same name from Terry Southern while they were working on Dr. Strangelove, but had rejected it on the grounds that Nadsat, (Note: The name is derived from the Russian suffix for "teen") a street language for young teenagers, was too difficult to comprehend. The decision to make a film about the degeneration of youth reflected contemporary concerns in 1969; the New Hollywood movement was creating a great number of films that depicted the sexuality and rebelliousness of young people. A Clockwork Orange was shot over 1970–1971 on a budget of £2 million. Kubrick abandoned his use of CinemaScope in filming, deciding that the 1.66:1 widescreen format was, in the words of Baxter, an "acceptable compromise between spectacle and intimacy", and favored his "rigorously symmetrical framing", which "increased the beauty of his compositions". The film heavily features "pop erotica" of the period, including a large white plastic set of male genitals, decor which Kubrick had intended to give it a "slightly futuristic" look. McDowell's role in Lindsay Anderson's if.... (1968) was crucial to his casting as Alex, (Note: Kubrick had been impressed with his ability to "shift from schoolboy innocence to insolence and, if needed, violence".) and Kubrick professed that he probably would not have made the film if McDowell had been unavailable. The film marked Kubrick's first collaboration with Wendy Carlos, who provided electronic renditions of Henry Purcell's Music for the Funeral of Queen Mary and Beethoven's "Ode to Joy".

Because of its depiction of teenage violence, A Clockwork Orange became one of the most controversial films of its time. It received an X rating, or certificate, in both the UK and US, on its release, though many critics saw much of the violence as satirical. Kubrick personally pulled the film from release in the UK after receiving death threats following a series of copycat crimes based on the film; it was thus completely unavailable legally in the UK until after Kubrick's death, and not re-released until 2000. (Note: Despite this, Kubrick disagreed with many of the scathing press reports in British media in the early 1970s that the film could transform a person into a criminal, and argued that "violent crime is invariably committed by people with a long record of anti-social behavior".) John Trevelyan, the censor of the film, personally considered A Clockwork Orange to be "perhaps the most brilliant piece of cinematic art I've ever seen," and believed it to present an "intellectual argument rather than a sadistic spectacle" in its depiction of violence, but acknowledged that many would not agree. Negative media hype over the film notwithstanding, A Clockwork Orange received four Academy Award nominations, for Best Picture, Best Director, Best Screenplay and Best Editing, and was named by the New York Film Critics Circle as the Best Film of 1971. After William Friedkin won Best Director for The French Connection that year, he told the press: "Speaking personally, I think Stanley Kubrick is the best American film-maker of the year. In fact, not just this year, but the best, period."

=== Period and horror filming (1972–1980) ===
==== Barry Lyndon ====
Barry Lyndon (1975) is an adaptation of William Makepeace Thackeray's The Luck of Barry Lyndon, a picaresque novel about the adventures of an 18th-century Irish rogue and social climber. John Calley of Warner Bros. agreed in 1972 to invest $2.5 million into the film, on condition that Kubrick approach major Hollywood stars, to ensure success. Like previous films, Kubrick and his art department conducted an enormous amount of research on the 18th century. (Note: Kubrick told Ciment, "I created a picture file of thousands of drawings and paintings for every type of reference that we could have wanted. I think I destroyed every art book you could buy in a bookshop.") The film was shot on location in Ireland, beginning in the autumn of 1973, at a cost of $11 million. The production was problematic from the start, plagued with heavy rain and political strife involving Northern Ireland at the time. After Kubrick received death threats from the IRA in 1974 due to the shooting scenes with English soldiers, he fled Ireland with his family on a ferry from Dún Laoghaire under an assumed identity and resumed filming in England.

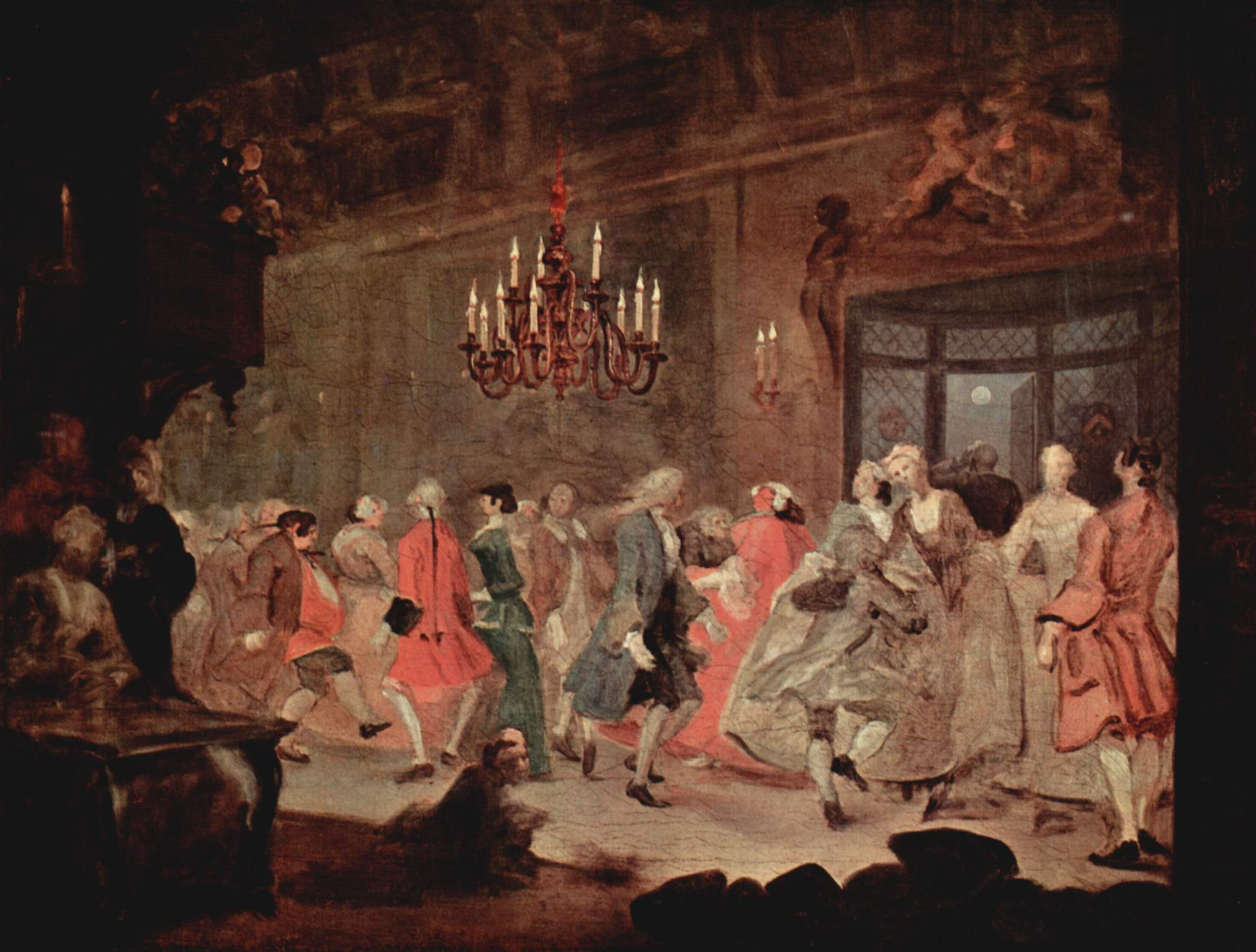
William Hogarth's The Country Dance (c. 1745) illustrates the type of interior scene that Kubrick sought to emulate with Barry Lyndon.

Baxter notes that Barry Lyndon was the film which made Kubrick notorious for paying scrupulous attention to detail, often demanding twenty or thirty retakes of the same scene. Often considered to be his most authentic-looking picture, the cinematography and lighting techniques were highly innovative. Interior scenes were shot with a specially adapted high-speed Zeiss camera lens originally developed for NASA to be used in satellite photography. The lenses allowed many scenes to be lit only with candlelight, creating two-dimensional, diffused-light images reminiscent of 18th-century paintings. Cinematographer Allen Daviau states that the method gives the audience a way of seeing the characters and scenes as they would have been seen by people at the time. Many of the fight scenes were shot with a hand-held camera to produce a "sense of documentary realism and immediacy".

Barry Lyndon found a great audience in France, but was a box office failure, grossing just $9.5 million in the American market, not even close to the $30 million Warner Bros. needed to generate a profit. The pace and length of Barry Lyndon at three hours put off many American critics and audiences, but the film was nominated for seven Academy Awards and won four, more than any other Kubrick film. As with most of Kubrick's films, Barry Lyndon's reputation has grown through the years and it is now considered to be one of his best. Numerous polls, such as The Village Voice (1999), Sight & Sound (2002), and Time (2005), have rated it as one of the greatest films ever made. Ebert referred to it as "one of the most beautiful films ever made ... certainly in every frame a Kubrick film: technically awesome, emotionally distant, remorseless in its doubt of human goodness".

==== The Shining ====
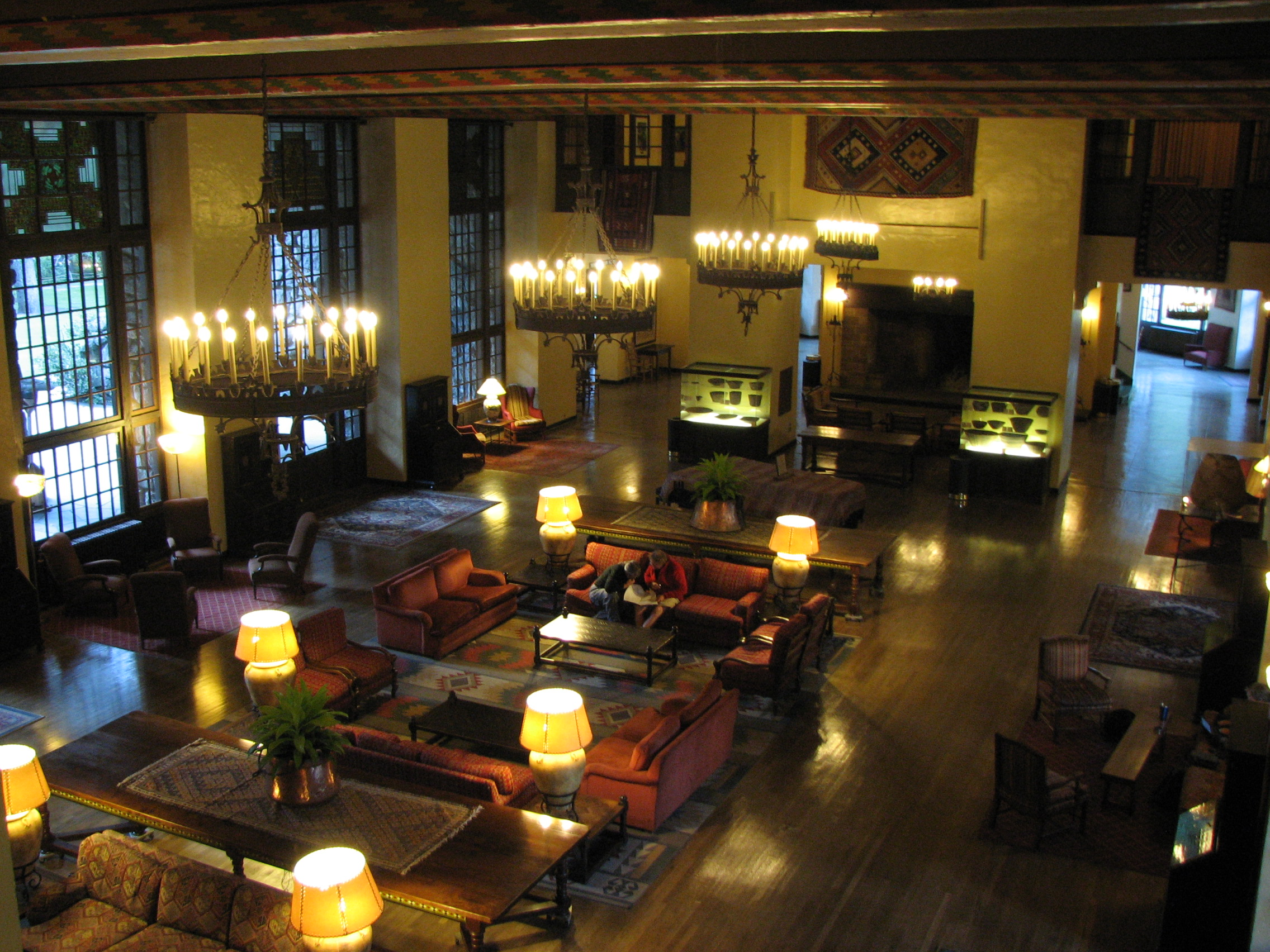
Several of the interiors of Ahwahnee Hotel were used as templates for the sets of the Overlook Hotel.

The Shining, released in 1980, was adapted from the novel of the same name by Stephen King. The film stars Jack Nicholson as a writer who takes a job as a winter caretaker of an isolated hotel. He spends the winter there with his wife, played by Shelley Duvall, and their young son, who displays paranormal abilities. They confront both Jack's descent into madness and apparent supernatural horrors in the hotel. Kubrick gave his actors freedom to extend the script and even improvise on occasion. Kubrick often demanded 70 or 80 retakes of the same scene. Kubrick made extensive use of the newly invented Steadicam, a weight-balanced camera support, which allowed for smooth hand-held camera movement in scenes where a conventional camera track was impractical. According to Garrett Brown, Steadicam's inventor, it was the first picture to use its full potential. The Shining was not the only horror film to which Kubrick had been linked; he had turned down the directing of both The Exorcist (1973) and Exorcist II: The Heretic (1977), despite saying in 1966 to a friend that he had long desired to "make the world's scariest movie, involving a series of episodes that would play upon the nightmare fears of the audience".

Five days after release on May 23, 1980, Kubrick ordered the deletion of a final scene, in which the hotel manager Ullman (Barry Nelson) visits Wendy (Shelley Duvall) in hospital, believing it unnecessary after witnessing the audience excitement in cinemas at the film's climax. The Shining opened to strong box office takings, earning $1 million on the first weekend. The original critical response was mixed, and King detested the film and disliked Kubrick. The Shining is now considered to be a horror classic, and the American Film Institute ranked it as the 29th greatest thriller film of all time in 2001.

=== Later work and final years (1981–1999) ===
==== Full Metal Jacket ====
Kubrick met author Michael Herr through mutual friend David Cornwell (novelist John le Carré) in 1980, and became interested in his book Dispatches, about the Vietnam War. Kubrick was also intrigued by Gustav Hasford's Vietnam War novel The Short-Timers. With the vision in mind to shoot what would become Full Metal Jacket (1987), Kubrick began working with both Herr and Hasford separately on a script. He eventually found Hasford's novel to be "brutally honest" and decided to shoot a film which closely follows the novel. The film was shot at a cost of $17 million between August 1985 and September 1986, later than scheduled as Kubrick shut down production for five months following a near-fatal accident with a jeep involving R. Lee Ermey. A derelict gasworks in Beckton in the London Docklands area posed as the ruined city of Huế, which makes the film visually very different from other Vietnam War films. Around 200 palm trees were imported by road from North Africa, at a cost of £1000 a tree, and thousands of plastic plants were ordered from Hong Kong to provide foliage for the film. Kubrick explained he made the film look realistic by using natural light, and achieved a "newsreel effect" by making the Steadicam shots less steady, which reviewers and commentators thought contributed to the bleakness and seriousness of the film.

According to critic Michel Ciment, the film contained some of Kubrick's trademark characteristics, such as ironic music, portrayals of men being dehumanized, and attention to extreme detail to achieve realism. The film opened strongly in June 1987, taking over $30 million in the first 50 days, but critically it was overshadowed by the success of Oliver Stone's Platoon, released a year earlier. Co-star Matthew Modine stated one of Kubrick's favorite reviews read: "The first half of FMJ is brilliant. Then the film degenerates into a masterpiece." Ebert was not particularly impressed with it, awarding it 2.5 out of 4. He concluded: "Stanley Kubrick's Full Metal Jacket is more like a book of short stories than a novel", a "strangely shapeless film from the man whose work usually imposes a ferociously consistent vision on his material".

==== Eyes Wide Shut ====
Kubrick's final film was Eyes Wide Shut (1999), starring Tom Cruise and Nicole Kidman as a Manhattan couple on a sexual odyssey. The story is based on Arthur Schnitzler's 1926 Freudian novella Traumnovelle (Dream Story). Kubrick was almost 70, but worked relentlessly for 15 months to get the film out by its planned release date of July 16, 1999. He commenced a script with Frederic Raphael, and worked 18 hours a day, while maintaining complete confidentiality about the film.

Eyes Wide Shut, like Lolita and A Clockwork Orange, faced censorship before release. Kubrick sent an unfinished preview copy to the stars and producers a few months before release, but his sudden death on March 7, 1999, came a few days after he finished editing. He never saw the final version, but he did see the preview and had reportedly told Warner executive Julian Senior that it was his "best film ever". At the time, critical opinion of the film was mixed. Ebert awarded it 3.5 out of 4 stars, comparing the structure to a thriller and writing that it is "like an erotic daydream about chances missed and opportunities avoided", and thought that Kubrick's use of lighting at Christmas made the film "all a little garish, like an urban sideshow". Stephen Hunter of The Washington Post disliked the film, writing that it "is actually sad, rather than bad. It feels creaky, ancient, hopelessly out of touch, infatuated with the hot taboos of his youth and unable to connect with that twisty thing contemporary sexuality has become."

=== Unfinished and unrealized projects ===
==== A.I. Artificial Intelligence ====
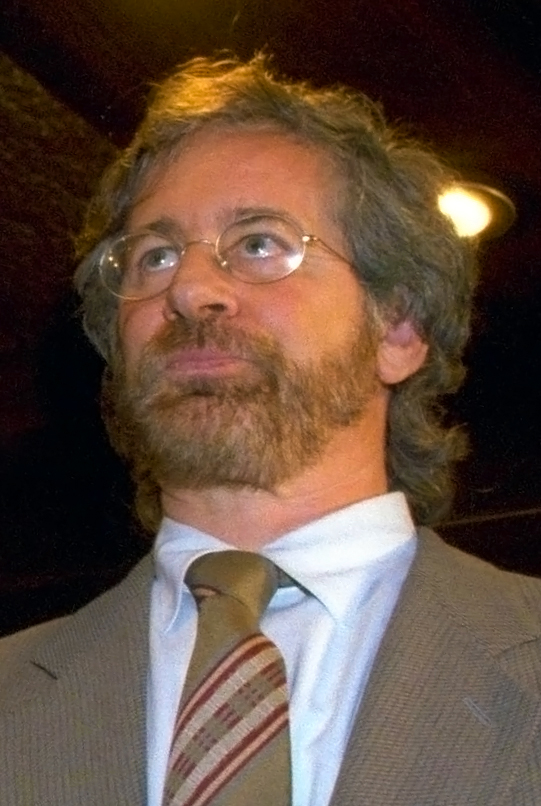
Steven Spielberg (pictured in 1994), whom Kubrick approached in 1995 to direct the 2001 film A.I. Artificial Intelligence

Throughout the 1980s and early 1990s, Kubrick collaborated with Brian Aldiss on expanding his short story "Supertoys Last All Summer Long" into a film. It was a futuristic fairy tale about a robot that resembles a child, and his efforts to become a 'real boy' in a manner similar to Pinocchio. Kubrick approached Steven Spielberg in 1995 with the script. Kubrick reportedly held long telephone discussions with Spielberg regarding the film. Following Kubrick's sudden death in 1999, Spielberg took the notes left by Kubrick and his writers and composed a new screenplay based on an earlier 90-page story treatment by Ian Watson written under Kubrick's supervision. In association with what remained of Kubrick's production unit, he directed the film A.I. Artificial Intelligence (2001), produced by Kubrick's longtime producer (and brother-in-law) Jan Harlan. Sets, costumes, and art direction were based on the works of conceptual artist Chris Baker, who had also done much of his work under Kubrick's supervision.

Spielberg said he felt "inhibited to honor" Kubrick, and followed Kubrick's visual schema with as much fidelity as he could. Spielberg, who once referred to Kubrick as "the greatest master I ever served", admitted, "I felt like I was being coached by a ghost." The film contains a posthumous production credit for Kubrick at the beginning and the brief dedication "For Stanley Kubrick" at the end. John Williams's score contains many allusions to pieces heard in other Kubrick films.

==== Napoleon ====
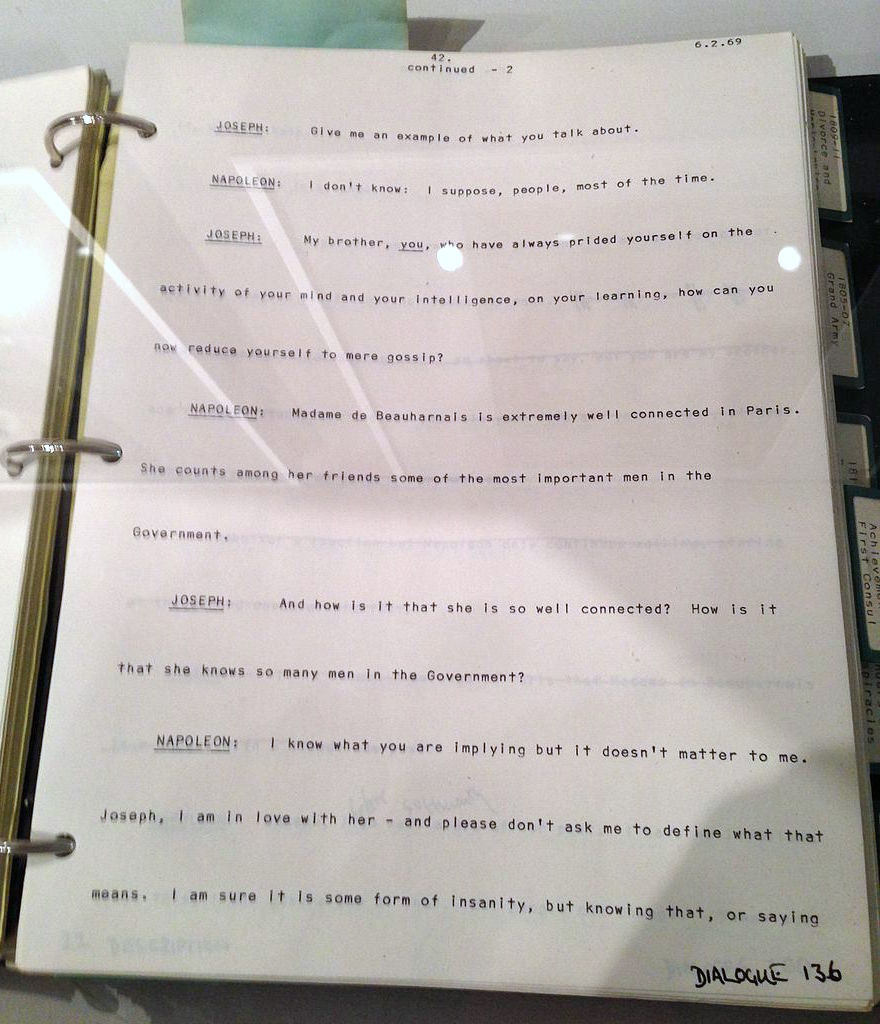
The script from Kubrick's unrealized project Napoleon

Following 2001: A Space Odyssey, Kubrick planned to make a film about Napoleon. Fascinated by the French leader's life and "self-destruction", Kubrick spent a great deal of time planning the film's development and conducted about two years of research into Napoleon's life, reading several hundred books and gaining access to his personal memoirs and commentaries. He tried to see every film about Napoleon and found none of them appealing, including Abel Gance's 1927 film which is generally considered a masterpiece, but for Kubrick, was a "really terrible" movie. LoBrutto states that Napoleon was an ideal subject for Kubrick, embracing Kubrick's "passion for control, power, obsession, strategy, and the military", while Napoleon's psychological intensity and depth, logistical genius and war, sex, and the evil nature of man were all ingredients which deeply appealed to Kubrick.

Kubrick drafted a screenplay in 1961, and envisaged making a "grandiose" epic, with up to 40,000 infantry and 10,000 cavalry. He intended hiring the armed forces of an entire country to make the film, as he considered Napoleonic battles to be "so beautiful, like vast lethal ballets", with an "aesthetic brilliance that doesn't require a military mind to appreciate". He wanted them replicated as authentically as possible on screen. Kubrick sent research teams to scout for locations across Europe, and commissioned screenwriter and director Andrew Birkin to the Isle of Elba, Austerlitz, and Waterloo, taking thousands of pictures. Kubrick approached numerous stars to play leading roles, including Audrey Hepburn for Empress Josephine, a part which she could not accept due to semiretirement. British actors David Hemmings and Ian Holm were considered for the lead role of Napoleon, before Jack Nicholson was cast. The film was well into preproduction and ready to begin filming in 1969 when MGM canceled the project. Numerous reasons have been cited for the abandonment of the project, including its projected cost, a change of ownership at MGM, and the poor reception that the 1970 Soviet film about Napoleon, Waterloo, received. In 2011, Taschen published the book Stanley Kubrick's Napoleon: The Greatest Movie Never Made, a large volume compilation of literature and source documents from Kubrick. In March 2013, Steven Spielberg, who previously collaborated with Kubrick on A.I. Artificial Intelligence and is a passionate admirer of his work, announced that he would be developing Napoleon as a TV miniseries based on Kubrick's original screenplay.

==== Other projects ====
In the 1950s, Kubrick and Harris developed a sitcom starring Ernie Kovacs and a film adaption of the book I Stole $16,000,000, but nothing came of them. Tony Frewin, an assistant who worked with the director for a long period, revealed in a 2013 Atlantic article: "[Kubrick] was limitlessly interested in anything to do with Nazis and desperately wanted to make a film on the subject." Kubrick had intended to make a film about Dietrich Schulz-Köhn, a Nazi officer who used the pen name "Dr. Jazz" to write reviews of German music scenes during the Nazi era. A screenplay was never completed and Kubrick's adaptation was never initiated. The unfinished Aryan Papers, based on Louis Begley's debut novel Wartime Lies, was a factor in the abandonment of the project. Work on Aryan Papers depressed Kubrick enormously, and he eventually decided that Steven Spielberg's Schindler's List (1993) covered much of the same material.

According to biographer John Baxter, Kubrick had shown an interest in directing a pornographic film based on a satirical novel written by Terry Southern, titled Blue Movie. Baxter claims that Kubrick concluded he did not have the patience or temperament to become involved in the porn industry, and Southern stated that Kubrick was "too ultra conservative" towards sexuality to have gone ahead with it. Kubrick was unable to direct a film of Umberto Eco's Foucault's Pendulum as Eco had given his publisher instructions to never sell the film rights to any of his books after his dissatisfaction with the film version of The Name of the Rose. Also, when the film rights to Tolkien's The Lord of the Rings were sold to United Artists, the Beatles approached Kubrick to direct them in a film adaptation, but Kubrick was unwilling to produce a film based on a very popular book.

== Career influences ==
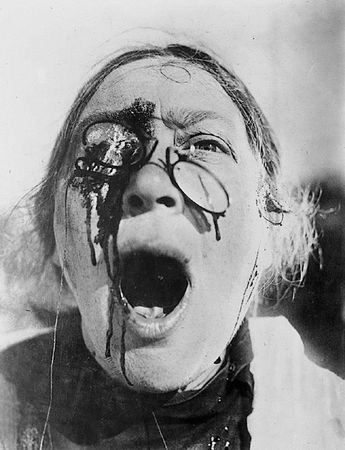
As a young man, Kubrick was fascinated by the films of Sergei Eisenstein and would watch films like Battleship Potemkin (1925) (pictured) frequently.

Anyone who has ever been privileged to direct a film knows that, although it can be like trying to write War and Peace in a bumper car at an amusement park, when you finally get it right, there are not many joys in life that can equal the feeling.

— Stanley Kubrick, accepting the D. W. Griffith Award

As a young man, Kubrick was fascinated by the films of Soviet filmmakers such as Sergei Eisenstein and Vsevolod Pudovkin. Kubrick read Pudovkin's seminal theoretical work, Film Technique, which argues that editing makes film a unique art form, and it needs to be employed to manipulate the medium to its fullest. Kubrick recommended this work to others for many years. Thomas Nelson describes this book as "the greatest influence of any single written work on the evolution of [Kubrick's] private aesthetics". Kubrick also found the ideas of Konstantin Stanislavski to be essential to his understanding the basics of directing.

Kubrick's family and many critics felt that his Jewish ancestry may have contributed to his worldview and aspects of his films. After his death, his daughter and wife stated that he was not religious, but "did not deny his Jewishness, not at all". His daughter noted that he wanted to make a film about the Holocaust, the Aryan Papers, having spent years researching the subject. Most of Kubrick's friends and early photography and film collaborators were Jewish, and his first two marriages were to daughters of recent Jewish immigrants from Europe. British screenwriter Frederic Raphael, who worked closely with Kubrick in his final years, declared that it was "absurd to try to understand Stanley Kubrick without reckoning on Jewishness as a fundamental aspect of his mentality". Walker notes that Kubrick was influenced by the tracking and "fluid camera" styles of director Max Ophüls, and used them in many of his films, including Paths of Glory and 2001: A Space Odyssey. He once named Ophüls' Le Plaisir (1952) as his favorite film. Geoffrey Cocks believes that Kubrick was also influenced by Ophüls' stories of thwarted love and a preoccupation with predatory men, while Herr notes that Kubrick was deeply inspired by G. W. Pabst. Film historian/critic Robert Kolker sees the influence of Orson Welles' moving camera shots on Kubrick's style. LoBrutto notes that Kubrick identified with Welles and that this influenced the making of The Killing, with its "multiple points of view, extreme angles, and deep focus".

Kubrick admired the work of Ingmar Bergman and expressed it in a personal letter:

Your vision of life has moved me deeply, much more deeply than I have ever been moved by any films. I believe you are the greatest film-maker at work today [...], unsurpassed by anyone in the creation of mood and atmosphere, the subtlety of performance, the avoidance of the obvious, the truthfulness and completeness of characterization. To this one must also add everything else that goes into the making of a film; [...] and I shall look forward with eagerness to each of your films.

When the American magazine Cinema asked Kubrick in 1963 to name his favorite films, he listed Federico Fellini's I Vitelloni as first in his Top 10 list.

== Directing techniques ==
=== Philosophy ===
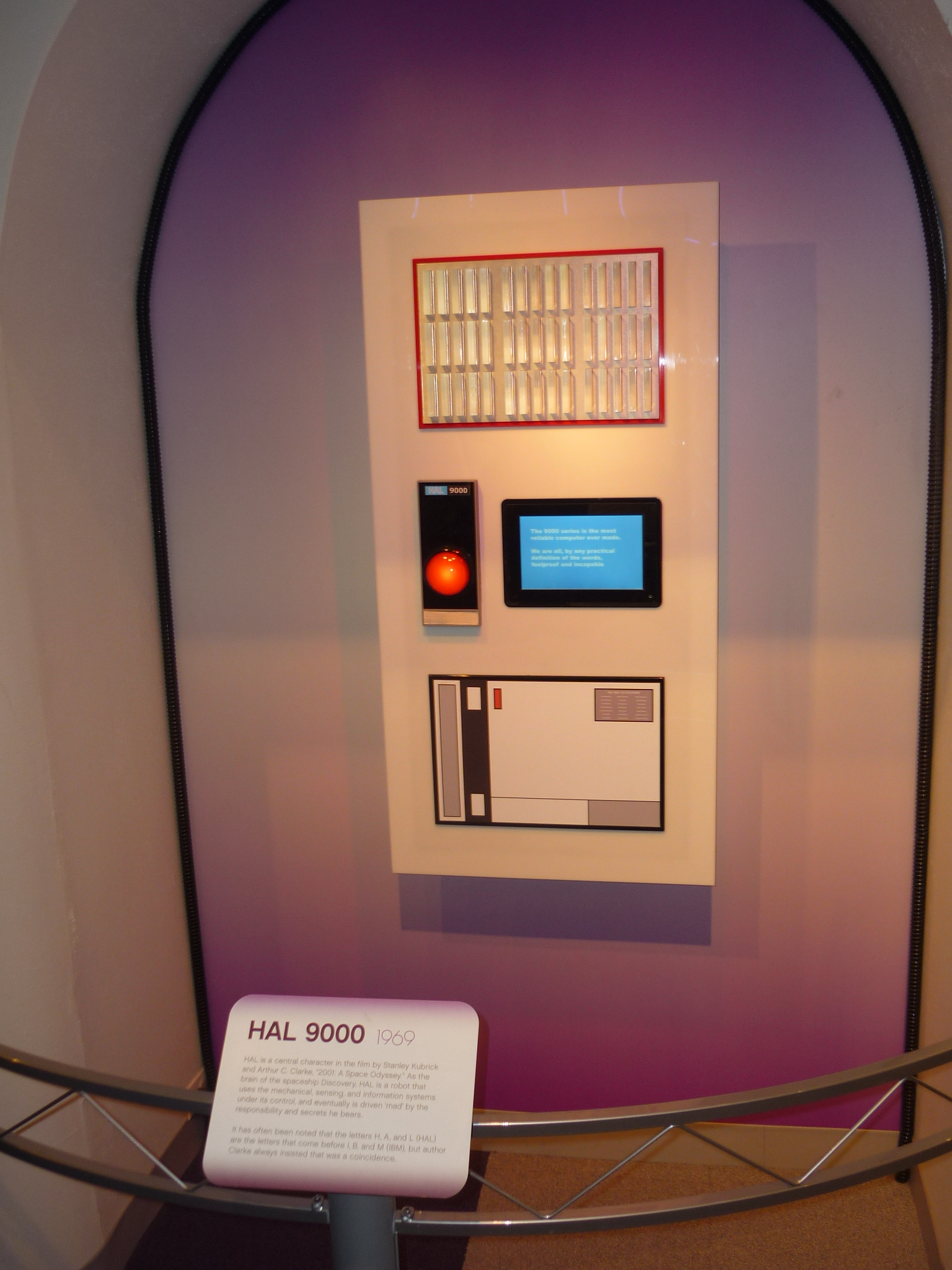
HAL 9000, the computer from 2001: A Space Odyssey

Kubrick's films typically involve expressions of an inner struggle, examined from different perspectives. He was very careful not to present his own views of the meaning of his films and to leave them open to interpretation. He explained in a 1960 interview with Robert Emmett Ginna Jr.:

One of the things I always find extremely difficult, when a picture's finished, is when a writer or a film reviewer asks, 'Now, what is it that you were trying to say in that picture?' And without being thought too presumptuous for using this analogy, I like to remember what T. S. Eliot said to someone who had asked him—I believe it was The Waste Land—what he meant by the poem. He replied, 'I meant what I said.' If I could have said it any differently, I would have.

Kubrick likened the understanding of his films to popular music, in that whatever the background or intellect of the individual, a Beatles record, for instance, can be appreciated both by the Alabama truck driver and the young Cambridge intellectual, because their "emotions and subconscious are far more similar than their intellects". He believed that the subconscious emotional reaction experienced by audiences was far more powerful in the film medium than in any other traditional verbal form, and this was one of the reasons why he often relied on long periods in his films without dialogue, placing emphasis on images and sound. In a 1975 Time magazine interview, Kubrick further stated: "The essence of a dramatic form is to let an idea come over people without it being plainly stated. When you say something directly, it is simply not as potent as it is when you allow people to discover it for themselves." He also said: "Realism is probably the best way to dramatize argument and ideas. Fantasy may deal best with themes which lie primarily in the unconscious".

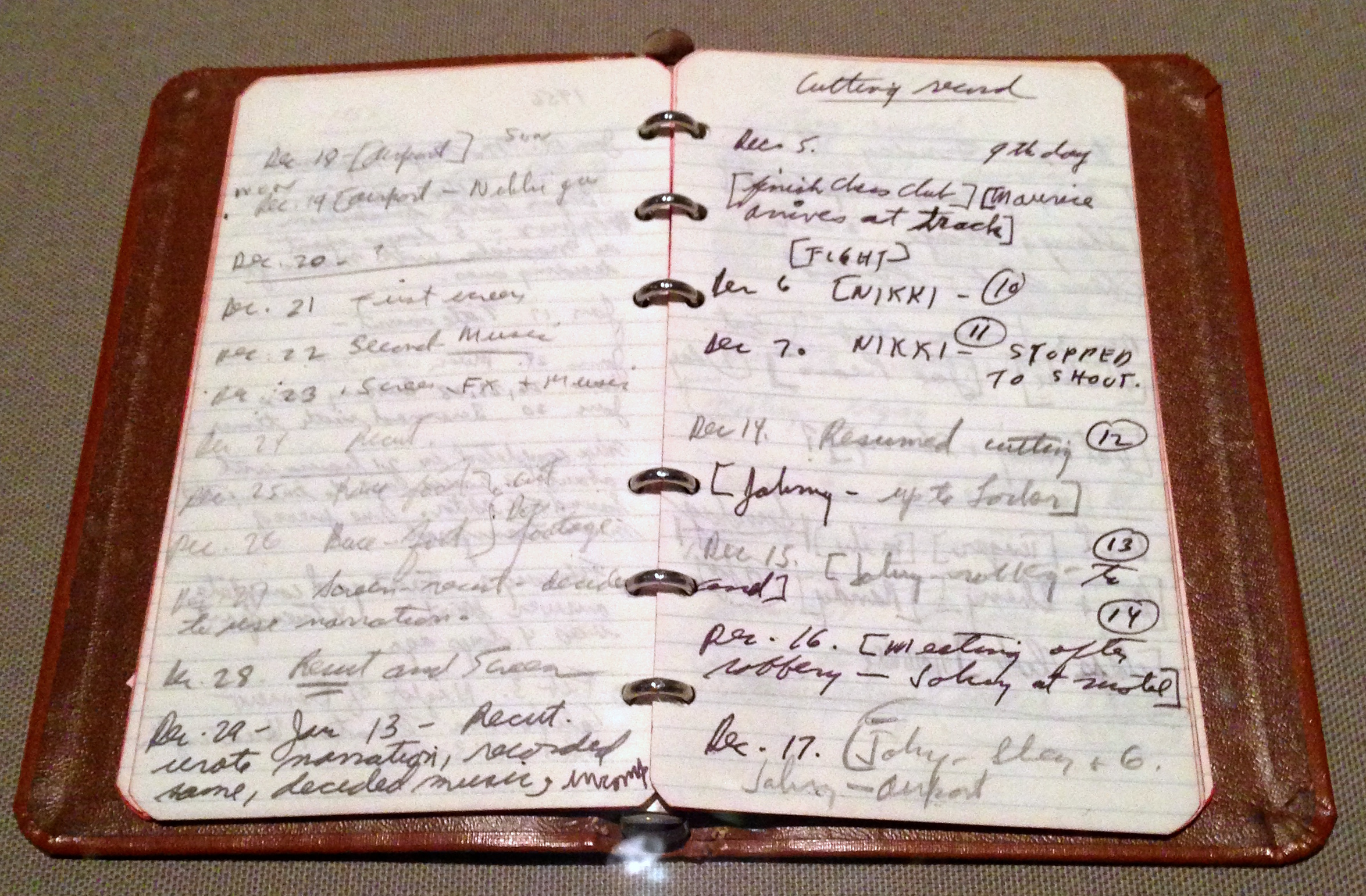
Kubrick's production notes from The Killing

Diane Johnson, who co-wrote the screenplay for The Shining with Kubrick, notes that he "always said that it was better to adapt a book rather than write an original screenplay, and that you should choose a work that isn't a masterpiece so you can improve on it." He always made films which would "appeal to every sort of viewer, whatever their expectation of film". According to his co-producer Jan Harlan, Kubrick mostly "wanted to make films about things that mattered, that not only had form, but substance". Kubrick believed that audiences quite often were attracted to "enigmas and allegories" and did not like films in which everything was spelled out clearly.

Sexuality in Kubrick's films is usually depicted outside matrimonial relationships in hostile situations. Baxter states that Kubrick's works explore the "furtive and violent side alleys of the sexual experience: voyeurism, domination, bondage and rape". He further points out that films like A Clockwork Orange are "powerfully homoerotic"; the film is thought to have been strongly influenced by Kubrick's many viewings of Matsumoto Toshio's 1969 landmark in queer cinema, Funeral Parade of Roses. Film critic Adrian Turner notes that Kubrick's films appear to be "preoccupied with questions of universal and inherited evil", and Malcolm McDowell referred to his humor as "black as coal", questioning his outlook on humanity. A few of his pictures were obvious satires and black comedies, such as Lolita and Dr. Strangelove; many of his other films also contained less visible elements of satire or irony. His films are unpredictable, examining "the duality and contradictions that exist in all of us". Ciment notes how Kubrick often tried to confound audience expectations by establishing radically different moods from one film to the next, remarking that he was almost "obsessed with contradicting himself, with making each work a critique of the previous one". Kubrick stated that "there is no deliberate pattern to the stories that I have chosen to make into films. About the only factor at work each time is that I try not to repeat myself". As a result, Kubrick was often misunderstood by critics, and only once did he have unanimously positive reviews upon the release of a film—for Paths of Glory.

=== Writing and staging scenes ===
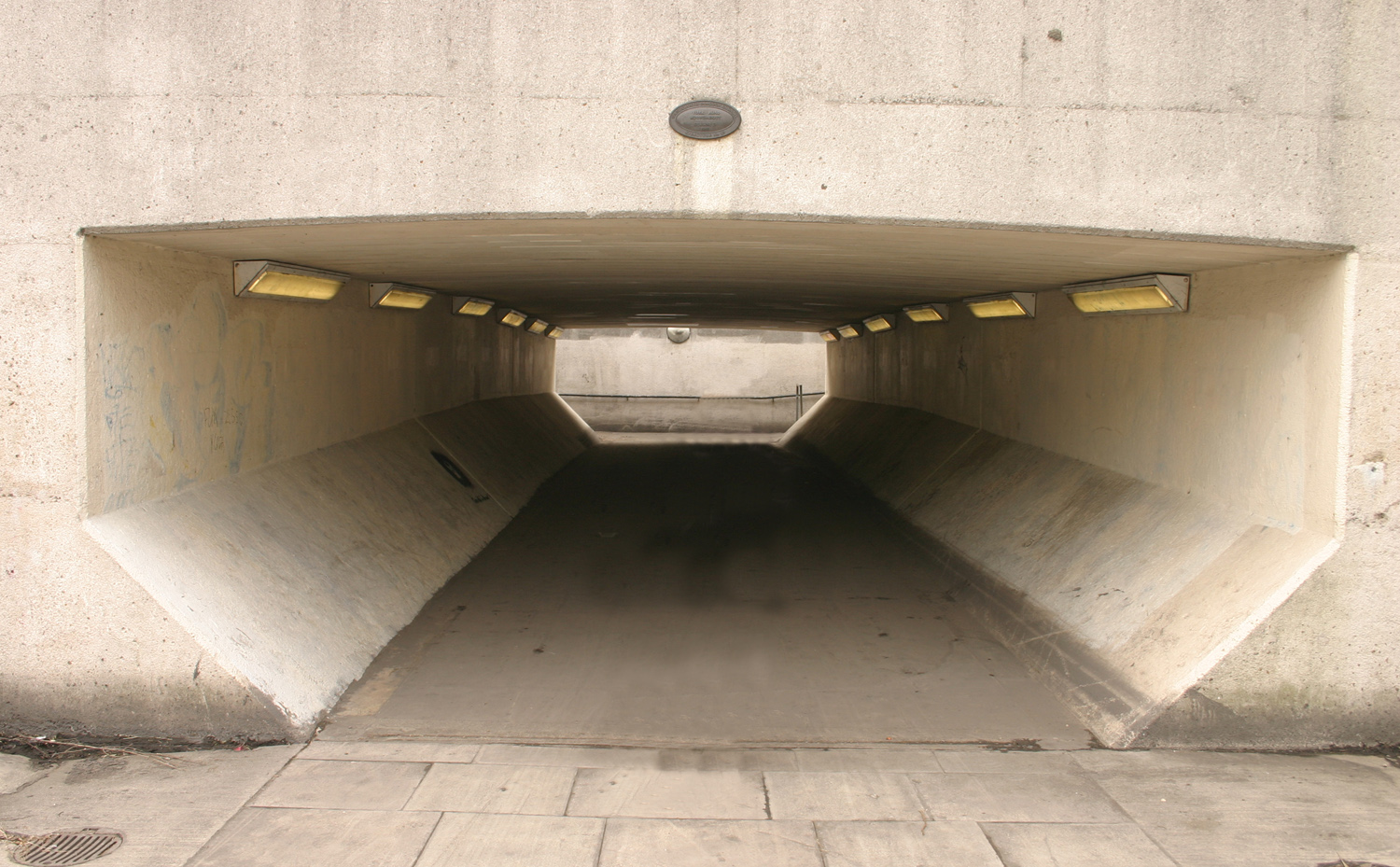
Underpass used in A Clockwork Orange (Wandsworth Bridge Roundabout, London)

Film author Patrick Webster considers Kubrick's methods of developing scenes to fit with the classical auteur theory of directing, allowing collaboration and improvisation with the actors during filming. Malcolm McDowell recalled Kubrick's collaborative emphasis and his willingness to allow McDowell to improvise a scene, stating that "there was a script and we followed it, but when it didn't work he knew it, and we had to keep rehearsing endlessly until we were bored with it". Once Kubrick was confident in the overall staging of a scene, and felt the actors were prepared, he would then develop the visual aspects, including camera and lighting placement. Walker believes that Kubrick was one of "very few film directors competent to instruct their lighting photographers in the precise effect they want".

Gilbert Adair, writing in a review for Full Metal Jacket, commented that "Kubrick's approach to language has always been of a reductive and uncompromisingly deterministic nature. He appears to view it as the exclusive product of environmental conditioning, only very marginally influenced by concepts of subjectivity and interiority, by all whims, shades and modulations of personal expression". Johnson notes that although Kubrick was a "visual filmmaker", he also loved words and was like a writer in his approach, very sensitive to the story itself. Before shooting began, Kubrick tried to have the script as complete as possible, but still allowed himself enough space to make changes during the filming. Kubrick told Robert Emmett Ginna Jr.:

I think you have to view the entire problem of putting the story you want to tell up there on that light square. It begins with the selection of the property; it continues through the creation of the story, the sets, the costumes, the photography and the acting. And when the picture is shot, it's only partially finished. I think the cutting is just a continuation of directing a movie. I think the use of music effects, opticals and finally main titles are all part of telling the story. And I think the fragmentation of these jobs, by different people, is a very bad thing.

Kubrick also said: "I think that the best plot is no apparent plot. I like a slow start, the start that gets under the audience's skin and involves them so that they can appreciate grace notes and soft tones and don't have to be pounded over the head with plot points and suspense tools."

Posthumous analysis of his films often highlight a pervasive "misanthropy", an unsentimental style, and being less interested in the specific emotions or personality traits of his characters. Filmmaker Quentin Tarantino describes the manner in which Kubrick writes characters and films as "cold" and detached.

=== Directing style ===
They work with Stanley and go through hells that nothing in their careers could have prepared them for, they think they must have been mad to get involved, they think that they'd die before they would ever work with him again, that fixated maniac; and when it's all behind them and the profound fatigue of so much intensity has worn off, they'd do anything in the world to work for him again. For the rest of their professional lives they long to work with someone who cared the way Stanley did, someone they could learn from. They look for someone to respect the way they'd come to respect him, but they can never find anybody ... I've heard this story so many times.

— Michael Herr, screenwriter for Full Metal Jacket on actors working with Kubrick.

==== Multiple takes ====
Kubrick was notorious for filming far more takes than is common during feature production and his relentless approach often placed large demands on his actors. Jack Nicholson remarked that Kubrick would frequently require up to fifty takes of a scene before the director felt justice had been done to the material. Nicole Kidman explained that the dozens of takes he often required had the effect of suppressing an actor's conscious thoughts about technique, diffusing the concentration Kubrick said he could see in the eyes of an actor who was not yet performing at the peak of their ability and helping them to enter a "deeper place". Kubrick echoed this sentiment, saying, "[a]ctors are essentially emotion-producing instruments, and some are always tuned and ready while others will reach a fantastic pitch on one take and never equal it again, no matter how hard they try".

While Kubrick's high take ratio was considered by some critics to be irrational, he firmly believed that actors were at their best during filming, as opposed to in rehearsals, saying, "[w]hen you make a movie, it takes a few days just to get used to the crew, because it is like getting undressed in front of fifty people. Once you're accustomed to them, the presence of even one other person on set is discordant and tends to produce self-consciousness in the actors, and certainly in itself".

In 1987, when Kubrick was asked about his reputation for excessive takes by Rolling Stone, he replied that it was exaggerated but that when it was true, "[i]t happens when actors are unprepared. You cannot act without knowing dialogue. If actors have to think about the words, they can't work on the emotion. So you end up doing thirty takes of something. And still you can see the concentration in their eyes; they don't know their lines. So you just shoot it and shoot it and hope you can get something out of it in pieces." He likewise told biographer Michel Ciment:

[a]n actor can only do one thing at a time, and when he learned his lines only well enough to say them while he's thinking about them, he will always have trouble as soon as he has to work on the emotions of the scene or find camera marks. In a strong emotional scene, it is always best to be able to shoot in complete takes to allow the actor a continuity of emotion, and it is rare for most actors to reach their peak more than once or twice. There are, occasionally, scenes which benefit from extra takes, but even then, I'm not sure that the early takes aren't just glorified rehearsals with the adding adrenaline of film running through the camera.

Matthew Modine, who played Joker in Full Metal Jacket, echoes these assessments of even a world-renowned actor's delivery on a Kubrick film. In an oral history gathered by Peter Bogdanovich after the director's death Modine recalled:

I once asked [Kubrick] why he so often did a lot of takes. [...] And he talked about Jack Nicholson [saying] "Jack would come in during the blocking and he kind of fumbled through the lines. He'd be learning them while he was there. And then you'd start shooting and after take 3 or take 4 or take 5 you'd get the Jack Nicholson that everybody knows and most directors would be happy with. And then you'd go up to 10 or 15 and he'd be really awful and then he'd start to understand what the lines were, what the lines meant, and then he'd become unconscious about what he was saying. So by take 30 or take 40 the lines became something else.

==== Discussions with actors ====
On set, Kubrick devoted his personal breaks to lengthy discussions with his actors. Among those who valued his attention was Tony Curtis, star of Spartacus, who said Kubrick was his favorite director, adding, "his greatest effectiveness was his one-on-one relationship with actors." He added, "Kubrick had his own approach to film-making. He wanted to see the actor's faces. He didn't want cameras always in a wide shot twenty-five feet away, he wanted close-ups, he wanted to keep the camera moving." Similarly, Malcolm McDowell recalls the long discussions he had with Kubrick to help him develop his character in A Clockwork Orange, noting that on set he felt entirely uninhibited and free, which is what made Kubrick "such a great director". Kubrick also allowed actors at times to improvise and to "break the rules", particularly with Peter Sellers in Lolita, which became a turning point in his career as it allowed him to work creatively during the shooting, as opposed to the preproduction stage. During an interview, Ryan O'Neal recalled Kubrick's directing style: "God, he works you hard. He moves you, pushes you, helps you, gets cross with you, but above all he teaches you the value of a good director. Stanley brought out aspects of my personality and acting instincts that had been dormant ... My strong suspicion [was] that I was involved in something great". He further added that working with Kubrick was "a stunning experience" and that he never recovered from working with somebody of such magnificence.

=== Cinematography ===
Kubrick credited the ease with which he filmed scenes to his early years as a photographer. He rarely added camera instructions in the script, preferring to handle that after a scene is created, as the visual part of film-making came easiest to him. Even when deciding which props and settings would be used, Kubrick paid meticulous attention to detail and tried to collect as much background material as possible, activities the director likened to being "a detective". Cinematographer John Alcott, who worked closely with Kubrick on four of his films, remarked that Kubrick "questions everything", and was involved in the technical aspects of film-making including camera placement, scene composition, choice of lens, and even operating the camera which would usually be left to the cinematographer. Alcott considered Kubrick to be the "nearest thing to genius I've ever worked with, with all the problems of a genius".

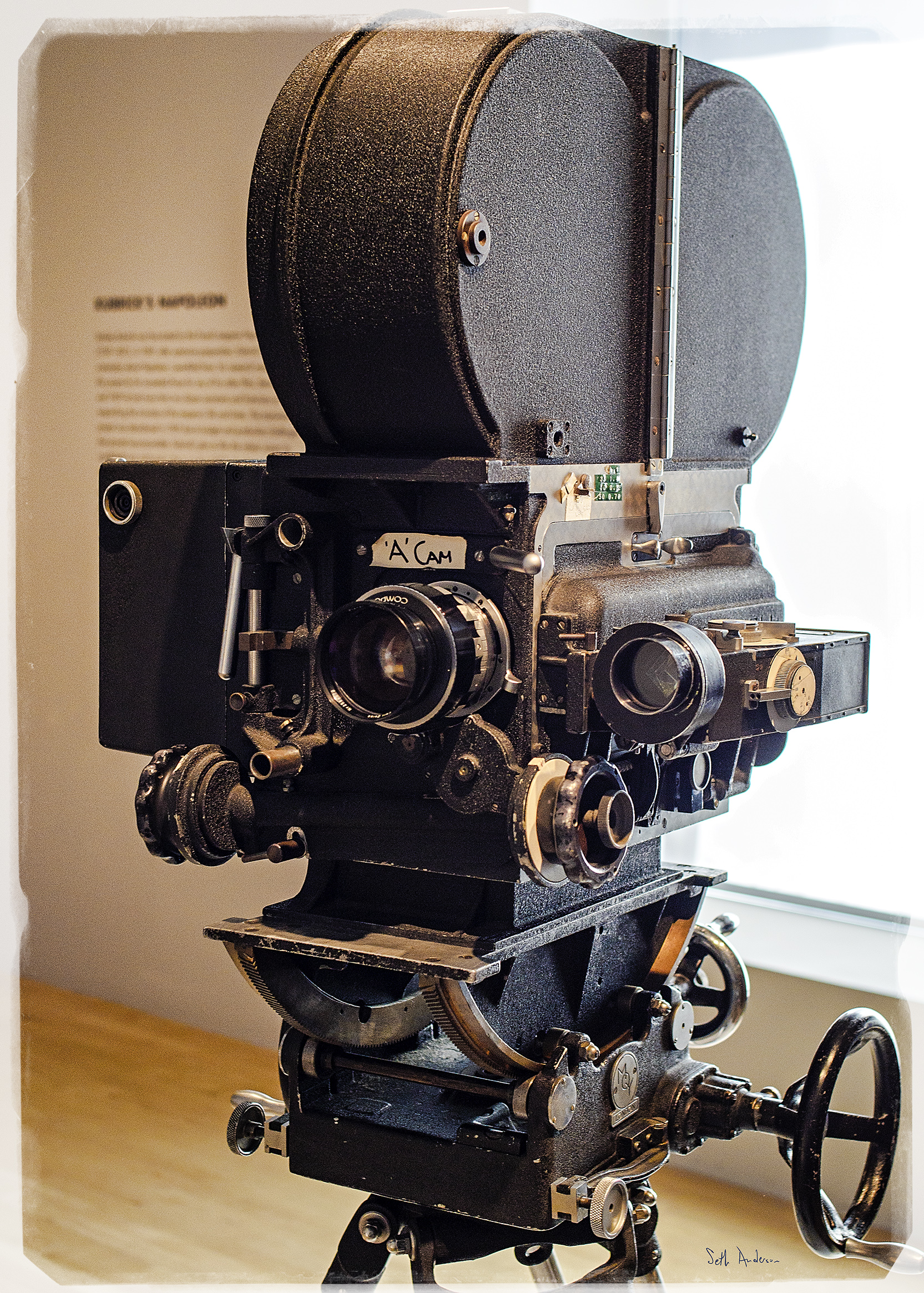
Kubrick's camera, possibly used in Barry Lyndon

Among Kubrick's innovations in cinematography are his use of special effects, as in 2001, where he used both slit-scan photography and front-screen projection, which won Kubrick his only Oscar for special effects. Some reviewers have discussed Kubrick's use of "one-point perspective", which leads the viewer's eye towards a central vanishing point. The technique relies on creating a complex visual symmetry using parallel lines in a scene which all converge on that single point, leading away from the viewer. Combined with camera motion it could produce an effect that one writer describes as "hypnotic and thrilling". The Shining was among the first half-dozen features to use the then-revolutionary Steadicam (after the 1976 films Bound for Glory, Marathon Man and Rocky). Kubrick used it to its fullest potential, which gave the audience smooth, stabilized, motion-tracking by the camera. Kubrick described Steadicam as being like a "magic carpet", allowing "fast, flowing, camera movements" in the maze in The Shining which otherwise would have been impossible.

Kubrick was among the first directors to use video assist during filming. At the time he began using it in 1966, it was considered cutting-edge technology, requiring him to build his own system. Having it in place during the filming of 2001, he was able to view a video of a take immediately after it was filmed. On some films, such as Barry Lyndon, he used custom-made zoom lenses, which allowed him to start a scene with a close-up and slowly zoom out to capture the full panorama of scenery and to film long takes under changing outdoor lighting conditions by making aperture adjustments while the cameras rolled. LoBrutto notes that Kubrick's technical knowledge about lenses "dazzled the manufacturer's engineers, who found him to be unprecedented among contemporary filmmakers". For Barry Lyndon he also used a specially adapted high-speed (f/0.7) Zeiss camera lens, originally developed for NASA, to shoot scenes lit only with candlelight. Actor Steven Berkoff recalls that Kubrick wanted scenes to be shot using "pure candlelight", and in doing so Kubrick "made a unique contribution to the art of filmmaking going back to painting ... You almost posed like for portraits." LoBrutto notes that cinematographers all over the world wanted to know about Kubrick's "magic lens" and that he became a "legend" among cameramen around the world.

=== Editing and music ===
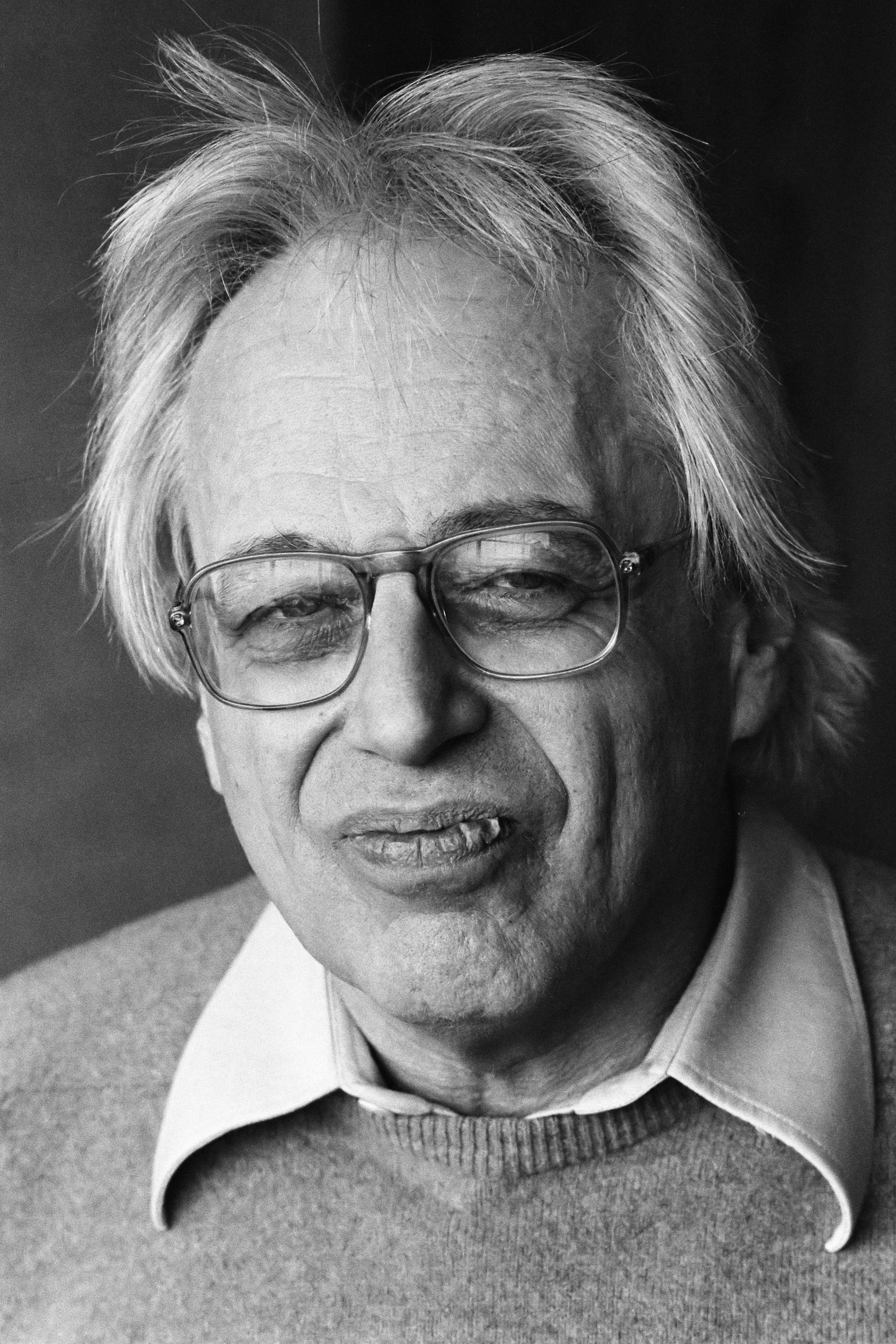
György Ligeti, whose music Kubrick used in 2001: A Space Odyssey, The Shining and Eyes Wide Shut

Kubrick spent extensive hours editing, often working seven days a week, and more hours a day as he got closer to deadlines. For Kubrick, written dialogue was one element to be put in balance with mise en scène (set arrangements), music, and especially, editing. Inspired by Pudovkin's treatise on film editing, Kubrick realized that one could create a performance in the editing room and often "re-direct" a film, and he remarked: "I love editing. I think I like it more than any other phase of filmmaking ... Editing is the only unique aspect of filmmaking which does not resemble any other art form—a point so important it cannot be overstressed ... It can make or break a film". Biographer John Baxter stated:

Instead of finding the intellectual spine of a film in the script before starting work, Kubrick felt his way towards the final version of a film by shooting each scene from many angles and demanding scores of takes on each line. Then over months ... he arranged and rearranged the tens of thousands of scraps of film to fit a vision that really only began to emerge during editing.

Kubrick's attention to music was an aspect of what many referred to as his "perfectionism" and extreme attention to detail, which his wife Christiane attributed to an addiction to music. In his last six films, Kubrick usually chose music from existing sources, especially classical compositions. He preferred selecting recorded music over having it composed for a film. He also felt that building scenes from great music often created the "most memorable scenes" in the best films. In one instance, for a scene in Barry Lyndon which was written into the screenplay as merely, "Barry duels with Lord Bullingdon", he spent forty-two working days in the editing phase. During that period, he listened to what LoBrutto describes as "every available recording of seventeenth-and eighteenth- century music, acquiring thousands of records to find Handel's sarabande used to score the scene". Nicholson likewise observed his attention to music, stating that Kubrick "listened constantly to music until he discovered something he felt was right or that excited him".

Kubrick is credited with introducing Hungarian composer György Ligeti to a broad Western audience by including his music in 2001, The Shining and Eyes Wide Shut. According to Baxter, the music in 2001 was "at the forefront of Kubrick's mind" when he conceived the film. During earlier screening he played music by Mendelssohn (Note: Baxter states that Kubrick had originally intended using the scherzo from Mendelssohn's A Midsummer Night's Dream to accompany the shuttle docking at the space station but changed his mind after hearing Johann Strauss's Blue Danube waltz.) and Vaughan Williams, and Kubrick and writer Clarke had listened to Carl Orff's transcription of Carmina Burana, consisting of 13th century sacred and secular songs. Ligeti's music employed the new style of micropolyphony, which used sustained dissonant chords that shift slowly over time, a style he originated. Its inclusion in the film became a "boon for the relatively unknown composer".

In addition to Ligeti, Kubrick enjoyed a collaboration with composer Wendy Carlos. In 1971, Carlos composed and recorded music for the soundtrack of A Clockwork Orange. Additional music not used in the film was released in 1972 as Wendy Carlos's Clockwork Orange. Kubrick later collaborated with Carlos on The Shining (1980). The opening of the film employs Carlos' rendering of "Dies Irae" (Day of Wrath) from Hector Berlioz's Symphonie Fantastique. Kubrick also worked with his daughter Vivian Kubrick, who was credited under the pseudonym "Abigail Mead", on Full Metal Jacket (1987).

== Personal life ==
Kubrick married his high-school sweetheart Toba Metz, a caricaturist, on May 29, 1948, when he was 19. The couple lived together in Greenwich Village and divorced in 1951. He met his second wife, the Austrian-born dancer and theatrical designer Ruth Sobotka, in 1952. They lived together in New York City's East Village beginning in 1952, married in January 1955 and moved to Hollywood in July 1955, where she played a brief part as a ballet dancer in Kubrick's film Killer's Kiss (1955). The following year, she was art director for his film The Killing (1956). They divorced in 1957.

During the production of Paths of Glory in Munich in early 1957, Kubrick met and romanced the German actress Christiane Harlan. Kubrick married Harlan in 1958 and the couple remained together until his death in 1999. Besides his stepdaughter, they had two daughters together: Anya Renata and Vivian Vanessa. In 1959, they settled into a home at 316 South Camden Drive in Beverly Hills with Harlan's daughter, Katherina, aged six. They also lived in New York City, during which time Christiane studied art at the Art Students League of New York. The couple moved to the United Kingdom in 1961 to make Lolita, and Kubrick hired Peter Sellers to star in his next film, Dr. Strangelove. Sellers was unable to leave the UK, so Kubrick made Britain his permanent home thereafter. The move was convenient to Kubrick, since he shunned the Hollywood system and its publicity machine and he and Christiane had become alarmed with the increase in violence in New York City.

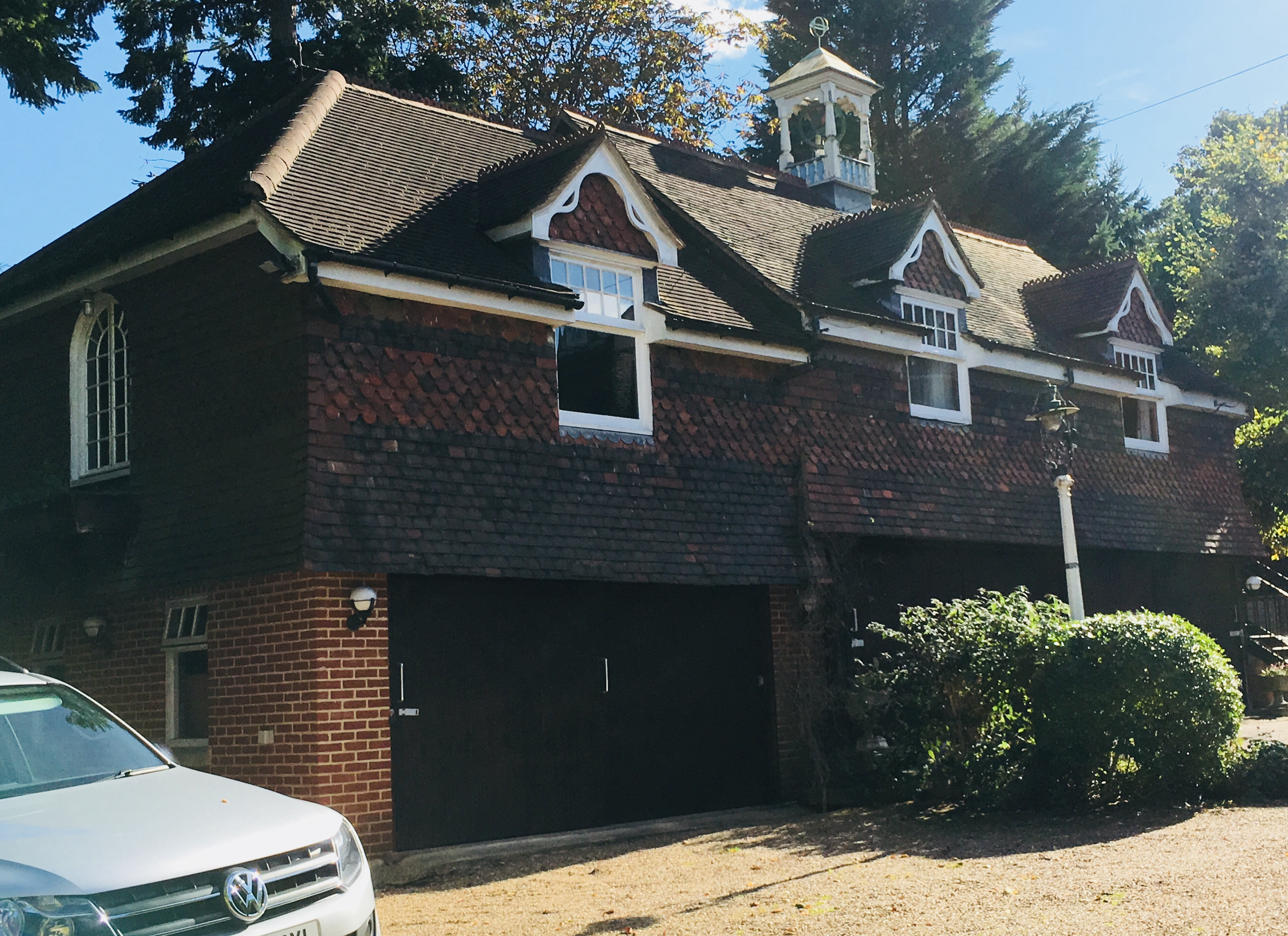
Stanley Kubrick Guest House at Abbots Mead, Borehamwood, where he edited his most important films

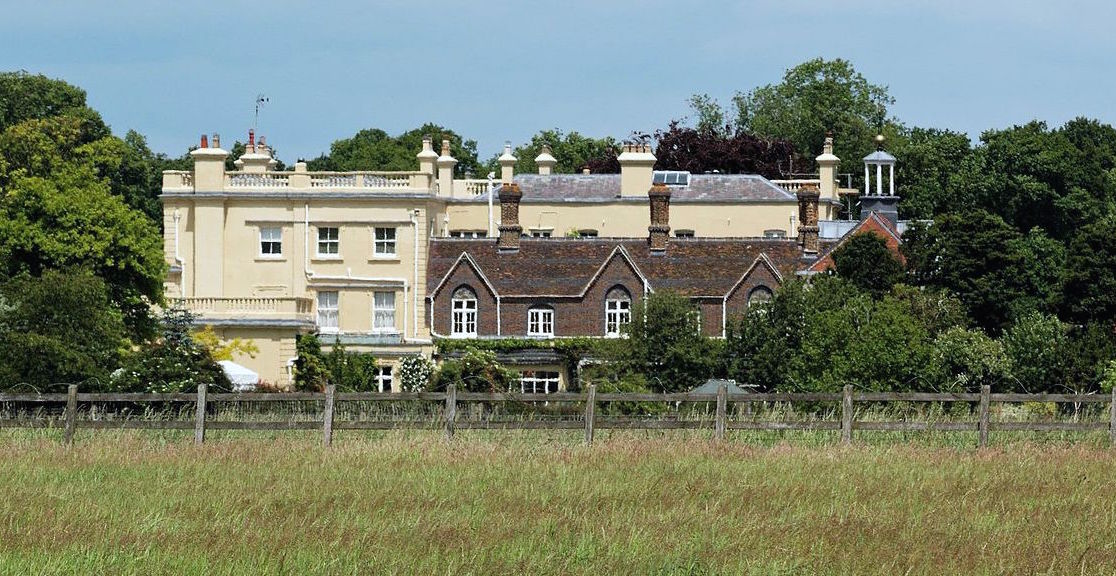
Kubrick's Childwickbury Manor in Hertfordshire, England

In 1965, the Kubricks bought Abbots Mead on Barnet Lane, just south-west of the Elstree/Borehamwood studio complex in England. Kubrick worked almost exclusively from this home for 14 years, where he researched, invented special effects techniques, designed ultra-low light lenses for specially modified cameras, pre-produced, edited, post-produced, advertised, distributed and carefully managed all aspects of four of his films. In 1978, Kubrick moved into Childwickbury Manor in Hertfordshire, a mainly 18th-century stately home, about 30 mi (50 km) north of London. His new home became a workplace for Kubrick and his wife, "a perfect family factory" as Christiane called it, and Kubrick converted the stables into extra production rooms.

A workaholic, Kubrick rarely took a vacation or left England during the forty years before his death. LoBrutto notes that Kubrick's confined way of living and desire for privacy has led to spurious stories about his reclusiveness. Michael Herr, Kubrick's co-screenwriter on Full Metal Jacket, considers his "reclusiveness" to be myth: "[He] was in fact a complete failure as a recluse, unless you believe that a recluse is simply someone who seldom leaves his house ... he was one of the most gregarious men I ever knew and it didn't change anything that most of this conviviality went on over the phone." LoBrutto states that one of the reasons Kubrick acquired a reputation as a recluse was that he insisted on remaining near his home. Kubrick believed there were only three places on Earth where he could make high-quality films: Los Angeles, New York City and London. He disliked living in Los Angeles and thought London a superior film production center to New York City.

As a person, Kubrick was described by Norman Lloyd as "a very dark, sort of a glowering type who was very serious". Marisa Berenson, who starred in Barry Lyndon, recalled: "There was great tenderness in him and he was passionate about his work. What was striking was his enormous intelligence but he also had a great sense of humor. He was a very shy person and self-protective but he was filled with the thing that drove him twenty-four hours of the day." Kubrick was particularly fond of machines and technical equipment, to the point that his wife Christiane once stated that "Stanley would be happy with eight tape recorders and one pair of pants". Kubrick had obtained a pilot's license in August 1947 and some have claimed that he later developed a fear of flying, stemming from an incident in the early 1950s when a colleague was killed in a plane crash. Kubrick had been sent the charred remains of his camera and notebooks which, according to Paul Duncan, traumatized him. (Note: Duncan notes that during the filming of Spartacus in Spain, Kubrick had suffered a nervous breakdown after the flight and was "terribly ill" during the filming there, and his return flight would be his last one. Matthew Modine, star of Full Metal Jacket, has stated that the stories about his fear of flying were "fabricated" and that Kubrick simply preferred spending most of his time in England, where his films were produced and where he lived.) Kubrick also had a strong mistrust of doctors.

== Death ==
On March 7, 1999, six days after screening a final cut of Eyes Wide Shut for his family and the film's stars, Kubrick died of a heart attack in his sleep at the age of 70, at his manor house in Childwickbury, Hertfordshire. His funeral was held there five days later, with only close friends and family in attendance, totaling about 100 people. The media were kept a mile away outside the entrance gate. Among those who gave eulogies were his brother-in-law Jan Harlan, Terry Semel, Steven Spielberg, Nicole Kidman, and Tom Cruise. He was buried next to his favorite tree on the estate.

== Filmography ==
Directed features
Year	Title	Distribution
1952	Fear and Desire	Joseph Burstyn
1955	Killer's Kiss	United Artists
1956	The Killing	United Artists
1957	Paths of Glory	United Artists
1960	Spartacus	Universal International
1962	Lolita	Metro-Goldwyn-Mayer
1964	Dr. Strangelove or: How I Learned to Stop Worrying and Love the Bomb	Columbia Pictures Corporation
1968	2001: A Space Odyssey	Metro-Goldwyn-Mayer
1971	A Clockwork Orange	Warner Bros./Columbia-Warner Distributors
1975	Barry Lyndon	Warner Bros./Columbia-Warner Distributors
1980	The Shining	Warner Bros./Columbia-Warner Distributors
1987	Full Metal Jacket	Warner Bros.
1999	Eyes Wide Shut	Warner Bros.

== Legacy ==
=== Cultural impact ===
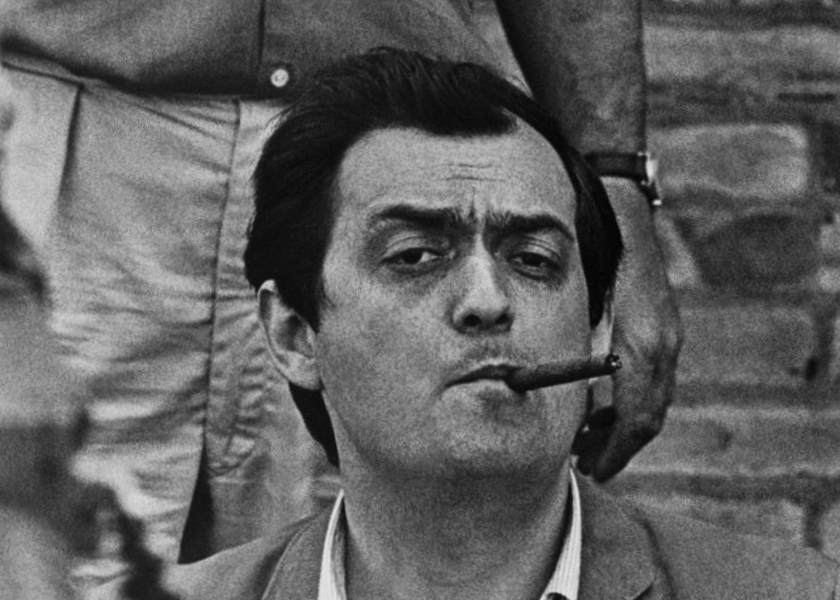
Kubrick in a frame of the trailer of Dr. Strangelove (1964)

Part of the New Hollywood film-making wave, Kubrick's films are considered by film historian Michel Ciment to be "among the most important contributions to world cinema in the twentieth century", and he is frequently cited as one of the greatest and most influential film directors. According to film historian Robert Kolker, Leading directors, including Martin Scorsese, Steven Spielberg, Wes Anderson, George Lucas, James Cameron, Terry Gilliam, the Coen brothers, Ridley Scott, and George A. Romero, have cited Kubrick as a source of inspiration, and additionally in the case of Spielberg and Scott, collaboration. Steven Spielberg comments that the way Kubrick "tells a story is antithetical to the way we are accustomed to receiving stories" and that "nobody could shoot a picture better in history". Orson Welles, one of Kubrick's greatest personal influences and favorite directors, said that: "Among those whom I would call 'younger generation', Kubrick appears to me to be a giant."

Kubrick continues to be cited as a major influence by many directors, including Brad Bird, Christopher Nolan, Todd Field, David Fincher, Guillermo del Toro, David Lynch, Lars von Trier, Tim Burton, Michael Mann, Gaspar Noé, and Don Hertzfeldt.

Artists in fields other than film have also expressed admiration for Kubrick. English musician and poet PJ Harvey argued that "something about [...] what is not said in his films...there's so much space, so many things that are silent – and somehow, in that space and silence everything becomes clear. With every film, he seems to capture the essence of life itself". The music video for Kanye West's 2010 song "Runaway" was inspired by Eyes Wide Shut. Pop singer Lady Gaga's concert shows have included dialogue, costumes, and music from A Clockwork Orange.

=== Tributes ===
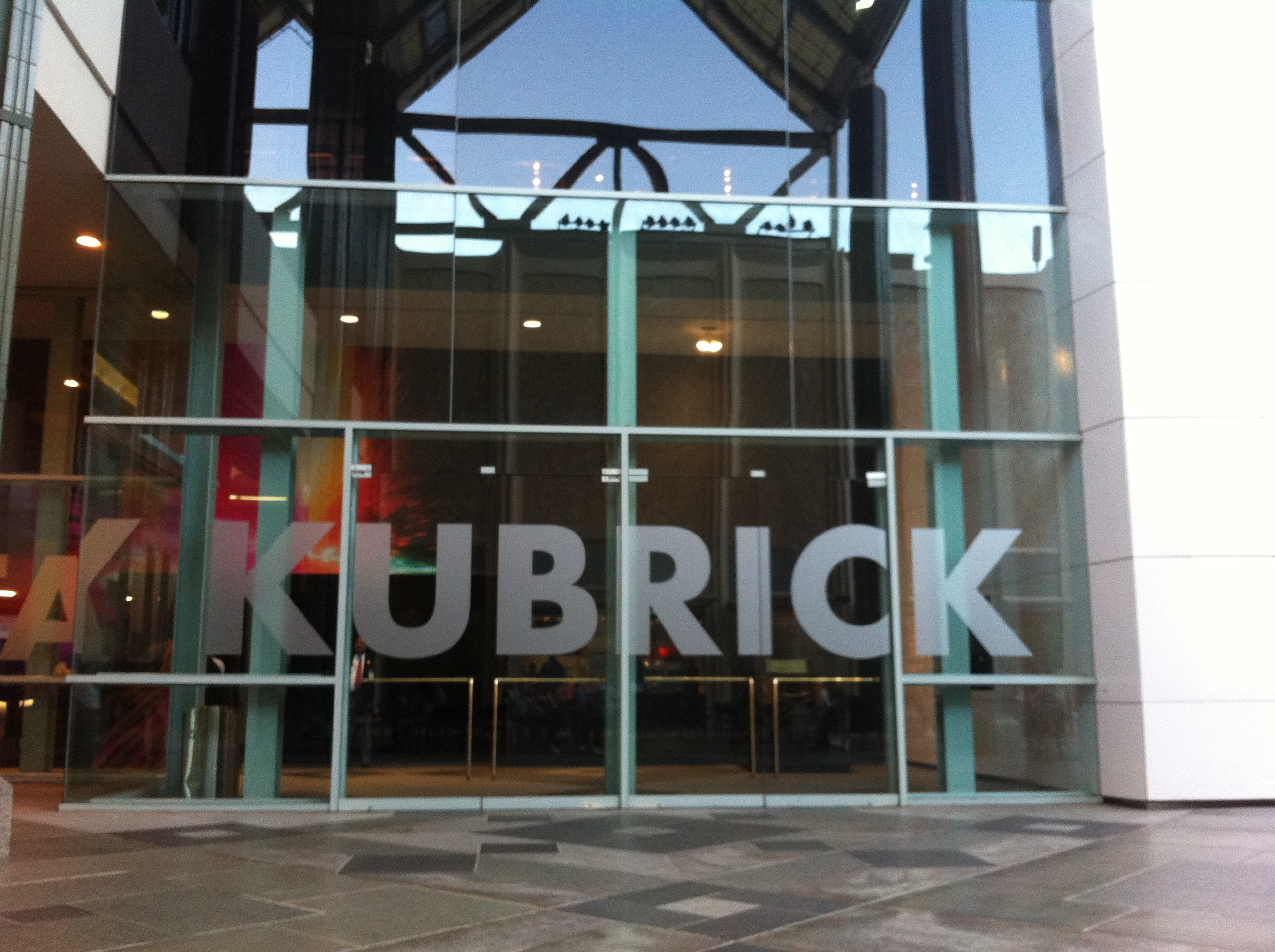
Entrance to Kubrick museum exhibit at LACMA

In 2000, BAFTA renamed their Britannia lifetime achievement award the "Stanley Kubrick Britannia Award". Many people who worked with Kubrick created the 2001 documentary Stanley Kubrick: A Life in Pictures, produced and directed by Kubrick's brother-in-law, Jan Harlan.

The first public exhibition of material from Kubrick's personal archives was presented jointly in 2004 by the Deutsches Filmmuseum and Deutsches Architekturmuseum in Frankfurt, Germany, in cooperation with Christiane Kubrick and Jan Harlan / The Stanley Kubrick Estate. In 2009, an exhibition of paintings and photos inspired by Kubrick's films was held in Dublin, Ireland. On October 30, 2012, an exhibition devoted to Kubrick opened at the Los Angeles County Museum of Art and concluded in June 2013. In October 2013, the Brazil São Paulo International Film Festival staged an exhibit of his work and a retrospective of his films. The exhibit opened at the Toronto International Film Festival (TIFF) in late 2014 and ended in January 2015.

Kubrick is widely referenced in popular culture; for example, the TV series The Simpsons is said to contain more references to Kubrick films than any other pop culture phenomenon. When the Directors Guild of Great Britain gave Kubrick a lifetime achievement award, they included a sequence of all the homages from the show. Several works have been created that related to Kubrick's life, including the made-for-TV mockumentary Dark Side of the Moon (2002), which is a parody of the conspiracy theory that Kubrick had been involved with the faked footage of the NASA Moon landings. Colour Me Kubrick (2005) was authorized by Kubrick's family and starred John Malkovich as Alan Conway, a con artist who had assumed Kubrick's identity in the 1990s. In the 2004 film The Life and Death of Peter Sellers, Kubrick was portrayed by Stanley Tucci.

In April 2018, the International Astronomical Union named the largest mountain of Pluto's moon Charon after Kubrick.

== See also ==
- List of atheists in film, radio, television and theater
- Filmworker, a documentary with Leon Vitali about his work with Kubrick
- Hawk Films
- Kubrick by Kubrick, a documentary directed by Gregory Monro and based on Michel Ciment's interviews
- Stanley Kubrick Archive
- Stanley Kubrick bibliography
- Stanley Kubrick's Boxes
- Stanley Kubrick: A Life in Pictures
- Stanley Kubrick's unrealized projects

== Sources ==
- Abrams, Jerold (May 4, 2007). The Philosophy of Stanley Kubrick. University Press of Kentucky. ISBN 978-0-8131-7256-9.
- Baxter, John (1997). Stanley Kubrick: A Biography. HarperCollins. ISBN 978-0-00-638445-8.
- Bingham, Dennis (2010). Whose Lives Are They Anyway?: Whose Lives Are They Anyway? The Biopic as Contemporary Film Genre. Rutgers University Press. ISBN 978-0-8135-4930-9.
- Carr, Jay (2002). The A List: The National Society of Film Critics' 100 Essential Films. Da Capo Press. p. 1. ISBN 0-306-81096-4.
- Ciment, Michel (1980). Kubrick: The Definitive Edition. Faber and Faber, Inc.
- Cocks, Geoffrey (2004). The Wolf at the Door: Stanley Kubrick, History, & the Holocaust. Peter Lang. ISBN 978-0-8204-7115-0.
- Debolt, Abbe A.; Baugess, James S. (2011). Encyclopedia of the Sixties: A Decade of Culture and Counterculture. ABC-CLIO. ISBN 978-1-4408-0102-0.
- Duchesneau, Louise; Marx, Wolfgang (2011). György Ligeti: Of Foreign Lands and Strange Sounds. Boydell & Brewer Ltd. ISBN 978-1-84383-550-9.
- Duncan, Paul (2003). Stanley Kubrick: The Complete Films. Taschen GmbH. ISBN 978-3-8365-2775-0.
- Duncan, Paul (2003a). Stanley Kubrick: Visual Poet 1928–1999. Taschen. ISBN 978-3-8228-1592-2.
- Estrin, Mark W. (2002). Orson Welles: Interviews. Univ. Press of Mississippi. ISBN 978-1-57806-209-6.
- Gilmour, David (February 2, 2008). Film Club: A True Story of a Father and a Son. Dundurn. ISBN 978-0-88762-349-3.
- Herr, Michael (2001). Kubrick. Pan Macmillan. ISBN 978-0-330-48113-7.
- Howard, James (1999). Stanley Kubrick Companion. Batsford. ISBN 978-0-7134-8487-8.
- Kagan, Norman (2000). Cinema of Stanley Kubrick: Third Edition. Bloomsbury Academic. ISBN 978-0-8264-1243-0.
- Kercher, Stephen E. (2010). Revel with a Cause: Liberal Satire in Postwar America. University of Chicago Press. ISBN 978-0-226-43165-9.
- King, Geoff; Molloy, Claire; Tzioumakis, Yannis (2013). American Independent Cinema: Indie, Indiewood and Beyond. Routledge. ISBN 978-0-415-68428-6.
- Kolker, Robert (July 7, 2011). A Cinema of Loneliness. Oxford University Press, USA. ISBN 978-0-19-973888-5.
- Kubrick, Christiane (2002). Stanley Kubrick: A Life in Pictures. Little, Brown. ISBN 978-0-8212-2815-9.
- LoBrutto, Vincent (1999). Stanley Kubrick: A Biography. Da Capo Press. ISBN 978-0-306-80906-4.
- McBride, Joseph (2012). Steven Spielberg: A Biography (Third ed.). Faber & Faber. ISBN 978-0-571-28055-1.
- Naremore, James (2007). On Kubrick. Bloomsbury Academic. ISBN 978-1-84457-142-0.
- Zimmerman, Paul D. (January 3, 1972). "Kubrick's Brilliant Vision". Newsweek. pp. 29–33.
- Raphael, Frederic (1999). Eyes Wide Open: A Memoir of Stanley Kubrick and Eyes Wide Shut. Orion. ISBN 978-0-7528-1868-9.
- Rhodes, Gary Don (2008). Stanley Kubrick: Essays on His Films and Legacy. McFarland & Company. ISBN 978-0-7864-3297-4.
- Robb, Brian J.; Simpson, Paul (2013). Middle-earth Envisioned: The Hobbit and The Lord of the Rings: On Screen, On Stage, and Beyond. Race Point Publishing. ISBN 978-1-937994-27-3.
- Rosenfeld, Albert (1968). LIFE. Time Inc. p. 34. ISSN 0024-3019.
- Schneider, Steven Jay (October 1, 2012). 1001 Movies You Must See Before You Die 2012. Octopus Publishing Group. ISBN 978-1-84403-733-9.
- Smith, Warren (2010). Celebrities in Hell. ChelCbooks. ISBN 978-1-56980-214-4.
- Thuss, Holger (2002). Students on the Right Way: European Democrat Students, 1961–2001. H. Thuss. ISBN 978-3-8311-4129-6.
- Wakeman, John (1987). World Film Directors: 1890–1945. H. W. Wilson Co. ISBN 978-0-8242-0757-1.
- Walker, Alexander (1972). Stanley Kubrick directs. Harcourt Brace Jovanovich. ISBN 978-0-15-684892-3.
- Walker, Alexander (1981). Peter Sellers, the authorized biography. Macmillan. ISBN 978-0-02-622960-9.
- Webster, Patrick (2010). Love and Death in Kubrick: A Critical Study of the Films from Lolita through Eyes Wide Shut. McFarland. ISBN 978-0-7864-6191-2.
