= Stanley Kubrick filmography =

Stanley Kubrick (1928–1999) was an American filmmaker and photographer. He directed thirteen feature films and three short documentaries over the course of his career. His work as a director, spanning diverse genres, is regarded as highly influential.

Kubrick made his directorial debut in 1951 with the documentary short Day of the Fight, followed by Flying Padre later that year. In 1953, he directed his first feature film, Fear and Desire. The anti-war allegory's themes reappeared in his later films. His next works were the film noir pictures Killer's Kiss (1955) and The Killing (1956). Critic Roger Ebert praised The Killing and retrospectively called it Kubrick's "first mature feature". Kubrick then directed two Hollywood films starring Kirk Douglas: Paths of Glory (1957) and Spartacus (1960). The latter won the Golden Globe Award for Best Motion Picture – Drama. His next film was Lolita (1962), an adaptation of Vladimir Nabokov's novel of the same name. It was nominated for the Academy Award for Best Adapted Screenplay. His 1964 film, the Cold War satire Dr. Strangelove featuring Peter Sellers and George C. Scott, received the BAFTA Award for Best Film. Along with The Killing, it remains the highest rated film directed by Kubrick according to Rotten Tomatoes.

In 1968, Kubrick directed the space epic 2001: A Space Odyssey. Now widely regarded as among the most influential films ever made, 2001 garnered Kubrick his only personal Academy Award for his work as director of special effects. His next project, the dystopian A Clockwork Orange (1971), was an initially X-rated adaptation of Anthony Burgess' 1962 novella. After reports of crimes inspired by the film's depiction of "ultra-violence", Kubrick had it withdrawn from distribution in the United Kingdom. Kubrick then directed the period piece Barry Lyndon (1975), in a departure from his two previous futuristic films. It did not perform well commercially and received mixed reviews, but won four Oscars at the 48th Academy Awards. In 1980, Kubrick adapted a Stephen King novel into The Shining, starring Jack Nicholson and Shelley Duvall. Although Kubrick was nominated for a Golden Raspberry Award for Worst Director, The Shining is now widely regarded as one of the greatest horror films of all time. Seven years later, he released the Vietnam War film Full Metal Jacket. It remains the highest rated of Kubrick's later films according to Rotten Tomatoes and Metacritic. In the early 1990s, Kubrick abandoned his plans to direct a Holocaust film titled The Aryan Papers. He was hesitant to compete with Steven Spielberg's Schindler's List and had become "profoundly depressed" after working extensively on the project. His final film, the erotic thriller Eyes Wide Shut starring Tom Cruise and Nicole Kidman, was released posthumously in 1999. An unfinished project that Kubrick referred to as Pinocchio was completed by Spielberg as A.I. Artificial Intelligence (2001).

In 1997, the Venice Film Festival awarded Kubrick the Golden Lion for Lifetime Achievement. That same year, he received a Directors Guild of America Lifetime Achievement Award, then called the D.W. Griffith Award. In 1999, the British Academy of Film and Television Arts (BAFTA) presented Kubrick with a Britannia Award. After his death, BAFTA renamed the award in his honor: "The Stanley Kubrick Britannia Award for Excellence in Film". He was posthumously awarded a BAFTA Fellowship in 2000.

== Film ==
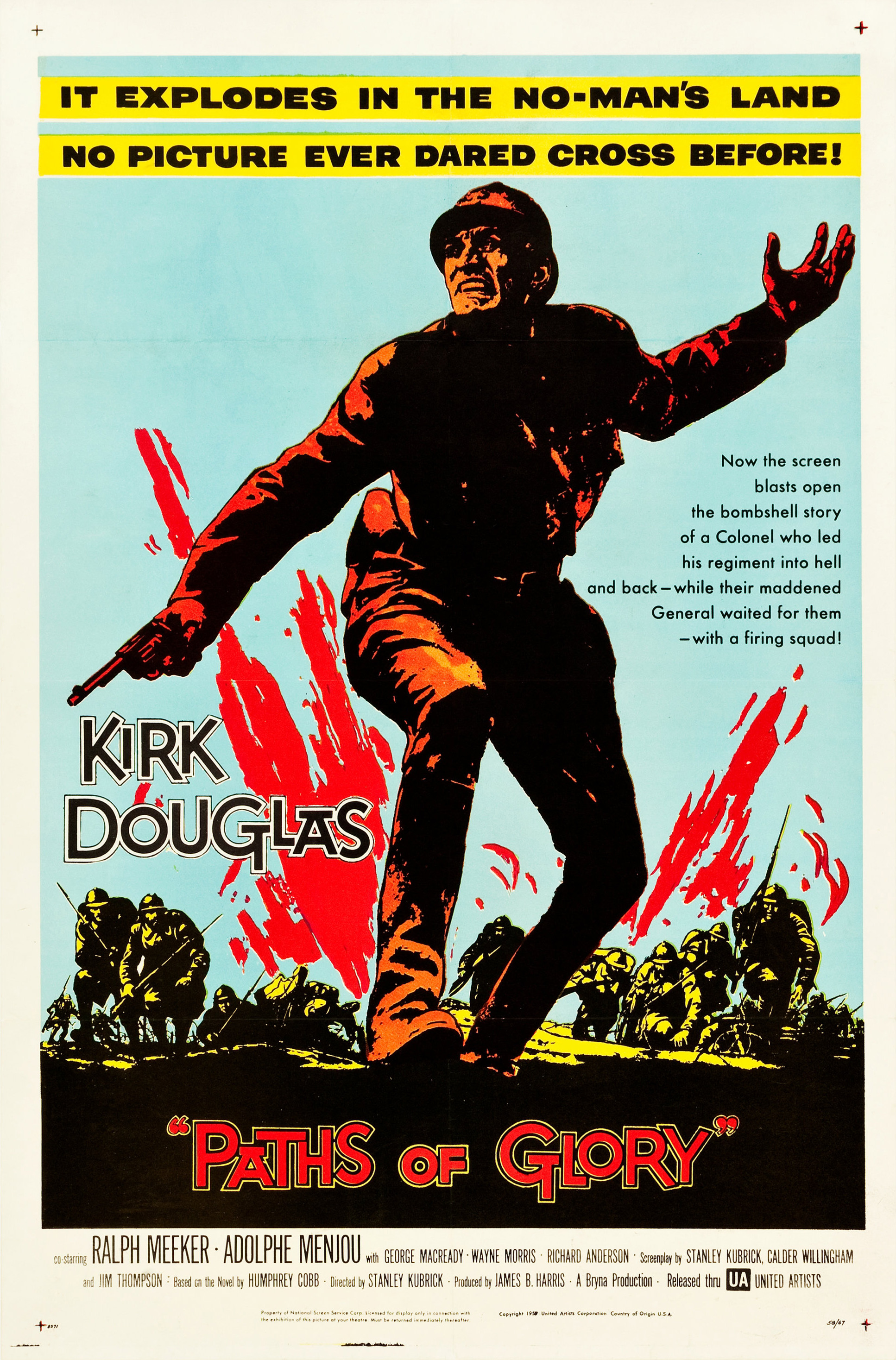
Poster for Paths of Glory (1957)

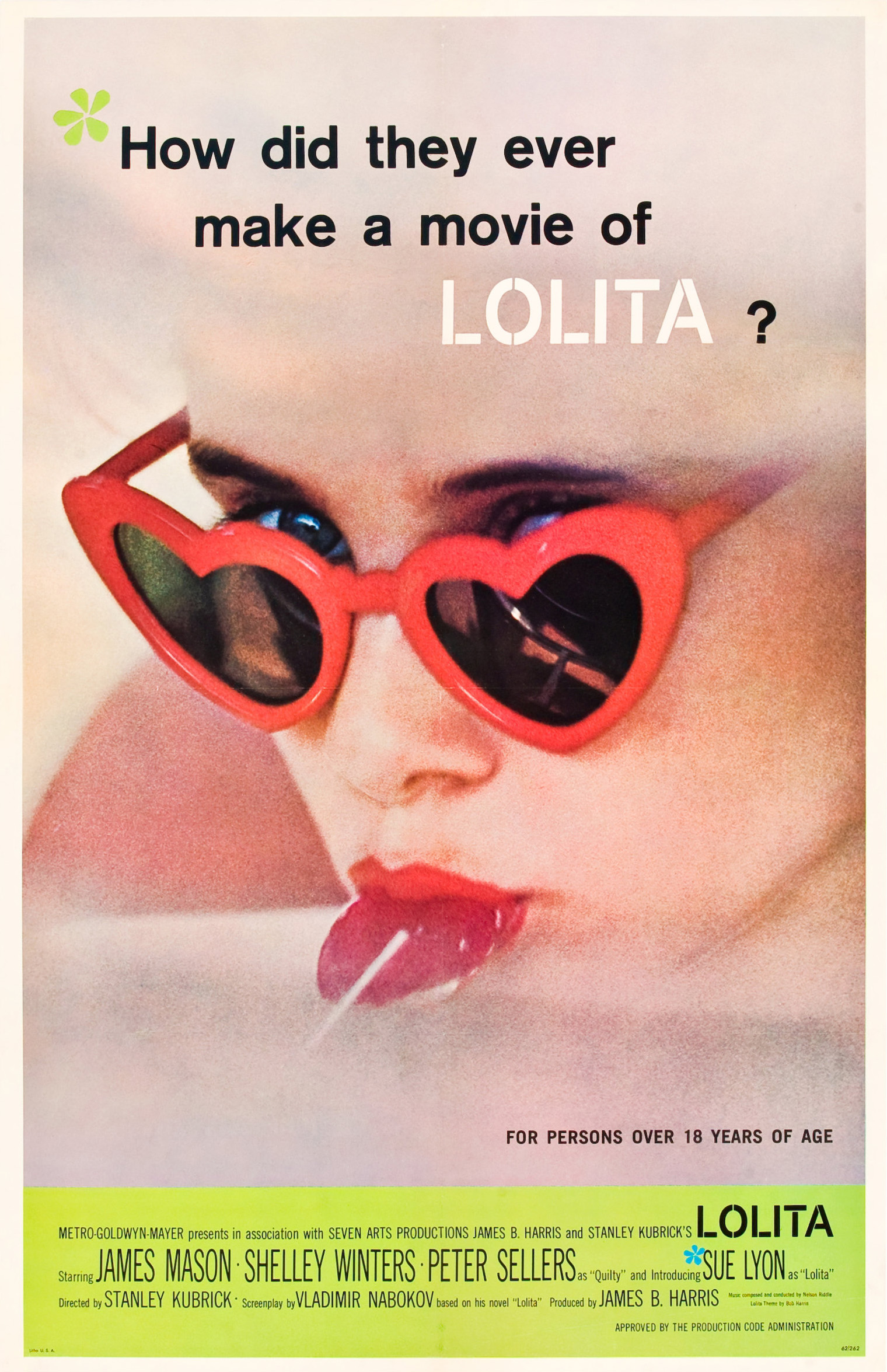
Poster for Lolita (1962)

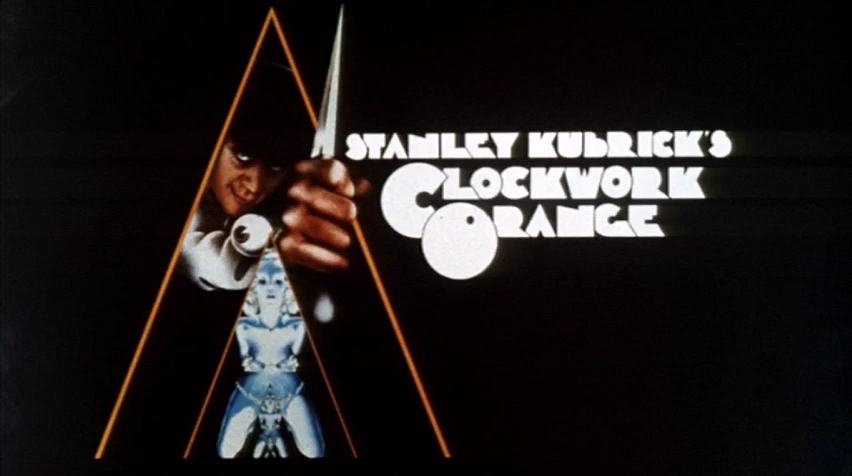
Poster for A Clockwork Orange (1971)

Table featuring films directed by Stanley Kubrick
Year	Title	Director	Writer	Producer	Notes	Ref(s).
1952	Fear and Desire	Yes	No	Yes	Also cinematographer, editor, and sound designer	
1955	Killer's Kiss	Yes	Story	Yes	Also cinematographer, editor, and sound designer	
1956	The Killing	Yes	Yes	No	Based on Clean Break by Lionel White	
1957	Paths of Glory	Yes	Yes	Executive	Based on the 1935 novel by Humphrey Cobb; Co-adapted with Calder Willingham and Jim Thompson	
1960	Spartacus	Yes	No	No	Based on the 1951 novel by Howard Fast	
1962	Lolita	Yes	No	No	Based on the 1955 novel by Vladimir Nabokov	
1964	Dr. Strangelove or: How I Learned to Stop Worrying and Love the Bomb	Yes	Yes	Yes	Based on Red Alert by Peter George; Co-adapted with Terry Southern and Peter George	
1968	2001: A Space Odyssey	Yes	Yes	Yes	Co-written with Arthur C. Clarke; Also director and designer of special photographic effects	
1971	A Clockwork Orange	Yes	Yes	Yes	Based on the 1962 novel by Anthony Burgess	
1975	Barry Lyndon	Yes	Yes	Yes	Based on The Luck of Barry Lyndon by William Makepeace Thackeray	
1980	The Shining	Yes	Yes	Yes	Based on the 1977 novel by Stephen King; Co-adapted with Diane Johnson	
1987	Full Metal Jacket	Yes	Yes	Yes	Based on The Short-Timers by Gustav Hasford; Co-adapted with Michael Herr and Gustav Hasford	
1999	Eyes Wide Shut	Yes	Yes	Yes	Based on Dream Story by Arthur Schnitzler; Co-adapted with Frederic Raphael; Posthumous release	

=== Documentary shorts ===
Table featuring films directed by Stanley Kubrick
Year	Title	Director	Writer	Producer	Cinematographer	Editor	Ref(s).
1951	Day of the Fight	Yes	Yes	Yes	Yes	Uncredited	
1951	Flying Padre	Yes	Yes	No	Yes	No	
1952	World Assembly of Youth	Yes?	No	No	No	No	
1953	The Seafarers	Yes	No	Yes	Yes	Yes	

== Television ==
In 1952, sounds, effects, and music brought the production of Fear and Desire over budget to around $53,000, and Kubrick had to be bailed out by producer Richard de Rochemont, on condition that he work as a second unit director on de Rochemont's production of a James Agee-written Norman Lloyd-co-directed five-part biographic series about Abraham Lincoln for the educational TV series Omnibus, filmed on location in Hodgenville, Kentucky, starring Royal Dano and Joanne Woodward.

== Reception ==
Table featuring the critical reception of films directed by Stanley Kubrick
Year	Title	Rotten Tomatoes	Metacritic
1953	Fear and Desire	70% (20 reviews)	—N/a
1955	Killer's Kiss	83% (29 reviews)	—N/a
1956	The Killing	96% (46 reviews)	91 (15 reviews)
1957	Paths of Glory	96% (77 reviews)	90 (18 reviews)
1960	Spartacus	93% (65 reviews)	87 (17 reviews)
1962	Lolita	89% (49 reviews)	79 (14 reviews)
1964	Dr. Strangelove	98% (95 reviews)	97 (32 reviews)
1968	2001: A Space Odyssey	90% (166 reviews)	84 (25 reviews)
1971	A Clockwork Orange	86% (84 reviews)	77 (21 reviews)
1975	Barry Lyndon	78% (143 reviews)	89 (21 reviews)
1980	The Shining	84% (108 reviews)	68 (26 reviews)
1987	Full Metal Jacket	90% (87 reviews)	78 (19 reviews)
1999	Eyes Wide Shut	77% (166 reviews)	69 (34 reviews)

== See also ==
- A.I. Artificial Intelligence is dedicated to Kubrick, who originally intended to direct the film.
- Stanley Kubrick bibliography
- Stanley Kubrick's unrealized projects
- List of accolades received by Stanley Kubrick
- List of recurring cast members in Stanley Kubrick films

== Bibliography ==
- Baxter, John (1997). Stanley Kubrick: A Biography. HarperCollins. ISBN 9780006384458.
- Duncan, Paul (2003). Stanley Kubrick: The Complete Films. Taschen GmbH. ISBN 9783836527750.
- Hughes, David (2000). The Complete Kubrick. Virgin Publishing. ISBN 0753504529.
- Kagan, Norman (2000). The Cinema of Stanley Kubrick. Continuum International Publishing Group. ISBN 0826412432.
- Naremore, James (2007). On Kubrick. British Film Institute. ISBN 9781844571420.
- Sperb, Jason (2006). The Kubrick Facade: Faces and Voices in the Films of Stanley Kubrick. The Scarecrow Press, Inc. ISBN 081085855X.
