= List of recurring cast members in Stanley Kubrick films =

The list of cast members who have appeared as recurring cast members in films directed by Stanley Kubrick has been relatively short. Some of the actors who have appeared in more than one film are listed in the table included in this section. The individual films may be consulted for the precise casting details in specific films.

== Table of recurring cast members ==
A few of these are uncredited in some of their roles.

James Harris worked as a co-producer and co-writer with Kubrick on four film, but only his uncredited acting cameos are listed here.

Although Kubrick's daughters' contributions to their father's films as music composer and art direction are credited under pseudonyms, their acting cameos are uncredited. Kubrick's future wife Christiane Kubrick is credited in Paths of Glory with her maiden name Christiane Harlan, as they met on the set.

Work Actor
Work Actor	Fear and Desire	Killer's Kiss	The Killing	Paths of Glory	Spartacus	Lolita	Dr. Strangelove	2001: A Space Odyssey	A Clockwork Orange	Barry Lyndon	The Shining	Full Metal Jacket	Eyes Wide Shut	Total
Frank Silvera	check	check												2
Ruth Sobotka		check	check											2
Joe Turkel			check	check							check			3
Timothy Carey			check	check										2
Sterling Hayden			check				check							2
Kirk Douglas				check	check									2
James B. Harris				check		check								2
Christiane Kubrick				check									check	2
Peter Sellers						check	check							2
Ed Bishop						check		check						2
Burnell Tucker							check	check			check			3
Leonard Rossiter								check		check				2
Margaret Tyzack								check	check					2
Vivian Kubrick								check		check	check	check		4
Steven Berkoff									check	check				2
Anthony Sharp									check	check				2
Patrick Magee									check	check				2
Pat Roach									check	check				2
Philip Stone									check	check	check			3
Norman Gay									check	check	check			3
Godfrey Quigley									check	check				2
Katharina Kubrick									check	check			check	3
Leon Vitali										check			check	2

== Quilty's "Dr. Zempf" and Sellers' role as Doctor Strangelove ==
Lolita has a scene lasting six minutes in which Quilty disguises himself as a German-accented high school psychologist named Dr. Zempf who persuades Humbert to allow Lolita more personal freedom so that she can act in the high school play (which is written by Quilty and produced with some supervision from him). This is modified from a scene in the novel in which there is a similar conversation with a genuine female school psychologist. The film version of this scene was sufficiently memorable that Edward Albee incorporated it into his stage adaptation of Lolita.

Numerous observers have seen similarities between Peter Sellers' performance of Quilty-as-Zempf and his subsequent role in Stanley Kubrick's next film, Dr. Strangelove as the titular character. Stanley Kubrick himself in an interview with Michel Ciment described both characters as "parodies of movie clichés of Nazis". Commenting elsewhere on the characters, Ciment writes "Peter Sellers prefigured his creation of Dr Strangelove, particularly in the role of Dr Zempf, the school psychologist whose thick German accent recalls that of the mad professor (note Kubrick's ambiguous feelings towards Germany, his admiration for its culture... his fear of its demonstrations of power...)". Thomas Allen Nelson has said that in this part of his performance, "Sellers twists his conception of Quilty toward that neo-Nazi monster, who will roll out of the cavernous shadows of Dr. Strangelove", later noting that Zempf "exaggerates Humbert's European pomposity through his psychobabble and German anality." The Kubrick interview has been commented by Geoffrey Cocks, author of a controversial book on the impact of the Holocaust on Kubrick's overall work, who notes that "Dr. Strangelove himself... is the mechanical chimera of modern horror."

Other observers of this similarity include Internet film critic Tim Dirks who has also noted that Sellers's smooth German-like accent and the chair-bound pose in this scene are similar to that of Dr. Strangelove. Finally, Barbara Wyllie, writing in Julian Connelly's anthology The Cambridge Companion to Nabokov, speaks of "Quilty's visit to the house in Beardsley, masquerading as Dr. Zempf, a German psychologist (a Sellers character that prefigures Dr. Strangelove in Kubrick's film of 1964)."
