= Stanley Kubrick Archive =

University of the Arts London archive

Coordinates: 51°29′40.85″N 0°6′6.77″W

The Stanley Kubrick Archive is held by the University of the Arts London in their Archives and Special Collections Centre at the London College of Communication.

== History ==
The Archive opened in October 2007 and contains material collected and owned by the film director Stanley Kubrick (1928–1999). It was transferred from his home in 2007 through a gift by his family. It contains much of Kubrick's working material that was accumulated during his lifetime.

== Collection ==
The collection spans Kubrick's career as a photographer for Look and as a film director. His films are: Fear and Desire, Killer's Kiss, The Killing, Paths of Glory, Spartacus, Lolita, Dr. Strangelove or: How I Learned to Stop Worrying and Love the Bomb, 2001: A Space Odyssey, A Clockwork Orange, Barry Lyndon, The Shining, Full Metal Jacket and Eyes Wide Shut. Kubrick also planned to make a number of other films; two in particular were abandoned just before production, Napoleon and The Aryan Papers. He also played an important role in the conception of AI: Artificial Intelligence, although it was completed after his death by Steven Spielberg.

The collection held by the university is made up of a range of material including props, scripts, research, production paperwork such as call sheets, costumes and photographs for all his films and Look, as well as material for those projects that were conceived but never visualised. By maintaining a high degree of control in the film making process, Kubrick was able to retain material generated by his pioneering techniques, research and production work: making this collection one of the most complete examples of film making practice worldwide.

== Exhibitions ==
The archive, prior to its donation to the university, is the subject of the documentary Stanley Kubrick's Boxes by Jon Ronson.

An internationally touring Stanley Kubrick exhibition (select dates between 2004-2023) included objects from the archive.

List of Stanley Kubrick Exhibitions
City	Country	Location	Start date	End date
Frankfurt am Main	Germany	Deutsches Filmmuseum (Deutsches Filminstitut) and Deutsches Architekturmuseum	31 March 2004	4 July 2004
Berlin	Germany	Martin-Gropius-Bau	20 January 2005	18 April 2005
Melbourne	Australia	Australian Centre for the Moving Image	25 November 2005	29 January 2006
Ghent	Belgium	Caermersclooster	5 October 2006	7 January 2007
Zurich	Switzerland	Kulturhaus Sihlcity	26 April 2007	2 September 2007
Rome	Italy	Palazzo delle Esposizioni	6 October 2007	6 January 2008
Paris	France	Cinémathèque française	23 March 2011	31 July 2011
Amsterdam	Netherlands	EYE Film Institute Netherlands	21 June 2012	9 September 2012
Los Angeles, California	United States	Los Angeles County Museum of Art	1 November 2012	30 June 2013
São Paulo	Brazil	São Paulo Museum of Image and Sound	9 October 2013	12 January 2014
Kraków	Poland	National Museum in Kraków	4 May 2014	14 September 2014
Toronto	Canada	TIFF Lightbox	31 October 2014	25 January 2015
Monterrey	Mexico	Museo de Arte Contemporáneo de Monterrey	6 March 2015	26 July 2015
Seoul	South Korea	Seoul Museum of Art	29 November 2015	13 March 2016
San Francisco, California	United States	Contemporary Jewish Museum	30 June 2016	30 October 2016
Mexico City	Mexico	Cineteca Nacional Mexico	1 December 2016	30 July 2017
Copenhagen	Denmark	Kunstforeningen	23 September 2017	14 January 2018
Frankfurt	Germany	Deutsches Filmmuseum (Deutsches Filminstitut) *Special exhibition: Kubrick's 2001: 50 Years A Space Odyssey	21 March 2018	23 September 2018
Barcelona	Spain	Centre de Cultura Contemporània de Barcelona	24 October 2018	31 March 2019
London	England	London Design Museum	26 April 2019	17 September 2019
New York City, New York	United States	Museum of the Moving Image *Special exhibition: Envisioning 2001: Stanley Kubrick's Space Odyssey	18 January 2020	17 October 2021
Madrid	Spain	Círculo de Bellas Artes	21 December 2021	8 May 2022
Istanbul	Turkey	Istanbul Sinema Müzesi (Atlas Cinema)	30 September 2022	31 March 2023
