= World Assembly of Youth (film) =

1952 film

- Produced by: News of the Day
- Music by: Ballet Theater - Ballet by George Balanchine, NBC Symphony Orchestra - Conductor Pierre Monteux
- Production company: News of the Day (formerly Hearst Metrotone News)
- Distributed by: Department of State
- Release date: July 1, 1952
- Running time: 33:46
- Country: United States
- Language: English

World Assembly of Youth is an American documentary film released on July 1, 1952, by the Young Adult Council, a member of the World Assembly of Youth. The film was produced by News of the Day, formerly known as Hearst Metrotone News. The film has supposed links to Stanley Kubrick.

== Recovery of footage ==
The film (long believed to be lost) was recovered by James Fenwick. No evidence of Stanley Kubrick's involvement was present in the film or scripts, though historian Nicholas Morrish has found evidence of a second WAY film mentioned in State Department records.

John Baxter found limited evidence of Stanley Kubrick's involvement: an early résumé sent by Kubrick to veteran New York film critic Theodore Huff in February 1953, though no physical or photographic evidence of such a résumé exists. In the résumé and cover letter, Kubrick lists working on this film alongside his other documentaries, The Seafarers, Day of the Fight, and Flying Padre. The résumé was uncovered by John Baxter while doing research for his own book, Stanley Kubrick: A Biography (1997).

A June 1952 article in The New York Times was also evidence by Baxter of Kubrick's involvement; the news article states, "The youthful producer-director, whose credits already include “The Day of the Fight” and “Flying Padre”, short subjects released by R.K.O., and a short on World Assembly of Youth, made for the State Department, has “a few stories he would like to film.”

== Synopsis ==
Hundreds of delegates from 65 countries arrived in Ithaca, New York, between August 6 and 16, 1951, to attend a Youth Assembly conference, the conference itself being held at Cornell University. The WAY representatives' first stop on their tour of New York was at Hyde Park, New York, the estate of Eleanor Roosevelt. There, a brief lunch was arranged and discussions were held by various reps. A short ceremony was held, with a representative from Japan placing a floral arrangement by FDR's grave. They arrived later that day at Ithaca, and began their stay in the US.

The WAY event itself though was based entirely around the formation of a Universal Declaration of Human Rights, the film showing that day in and day out, most of the goals of the conference were meant to solidify a resolution for the UN. After workshops during the day, the evenings held events that included exhibits of modern paintings, speakers (one of such being Eleanor Roosevelt), performances by the NBC Symphony Orchestra, and the first recording and performance of the New York City Ballet rendition of Swan Lake under George Balanchine which would not premiere officially until November 1951.

== Production ==
Historian Nicholas Morrish found information from the American Heritage Center, University of Wyoming in part due to a script found in the Richard De Rochemont collection. The script is dated February 12, 1952, and from Department of State records; the film was dated for release on July 1, 1952.
