= David Vaughan (dance archivist) =

British dance archivist, historian and critic (1924–2017)

David Vaughan

David Vaughan (May 17, 1924 – October 27, 2017) was a dance archivist, historian and critic. He was the archivist of the Merce Cunningham Dance Company from 1976 until the company was disbanded in 2012.

In his long career, Vaughan was a dancer, choreographer, actor and singer whose work had been seen in London, Paris, and in New York, both on- and off-Broadway, as well as in regional theatres across the United States, in cabarets, on television and on film. Vaughan's ballet choreography was used in Stanley Kubrick's 1955 film Killer's Kiss, danced by Kubrick's wife at the time, ballerina Ruth Sobotka. He has worked with both modern dance and ballet companies.

== Life and career ==
Vaughan was born in London, to Albert, who was the secretary of the British Linoleum Manufacturers’ Association, and Ada Rose (née Stocks). He studied at Oxford, but did not begin dance training until he was 23 years old.

At the age of 26, in 1950, Vaughan came to the New York City from London on a scholarship to study at the School of American Ballet, where he first met Merce Cunningham, who briefly taught there. Vaughan began studying with Cunningham in the mid-1950s, and became the company's paid secretary when Cunningham opened his own studio, after which he served in various staff capacities with Cunningham. He began to collect dance artifacts in the late 1950s, leading to an interest in collecting documentation to make a chronology of Cunningham's works. This resulted in his being formally made the company's archivist in 1976, assisted by a grant from the National Endowment for the Arts. He was the first in-house archivist for an American dance company. He held this position until the disbanding of the Merce Cunningham Company in 2012, after Cunningham's death in 2009. The Cunningham archive was then donated to the dance collection of the New York Public Library for the Performing Arts at Lincoln Center.

At Cunningham's suggestion, Vaughan coordinated the Cunningham Company's 1964 six-month world tour to Europe and Asia, with composer John Cage serving as music director, and artist Robert Rauschenberg as resident designer and stage manager, a tour which greatly enhanced the company's reputation in the dance world.

In 1988, after The Rockettes hired their first black dancer, Vaughan wrote an opinion piece for The New York Times criticizing major ballet companies for falling behind other types of cultural organizations in giving artists of color regular opportunities to perform because of long-held ideas about the need for uniformity among dancers on stage. He observed that, "ballet technique has always accommodated itself to human bodies in all their variety".

Both Vaughan and Cunningham took part in the Westbeth Oral History Project of the Greenwich Village Society for Historic Preservation, since the Merce Cunningham Dance Company's studio was located in the complex. They were interviewed in 2007.

=== Theatre ===
Vaughan was active in the theatre, both on- and off-Broadway. Between 1958 and 1972, he appeared in six productions off-Broadway, including The Fantasticks and The Boy Friend, and created choreography for three productions. He also arranged the music for a production of The Cherry Orchard. He made his Broadway debut in 1957 in a production of The Country Wife, and subsequently appeared in four other productions, including a transfer of The Boy Friend from off-Broadway, his last Broadway appearance, in 1970.

=== Film ===
Vaughan's film credits include creating the ballet choreography danced by Ruth Sobotka in Stanley Kubrick's film Killer's Kiss (1955). Vaughan also appeared in the film in a bit part. His film writing credits include the 1991 film Cage/Cunningham, about the long-time collaborators John Cage and Merce Cunningham, and A Tudor Evening with American Ballet Theatre, a presentation of the choreography of Antony Tudor.

Vaughan hosted monthly film screenings at the New York Public Library for the Performing Arts.

=== Dance ===
Vaughan narrated Frederick Ashton's 1937 ballet A Wedding Bouquet, speaking the words of Gertrude Stein. In 1968, he performed a duet with Nancy Zala for the James Waring Dance Company, which provoked critic Clive Barnes to call Vaughan "possibly the finest bad singer in the country". Vaughan also played the Pope, via photographs and audio recordings, in David Gordon's 1979 piece An Audience With the Pope (Or This is Where I Came In). More recently, in 2016 he appeared in the Brooklyn Touring Outfit's Co. Venture in a "storytelling duet" with Pepper Fajans, the founding director of the Brooklyn Studios for Dance, about Vaughan's friendship with Cunningham. The production travelled to the Montreal Fringe Festival.

== Works ==
As an author, Vaughan wrote Merce Cunningham: Fifty Years, – which Jennifer Dunning called "as complete and clear a portrait of the modern dance choreographer and his epochal work as has ever been published" – Frederick Ashton and His Ballets, and was the co-editor with Mary Clarke of The Encyclopedia of Dance and Ballet. He also contributed the introduction to The Royal Ballet at Covent Garden. At the time of his death, Vaughan was completing a book about the choreographer James Waring.

Vaughan was also a frequent contributor to Ballet Review, beginning with its first issue in 1965.

== Awards and honors ==
In 2000 Vaughan received the Congress on Research in Dance (CORD) Award for Outstanding Leadership in Dance Research, and in 2001 a Bessie Award for sustained achievement. He was also a recipient of a 2015 Dance Magazine Award.

== Personal life and death ==
Vaughan was the older brother of journalist and voiceover actor Paul Vaughan, who died in 2014. David Vaughan died from complications of prostate cancer in his home in Manhattan, New York City in 2017.

== See also ==
- Modern dance
- Dance criticism
