= Silvera =

Silvera is a surname. Notable people with the surname include:

- Adam Silvera (born 1990), American author
- Al Silvera (1935–2002), American baseball player
- Allan Silvera (born 1895, date of death unknown), Jamaican cricketer
- Ana Silvera, English singer-songwriter, instrumentalist, and composer
- Andrés Silvera (born 1977), Argentine football Silvera
- C. Silvera (1935–2016), Indian doctor and politician
- Carmen Silvera (1922–2002), British comic actress
- César Fernando Silvera Fontela (born 1971), Uruguayan football player
- Charlie Silvera (1924–2019), American baseball player and coach
- Damian Silvera (1974–2010), American soccer player
- Darrell Silvera (1900–1993), American set decorator
- Facundo Silvera (born 1997), Uruguayan football player
- Facundo Silvera (born 2001), Uruguayan football player
- Federica Silvera (born 1993), Uruguayan football and futsal player
- Frank Silvera (1914–1970), Jamaican-born American character actor and theatre director
- Joey Silvera (born 1951), American director and pornographic actor
- Laurie Silvera (born 1939), Canadian racehorse trainer
- Makeda Silvera (born 1955), Jamaican-Canadian author
- Nesta Jade Silvera (born 2000), American football player
- Roberto Silvera (born 1971), Uruguayan football referee
- Samuel Silvera (born 2000), Australian football player
- Simoncito Silvera (born 1982), Venezuelan athlete
- Yari Silvera (born 1976), Uruguayan football player
