= Bob Hite (announcer) =

American announcer

Bob Hite Sr. (February 9, 1914 in Decatur, Indiana – February 18, 2000 in West Palm Beach, Florida) was an American radio and television announcer, voice-over artist, and news anchor.

== Biography ==
Hite began his announcing career in the 1930s at WXYZ in Detroit, Michigan. During his years there, he was among the announcers for such old-time radio shows as The Lone Ranger, The Green Hornet, The Shadow, and Challenge of the Yukon.

In 1944, Hite joined the New York announcing staff of CBS. His radio announcing credits for the network included Let's Pretend, Casey, Crime Photographer, and The CBS Radio Workshop. On VE Day, Bob Hite was the first of CBS staff to announce the Victory in Europe, on airwaves from coast to coast. After World War II, Hite was seen live on the fledgling medium of television as a spokesman for GE appliances of all kinds, performing live commercials on the Fred Waring Show. During those early years of television, Hite was an anchor of five-minute morning news updates for the local CBS flagship station, WCBS-TV; at one point, he was paired with fellow announcer Peter Thomas on those newscasts. Also during that time frame he solo-anchored the local/metropolitan evening news casts as well. In the early and mid-1950s, Hite was the narrator of several short films for RKO Pictures, including one of Stanley Kubrick's early works, Flying Padre.

Bob Hite announced the opening bumper for CBS's color programs starting in 1966, replacing fellow staff announcer Hal Simms who had voiced the same bumper the year before. But his most famous television credit was as the announcer for the CBS Evening News with Walter Cronkite beginning in 1970, and continuing until his retirement from the network in 1979.

Hite died in February 2000 at a hospice in West Palm Beach, Florida at age 86.

His son, Bob Hite Jr., was senior anchor at WFLA-TV in Tampa-St. Petersburg, Florida from 1977 until his retirement in November 2007. One of his three daughters, Cindy Hite, also worked in radio news and is now a weekend radio host at Legends Radio 100.3 FM in Palm Beach County, FL.
