= The Cage (ballet) =

Ballet premiered in 1951

- Choreographer: Jerome Robbins
- Music: Igor Stravinsky
- Libretto: Jerome Robbins
- Premiere: June 10, 1951; City Center of Music and Drama
- Original ballet company: New York City Ballet
- Design: Ruth Sobotka; Jean Rosenthal
- Created for: Nora Kaye

The Cage is a ballet choreographed by Jerome Robbins to Stravinsky's Concerto in D. The ballet depicts a tribe of female insects that preys on their male counterparts, in which the Novice falls in love with a male intruder, before being overcome by her animal instincts to kill him. The Cage was made for the New York City Ballet, and premiered on June 10, 1951, at the City Center of Music and Drama, with Nora Kaye as the Novice.

== Plot ==
Among a tribe of female insect that preys on their male counterparts, The Novice, the daughter of The Queen, is born, and her membranous covering is removed. She is confronted by the First Intruder, a male insect, and she reflexively stabs him and cracks his neck until he dies. The tribe celebrates that she has been initiated. The Second Intruder appears, and this time the tribe leave her to kill him. However, the two fall in love and mate. The tribe returns and the couple attempts to hide, but are discovered. The tribe attacks the Second Intruder, and finally, the Novice is overcome by animal instincts and kills him. The Novice is embraced by the Queen, while the rest of the tribe salutes her.

== Original cast ==
Roles	Dancers
The Novice	Nora Kaye
The Queen	Yvonne Mounsey
The First Intruder	Michael Maule
The Second Intruder	Nicholas Magallanes

== Production ==
Two years before Robbins began working on the ballet, he discovered Stravinsky's Concerto in D on the flip side of a recording of Apollon Musagète. He found it "terribly driven, coerced, compelled." He originally envisioned Tanaquil Le Clercq to star in the ballet to the concerto. Previously, nearly all of Stravinsky ballets at the New York City Ballet were choreographed by George Balanchine. Inspired by the sexuality Le Clercq showcased in Balanchine's Orpheus, his original plan for the ballet was about the Amazons in Greek mythology, tentatively titled The Amazons, and would be a part of a trilogy alongside Balanchine's Apollo and Orpheus. Robbins searched for Greek mythology about the Amazons. The plot of the ballet would be a reversal of the killing of Hippolyta by Hercules, with the woman, rather than the man, to be the killer.

Robbins choreographed the opening of The Amazons, but disliked it. He then suspended his work on the ballet and took time away from the New York City Ballet to focus on his work on the musical The King and I. During this period of time, he discovered a book about spiders and realised that he "did not have to confine myself to human beings moving in a way that we know is human," and started researching on human cult rituals, animal and insect societies, and visited the zoo to observe tigers. He renamed the ballet The Cage, now about female insects that prey on their male counterparts.

While Robbins was away, Le Clercq was so successful in originating the lead role in Balanchine's La Valse that Balanchine did not want her to work on the Robbins ballet. Robbins returned to the company in spring 1951 on the ballet. For his new female lead, he chose Nora Kaye, for her "terrific drive and forcefulness and difference of personality." Kaye was not a member of the company when Robbins first conceived the ballet. After she joined the company, she had not been given the opportunity to showcase her talents in drama. Years later, Robbins wrote of Kaye's performance, "She didn't ever play human or have human responses. She was much more terrifying & unearthly. She performed the role quietly. With a beetle's eyes & no expression. As one cannot read into [the] eyes or thinking [of] an insect she remained appalling in her surrenders, instincts and actions – an extraordinary creature – not a ballerina doing ketchy movements."

Robbins' process on the ballet was uncharacteristically smooth. In the choreography, he took inspiration from the animals he researched on, as well as Thai and Balinese court dancing, which he studied when he worked on The King and I. The corps de ballet took some time to understand how they are supposed to be ugly and contorted. Yvonne Mounsey, who originated the role of the Queen, noted that Robbins was "a bit rough" with the corps. As soon as they understood it, Robbins described that "they went ahead like wildfire." Mounsey, who trained as a gymnast, did not have trouble with the steps and was able to execute what Robbins requested quickly.

The costumes of the ballet were designed by Ruth Sobotka, at the time a dancer at the company. Though she was already a registered member of United Scenic Artists, The Cage marked the first time she worked as a designer in New York. The dancers are dressed in nude-colored leotards with black curly lines. The set and lighting was by Jean Rosenthal. The decor features spiderwebs of ropes hanging from the ceiling, which was added by accident, when Rosenthal was lowering an overhead web after a stage rehearsal, and Robbins requested her to add the ropes to the set.

== Performances ==
The Cage premiered on June 10, 1951, at the City Center of Music and Drama. Though most audience erupted into cheers after the performance, some of the audience was offended by the ballet, and Robbins' mother walked out of the theatre halfway through the ballet.

On the New York City Ballet's European tour in 1952, there was an attempt to ban The Cage, which a Dutch dance critic described as "pornographic", in The Hague. After Robbins said he would withdraw all his works from the tour, and Kaye threatened to not perform during the tour, the Dutch officials allowed it to be performed.

In 1961, The Cage entered the repertory of Ballets: USA, Robbins company, during what would become the company's last season.

In 1972, The Cage was included in the New York City Ballet's Stravinsky Festival, a tribute to the composer a year after his death.

Other ballet companies that have performed the ballet include Birmingham Royal Ballet, San Francisco Ballet, the Australian Ballet and English National Ballet.

== Critical reception ==
Following the premiere, John Martin of the New York Times commented, "It is an angry, sparse, unsparing piece, decadent in its concern with misogyny and its contempt for procreation. It dodges no issues, but cuts to the heart of the matter with sharp and steely thrusts. Its characters are insects, it is without heart or conscience. But in spite of the potency of its negations, it is a tremendous little work, with the mark of genius upon it."

== Videography ==
In 1980, The Cage was among several of Robbins' work that was filmed for NBC's series Live from Studio 8H, with Heather Watts as the Novice, Florence Fitzgerald as the Queen, Robert Maiorano as the First Intruder, and Bart Cook as the Second Intruder.
