= Influence of Stanley Kubrick =

Impact of American filmmaker

Part of the New Hollywood era of cinema, Kubrick's films are considered by film historian Michel Ciment to be "among the most important contributions to world cinema in the twentieth century", and he is frequently cited as one of the greatest and most influential directors in the history of cinema. According to film historian and Kubrick scholar Robert Kolker, Kubrick's films were "more intellectually rigorous than the work of any other American filmmaker."

== The term "Kubrickian" ==
The term Kubrickian is described as having meticulous perfectionism, mastering of the technical aspects of film-making and atmospheric visual style.

Orson Welles, one of Kubrick's strongest personal influences, famously said: "Among those whom I would call 'younger generation', Kubrick appears to me to be a giant."

== Influence ==
Innumerous leading directors, including David Fincher, Christopher Nolan, Gaspar Noé, Michael Mann, Lars von Trier, and George A. Romero, have cited Kubrick as a source of inspiration, and in the case of Spielberg, collaboration. In an interview for the Eyes Wide Shut DVD release, Steven Spielberg comments that "nobody could shoot a picture better in history", and that Kubrick told stories in a way "antithetical to the way we are accustomed to receiving stories". Writing in the introduction to a recent edition of Michel Ciment's Kubrick, film director Martin Scorsese notes most of Kubrick's films were misunderstood and under-appreciated when first released, only to be considered masterpieces later on.

Many filmmakers imitate Kubrick's inventive and unique use of camera movement and framing. For example, several of Jonathan Glazer's music videos contain visual references to Kubrick. The Coen Brothers' Barton Fink, in which the hotel itself seems malevolent, contains a hotel hallway Steadicam shot as an homage to The Shining. The storytelling style of their Hudsucker Proxy was influenced by Dr. Strangelove. Director Tim Burton has included a few visual homages to Kubrick in his work, notably using actual footage from 2001: A Space Odyssey in Charlie and the Chocolate Factory, and modeling the look of Tweedledee and Tweedledum in his version of Alice in Wonderland on the Grady girls in The Shining. Film critic Roger Ebert also noted that Burton's Mars Attacks! was partially inspired by Dr. Strangelove. The video for The Killers' song "Bones" that Burton directed includes clips from Kubrick's Lolita, as well as other films from the general era. Satyajit Ray, an Indian film director and screenwriter, greatly admired the works of Stanley Kubrick, calling him a great technician. In his words: 'I am fascinated by what he does all the time because he is a superb technician, not that his subject matter greatly appealed to me.'

Kubrick's influence on Todd Field was perhaps the most direct. After acting in Kubrick's Eyes Wide Shut, Field immediately went on to make In the Bedroom.

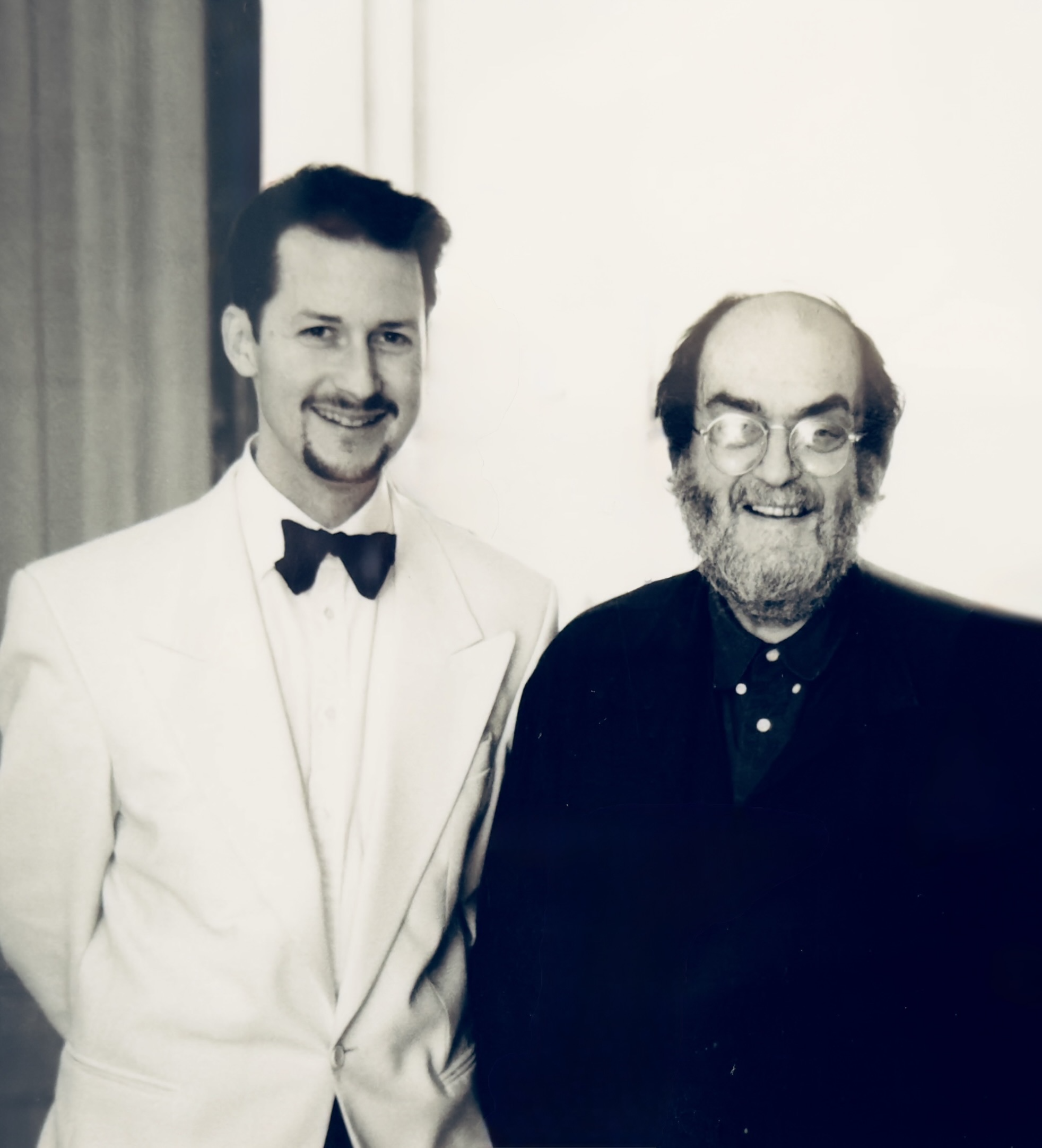
Field & Kubrick at Highclere Castle between takes on Eyes Wide Shut

William Arnold, in reviewing the film, wrote:

Like Kubrick, Field's direction manages to feel both highly controlled and effortlessly spontaneous at the same time; and his lifting of the facade of this picturesque, Norman Rockwell setting is carried out with surgical precision ... also like Kubrick, Field doesn't make any moral judgments about his characters, and his film remains stubbornly enigmatic. It can be read as a high-class revenge thriller, an ode to the futility of vengeance or almost anything in between.

In January 2002 Field cited Kubrick as an important inspiration:

He confirmed a lot of things for me about the process of making a film… single-mindedness… trusting your script, not trying to make everybody love it.

Although Michael Moore specializes in documentary filmmaking, at the beginning of shooting his only non-documentary feature film Canadian Bacon, he sat his cast and crew down to watch Kubrick's Dr. Strangelove. He told them, "What this movie was in the '60s, is what we should aspire to with this film." Moore had previously written Kubrick a letter telling him how much Bacon was inspired by Strangelove.

== Use of music ==
Paul Thomas Anderson (who was fond of Kubrick as a teenager) in an interview with Entertainment Weekly, stated "it's so hard to do anything that doesn't owe some kind of debt to what Stanley Kubrick did with music in movies. Inevitably, you're going to end up doing something that he's probably already done before. It can all seem like we're falling behind whatever he came up with." Reviewer William Arnold described Anderson's There Will Be Blood as a stylistic homage to Kubrick, "particularly 2001: A Space Odyssey -- opening with a similar prologue that jumps in stages over the years and using a soundtrack throughout that employs anachronistic music."

Film director Frank Darabont has been inspired by Kubrick's use of music. In an interview with The Telegraph, he states that 2001 took "the use of music in film" to absolute perfection, and one shot employing classical music in The Shawshank Redemption follows Kubrick's lead. On the other hand, while Darabont has followed Kubrick in directing two Stephen King adaptations, Darabont shares Stephen King's negative view of Kubrick's adaption of The Shining and claims that 2001 is his greatest film.

Critics occasionally detect a Kubrickian influence when the filmmaker acknowledges none. Critics have noticed the influence of Stanley Kubrick on Danish independent director Nicolas Winding Refn. Jim Pappas suggests this comes from Refn's employment of Kubrick's cinematographer for Eyes Wide Shut in his film Fear X, suggesting "it is the Kubrick influence that leaves us asking ourselves what we believe we should know is true". The apparent influence of Kubrick on his film Bronson was noted by the Los Angeles Times and the French publication Evene When asked by Twitch about the very frequent comparisons by critics of the film Bronson to A Clockwork Orange, Refn denied the influence. Refn stated

Of course if you put violence with classical music, people think it's obvious that's Clockwork Orange, because Kubrick used it very well and you always look at it as a reference. There are similarities between my Bronson and the Alex character from Clockwork Orange. There is kind of anti-authoritarian popculture iconish quality, but I stole every single thing from Kenneth Anger. Bronson is a mixture of [Anger's] Inauguration of the Pleasure Dome (1954) and Scorpio Rising (1964).

Kubrick's direction has impacted the field of rock music as well. American rock group the Byrds were inspired to cover Vera Lynn's "We'll Meet Again" for their album Mr. Tambourine Man after hearing the song's use in Dr. Strangelove.

== Homages ==
In 2000 BAFTA renamed their Britannia lifetime achievement award the "Stanley Kubrick Britannia Award". Kubrick is among filmmakers such as D. W. Griffith, Laurence Olivier, Cecil B. DeMille, and Irving Thalberg, all of whom have had annual awards named after them. Kubrick won this award in 1999, and subsequent recipients have included George Lucas, Warren Beatty, Tom Cruise, Robert De Niro, Clint Eastwood, and Daniel Day-Lewis.

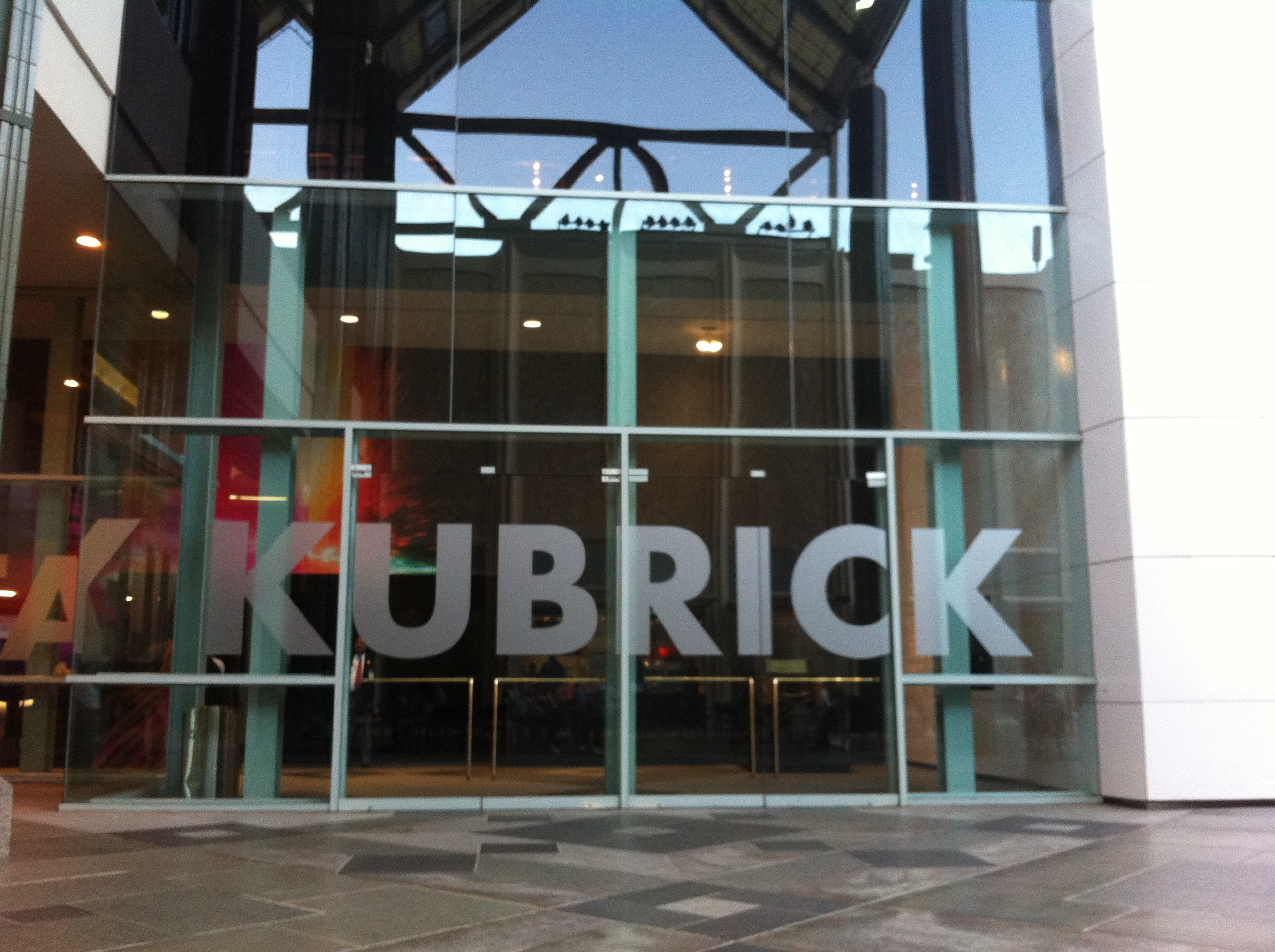
Entrance to Kubrick museum exhibit at LACMA

A number of people who worked with Kubrick on his films created the 2001 documentary Stanley Kubrick: A Life in Pictures, produced and directed by Kubrick's brother-in-law, Jan Harlan, who had executive produced Kubrick's last four films. The film's chapters each cover one of Kubrick's films, and Kubrick's childhood is explored in the introductory section.

=== Stanley Kubrick travelling exhibition ===
For nearly twenty years, an exhibition devoted to Kubrick has circulated from city to city around the world. Exhibits include a wide collection of documents, photographs and on-set material assembled from 800 boxes of personal archives that were stored in Kubrick's home-workplace in the U.K, as well as items custom built for the exhibition. The collection, curated by Deutsches Filminstitut and Deutsches Architekturmuseum, was first displayed in Frankfurt am Main, Germany in 2004; followed by Berlin (2005); Melbourne, Australia (2006); Ghent, Belgium, and Zurich, Switzerland (both in 2007); Rome, Italy (2008); Paris, France (2011); and Amsterdam, Netherlands (2012), and Los Angeles (October 2012 to June 2013).

In L.A., a number of celebrities attended and spoke at the museum's pre-opening gala, including Steven Spielberg, Tom Hanks and Jack Nicholson, while Kubrick's widow, Christiane, appeared at the pre-gala press review. A week after it opened at the Los Angeles County Museum of Art (LACMA) on November 7, the Academy of Motion Picture Arts and Sciences celebrated Kubrick's life and career in conjunction with the exhibition. Malcolm McDowell hosted, and along with other actors, including Paul Mazursky, Ryan O'Neal and Matthew Modine, discussed personal experiences of working with Kubrick.

The show then travelled to Brazil in conjunction with the São Paulo International Film Festival in October 2013, which paid tribute to Kubrick, staging an exhibit of his work and a retrospective of his films. It next travelled to Krakow, Poland (May-September 2014), and the Toronto International Film Festival (TIFF) in late 2014, running to January 2015. Succeeding exhibitions, typically continuing for about six months at a time, were held in Monterrey, Mexico (March to July 2016), Seoul, Korea (November 2014 to March 2016), San Francisco (June to October 2016), Mexico City (December 2016 to July 2017), Copenhagen (September 2017 to January 2018), Frankfurt, Germany (March to September 2018), Barcelona, Spain (October 2018 to March 2019), New York City (January 2020 to October 2021, including a pause for Covid-19), Madrid, Spain (December 2021 to May 2022) and Istanbul, Turkey (September 2022 to March 2023).

== Rankings ==
In 1996, Entertainment Weekly ranked Kubrick at No. 23 in its "50 Greatest Directors" list. MovieMaker magazine ranked him at No. 6 on their 2002 list of The 25 Most Influential Directors of All Time. Kubrick was ranked 8th in director's poll on Sight & Sound's 2002 list of The Greatest Directors of All Time. Kubrick was ranked at No. 4 on Empire magazine's "Top 40 Greatest Directors of All-Time" list in 2005. In 2007, Total Film magazine ranked Kubrick at No. 8 on its "100 Greatest Film Directors Ever" list.

== In popular culture ==
The TV series The Simpsons is said to contain more references to Kubrick films than any other pop culture phenomenon. References abound to many of his films, including 2001, A Clockwork Orange, and The Shining. When the Directors Guild of Great Britain gave Kubrick a lifetime achievement award, they included a cut-together sequence of all the homages from the show. Kubrick's films had also been parodied, influenced and/or referenced in other TV shows like Seinfeld, South Park, Malcolm in the Middle, The Sopranos, The Wire, Family Guy, The Fairly OddParents, American Dad!, Breaking Bad, Mad Men, It's Always Sunny in Philadelphia, and many others.

In 2009, an exhibition of paintings and photos inspired by Kubrick's films was held in Dublin, Ireland, entitled 'Stanley Kubrick: Taming Light'. In 2010, painter (and film storyboard artist) Carlos Ramos held an exhibition entitled "Kubrick" in Los Angeles, featuring paintings in a variety of styles based on scenes from Stanley Kubrick films.

The 2005 Jim Carrey comedy film Fun with Dick and Jane refers several times to an all-important "CRM-114" form. CRM 114, or variations, is an "easter egg" in several Kubrick films, such as Dr. Strangelove.

Abel Tesfaye, also known as 'The Weeknd', is an avid cinephile and has been known to integrate cinema into his music. He too has expressed an admiration for Stanley Kubrick by citing him as an artistic influence; he has constantly referenced his work in his music videos such as "Call Out My Name" and "Save Your Tears."

Among her multiple allusions to Kubrick in song and video, pop singer Lady Gaga's video for "Bad Romance" appeared to pay homage to Kubrick, and her concert shows have included the use of dialogue, costumes, and music from A Clockwork Orange. He was also mentioned in her song "Dance in the Dark", alongside other famous people who died tragically, like Jesus and JonBenet Ramsey. Her concert shows have included the use of dialogue, costumes, and music from A Clockwork Orange.

The music video for Kanye West's 2010 song "Runaway" was inspired by Eyes Wide Shut.

British trance/techno group Juno Reactor had a song from their album, Shango, which used a sample based on the Star Gate scene from 2001: A Space Odyssey.

American heavy metal band Slipknot had paid homage to The Shining with the music video of their song, "Spit it Out", directed by Thomas Mignone, where it consists of conceptual imagery of the bandmates each portraying characters enacting iconic scenes from the film, with Joey Jordison as Danny Torrance; Shawn Crahan and Chris Fehn as the Grady twins; Corey Taylor as Jack Torrance; Mick Thomson as Lloyd the Bartender; Craig Jones as Dick Hallorann; James Root as Wendy Torrance; Paul Gray as Harry Derwent; and Sid Wilson as the corpse in the bathtub. The video was banned from MTV for overtly graphic and violent depictions, including Corey Taylor's smashing through a door with an axe and the scene wherein James Root viciously assaults Corey Taylor with a baseball bat. Mignone and the band eventually re-edited a less violent version, which was subsequently aired on MTV.

American heavy metal band Mudvayne also paid tribute to The Shining with their 2007 song, "Dull Boy" right from its opening hook being the quote, "all work and no play makes me a dull boy." Frontman and singer Chad Gray is also a fan of Kubrick as the song was written as a tribute and homage to him as well as Stephen King, the original author of novel.

American metalcore band Ice Nine Kills released a song celebrating the 37th anniversary of The Shining, entitled "Enjoy Your Slay". The song is based on the film adaptation of The Shining and features Kubrick's grandson, Sam, as a guest vocalist.

American indie rock band Car Seat Headrest, at the time a solo project of frontman Will Toledo, the 2011 recording of Twin Fantasy makes a reference to Kubrick's final film Eyes Wide Shut on the song Cute Thing. This would be changed in the re-recording in 2018.

In 2023, the Stanley Kubrick Estate announced that actor Steve Coogan would be playing the leading roles in a West End adadaption of the film, Dr.Strangelove, scheduled to open in October 2024.

== Films about elements of Kubrick's life ==
In the early 1990s, a con artist named Alan Conway frequented the London entertainment scene claiming to be Stanley Kubrick, and temporarily deceived New York Times theatre critic Frank Rich, as well as multiple aspiring actors. Kubrick's personal assistant, Anthony Frewin, who helped track Conway down, wrote the screenplay for a film based on the Conway affair Colour Me Kubrick, starring John Malkovich as Alan Conway. Kubrick's widow, Christiane Kubrick, was also a consultant for the film. The film contains several tongue-in-cheek homages to scenes from Kubrick's films. Conway was earlier the subject of the short documentary film The Man Who Would be Kubrick.

Kubrick was portrayed on film by actor Stanley Tucci in the film The Life and Death of Peter Sellers. Although Sellers acted in two of Kubrick's films, the material here is almost wholly focused on their work together in Dr. Strangelove.

In 2012, the documentary film Room 237 was released, which speculates about overt and hidden meanings behind The Shining. The film includes footage from that and other Kubrick films, along with discussions by a number of Kubrick experts. The film includes nine segments, with each segment focusing on different elements within the film which "may reveal hidden clues and hint at a bigger thematic oeuvre."

In 2017, Filmworker was released, which was a documentary about Leon Vitali, an actor first cast in Kubrick's Barry Lyndon. Vitali would become a friend and frequent collaborator to the director on his subsequent films as his assistant. The film explores his friendship and working relationship with Kubrick.

== Sources ==
- Ciment, Michel (1980). Kubrick: The Definitive Edition. Faber and Faber, Inc.
- Debolt, Abbe A.; Baugess, James S. (2011). Encyclopedia of the Sixties: A Decade of Culture and Counterculture. ABC-CLIO. ISBN 978-1-4408-0102-0.
