= Howard Sackler =

American dramatist

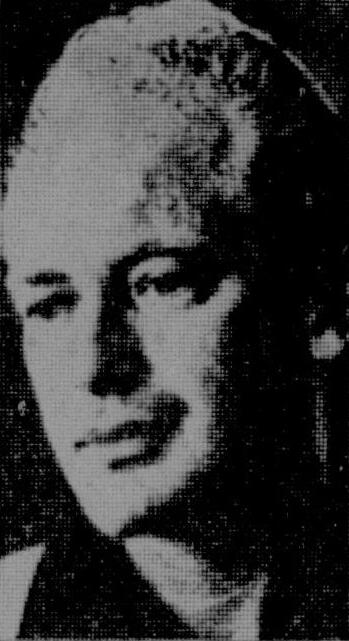
- Sackler in 1969
- Born: Howard Oliver Sackler; December 19, 1929; Brooklyn, New York, United States
- Died: 12 October 1982 (aged 52); Ibiza, Spain
- Citizenship: United States
- Occupations: Playwright, screenwriter
- Writing career
- Language: English
- Genres: Theatre, screenwriting

Howard Oliver Sackler (December 19, 1929 – October 12, 1982) was an American screenwriter and playwright who is best known for having written The Great White Hope and its film adaptation. The Great White Hope enjoyed both a successful run on Broadway and, as a film adaptation, in movie theaters. James Earl Jones and Jane Alexander both starred in the original Arena Stage production of the play in Washington, D.C., then brought their roles to Broadway and later to the film version. Both Jones and Alexander received Academy Award nominations for their work in the movie.

== Early life and career ==
Born in Brooklyn, the son of real estate agent Martin and Ida (née Moshman) Sackler, and a graduate of Brooklyn College, Sackler was the recipient of many awards and grants including both a Pulitzer Prize (1969), a Tony Award for Drama (1969), and a New York Drama Critics Circle Award for The Great White Hope. Prior to this, Sackler won the Maxwell Anderson Award (1954) and Chicago's Sergel Award. In addition, he was the recipient of grants from both the Rockefeller Foundation and the Littauer Foundation. The original production for The Great White Hope, produced at Arena Stage in Washington, DC, was substantially funded by two grants from the National Endowment for the Arts. The Broadway production, however, was funded, at least in part, by Sackler himself using $225,000 from his screenwriting proceeds for the film version.

Sackler's work encompassed many other films and plays including the play Goodbye Fidel in 1980 and Jaws 2 in 1978, as well as Stanley Kubrick's first two feature films Fear and Desire in 1953 and 1955's Killer's Kiss. His filmography also includes Gray Lady Down (1978) and Saint Jack (1979), which he co-wrote with Paul Theroux for Peter Bogdanovich. Sackler was also responsible for an uncredited rewrite of Peter Benchley's script for Jaws (1975), and conceived of Quint's "Indianapolis" monologue about the sinking of USS Indianapolis during World War II.

Sackler's plays have been produced throughout the United States, Europe, and South America. He also directed over 200 recordings for Caedmon Audio, various theater productions, and the LP version of an NBC television special entitled Shakespeare: Soul of an Age. His Caedmon productions included a vivid 1968 recording of John Dos Passos' 42nd Parallel.

== Family ==
Sackler was married and had two children.

== Death ==
On October 12, 1982, Sackler was found dead in his studio in Ibiza, Spain, where he lived for the better part of the year. Sackler was working on Klondike, a farcical play about the Klondike Gold Rush, when he died.
