= List of accolades received by Stanley Kubrick =

Stanley Kubrick awards and nominations
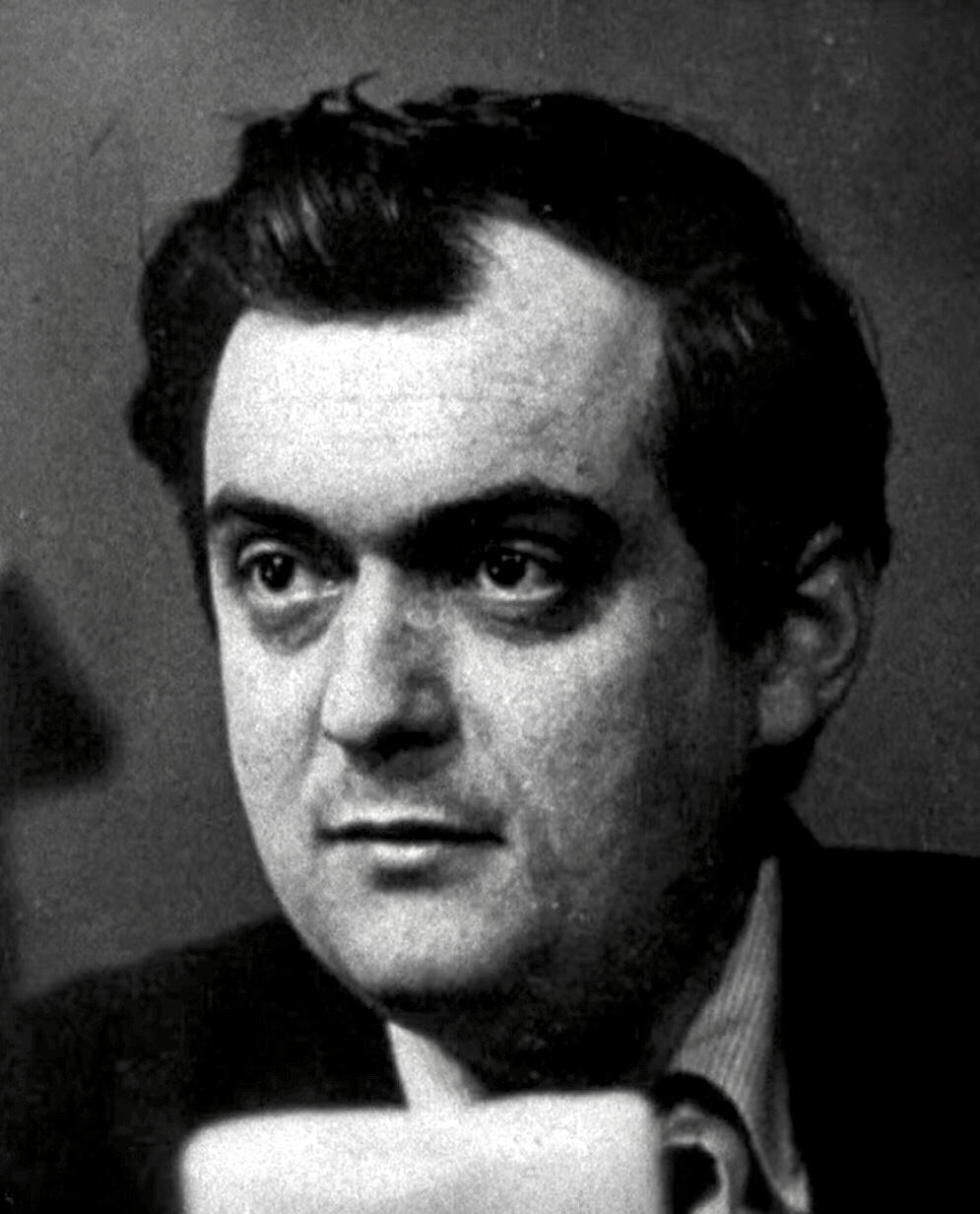
- Kubrick in 1964
Awards and nominations
Award	Wins	Nominations
Academy Awards	1	13
British Academy Film Awards	3	11
Golden Globe Awards	0	4
Directors Guild of America Awards	0	5
Writers Guild of America Awards	1	5

Totals (Note: Certain award groups do not simply award one winner. They acknowledge several different recipients, have runners-up, and have third place. Since this is a specific recognition and is different from losing an award, runner-up mentions are considered wins in this award tally. For simplification and to avoid errors, each award in this list has been presumed to have had a prior nomination.)
- Wins: 8
- Nominations: 33

Stanley Kubrick (1928–1999) was an American filmmaker. During his career he received various accolades, including an Academy Award, three BAFTA Awards, and a Writers Guild of America Award, in addition to nominations for four Golden Globe Awards and five Directors Guild of America Awards. Kubrick also was awarded with the D. W. Griffith Award in 1997, the Britannia Award in 1999, and posthumously the BAFTA Fellowship in 2000.

== Academy Awards ==
Year	Category	Nominated work	Result	Ref.
Academy Awards
1965	Best Picture	Dr. Strangelove	Nominated	
1965	Best Director	Dr. Strangelove	Nominated	
1965	Best Adapted Screenplay	Dr. Strangelove	Nominated	
1969	Best Director	2001: A Space Odyssey	Nominated	
1969	Best Original Screenplay	2001: A Space Odyssey	Nominated	
1969	Best Special Visual Effects	2001: A Space Odyssey	Won	
1972	Best Picture	A Clockwork Orange	Nominated	
1972	Best Director	A Clockwork Orange	Nominated	
1972	Best Adapted Screenplay	A Clockwork Orange	Nominated	
1976	Best Picture	Barry Lyndon	Nominated	
1976	Best Director	Barry Lyndon	Nominated	
1976	Best Adapted Screenplay	Barry Lyndon	Nominated	
1988	Best Adapted Screenplay	Full Metal Jacket	Nominated	

== BAFTA Awards ==
Year	Category	Nominated work	Result	Ref.
British Academy Film Awards
1957	Best Film from any Source	The Killing	Nominated	
1958	Best Film from any Source	Paths of Glory	Nominated	
1961	Best Film from any Source	Spartacus	Nominated	
1965	Best Film from any Source	Dr. Strangelove	Won	
1965	Best British Screenplay	Dr. Strangelove	Nominated	
1965	Best British Film	Dr. Strangelove	Won	
1969	Best Film	2001: A Space Odyssey	Nominated	
1973	Best Film	A Clockwork Orange	Nominated	
1973	Best Screenplay	A Clockwork Orange	Nominated	
1976	Best Film	Barry Lyndon	Nominated	
1976	Best Direction	Barry Lyndon	Won	
2000	Britannia Award Honoree for Excellence in Film	—N/a	Honored	
1999	BAFTA Fellowship	—N/a	Honored	

== Golden Globe Awards ==
Year	Category	Nominated work	Result	Ref.
Golden Globe Awards
1961	Best Director	Spartacus	Nominated	
1963	Best Director	Lolita	Nominated	
1972	Best Director	A Clockwork Orange	Nominated	
1976	Best Director	Barry Lyndon	Nominated	

== Hugo Awards ==
Year	Category	Nominated work	Result	Ref.
Hugo Awards
1965	Best Dramatic Presentation	Dr. Strangelove	Won	
1969	Best Dramatic Presentation	2001: A Space Odyssey	Won	
1972	Best Dramatic Presentation	A Clockwork Orange	Won	

== Awards and nominations received by Kubrick's films ==
Year	Film	Academy Awards		BAFTA Awards		Golden Globe Awards	
Year	Film	Nominations	Wins	Nominations	Wins	Nominations	Wins
1956	The Killing			1			
1957	Paths of Glory			1			
1960	Spartacus	6	4	1		6	1
1962	Lolita	1		1		5	1
1964	Dr. Strangelove	4		7	4		
1968	2001: A Space Odyssey	4	1	5	3		
1971	A Clockwork Orange	4		7		3	
1975	Barry Lyndon	7	4	5	2	2	
1987	Full Metal Jacket	1		2		1	
1999	Eyes Wide Shut					1	
Total		27	9	30	9	18	2

Directed Academy Award performances
Under Kubrick's direction, these actors have received Academy Award nominations (and one win) for their performances in their respective roles.

Year	Performer	Film	Result
Academy Award for Best Actor
1964	Peter Sellers	Dr. Strangelove	Nominated
Academy Award for Best Supporting Actor
1960	Peter Ustinov	Spartacus	Won
