= Fear and Desire =

1952 film by Stanley Kubrick

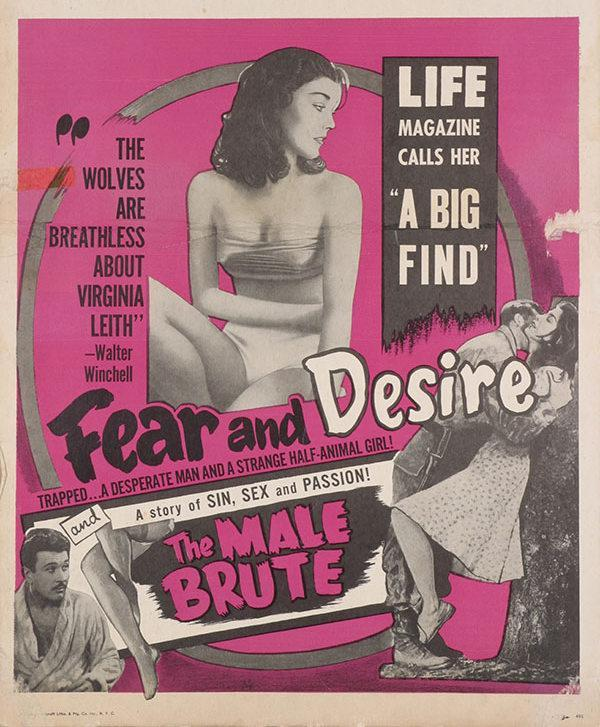
- Theatrical release poster
- Directed by: Stanley Kubrick
- Written by: Howard Sackler
- Produced by: Stanley Kubrick
- Starring: Frank Silvera; Paul Mazursky; Kenneth Harp; Steve Coit; Virginia Leith
- Narrated by: David Allen
- Cinematography: Stanley Kubrick
- Edited by: Stanley Kubrick
- Music by: Gerald Fried
- Distributed by: Joseph Burstyn
- Release dates: August 18, 1952 (Venice Film Festival); April 1, 1953 (U.S.)
- Running time: 70 minutes
- Country: United States
- Language: English
- Budget: $39,000–53,000

Fear and Desire is a 1952 American independent anti-war film directed, produced, and edited by Stanley Kubrick in his directorial debut, and written by Howard Sackler. With a production team of fifteen people, the film originally premiered at the Venice Film Festival, in a side program, under the title Shape of Fear. Though the film is not about any specific war, it was produced and released at the height of the Korean War. Kubrick famously disowned the film, and spent a large part of his career attempting to block any distribution of it.

== Plot ==
The full version of Fear and Desire

Fear and Desire opens with an off-screen narration by actor David Allen who tells the audience:

There is a war in this forest. Not a war that has been fought, nor one that will be, but any war. And the enemies who struggle here do not exist unless we call them into being. This forest then, and all that happens now is outside history. Only the unchanging shapes of fear and doubt and death are from our world. These soldiers that you see keep our language and our time, but have no other country but the mind.

The story is set during a war between two unidentified countries. An airplane carrying four soldiers from one country has crashed six miles behind enemy lines. The soldiers come upon a river and build a raft, hoping they can use the waterway to reach their battalion. They meet and befriend a dog, and then, as they are building their raft, spot a house a distance away. Using binoculars, they spot a general occupying the house. When they see a plane overhead they go further into the woods, come upon a small house with enemy soldiers eating, and break in to kill them for their food and rifles.

The next day they leave and are approached by a young peasant girl who does not speak their language. The soldiers apprehend the girl and bind her to a tree with their belts. The youngest of them, Sidney, is left behind to guard the girl. He starts to talk to her, but as she does not understand him, he descends into a state of delirium. When he unbelts her, believing she will embrace him, she tries to escape and Sidney shoots her dead. Mac, another of the four soldiers, finds the dead girl and Sidney, who has gone mad. Sidney runs off towards the river.

Mac persuades the commander, Lt. Corby, and Fletcher to let him take the raft for a solo voyage, and they plan to kill the enemy general at the nearby base. Mac distracts the general's guards by shooting at them while on the raft, and is himself wounded. While this is happening, Fletcher and Corby successfully infiltrate the base, kill the general, and use an enemy plane to escape to their home base. After landing, they talk and eat with their own general, and return to the river to await Mac. Sitting there, they philosophize about war and how no man is made for it, before finding the raft floating downriver, with a dying Mac and a delirious Sidney.

== Cast ==
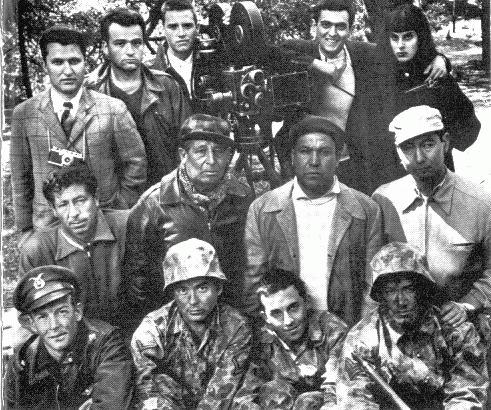
The film's cast and crew, c. February 1953 (without Virginia Leith, who was likely the photographer)

- David Allen as Narrator
- Frank Silvera as Sgt. Mac
- Kenneth Harp as Lt. Corby / The General
- Paul Mazursky as Pvt. Sidney
- Steve Coit as Pvt. Fletcher / The Captain
- Virginia Leith as The Girl

== Production ==
Prior to shooting Fear and Desire, Kubrick was a Look photographer who had directed two short documentaries in 1951, Day of the Fight and Flying Padre. Both films were acquired for theatrical release by RKO Radio Pictures. From his experiences in creating short films, Kubrick felt he was ready to make a narrative feature film. Kubrick quit his full-time job with Look and set forth to create Fear and Desire.

The screenplay was written by Howard Sackler, a classmate of Kubrick's at William Howard Taft High School in the Bronx, New York; Sackler later won the Pulitzer Prize for his 1968 drama The Great White Hope. Virginia Leith, who played The Girl in this film, went on to play Jan in the 1962 cult classic The Brain That Wouldn't Die. Paul Mazursky, who later received recognition as the director of such films as Harry and Tonto and An Unmarried Woman, was cast as the soldier who kills the captive peasant.

Funds for Fear and Desire were raised from Kubrick's family and friends, with most of it coming from Martin Perveler, Kubrick's uncle and the owner of a profitable pharmacy. The film's original budget has been estimated at $10,000.

The production team consisted of 14 people: the director, five actors (Paul Mazursky, Frank Silvera, Kenneth Harp, Steve Coit, and Virginia Leith), five crew members (including Kubrick's first wife, Toba Metz) and three Mexican laborers who transported the film equipment around California's San Gabriel Mountains, where the film was shot. Due to budget limitations, Kubrick improvised in the use of his equipment. To create fog, Kubrick used a crop sprayer, but the cast and crew was nearly asphyxiated because the machinery still contained the insecticide used for its agricultural work. For tracking shots, Paul Mazursky recalled how Kubrick came up with a novel substitute: "There was no dolly track, just a baby carriage to move the camera", he told an interviewer.

To reduce production costs, Kubrick had intended to make it a silent picture, but in the end the adding of sounds, effects and music brought the production over budget to around $53,000, and had to be bailed out by producer Richard de Rochemont, on condition that he help in de Rochemont's production of a five-part program about Abraham Lincoln for the educational TV series Omnibus, filmed on location in Hodgenville, Kentucky. Kubrick also ran into difficulty in editing a key scene where one of the soldiers throws a plate of beans to the floor and enters the frame from the wrong side. Kubrick's blocking of the crucial scene was faulty, and his actors accidentally crossed the so-called "stage line"; this required the negative to be flipped in the printing process to preserve continuity, which was another expense.

== Release ==
The shorter re-release of Fear and Desire (1953)

The film was first shown in a 70-minute version at the Venice Film Festival on August 18, 1952 under the title Shape of Fear, in the section called Festival of the Scientific Film and Art Documentary. It was later picked up for U.S. theatrical release by Joseph Burstyn, a distributor and war veteran who specialized in the presentation of European art house titles. The film was cut down to 62 minutes and renamed Fear and Desire and was distributed with the tagline "Trapped ... 4 Desperate Men and a Strange Half-Animal Girl!" In an uncredited review following the New York premiere, The New York Times noted: "If Fear and Desire is uneven and sometimes reveals an experimental rather than a polished exterior, its overall effect is entirely worthy of the sincere effort put into it."

=== Critical response ===
Kubrick received praise for Fear and Desire from film critic and screenwriter James Agee, who reportedly took Kubrick out for a drink and told him, "There are too many good things ... to call [Fear and Desire] arty." Columbia University professor Mark Van Doren sent Kubrick a letter that stated: "The incident of the girl bound to the tree will make movie history once it is seen ... Stanley Kubrick is worth watching for those who want to discover high talent at the moment it appears."

Fear and Desire was not a box office success, and Kubrick had to take a for-hire job directing the promotional short The Seafarers on behalf of the Seafarers International Union in order to raise funds for his next planned feature, Killer's Kiss (1955), which was co-written by Kubrick and Howard Sackler and stars Frank Silvera, one of the Fear and Desire actors.

In 1994, New York Times critic Janet Maslin, in her review of a Film Forum double bill featuring Kubrick's first two feature films, Fear and Desire:

would not have passed muster with any film maker a day over 25... But its editing is superb, its compositional sense quite striking, and its cinematography uncommonly handsome for a low-budget film by a neophyte. For Kubrick aficionados, this rare and quirky artifact is a must.

On the review aggregator website Rotten Tomatoes, 70% of 27 critics' reviews are positive, with an average rating of 5.8/10.

=== Disappearance and rediscovery ===
In the years following its release, Fear and Desire seemed to have disappeared. Distributor Joseph Burstyn died in November 1953 on a trans-Atlantic flight, and his company went out of business. Kubrick tried to burn the film's original negative and sought to destroy any leftover prints after the failed film fell out of circulation following Burstyn's death. However, some prints of the film remained in private collections.

Fear and Desire had its first retrospective screening at the 1993 Telluride Film Festival. In January 1994, the Film Forum, a nonprofit art and revival theater in lower Manhattan, announced plans to show Fear and Desire on a double bill with Killer's Kiss. Although the film's copyright lapsed and the property was in the public domain, thus allowing it to be shown without fear of legal actions, Kubrick tried to discourage it from gaining an audience. Through Warner Brothers, Kubrick issued a statement that severely downplayed the film's value, and he called Fear and Desire "a bumbling amateur film exercise".

There were very few public screenings of Fear and Desire; the only commercially available print belonged to the George Eastman House in Rochester, New York. Among the rare presentations were a 1993 screening at the Library of Congress in Washington, D.C., a 2003 one-time screening at the Two Boots Den of Cin in New York City and an August 2008 presentation at the Wexner Center for the Arts in Columbus, Ohio. Additionally, some clips from the film were included in the 2001 documentary Stanley Kubrick: A Life in Pictures.

In 2010, an original copy of the film was discovered at a Puerto Rican film laboratory.

On December 14, 2011, Turner Classic Movies aired a print restored by George Eastman House.

Kino Video released a DVD and Blu-ray on October 23, 2012, and it was released the following year by British company Eureka Entertainment as part of its Masters of Cinema line.

In 2023, a 35mm print of the original 70-minute Venice premiere cut was discovered. The film was restored in 4K by the Library of Congress and Kino Lorber, using both the original camera negative and the newly found print. It was released on a 4K UHD Blu-Ray in 2024.''

The film is set to have a reissue from The Criterion Collection as a bonus feature, alongside Kubrick's three short films, in their release of Killer's Kiss as part of The Complete Kubrick, their box set of Kubrick's full filmography, releasing October 20, 2026.

== Bibliography ==
- Baxter, John (1997). Stanley Kubrick: A Biography. HarperCollins. ISBN 978-0-00-638445-8.
- Duncan, Paul (2003). Stanley Kubrick: The Complete Films. Taschen GmbH. ISBN 978-3-8365-2775-0.
