= Ruth Sobotka =

American dancer (1925–1967)

- Born: Ruth A. Sobotka; September 4, 1925; Vienna, Austria
- Died: June 17, 1967 (aged 41); New York City, U.S.
- Occupations: Dancer, costume designer, art director, painter, actress
- Spouse: Stanley Kubrick (m. 1955; div. 1957)

Ruth A. Sobotka (September 4, 1925 – June 17, 1967) was an Austrian-born American dancer, costume designer, art director, painter, and actress. She was the second wife of film director Stanley Kubrick.

== Life and career ==
The daughter and only child of Austrian architect and interior designer, Walter Sobotka (1888–1972) and Viennese actress, Gisela Schönau, Ruth Sobotka immigrated to the United States from Vienna with her parents in 1938. She studied set design at the University of Pennsylvania and graduated from the Carnegie Institute of Technology, which eventually became Carnegie Mellon University. After studying at the School of American Ballet, Sobotka became a member of George Balanchine's Ballet Society (1946–1948) and its successor the New York City Ballet from 1949 to 1961. She also designed the costumes for and danced in the Jerome Robbins' ballet The Cage (1951) and played Robbins' wife in Tyl Eulenspiegel (1951).

She appeared in many Balanchine ballets including The Four Temperaments (1946); Serenade, Apollo, Symphony in C (1946); Swan Lake (pas de quatre) (1951); Concerto Barocco, The Nutcracker (1954); Ivesiana (1954); Agon (1957); and The Figure in the Carpet (1961). Sobotka also danced in James Waring's company and for major American choreographers and designed costumes for works by Paul Taylor, Erick Hawkins, and John Taras. She danced on Broadway in the musicals Sadie Thompson (1944) and the Balanchine revival of On Your Toes (1954).

A young Sobotka appeared as "The Girl" in Man Ray's segment "Ruth, Roses and Revolvers" in the avant-garde film by Hans Richter, Dreams That Money Can Buy (1947). She appeared in a cameo role of the ballerina "Iris" in Stanley Kubrick's Killer's Kiss (1955), performing choreography by David Vaughan, and served as art director of Kubrick's subsequent feature, The Killing (1956).

== Later years ==
After her resignation from the New York City Ballet in 1961, Sobotka choreographed for the American Shakespeare Festival in Stamford, Connecticut and studied acting under Herbert Berghof, Uta Hagen and later Lee Strasberg at the Actors Studio. She appeared in a number of Off-Broadway productions, including Charlotta Ivanovna in Anton Chekov's The Cherry Orchard at Theatre Four in November, 1962, and was a member of the Seattle Repertory Theatre during their first season in 1963, playing Cordelia in King Lear.

== Personal life ==
Sobotka was the second wife of film director Stanley Kubrick (1928–1999). The couple met in 1952; they married on January 15, 1955 and divorced in 1957. An earlier marriage to Donald Boose was annulled.

On June 17, 1967, Sobotka died at the Flower and Fifth Avenue Hospital (now the New York Medical College) after a brief illness, aged 41.

== Filmography ==
Ruth Sobotka film work
Year	Title	Role	Notes
Dreams That Money Can Buy	1946	The girl	Uncredited
Killer's Kiss	1954	Iris	
