= Flying Padre =

1951 short film directed by Stanley Kubrick

- Title card from Flying Padre
- Directed by: Stanley Kubrick
- Written by: Stanley Kubrick
- Produced by: Burton Benjamin
- Starring: Fred Stadtmueller
- Narrated by: Bob Hite
- Cinematography: Stanley Kubrick
- Edited by: Isaac Kleinerman
- Music by: Nathaniel Shilkret
- Distributed by: RKO Radio Pictures
- Release date: March 23, 1951
- Running time: 9 minutes
- Country: United States
- Language: English

Flying Padre is a 1951 short subject black-and-white documentary film. It is the second film directed by Stanley Kubrick. The film is nine minutes long and was completed shortly after Kubrick had completed his first film for RKO, the short subject Day of the Fight (1951). The studio offered him a follow-up project for their Screenliner series.

== Synopsis ==
The subject of Flying Padre is a Catholic priest in rural New Mexico, Reverend Fred Stadtmueller. Known to his parishioners as the "Flying Padre", his 4,000-square mile parish is so large, he uses a Piper Cub aircraft, named the Spirit of St. Joseph, to travel from one isolated settlement to another.

The film shows two days in his daily life, with the Reverend providing spiritual guidance, saying a Funeral Mass, and other glimpses of his life such as his breakfast routine at the parish house. His days include a funeral service for a ranch hand, and counseling of two young parishioners who have been quarreling. In the climax of the film. the "Flying Padre" also operated as an impromptu air ambulance by flying a sick child and his mother to hospital.

== Cast ==
- Bob Hite as himself — Narrator (voice)
- Reverend Fred Stadtmueller as himself
- Pedro as himself

== Production ==
After Kubrick sold his first short film, the self-financed Day of the Fight, to RKO in 1951 for $4,000, pocketing a $100 profit. The company advanced the 23-year-old filmmaker money to make a follow-up project, a documentary short for their Pathe Screenliner series, which specialized in short human-interest documentaries. He originally wanted to call the film Sky Pilot, but the studio did not like the title.

Flying Padre is narrated by CBS announcer Bob Hite. (Note: Hite was an announcer and anchor for CBS from 1944-1979, during which time he was announcer for the CBS Evening News with Walter Cronkite. Prior to joining CBS, Hite was at WXYZ, Detroit, where he narrated the old radio shows such as The Lone Ranger, The Green Hornet, Sergeant Preston of the Yukon, and The Shadow.)

== Reception ==
In an interview in 1969, Kubrick referred to Flying Padre as a "silly thing". Flying Padre, however, was an important landmark in his budding career as a filmmaker. "It was at this point that I formally quit my job at Look to work full time on filmmaking," Kubrick stated in an interview."
