= The Seafarers =

1953 film by Stanley Kubrick

- title card
- Directed by: Stanley Kubrick
- Written by: Will Chasan
- Produced by: Stanley Kubrick; Lester Cooper
- Narrated by: Don Hollenbeck
- Distributed by: Seafarers International Union
- Release date: October 15, 1953
- Running time: 30 minutes
- Country: United States
- Language: English

The Seafarers is a 1953 American documentary short film directed by Stanley Kubrick, made for the Seafarers International Union, directed in June 1953. The film was Kubrick's first in color.

== Content ==
There are shots of ships, machinery, a canteen, and a union meeting. The film was supervised by the staff of The Seafarers Log, the union magazine. For the cafeteria scene in the film, Kubrick chose a long, sideways-shooting dolly shot to establish the life of the seafarer's community; this shot is an early demonstration of a signature technique that Kubrick would use in his feature films. Another such shot involves a group of seafarers walking across screen from a shaded area to a sunlit space as they approach the SIU Union hall.

== Rediscovery ==
The film was re-discovered in 1973 by film scholar and filmmaker Frank P. Tomasulo, who arranged for a 16mm print of the documentary to be deposited in the permanent collection of the Library of Congress' Motion Picture Division.

== Home video ==
The Seafarers was released on DVD in 2008 with audio commentary from directors Roger Avary and Keith Gordon, as well as an interview with one of Kubrick's daughters. The short is also available as an extra on the 2012 release of Kubrick's first full-length film Fear and Desire.
