= Day of the Fight =

1951 film by Stanley Kubrick

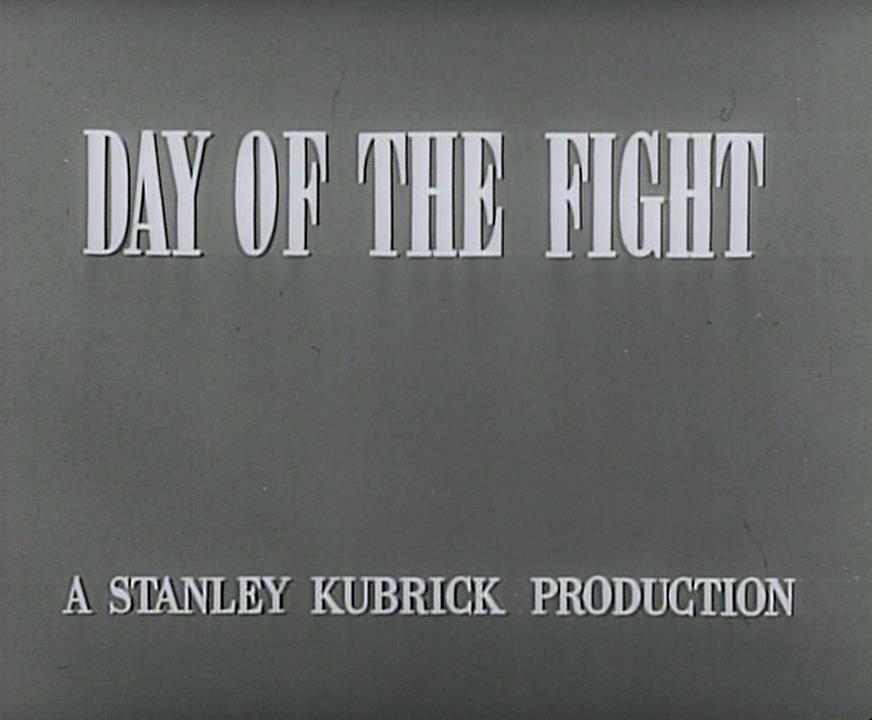
- title card
- Directed by: Stanley Kubrick
- Written by: Robert Rein (narration)
- Produced by: Stanley Kubrick; Jay Bonafield (uncredited)
- Starring: Walter Cartier; Vincent Cartier
- Narrated by: Douglas Edwards
- Cinematography: Stanley Kubrick
- Edited by: Julian Bergman; Stanley Kubrick (uncredited)
- Music by: Gerald Fried
- Distributed by: RKO Radio Pictures
- Release date: April 26, 1951
- Running time: 12 minutes
- Country: United States
- Language: English
- Budget: $3,900

Day of the Fight is a 1951 American short-subject documentary film financed and directed by Stanley Kubrick, who based this black-and-white motion picture on a photo feature he shot two years earlier for Look magazine.

== Synopsis ==
Day of the Fight shows Irish-American middleweight boxer Walter Cartier during the height of his career, on April 17, 1950, the day of a fight with middleweight Bobby James.

The film opens with a short section on boxing's history and then follows Cartier through his day as he prepares for the 10 P.M. bout. Cartier eats breakfast in his West 12th Street apartment in Greenwich Village, goes to early mass, and eats lunch at his favorite restaurant. At 4 P.M., he starts preparations for the fight. By 8 P.M., he is waiting in his dressing room at Laurel Gardens in Newark, New Jersey, for the fight to begin.

We then see the fight itself, which Cartier wins in a short match.

== Cast ==
- Douglas Edwards as Narrator (voice only)
- Walter Cartier as Himself (uncredited)
- Vincent Cartier as Himself - Walter's twin brother (uncredited)
- Nat Fleischer as Himself - boxing historian (uncredited)
- Bobby James as Himself - Walter's opponent (uncredited)
- Stanley Kubrick as Himself - man at ringside with camera (uncredited)
- Alexander Singer as Himself - man at ringside with camera (uncredited)
- Judy Singer as Herself - female fan in crowd (uncredited)

=== Cast notes ===
- The year after the fight chronicled in Day of the Fight took place, Walter Cartier made boxing history by knocking out Joe Rindone in the first 47 seconds of a match (16 October 1951). Cartier had played some bit parts in movies before he appeared in Day of the Fight, and afterwards, up until 1971, he continued to appear occasionally in films and on television. With regard to his televised performances, his best known role is in the 1955-1956 season of the American sitcom The Phil Silvers Show in which he portrays the mild-mannered character Private Claude Dillingham.
- Alexander Singer, who was a high-school friend of Stanley Kubrick (both attended William Howard Taft High School in the Bronx), served as assistant director and as a cameraman on this production. Singer also worked on Kubrick's Killer's Kiss (1955) and The Killing (1956), and had a long career as a director of films and television dramas.
- Douglas Edwards, the narrator on Day of the Fight, was a veteran CBS radio and television newscaster. At the time, he was the anchor on the first televised daily news program, which would later be titled Douglas Edwards with the News and then The CBS Evening News.

A shot from Day of the Fight (1951)

== Production ==
Kubrick and Singer used daylight-loading Eyemo cameras that take 100-foot spools of 35mm black-and-white film to shoot the fight, with Kubrick shooting hand-held (often from below) and Singer's camera on a tripod. The 100-foot reels required constant reloading, and Kubrick did not catch the knock-out punch which ended the bout because he was reloading. Singer did, however.

Day of the Fight is the first film credit on composer Gerald Fried's resume. Kubrick did not pay him for his work in scoring the production. "He thought the very fact that my doing the music" for the film "got me into the profession was enough payment", Fried told The Guardian in 2018, although he conceded in the same newspaper interview that Kubrick's point was accurate. A childhood friend of Kubrick, Fried later composed the score for the director's Paths of Glory (1957) and three other films.

Since the original planned buyer of the documentary went out of business, Kubrick was able to sell Day of the Fight to RKO Pictures for $4,000, resulting in only a net profit of $100 for him after paying the film's $3,900 in production costs. However, the physicist and author Jeremy Bernstein, who in November 1965 conducted a 76-minute interview with Kubrick for The New Yorker, documented that the project was actually not a break-even endeavor, that it instead lost $100.

Day of the Fight was released as part of RKO-Pathé's "This Is America" series and premiered on 25 April 1951 at New York's Paramount Theater, on the same program as the film My Forbidden Past. Frank Sinatra headlined the live stage show that day

== See also ==
- List of boxing films
