= Michel Ciment =

French film critic (1938–2023)

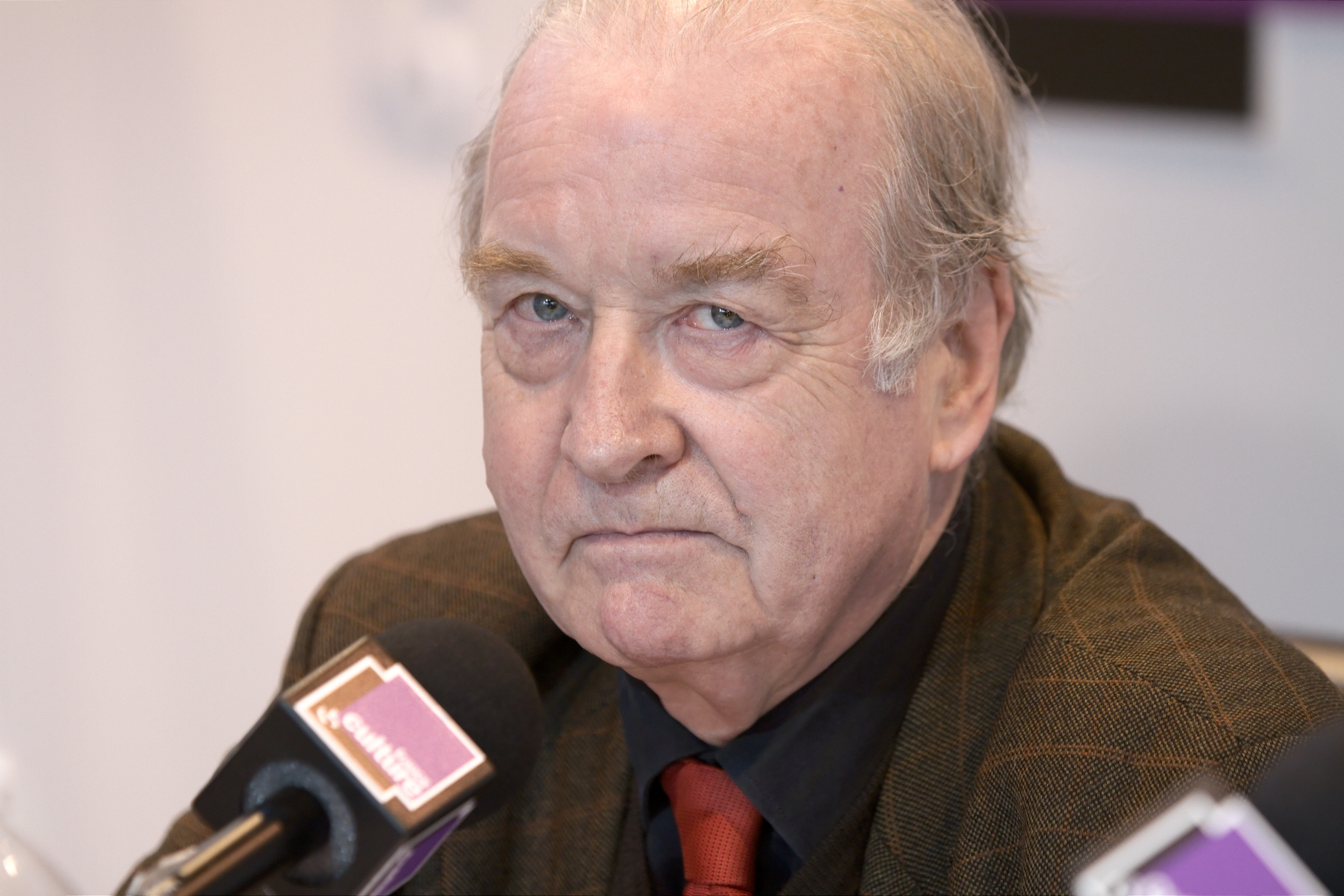
- Ciment in 2010
- Born: 26 May 1938; Paris, France
- Died: 13 November 2023 (aged 85); Paris, France
- Education: Lycée Louis-Le-Grand; Lycée Condorcet; Sorbonne; Amherst College
- Occupations: Film critic; Editor; Academic; Radio presenter
- Children: Gilles Ciment

Michel Jean Ciment (French: [simɑ̃]; 26 May 1938 – 13 November 2023) was a French film critic, author, and editor of the cinema magazine Positif. He was also a maître de conférences in American civilization at the University of Paris-VII.

== Biography ==
Ciment was born in the 9th arrondissement of Paris on 26 May 1938, the son of Alexander and Hélène Cziment. (Note: Ciment's father changed his last name after World War II, when he became a naturalised French citizen.) His father, a Hungarian Jew, had settled in the French capital in the 1920s and narrowly escaped the Vel' d'Hiv Roundup in 1942, fleeing to Normandy where he was later joined by his son. Ciment's French mother was also Jewish, but kept this fact hidden until just before her death (he was baptised and raised as a Catholic). He attended the Lycée Condorcet, then enrolled in a Classe préparatoire aux grandes écoles at the Lycée Louis-le-Grand, where he was influenced by the teaching of philosopher Gilles Deleuze. He studied English at the Sorbonne, and in 1958–59, was a Fulbright scholar at Amherst College in the United States, where he gained a knowledge of American history.

Ciment was noted for his love for American film, somewhat unusual in his French cultural environment. He credited his Americophilia to his memories of the liberation of Paris by American soldiers in 1944, when he was a child.

Although Ciment had written about cinema in a student publication, his first mainstream film review (of The Trial) was published in Positif magazine in 1963. He was made a board member at the influencal periodical in 1966 and went on to become its de facto chief editor, later assuming the role of publishing director in 2004. In 1972, Ciment became a film critic on the France Inter radio programme Le Masque et la Plume, to which he contributed until a few weeks before his death. From 1990 to 2016, he also hosted Projection privée on the radio station France Culture. He was the author of reference works on the film directors John Boorman, Jane Campion, Elia Kazan, Stanley Kubrick, Joseph Losey, and Francesco Rosi, based on extensive interviews with his subjects. An anthology of interviews, Film World, was published in English 2009.

Ciment was a Chevalier of the Order of Merit, Knight of the Legion of Honour, Officer in the Order of Arts and Letters, and past president of International Federation of Film Critics. He was the first recipient of the Prix Maurice Bessy, presented at the 1994 Cannes Film Festival. He died in Paris on 13 November 2023, aged 85, being survived by his second wife, Evelyne Hazan-Ciment, and son, Gilles. His first wife, Jeannine, who worked with him at Positif, died in 1986. Paying tribute to his friend, John Boorman described Ciment as "an original", commenting: "To say that Michel was passionate about the cinema was to do him an injustice. He lived and ate and dreamed cinema."

== Film criticism ==
Ciment regarded cinema as a synthesis of all the arts, stating that he could not imagine being a film critic without a knowledge of theatre, literature, painting, and music. He preferred to know as little as possible about a film when viewing it for the first time, and avoided reading press releases in advance.

== Favorite films ==
In 2012, Ciment participated in Sight & Sound magazine's critics' poll of the greatest films of all time, when he listed his ten favorite movies as: 2001: A Space Odyssey, The Earrings of Madame de..., Fellini's Casanova, Persona, Providence, The Rules of the Game, Salvatore Giuliano, Sansho the Bailiff, Sunrise: A Song of Two Humans, and Trouble in Paradise.

== Publications ==
- Ciment, Michel (1973). Kazan on Kazan. Cinema One. London: Viking / British Film Institute. ISBN 0436099381.
- Ciment, Michel (1976). Le dossier Rosi: cinéma et politique (in French). Paris: Stock. ISBN 2234005167.
- Ciment, Michel (1980). Kubrick. Translated by Adair, Gilbert. New York: Holt, Rinehart, and Winston. ISBN 0030616875.
- Ciment, Michel & Schatzberg, Jerry (1982). Schatzberg de la photo au cinéma (in French). Paris: Hachette. ISBN 2851083120.
- Ciment, Michel (1985). Boorman: un visionnaire en son temps (in French). Paris: Calmann-Lévy. ISBN 2702113486.
- Ciment, Michel (1985). Conversations with Losey. London: Methuen. ISBN 0416404707.
- Ciment, Michel & Tierchant, Hélène (1989). Theo Angelopoulos. Filmo (in French). Vol. 21. Paris: Edilig. ISBN 2856012086.
- Ciment, Michel (1992). Le Crime à l'écran: Une histoire de l'Amérique. Découvertes Gallimard Cinéma (in French). Vol. 139. Paris: Gallimard. ISBN 978-2070531950.
- Passeport pour Hollywood : entretiens avec Wilder, Huston, Mankiewicz, Polanski, Forman & Wenders, (1992)
- Ciment, Michel & Herpe, Noël, eds. (1999). Projections 9: French Film-makers on Film-making. Translated by Hodgeson, Pierre. London: Faber and Faber. ISBN 0571193560.
- Ciment, Michel (2001). Kubrick: The Definitive Edition. Translated by Adair, Gilbert & Bononno, Robert. New York: Faber & Faber. ISBN 0571199860.
- Ciment, Michel & Kardish, Laurence, eds. (2002). Positif 50 Years: Selections from the French Film Journal. New York: The Museum of Modern Art. ISBN 978-0870706882.
- Ciment, Michel (2003). Fritz Lang: Le meurtre et la loi. Découvertes Gallimard (in French). Vol. 442. Paris: Gallimard. ISBN 2070532631.
- Ciment, Michel (2003). Petite planète cinématographique (in French). Paris: Stock. ISBN 978-2234055278.
- Ciment, Michel (2009). Film World: Interviews with Cinema's Leading Directors. Oxford: Berg Publishers. ISBN 978-1845204570.
- Ciment, Michel (2015). Les conquérants d'un nouveau monde: Essais sur le cinéma hollywoodien [Conquerors of a New World: Essays on Hollywood Cinema] (in French) (Revised ed.). Paris: Gallimard. ISBN 978-2070461622.
- Ciment, Michel (2019). Une vie de cinéma (in French). Paris: Gallimard. ISBN 978-2072799679.
- Ciment, Michel (2023). Jane Campion on Jane Campion. New York: Abrams. ISBN 979-8887070032.

== Film festival juror ==
- 1976 Berlin International Film Festival
- 1978 Cannes Film Festival
- 1990 Locarno International Film Festival
- 1991 Venice International Film Festival
- 1995 Montreal World Film Festival

== Honours and distinctions ==
- Chevalier de la Légion d'honneur
- Chevalier de l'Ordre national du Mérite
- Officier de l'Ordre des Arts et des Lettres
- Président de la FIPRESCI
