= Frank Silvera =

American actor (1914–1970)

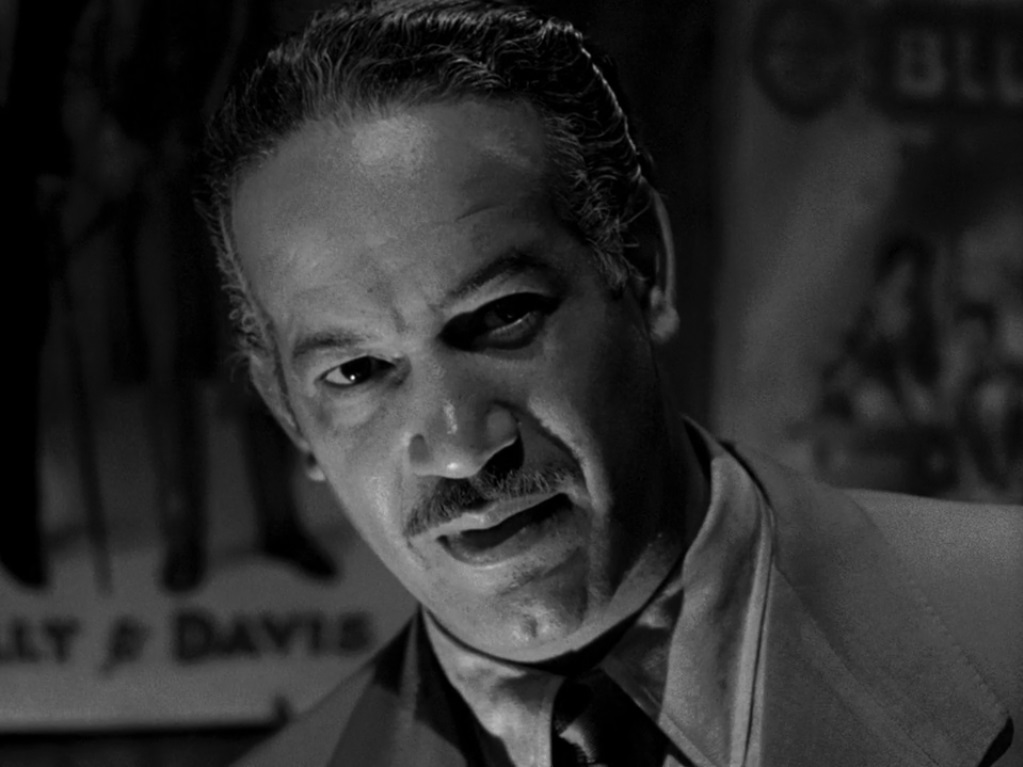
- Silvera in Killer's Kiss (1955)
- Born: Frank Alvin Silvera; July 24, 1914; Kingston, British Jamaica
- Died: June 11, 1970 (aged 55); Pasadena, California, U.S.
- Resting place: Long Island National Cemetery
- Education: Boston University; Northeastern University School of Law
- Occupations: Actor, theatrical director
- Years active: 1934–1970
- Spouse: Anna Lillian Quarles (m. 1942; div. 1963)
- Children: 2

Frank Alvin Silvera (July 24, 1914 – June 11, 1970) was a Jamaican-born American character actor and theatrical director. Born in Kingston, Jamaica and raised in Boston, Silvera dropped out of law school in 1934 after winning his first stage role. During the 1930s and 1940s, he was active in numerous stage productions on and off Broadway and appeared in radio shows. Silvera made his film debut in 1952.

Over the course of his 36-year career, he was cast in a wide variety of ethnic roles in film and television, and also remained active in theatre. He starred in the first two films of Stanley Kubrick's directorial career, Fear and Desire (1952) and Killer's Kiss (1955). Silvera was nominated for a Best Actor Tony Award in 1963 for his role in The Lady of the Camellias. He founded the Theatre of Being, a Los Angeles theatre for black actors, in 1965. At the time of his death, he had a recurring role in the NBC Western series The High Chaparral.

== Early life ==
Silvera was born in Kingston, Jamaica, the son of a mixed-race Jamaican mother, Gertrude Bell and Portuguese Jewish father, Alfred Silvera. His family emigrated to the United States when he was six years old, settling in Boston. Silvera became interested in acting and began performing in amateur theatrical groups and at church.

He graduated from English High School of Boston and then studied at Boston University, followed by the Northeastern Law School.

== Career ==
Silvera left Northeastern University Law School in 1934, when he was cast in Paul Green's production of Roll Sweet Chariot. He next joined the New England Repertory Theatre where he appeared in productions of MacBeth, Othello and The Emperor Jones. He also worked at Federal Theatre and with the New Hampshire Repertory Theatre. In 1940, Silvera made his Broadway debut in a small role in Big White Fog. His career was interrupted in 1942, when he enlisted in the United States Navy during World War II. He was assigned to Camp Robert Smalls, where he and Owen Dodson were in charge of entertainment. Silvera directed and acted in radio programs and appeared in USO shows. Honorably discharged at the war's end in 1945, he joined the cast of Anna Lucasta and became a member of the Actors Studio.

In 1952, Silvera made his film debut in the western, The Cimarron Kid. Because of his strongly Latin appearance, he was cast in a variety of ethnic roles in films and television. He was cast as General Huerta in Viva Zapata! which starred Marlon Brando. Silvera also portrayed the role in the stage production, which opened at the Regent Theatre in New York City on February 28, 1952. He appeared in two films directed by Stanley Kubrick, Fear and Desire (1953) and Killer's Kiss (1955).

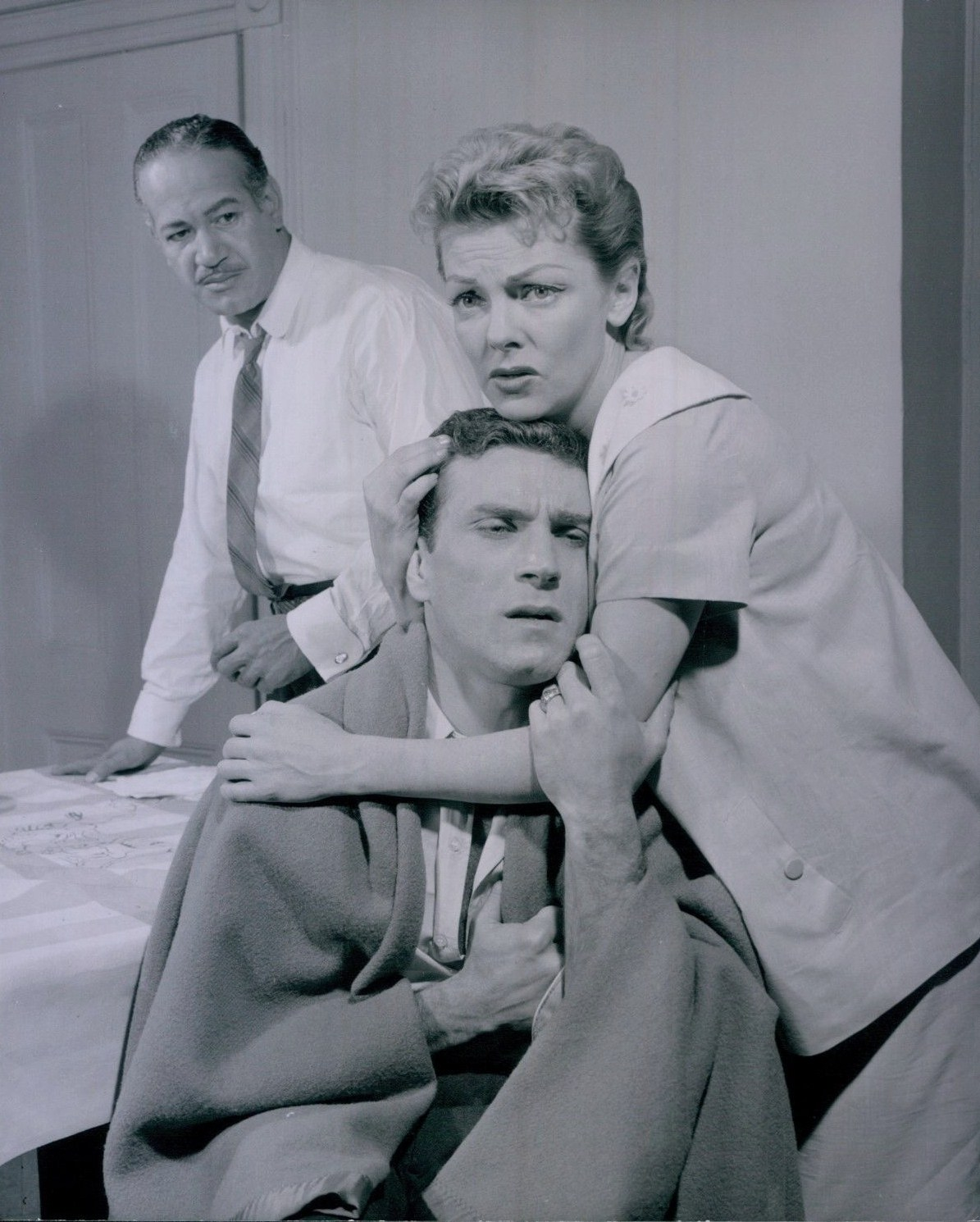
Frank Silvera, Mark Richman and Vivian Blaine in A Hatful of Rain (1955)

In August 1955, he appeared on Broadway in a revival of Thornton Wilder's The Skin of Our Teeth, which earned him favorable reviews. In November 1955, he portrayed John Pope Sr., the Italian father of Ben Gazzara and Anthony Franciosa's characters on Broadway in Michael V. Gazzo's A Hatful of Rain (a role portrayed by Lloyd Nolan on-screen), and again was praised by critics.

Silvera made guest appearances in numerous television series, mainly dramas and westerns, including Studio One in Hollywood, Alfred Hitchcock Presents, Bat Masterson, Thriller, Riverboat, The Travels of Jaimie McPheeters, The Untouchables, Gunsmoke, Perry Mason and Bonanza. In 1962 he portrayed Dr. Koslenko in The Twilight Zone episode "Person or Persons Unknown", opposite Richard Long. That year, he also played Minarii, a Polynesian man in the 1962 film Mutiny on the Bounty, again starring Marlon Brando. He also appeared as King Lear in Central Park in the New York Shakespeare Festival's production of Shakespeare's play. In 1963, he starred with Dean Martin in the movie Toys in the Attic. Silvera was nominated for a Tony Award for Best Actor in a Play for playing Monsieur Duval in The Lady of the Camellias.

In 1964, Silvera and Vantile Whitfield founded the Theatre of Being, a Los Angeles-based theatre dedicated to providing black actors with non-stereotypical roles. One of their first projects was producing The Amen Corner by African-American writer James Baldwin. Silvera and Whitfield financed the play themselves and with donations from friends. It opened on March 4, 1964, and would gross $200,000 within the year, moving to Broadway in April 1965. Beah Richards won critical acclaim for her performance as the lead.

Silvera continued his career in films and guest star roles on television. In 1965, he appeared as Gaspar, one of the Biblical Magi in the epic film The Greatest Story Ever Told, In 1966, he teamed with Marlon Brando for the third time in the Western The Appaloosa. The next year, he portrayed Nick Sorella in The St. Valentine's Day Massacre, followed by guest roles on Dundee and the Culhane and The Wild Wild West. He appeared as a Mexican bandit in Martin Ritt’s 1967 Western classic, Hombre, based on the Elmore Leonard novel. In 1969, Silvera had a supporting role as Goatherd in Che!, and as Lobero in the Zapata Western Guns of the Magnificent Seven.

Silvera was then hired as the first guest director at Fresno State College, with plans to stage a production of The Tea Concession by Henry Kemp-Blair, which reversed the racial positions of black and white in a drama about South Africa. However, he was forced to resign less than two weeks later, caught in the middle of administrative shakeups and the aborted hiring of Marvin X by the Black Studies department. "With this upheaval it seemed to blacks and browns that Silvera was part of the package, part of the hardline takeover (at Fresno State College). There was such a sense of despair and betrayal...they took it out on me," Silvera said to David Hale, theater writer for The Fresno Bee. "It seemed to me they thought I was the agent to smooth things over while the establishment hatched up something else dirty."

At the time of his death, Silvera had a recurring role in the NBC western series The High Chaparral as the Mexican rancher, Don Sebastian Montoya. His final film, Valdez Is Coming, was released posthumously, in 1971.

== Personal life ==
Silvera married actress Anna Lillian Quarles in 1942. They met while appearing in a stage production of Stevedore. Quarles was the sister of historian and educator Benjamin Arthur Quarles. They had two children, Frank Jr. and Linda, before divorcing in 1963.

== Death ==
Silvera was killed on June 11, 1970, after accidentally electrocuting himself while repairing a garbage disposal unit in his kitchen sink. He was 55.

== Legacy ==
In 1973, the Frank Silvera Writers' Workshop Foundation, Inc. was created in honor of Silvera and his efforts to support black-American actors and playwrights. The organization sponsors promising African-American playwrights. In 2005, the workshop was among 406 New York City arts and social service institutions to receive part of a $20 million grant from the Carnegie Corporation, which was made possible through a donation by New York City mayor, Michael Bloomberg.

== Filmography ==
Film
Year	Title	Role	Notes
1952	The Cimarron Kid	Stacey Marshall	
1952	The Fighter	Paulino	
1952	Viva Zapata!	Victoriano Huerta	
1952	The Miracle of Our Lady of Fatima	Arturo dos Santos	
1953	White Mane	Narrator	
1953	Fear and Desire	Sergeant Mac	
1954	The Lonely Night	The Narrator	
1955	Death Tide	Eric Paulsen	
1955	Killer's Kiss	Vincent Rapallo	
1956	Crowded Paradise	Papa Diaz	
1959	Crime and Punishment U.S.A.	Lieutenant Porter	
1960	Heller in Pink Tights	Santis	
1960	The Mountain Road	Colonel Kwan	
1960	Key Witness	Detective Rafael Torno	
1962	Mutiny on the Bounty	Minarii	
1963	Toys in the Attic	Henry Simpson	
1963	Lonnie	Paco	
1965	The Greatest Story Ever Told	Caspar	
1966	The Appaloosa	Ramos	
1967	Hombre	Mexican Bandit	
1967	The St. Valentine's Day Massacre	Nick Sorello	
1968	The Stalking Moon	Major	
1968	Up Tight!	Kyle	
1969	Guns of the Magnificent Seven	Lobero	
1969	Che!	Goatherd	
1971	Valdez Is Coming	Diego	Released posthumously

Television
Year	Title	Role	Notes
1951–57	Studio One in Hollywood	Various roles	2 episodes
1954	The Marriage	Mr. Ramon	Episode #1.1
1955	Producers' Showcase	Judge	Episode: "The Skin of Our Teeth"
1957	The Seven Lively Arts	John	Episode: "The World of Nick Adams"
1958	Wanted: Dead or Alive	Sheriff Will Echert	Episode: "Sheriff at Red Rock"
1958	Playhouse 90	Nick Serrello	Episode: "Seven Against the Wall"
1958	Perry Mason	Jonathan Hyett	Episode: "The Case of the Fancy Figures" s2e10.
1959	Alfred Hitchcock Presents	Mr. Roderiguez	Season 4 Episode 15: "A Personal Matter"
1959	Dick Powell's Zane Grey Theater	Ysidro	Episode: "Trouble at Tres Cruces"
1959	Decoy	Andrew Garcia	Episode: "Across the World"
1959	Bat Masterson	Grasia	Episode: "The Romany Knives"
1959	The Lineup	Papa Vanetti	Episode: "My Son is a Stranger"
1959	The Man From Blackhawk	Kiczek	Episode: "The Gypsy Story"
1960	Johnny Ringo	Bevinetto	Episode: "Shoot the Moon"
1960	The Law and Mr. Jones	Garcia	Episode: "Music to Hurt By"
1960	Thriller	Cesare Romano / Charlie Roman	Episode: "The Guilty Men"
1960	Hong Kong	Kivori	Episode: "Freebooter"
1960	The Rebel	Cota	Episode: "Deathwatch"
1960	Riverboat	Colonel Ashley	Episode: "Devil in Skirts"
1960	The Untouchables	Dino Patrone	Episode: "A Seat on the Fence"
1961–64	Bonanza	El Jefe / Mateo Ybarra	2 episodes
1962	The Twilight Zone	Dr. Koslenko	Episode: "Person or Persons Unknown"
1962	The New Breed	John Hernandez	Episode: "My Brother's Keeper"
1962	The Beachcomber	Various roles	2 episodes
1962	The Dick Powell Show		Episode: "Borderline"
1963	The Defenders	Ballin	Episode: "The Last Illusion"
1963	The Travels of Jaimie McPheeters	The Indian, Speaks to the Wind	Episode: "The Day of the Taboo Man"
1964	The Great Adventure	Gambi	Episode: "The Pirate and the Patriot"
1964	Channing		Episode: "Memory of a Firing Squad"
1964	The Alfred Hitchcock Hour	Alejandro	Season 3 Episode 4: "The Life Work of Juan Diaz"
1964	Mr. Novak	Andy Towner	Episode: "Boy Under Glass"
1964–65	Kraft Suspense Theatre	Various roles	2 episodes
1965	Profiles in Courage		Episode: "Hamilton Fish"
1965	Daniel Boone	Marcel Bouvier	Episode: "Daughter of the Devil"
1965	Rawhide	Pajarito	Episode: "El Hombre Bravo"
1965	Gunsmoke	John Drago	Episode: "Death Watch"
1966	I Spy	Munoz	Episode: "Crusade to Limbo"
1966	The Rat Patrol	Arab Leader	Episode: "The Chain of Death Raid"
1966	Run for Your Life	Esteban	Episode: "The Shock of Recognition"
1967	Dundee and the Culhane	Luis Montoya	Episode: "The Vasquez Brief"
1967	The Wild Wild West	El Sordo	Episode: "The Night of Jack O'Diamonds"
1967–70	The High Chaparral	Don Sebastian Montoya	14 episodes
1968	The Young Loner	Carlos	Television film
1968–71	The Wonderful World of Disney	Carlos	4 episodes
1969	Marcus Welby, M.D.	Nick Eugenides	Episode: "The Vrahnas Demon"
1970	The Flying Nun	Thomas Sebastien Martinez	Episode: "No Tears for Mrs. Thomas"
1970	Hawaii Five-O	Frank Kuakua	Episode: "Paniolo"; Aired posthumously
1971	Bayou Boy	Uncle Maxim	Television film Aired posthumously
1975	Perilous Voyage	General Salazar	Television film Aired posthumously, filmed in 1968 (final film role)
