= Killer's Kiss =

1955 film by Stanley Kubrick

- Theatrical release poster
- Directed by: Stanley Kubrick
- Screenplay by: Howard Sackler (uncredited)
- Story by: Stanley Kubrick
- Produced by: Stanley Kubrick; Morris Bousel
- Starring: Frank Silvera; Jamie Smith; Irene Kane; Ruth Sobotka
- Cinematography: Stanley Kubrick
- Edited by: Stanley Kubrick
- Music by: Gerald Fried
- Production company: Minotaur Productions
- Distributed by: United Artists
- Release dates: September 21, 1955 (New York City); October 1, 1955 (United States)
- Running time: 67 minutes
- Country: United States
- Language: English
- Budget: $75,000

Killer's Kiss is a 1955 American independent film noir directed, photographed, edited, and produced by Stanley Kubrick and written by Kubrick and Howard Sackler. It is the second feature film directed by Kubrick, following his 1953 debut feature, Fear and Desire. The film is about Davey Gordon (Jamie Smith), a 29-year-old middleweight New York boxer at the end of his career, and his relationship with his neighbor, taxi dancer Gloria Price (Irene Kane), and her violent employer Vincent Rapallo (Frank Silvera).

The film premiered in New York City in September 1955 and was theatrically released on October 1, 1955. Like many of Kubrick's works, the film received mixed reviews upon release but was reappraised over time; Kubrick himself was critical of the film but acknowledged that it gave him exposure.

== Plot ==
In New York City, veteran welterweight boxer Davey Gordon lives in the same building as taxi dancer Gloria Price. Their windows face each other, and they steal glances at one another. The two leave their building at the same time to report to their jobs: Davey prepares to fight newcomer Kid Rodriguez, and Gloria is picked up by Vinnie Rapallo, her boss at a dance hall. Davey's fight with Kid Rodriguez is televised, and Rapallo brings Gloria to his office, both to watch the fight and to make sexual advances. After Davey is knocked out, he goes home and takes a phone call from his uncle, who wants Davey to return to the family farm near Seattle. Davey falls asleep but is awakened from a nightmare by Gloria's screaming. He sees that Rapallo is assaulting her, shouts at Rapallo to scare him off, and runs across the roof of the building to reach Gloria's apartment, finding her unharmed.

The next morning, Davey and Gloria share breakfast. Gloria describes her family history: her older sister Iris was an accomplished ballerina, and their mother died while giving birth to Gloria. Gloria's father favored Iris and Gloria resented her. Shortly after their father's death, Iris committed suicide. Davey and Gloria fall for each other and arrange to go to Seattle together after collecting their final payments.

At the dance hall, Rapallo initially refuses to give Gloria her last payment as he sees her lover standing outside. Before she leaves, she insults Rapallo, calling him old and smelly. Meanwhile, thieves steal Davey's scarf and Davey chases after them just before his manager Albert arrives with his final payment. Rapallo speaks to his henchmen, who find Gloria standing next to Albert outside the building. They entice Gloria back inside with the promise of money and then, mistaking Albert for Davey, they chase and kill him. Davey and Gloria reunite and leave with Gloria's payment. At the apartment building, Davey vacates his unit and crosses the roof to Gloria's, finding it empty as well. Looking across to his old window, Davey observes police searching for him because they suspect him in the murder of his manager.

Davey stalks Rapallo and, at gunpoint, forces him to drive to a hideout where Gloria is being held prisoner. As Davey attempts to free Gloria, the gangsters overpower him. Gloria begs for her life, kisses Rapallo, and promises to go away with him, but he scorns her even though she claims not to care about Davey. Davey jumps through a window and escapes. Pursued by the gangsters, he uses a fire escape to climb onto a rooftop. Rapallo chases him into a mannequin warehouse, and they fight, Rapallo wielding an axe and Davey a pike pole. Davey kills Rapallo.

At Penn Station, Davey awaits his train to Seattle and recalls the events of the past few days. Police questioned him and Gloria separately, and once they concluded that he acted in self-defense and was not responsible for Albert's murder, he was freed. Gloria finds Davey at the station and the two embrace.

== Cast ==
- Frank Silvera as Vincent Rapallo
- Jamie Smith as Davey Gordon
- Irene Kane as Gloria Price
- Jerry Jarrett as Albert
- Mike Dana as Gangster
- Felice Orlandi as Gangster
- Shaun O'Brien as Landlord
- Barbara Brand as Taxi Dance Lady
- David Vaughan as Conventioneer
- Alec Rubin as Conventioneer
- Ralph Roberts as Gangster
- Phil Stevenson as Gangster
- Arthur Feldman as Policeman
- Bill Funaro as Taxi Driver
- Skippy Adelman as Owner of mannequin factory
- Ruth Sobotka as Iris

== Production ==
This was Kubrick's second feature. Kubrick removed his first film, Fear and Desire (1952), from circulation over his dissatisfaction with it. Kubrick directed that film between the ages of 23 and 24, and had to borrow $40,000 (equivalent to $485,000 in 2025) from his uncle Martin Perveler, who owned a chain of drug stores in Los Angeles. Killer's Kiss, originally titled Kiss Me, Kill Me, was also financed privately through family and friends, but because Fear and Desire did not recoup its production budget, Perveler did not invest this time. Most of the initial budget was covered by Morris Bousel, a Bronx pharmacist who was rewarded with a co-producer credit.

Kubrick began to shoot the film with sound recorded on location, as was common practice in Hollywood. However, frustrated by the intrusion of the microphone into his lighting scheme, Kubrick fired his sound man and decided to post-dub the entire film as he had with his first film. Actress Irene Kane did not like the looping process, and Kubrick employed radio actress Peggy Lobbin to record her lines in post. The film is notable for its location shots in the old Penn Station, which was demolished in 1963, as well as Times Square, and the run-down streets of both the Brooklyn waterfront and of Hell's Hundred Acres – the nickname at the time for Manhattan's SoHo neighborhood. Because he did not have a filming permit, Kubrick shot several outdoor street scenes with a handheld camera from the bed of a moving pickup truck.

Ballerina Ruth Sobotka, Kubrick's wife at the time, was the art director for this film, as well as for Kubrick's next, The Killing. She is also featured in a long dance solo, playing the role of Iris. Then-model and future writer and television journalist Chris Chase, using the stage name Irene Kane, made her acting debut as the female lead.

Against Kubrick's wishes, United Artists required the film be recut with a happy ending. Kane was reportedly unhappy with the decision as "several endings to the picture had been shot, and she no longer knew how the film was going to end." United Artists paid $100,000 for the film and also agreed to provide $100,000 for Kubrick's next, The Killing.

The film features the song "Once", written by Norman Gimbel and Arden Clar. It is one of Gimbel's earliest contributions to a film, although his lyrics do not appear in the final version.

== Reception ==
=== Critical response ===
Killer's Kiss film trailer

On the review aggregator website Rotten Tomatoes, 81% of 37 critics' reviews are positive, with an average rating of 6.4/10.

When released, the staff at Variety magazine gave the film a mixed review, and wrote:

Ex-Look photographer Stanley Kubrick turned out Killer's Kiss on the proverbial shoestring. Kiss was more than a warm-up for Kubrick's talents, for not only did he co-produce but he directed, photographed and edited the venture from his own screenplay [originally written by Howard Sackler] and original story...Kubrick's low-key lensing occasionally catches the flavor of the seamy side of Gotham life. His scenes of tawdry Broadway, gloomy tenements and grotesque brick-and-stone structures that make up Manhattan's downtown eastside loft district help offset the script's deficiencies.

The September 1955 review of the film in the Motion Picture Herald said: "The most unusual aspect of this somewhat trite melodrama is the fact that it was virtually put together by one man... In each of these directions Kubrick shows some promise of talents that deserve encouragement."

In 1994, New York Times critic Janet Maslin, in her review of a Film Forum double bill featuring Kubrick's first two feature films, concludes her piece with this brief reassessment of Killer's Kiss:

Killer's Kiss brought the director onto more conventional territory, with a film noir plot about a boxer, a gangster and a dance hall girl. Using Times Square and even the subway as his backdrop, Mr. Kubrick worked in an uncharacteristically naturalistic style despite the genre material, with mixed but still fascinating results. The actress playing the dance hall girl, billed as Irene Kane, is the writer Chris Chase, whose work has frequently appeared in The New York Times. Frank Silvera [sic] plays the boxer, whose career is described as 'one long promise without fulfillment.' (Note: Maslin's erroneous substitution of co-star Silvera for the film's leading man, Jamie Smith—indeed, the omission of the latter's name altogether–could not help but underline the irony already inherent in the film's line, "one long promise without fulfillment," as it relates to Smith's decidedly in-like-lion, out-like-lamb professional acting career.) In the case of Mr. Kubrick's own career, the fulfillment came later. But here is the promise.

=== Awards ===
Wins

- Locarno International Film Festival: Prize, Best Director, Stanley Kubrick; 1959.

=== Adaptation ===
In 1983 Matthew Chapman directed Strangers Kiss, a film that portrayed the making of Killer's Kiss.

== Home media ==
The film was released on DVD and Blu-ray as a special feature of The Criterion Collection's release of Kubrick's The Killing. A 4K UHD Blu-ray was released by Kino Lorber on June 28, 2022.

On June 22, 2026, it was announced that the film would be re-released on 4K as part of The Criterion Collection's release of The Complete Kubrick box set.
