= The Killing (film) =

1956 film by Stanley Kubrick

- Theatrical release poster
- Directed by: Stanley Kubrick
- Screenplay by: Stanley Kubrick
- Dialogue by: Jim Thompson
- Based on: Clean Break by Lionel White
- Produced by: James B. Harris
- Starring: Sterling Hayden; Coleen Gray; Vince Edwards; Jay C. Flippen; Marie Windsor; Ted de Corsia
- Cinematography: Lucien Ballard
- Edited by: Betty Steinberg
- Music by: Gerald Fried
- Production company: Harris-Kubrick Pictures Corporation
- Distributed by: United Artists
- Release date: May 19, 1956 (New York City)
- Running time: 84 minutes
- Country: United States
- Language: English
- Budget: $320,000

The Killing is a 1956 American film noir directed by Stanley Kubrick and produced by James B. Harris. It was written by Kubrick and Jim Thompson and based on Lionel White's novel Clean Break. It stars Sterling Hayden, Coleen Gray, and Vince Edwards, and features Marie Windsor, Elisha Cook Jr., Jay C. Flippen and Timothy Carey.

The film was Kubrick's third directorial effort and was generally well received by critics.

== Plot ==
Johnny Clay, a career criminal recently released from prison, plans a heist at a thoroughbred racetrack, with an estimated take of two million dollars (equivalent to twenty-four million in 2025). His associate Marvin Unger provides financial backing for the plot, makes his apartment available as a hideout, and provides its address to two of the track's employees: cashier George Peatty, and bartender Mike O'Reilly. Corrupt police officer Randy Kennan joins the scheme. George, trapped in a loveless marriage with his materialistic wife Sherry, confesses the plan to her, which she immediately communicates to her boyfriend Val.

At the hideout, the five men conspire regarding the details of the heist. Johnny discloses that two other men will be involved, and paid low, flat fees for their roles: a sharpshooter will kill the favored horse in the race to sow confusion, and a wrestler will make a scene at the bar to create a diversion. Sherry is discovered to be eavesdropping on the plot, and the others separate George and Sherry. Johnny orders Sherry not to interfere further until the heist is completed.

On the morning of the heist, Marvin expresses paternal feelings for Johnny, suggesting that they go away together following its completion. Johnny rebuffs this suggestion, ordering Marvin to stay away from the track while the heist is in progress. Mike smuggles a gun into the track's locker room, opposite its money room. Marvin, who is very drunk, appears at the track, against Johnny's wishes, and to the disturbance of the others. The sharpshooter Nikki is stopped at the gate to the parking lot adjacent to the track as it has not yet opened, and feigns being a paraplegic as a result of a war wound. He wins the confidence of the African American guard who lets him in. Nikki continues to act kind when the guard visits him where Nikki is parked in position to shoot the horse.

Despite Marvin's drunkenness, all others are in position, and they commit to the heist. As the wrestler starts a fight at the bar, drawing security away from the money room, George helps Johnny access the locker room. Johnny acquires the gun, dons a mask, and holds up the money room as the horse is shot, throwing a sack of money out the window, where Randy collects it. When the guard visits Nikki a second time to give him a lucky horseshoe before the shooting Nikki drops the pretense, calling the guard a racial slur, and the guard storms off, throwing the horseshoe on the ground. When Nikki attempts to get away his tire is punctured when he unknowingly drives over the horseshoe preventing his escape, and he is shot dead.

At the hideout, the others await the return of Johnny, now in possession of the money. Val ambushes the hideout, a shootout ensues, and a wounded George is left as the last man standing. As George stumbles outside, Johnny sees that something is clearly wrong, and continues driving. He purchases a large suitcase, transfers the money into it, and struggles to secure it. George returns to his apartment, kills Sherry, and collapses. At the airport, Johnny reunites with his girlfriend Fay. They fail to register the suitcase as carry-on luggage, and have no choice but to check it. The suitcase falls off a cart and bursts open, and the money is scattered by a propeller. After Johnny is recognized by authorities, Fay urges him to run but he refuses, calmly accepting his fate.

== Cast ==
- Sterling Hayden as Johnny Clay
- Coleen Gray as Fay White
- Vince Edwards as Val Cannon
- Jay C. Flippen as Marvin Unger
- Elisha Cook Jr. as George Peatty
- Marie Windsor as Sherry Peatty
- Ted de Corsia as Policeman Randy Kennan
- Joe Sawyer as Mike O'Reilly
- James Edwards as Track Parking Attendant
- Timothy Carey as Nikki Arano
- Tito Vuolo as Joe "Piano"
- Joe Turkel as "Tiny"
- Jay Adler as Leo, The Loanshark
- James Griffith as Mr. Grimes
- Kola Kwariani as Maurice Oboukhoff
- Dorothy Adams as Mrs. Ruthie O'Reilly
- Art Gilmore as The Narrator

== Production ==
While playing chess in Washington Square, Kubrick met producer James B. Harris, who had sold his film distribution company and was looking for a new young talent. Harris considered Kubrick "the most intelligent, most creative person [he had] ever come in contact with", and the two formed the Harris-Kubrick Pictures Corporation in 1955. Harris purchased the rights to Lionel White's novel Clean Break for $10,000, beating United Artists, which was interested in the film as a vehicle for Frank Sinatra. At Kubrick's suggestion they hired hardboiled fiction novelist Jim Thompson to write the script. On screen, Kubrick is credited with the screenplay, and Thompson for "dialogue", although Thompson did the majority of the scriptwriting work.

United Artists told the pair that it would help finance the picture if Harris and Kubrick could find a high-profile actor to star. They signed Sterling Hayden, who agreed to accept $40,000. But Hayden was not a big enough star for UA, which wound up providing only $200,000 for the film; Harris financed the rest using $80,000 of his own money and a $50,000 loan from his father. The film was the first of three on which Harris and Kubrick collaborated as producer and director over less than ten years. Working titles for the film were Clean Break and Bed of Fear. It was the last feature film completely filmed by Kubrick in the United States (interiors for Spartacus were shot on Universal's Hollywood sound stages, but its battle exteriors were shot in Spain).

Three members of the cast—Hayden, Ted de Corsia, and Timothy Carey—had appeared together the previous year in the low-budget noir film Crime Wave. The art director, Ruth Sobotka, was Kubrick's wife at the time. Kubrick and Harris moved from New York to L.A. to shoot the picture, and Kubrick went unpaid during the shooting, surviving on loans from Harris. In addition to Hayden, Kubrick cast actors from films noirs he liked, such as Carey, de Corsia, Elisha Cook Jr. and Marie Windsor. He chose former professional wrestler and old chess friend Kola Kwariani to play an aging, chess-playing grappler. The Hollywood cinematographers' union told Kubrick that he could not be both director and cinematographer, so veteran cinematographer Lucien Ballard was hired; he and Kubrick often clashed over camera placement and technical details.

== Reception ==
=== Theatrical run ===
Without a proper release across the U.S., The Killing performed poorly at the box office. In spite of a last-minute promotion as a second feature to Bandido! it failed to turn a profit. But it was critically acclaimed, and appeared on several critics' top-ten lists for 1956. Time wrongly predicted that it would "make a killing at the cash booths"—asserting that Kubrick "has shown more audacity with dialogue and camera than Hollywood has seen since the obstreperous Orson Welles went riding out of town on an exhibitors' poll"—as the film recorded a loss of $130,000.

=== Contemporaneous critical response ===
New York Times film critic A. H. Weiler wrote, "Though The Killing is composed of familiar ingredients and it calls for fuller explanations, it evolves as a fairly diverting melodrama. ... Aficionados of the sport of kings will discover that Mr. Kubrick's cameras have captured some colorful shots of the ponies at Bay Meadows track. Other observers should find The Killing an engrossing little adventure."

Variety liked the acting and wrote, "This story of a $2 million race track holdup and steps leading up to the robbery, occasionally told in a documentary style which at first tends to be somewhat confusing, soon settles into a tense and suspenseful vein which carries through to an unexpected and ironic windup ... Hayden socks over a restrained characterization, and Cook is a particular standout. Windsor is particularly good, as she digs the plan out of her husband and reveals it to her boyfriend."

The Chicago Tribune wrote: “This is one of those terse (Jack Webb style dialog), low key (so low there are times when you don’t know what the actors are muttering about) crime tales which consist of a number of episodes woven, not very neatly, into a whole….The thinness of the plot is almost, but not quite, covered by the cast playing an odd assortment of unattractive characters….Hayden…Sawyer…Cook, and…Windsor give good performances and a documentary helps convey an impression of realism, but to me it’s just another crime story.”

Kubrick and Harris thought the positive critical reception had made their presence known in Hollywood, but Max Youngstein of United Artists still considered them "not far from the bottom" of the pool of new talent at the time. Dore Schary of Metro-Goldwyn-Mayer was impressed with the film, and offered the duo $75,000 to write, direct and produce another, which became Paths of Glory.

=== Retrospective assessment ===
The Killing has gained a cult following, among other Kubrick films. For example, Eddie Muller placed the film 15th among his top 25 favorite noir films, saying, "If you believe that a good script is a succession of great scenes, you can't do better than this. Hey, that scene was so good, let's do it again from somebody else's perspective".

In 1998, Jonathan Rosenbaum of the Chicago Reader included the film in his unranked list of the best American films not included on the AFI Top 100.

In 1999, film critic Mike Emery wrote, "Kubrick's camerawork was well on the way to finding the fluid style of his later work, and the sparse, low-budget circumstances give the film a raw, urgent sort of look. As good as the story and direction are, though, the true strength of The Killing lies in the characters and characterizations." The same year, director Peter Bogdanovich wrote in The New York Times that while The Killing did not make money, it, along with Paths of Glory, established "Kubrick's reputation as a budding genius among critics and studio executives."

In 2012, Roger Ebert added The Killing to his list of "Great Movies". In his opening remarks, Ebert writes, "Stanley Kubrick considered The Killing (1956) to be his first mature feature, after a couple of short warm-ups. He was 28 when it was released, having already been an obsessed chess player, a photographer for Look magazine and a director of March of Time newsreels. It's tempting to search here for themes and a style he would return to in his later masterpieces, but few directors seemed so determined to make every one of his films an individual, free-standing work. Seeing it without his credit, would you guess it was by Kubrick? Would you connect Dr. Strangelove with Barry Lyndon?"

On the review aggregator website Rotten Tomatoes, 96% of 75 critics' reviews are positive, with an average rating of 8.9/10. The website's consensus reads: "An expertly crafted noir with more on its mind than stylishly staged violence, The Killing establishes Stanley Kubrick as a filmmaker of uncommon vision and control." Metacritic, which uses a weighted average, assigned the film a score of 91 out of 100, based on 15 critics, indicating "universal acclaim".

=== Awards ===
Nominations

- BAFTA Film Award, Best Film from any Source, USA; 1957.

=== Influence ===
Quentin Tarantino has said that this film was an influence on Reservoir Dogs, that he thought of that film as "my Killing, my take on that kind of heist movie."

== Home media ==
A digitally restored version of The Killing was released on DVD and Blu-ray by The Criterion Collection, which also included Killer's Kiss as a bonus feature. On July 26, 2022, Kino Lorber (under the KL Studio Classics line) released a Ultra HD Blu-ray edition of the film from a new remaster of the original negative with new audio commentary by film historian Alan K. Rode.

On June 22, 2026, it was announced that the film would be later re-released on 4K as part of The Complete Kubrick box set by The Criterion Collection.

== See also ==
- List of American films of 1956
- Heist film

== Sources ==
- Duncan, Paul (2003). Stanley Kubrick: The Complete Films. Taschen GmbH. ISBN 978-3836527750.
