= List of films shot in Thailand =

This is a list of foreign films shot in Thailand. See also: List of Thai films

Numerous foreign films have been shot in Thailand, with the kingdom either playing itself or standing in for a neighboring country, such as Vietnam or Cambodia.

The availability of exotic jungle and beach settings, relatively low production costs, and a mature domestic film industry that provides experienced crew members have made Thailand an attractive location for many international productions.

Notable films shot in Thailand include The Big Boss, The Man with the Golden Gun, and The Beach. The country has also served as a stand-in setting for Vietnam War-era films such as The Deer Hunter; Good Morning, Vietnam; Casualties of War; and The Killing Fields.

While foreign productions provide valuable jobs for local crews and help promote Thailand as a global tourist destination, they have also drawn criticism for damaging the natural environment. High-profile shoots for films like The Man with the Golden Gun and The Beach have sparked long-term ecological concerns due to physical location alterations and the subsequent influx of film-driven tourism.

== History ==
Hollywood and foreign productions have played an important role in the development of Thailand's film industry. One of the first feature films made in Thailand, 1923's Miss Suwanna of Siam, was a Hollywood co-production made with the royal assistance of King Vajiravudh. He granted the production free use of his 52 automobiles, 600 horses, the Royal Thai Navy, the Grand Palace, railways, rice mills, rice fields, coconut groves, canals, and elephants.

Shortly after, the 1927 silent documentary Chang: A Drama of the Wilderness, directed by Merian C. Cooper and Ernest B. Schoedsack, was also filmed in the country.

Over the decades, Thailand has remained a popular location for Western cinema. The Bollywood film industry has also frequently chosen the country for its productions, a trend that took off following the massive success of the 2000 hit Kaho Naa... Pyaar Hai.

== Economic impact and incentives ==
Foreign productions provide work for local film crews and extras, including the Royal Thai Army, while also promoting the country as a tourist destination. Due to this economic impact, agencies such as the Tourism Authority of Thailand (TAT) and the Thailand Film Office actively recruit international production companies.

At the 2016 Cannes Film Festival, Thailand introduced a cash rebate policy that officially took effect in January 2017. The program grants a 15% tax rebate for foreign film productions that spend more than 50 million baht. The rebate increases by 2% for films that promote Thai tourism, and an additional 3% if the production hires key Thai personnel on set. Filmed advertisements are not eligible for the program.

Following the implementation of these incentives, 714 foreign productions—including documentaries, television dramas, series, advertisements, and feature films—were shot in Thailand in 2018. During the first six months of 2019, 410 foreign productions were filmed in the country, which the TAT reported contributed 3.5 billion baht to the local economy.

Since 2024, a 30% uncapped cash rebate has spurred a surge in major productions, including Alien: Earth and Jurassic World Rebirth. Media-driven tourism, or "set-jetting," has further boosted the economy; The White Lotus generated $36.5 million in local spending and sparked a 300% increase in travel bookings to Thailand.

== Environmental controversies ==
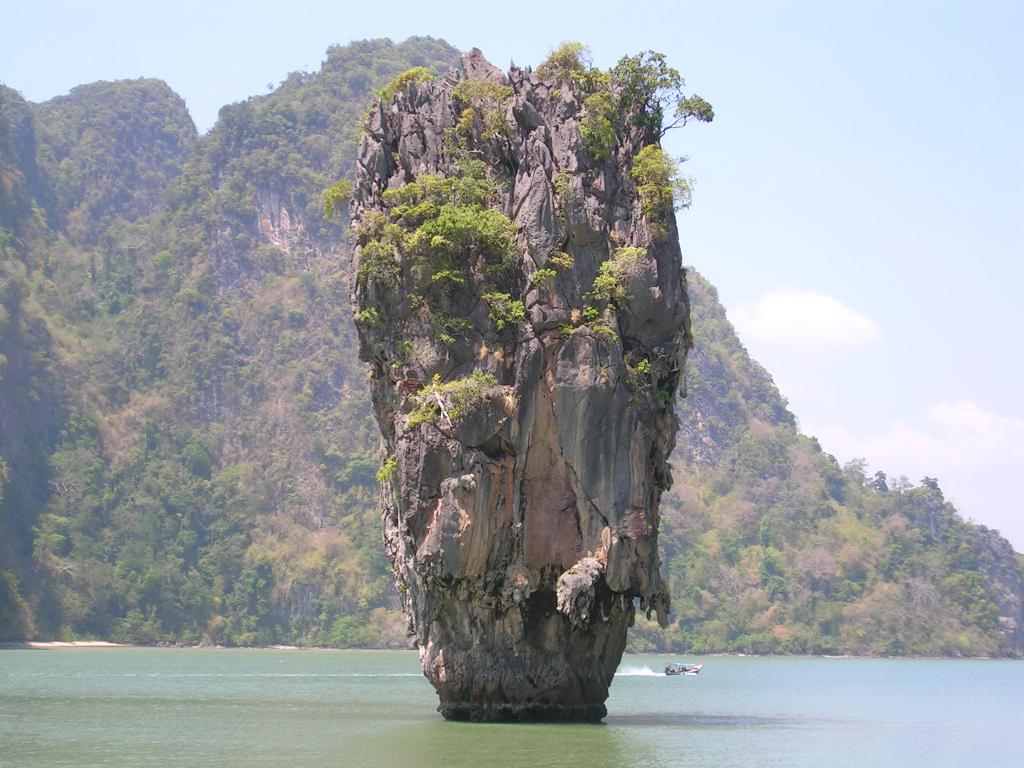
"James Bond Island," in Phang Nga Bay, featured in The Man with the Golden Gun.

Filmmakers have occasionally faced criticism for damaging the Thai environment during production. The island used to depict the villain's hideout in The Man with the Golden Gun became a major draw for tourism operators in Phuket's Phang Nga Bay. Now commonly known as "James Bond Island," the location faces long-term concerns over ecological sustainability and crowding.

Environmentalists also heavily protested the filming of the 2000 film The Beach, arguing that the production crew's physical alterations to Maya Bay on Ko Phi Phi Le caused severe ecological damage.

== List of foreign films shot in Thailand ==
=== 1920s–1970s ===
- Nangsao Suwan (Suvarna of Siam) (1922-US): Directed by Henry MacRae. A love story with a Thai cast. The film has been lost; only a few stills survive.
- Chang: A Drama of the Wilderness (1927-US) – Directors Merian C. Cooper and Ernest B. Schoedsack were assisted by Prince Yugala Dighambara in the production of their silent docudrama about a family of subsistence farmers living in the jungle, battling elephants, tigers and other animals. Among the cast is a gibbon named Bimbo.
- A Handful of Rice (1940-Sweden): Portrays Thailand's rural life in docudrama form.
- Around the World in Eighty Days (1956): Director Michael Todd was able to borrow one of the royal barges of King Bhumibol Adulyadej when the production was in Bangkok.
- Yutthana Siriporn (1963-Germany): Depicts urban life in Bangkok in the early 1960s and examines a Buddhist rite.
- The Ugly American (1963-US): Thai statesman Kukrit Pramoj appeared on screen with Marlon Brando, portraying the prime minister of the fictional Southeast Asian country of Sarkhan. He was later elected Prime Minister of Thailand, serving in office from 1975 to 1976.
- Shadow of Evil (Banco à Bangkok pour OSS 117) (1964-FR): Secret Agent OSS 117, Colonel Hubert Bonisseur de La Bath (Kerwin Mathews) is sent to Thailand following the murder of OSS agent Christopher Lemmon.
- The Big Boss (1971): Chinese American martial artist and Jeet Kune Do founder Bruce Lee portrays Cheng Chao-An, a young fighter from Guangdong who emigrates to Thailand to be with his expatriate family and finds a job working in an ice factory; it soon turns out that the factory is a disguised drug operation, and Cheng soon finds himself having to fight for his life. After the original 1971 premiere, Hong Kong censors demanded that some of the footage be trimmed, including graphic violence, and an entire sequence in which Cheng visits a whorehouse and has sex with a Thai prostitute (featuring the only nude scene in Lee's career). The missing footage is rumoured to still exist.
- Duel of Fists (1971): David Chiang travels to Bangkok looking for his long-lost brother (Ti Lung), who's a muay Thai boxer in this Shaw Brothers Studio film by Chang Cheh. Pawana Chanachit co-starred as a love interest for Chiang's character. Locations include the Dusit Thani Hotel on Rama IV Road, long before overpass bridges and the Bangkok Skytrain were built, as well as the Siam Intercontinental, since razed to make way for Siam Paragon.
- Ulagam Sutrum Valiban (1973): Produced and directed by MGR, a Tamil movie released in 1973 has Bangkok and the Dusit Thani Hotel.
- Emmanuelle (1974): Filmed around Bangkok.
- The Man with the Golden Gun (1974) – Filmed around Bangkok and Phang Nga Bay near Phuket. Bond attended a boxing match at Ratchadamnoen Boxing Stadium in Pom Prap Sattru Phai District. One of the islands seen in the film is known as Nail Island. It is the hideout of Scaramanga (Christopher Lee) and is now known as "James Bond Island".
- The Deer Hunter (1978): The Russian roulette bar scene was shot in Patpong, while the POW camp was in Sai Yok, Kanchanaburi Province.

=== 1980s ===
- Uncommon Valor (1983): Set in Laos but filmed partly in Bangkok. Lao scenery was filmed in Hawaii.
- The Killing Fields (1984-US): Locations in Hua Hin and Phuket stood in for Khmer Rouge-era Cambodia. Actor Spalding Gray recounts the film's shoot in his monologue, Swimming to Cambodia.
- Rambo: First Blood Part II (1985-US): Sylvester Stallone's super soldier goes to Vietnam (actually Thailand) looking for his POW buddies. Followed by Rambo III, set in Afghanistan, but partially shot in Thailand.
- Good Morning, Vietnam (1987-US): Thai actress Jintara Sukapat portrayed the love interest for Robin Williams' character. Filmed on location in Bangkok, standing in for pre-1975 Saigon.
- Off Limits (1988): Christopher Crowe's Vietnam War crime thriller featured Willem Dafoe and Gregory Hines. The film is also known as Saigon.
- Casualties of War (1989-US): Brian De Palma's Vietnam War saga was filmed around Phuket and Kanchanaburi.
- Kickboxer (1989): Jean-Claude Van Damme movie about a Westerner who learns muay Thai.

=== 1990s ===
- Air America (1990): Mae Hong Son Province in northern Thailand stands in for Secret War-era Laos. The film later attracted tourism to the region and was featured on the cover of Conde Nast Traveller in May 1993.
- Turtle Beach (1992)
- Heaven & Earth (1993-US): Oliver Stone's Vietnam War-era drama was made in Thailand.
- Surf Ninjas (1993-US)
- Operation Dumbo Drop (1995-US): Walt Disney Pictures' Vietnam War comedy-drama features Thai elephants.
- Cutthroat Island (1995): Renny Harlin's swashbuckler was filmed on location in Maya Bay, which would later be used for The Beach.
- Mortal Kombat Annihilation (1997): Tony Jaa worked as a stunt double and went on to become a major Thai action star. Filming was in historic old Ayutthaya, where a minor stir was caused when scantily clad foreign women were filmed dancing on top of some sacred ruins. Mortal Kombat (1995) also was made in Thailand, around Sukhothai historical park. The opening and closing scenes in Mortal Kombat are also filmed in Ayutthaya.
- Tomorrow Never Dies (1997): Another Bond film and another Bond. Michelle Yeoh co-stars, as Bangkok stands in for Ho Chi Minh City. Scaramanga's island is seen, as Phang Nga Bay substitutes for Halong Bay, Vietnam. Production crew originally were destined to film in Vietnam but were denied entry. Thailand was chosen as an alternate location.
- A Bright Shining Lie (1998)
- Brokedown Palace (1999): Clair Danes and Kate Beckinsale are arrested for smuggling while visiting Thailand. It was partly shot in Bangkok and the Bangkok airport.
- Bangkok Dangerous (1999): Directed by Oxide and Danny Pang. A Thai hit-man story by Hong Kong directors.

=== 2000–2003 ===
- The Beach (2000-US): Environmentalists protested the film because the production crew altered the beach of Ko Phi Phi Leh. A 2006 court ruling held that 20th Century Fox was among the parties responsible for damages.
- In the Mood for Love (2000): Wong Kar-wai's love story starring Maggie Cheung and Tony Leung Chiu Wai is set in 1960s Hong Kong, but exterior scenes were filmed in Bangkok.
- Butterfly Man (2002): About a British tourist and a Thai masseuse. Directed by Kaprice Kea.
- City of Ghosts (2002): Matt Dillon's noirish thriller was set in Cambodia and mostly filmed there, but some scenes were shot in Thailand, and many of the crew were Thai people.
- The Medallion (2003): Jackie Chan's action picture was filmed in Thailand under the working title, Highbinders.
- Belly of the Beast (2003): Steven Seagal portrays a former CIA agent who searches in Thailand for his kidnapped daughter. Co-stars Thai actors Sarah Malakul, Pongpat Wachirabanjong, and Chakrit Yamnam.

=== 2004 ===
- 2046: Wong Kar-wai's follow-up to In the Mood for Love was filmed partially in Bangkok, and the film underwent post-production processing at Bangkok's Kantana Group labs, where the director made last-minute edits to the film before delivering it late to the 2004 Cannes Film Festival.
- Two Brothers: This family-friendly story about two tigers had some scenes made in Samut Prakan Province, at a tourist site called Mueang Boran (Ancient City), which has scaled-down replicas of many of Thailand's important structures. The tigers used in the film were from the Si Racha Tiger Zoo near Pattaya. The film was set in neighboring Cambodia, and many locations were used there was well.
- Alexander (2004-US): Oliver Stone's epic starring Colin Farrell as Alexander the Great was filmed along the Mekong River in northeastern Ubon Ratchathani Province and in Saraburi Province. Royal Thai Army soldiers were used as extras. Thai actors Bin Bunluerit and Jaran Ngamdee portrayed an Indian king and an Indian prince, respectively.
- Around the World in 80 Days (2004): This Jackie Chan/Steve Coogan remake of the 1956 film was filmed in Thailand, with scenes shot in Krabi that were meant to take place in a rural village in China. Sammo Hung makes an appearance as Wong Fei Hung.
- Bridget Jones: The Edge of Reason: Made in Bangkok and Phuket, including Bangkok's Soi Cowboy. Tabloid reports that Hugh Grant was chased by bargirls were false.

=== 2005 ===
- Ghost of Nak (2005): A film version of the Mae Nak Phra Khanong legend by a British director.
- Star Wars: Episode III – Revenge of the Sith (2005): The approach to Kashyyyk, the Wookiee homeworld, was filmed around Krabi Province by Santa Film International.
- Stealth (2005): Jamie Foxx, Jessica Biel, and Josh Lucas portray high-tech US Navy aviators. Rest and relaxation scenes are set in Thailand and were filmed on The Beach island, Ko Phi Phi Leh. Neighboring Myanmar is the setting for a missile target, but those scenes were filmed in Australia.
- Blackbeard (2005): With Angus Macfadyen, Stacy Keach, Richard Chamberlain, and Rachel Ward, was filmed in Surat Thani and Nakorn Si Thammarat by Living Films. The story depicts the exploits of English pirate Edward Teach, better known as Captain Blackbeard. Blackbeard roamed the Caribbean in the 18th century. The swashbuckling adventure story appears to take place primarily in the Caribbean city of New Providence in 1717.

=== 2006 ===
- The Elephant King (2006): Directed by Seth Grossman.
- Journey from the Fall: Unable to make his film at home, Vietnamese director Ham Tran came to Thailand to make his drama about Vietnam's re-education camps and the experience of boat people.
- Tsunami: The Aftermath (2006): The HBO-BBC joint production came to Phuket in April–June 2006 to film a mini-series about the 26 December 2004 Indian Ocean earthquake and the resulting tsunami that hit Thailand's Andaman coastline.

=== 2007 ===
- American Gangster (2007-US): Directed by Ridley Scott and starring Denzel Washington and Russell Crowe, the story of an American heroin smuggler was filmed in November 2006 in Chiang Mai.
- Croc (2007): This Thai Occidental Productions movie about a large man-eating crocodile, was filmed in Thailand in 2006. Michael Madsen, who plays a crocodile hunter in the film, was in Thailand for the filming. The movie has played on Sky One in the UK, the Sci Fi Channel (United States) channel in the US, and Star Movies in Asia.
- Rambo (2007-US): Sylvester Stallone returned to Thailand to make the fourth installment in his Rambo franchise, directing and starring as the Vietnam War veteran who takes on a mission to protect Christian missionaries delivering aid to the Karen people in Myanmar. Filming was due to start in January 2007.
- Rescue Dawn (2007): Werner Herzog came to Thailand in August 2005 to direct this true story of US pilot Dieter Dengler and his escape from a POW camp during the Vietnam War. It stars Christian Bale and Steve Zahn.
- Lady Bar (2007-FR): The film addresses sex tourism and more generally the situation of farangs in Thailand.

=== 2008 ===
- Bangkok Dangerous (also called Big Hit in Bangkok or Time to Kill) (2008): A remake of Bangkok Dangerous by the Pang Brothers, it stars Nicolas Cage and Charlie Yeung and began shooting in Bangkok in August 2006. Production was delayed by the coup d'état.

=== 2009 ===
- Soi Cowboy (2009): The story of a European man and a Thai woman. Directed by Thomas Clay.
- Street Fighter: The Legend of Chun-Li: The second live-action film based on the Street Fighter series of video games. Set in Bangkok.
- Lady Bar 2 (FR): Sequel from Lady Bar (2007)

=== 2010–19 ===
Release year	Title	Notes
2010	The Prince and Me 4: The Elephant Adventure	It is a sequel to The Prince and Me 3: A Royal Honeymoon.
2010	Shanghai	Completed filming in 2008, but was not released theatrically in China until 2010.
2011	The Hangover Part II	Two years after the bachelor party in Las Vegas, Phil, Stu, Alan, and Doug jet to Thailand for Stu's wedding.
2012	The Impossible	The story of a tourist family vacationing in Khao Lak caught up in the destruction and chaotic aftermath of the 2004 Indian Ocean tsunami.
2012	The Scorpion King 3: Battle for Redemption	The third installment of The Scorpion King film series.
2012	Lost in Thailand	Chinese comedy about a tourist and two competitive scientists searching for their boss.
2013	Only God Forgives	Nicolas Winding Refn film starring Ryan Gosling and Kristin Scott Thomas. Set in Bangkok.
2013	The Railway Man	British–Australian drama film, based on the memoirs of Eric Lomax, a British officer captured by the Japanese and forced to work on the railway. The film was partly filmed around Kanchanaburi Province.
2013	Patong Girl	An award-winning boy-meets-girl film with a twist by Susanna Salonen.
2014	Siam–Burma Death Railway	A documentary about the Asian labourers (Indian Tamils, Burmese, and Javanese) who worked like slaves on the Siam (Thailand) – Burma death railway line during World War II.
2015	No Escape	An action movie filmed in Thailand, released by the Weinstein Co. The film is based on a fictional story of an American family trying to escape a fictitious coup in an unidentified country in Southeast Asia. Principal actors include Pierce Brosnan, Lake Bell, and Owen Wilson.
2016	All I See Is You	
2016	Mechanic: Resurrection	Partly shot in Bangkok.
2016	Gold	
2016	The Forest	Directed by Paul Spurrier.
2016	Bangkok Nites	Part of the filming was done in Soi Thaniya, the Japanese red district in Bangkok. Other parts were shot in Isan.
2017	A Prayer Before Dawn	
2017	Ghost House	
2017	Pop Aye	Singapore film directed by Kirsten Tan. The story of a man who strives to return an elephant to its birthplace.
2019	Paradise Beach	A French film about French gangsters who flee to Phuket after robbing a bank and getting away with 2.4 million euros.
2019	Changeland	Seth Green's directorial debut was shot on-location in Thailand.

=== 2020–present ===
Release year	Title	Notes
2020	Extraction	Partly shot in Ratchaburi.
2020	Da 5 Bloods	Spike Lee's war film was shot primarily in Chiang Mai.
2020	Tremors: Shrieker Island	Don Michael Paul's monster film was shot in Thailand.
2021	F9	Partly shot in Krabi, Ko Pha-ngan, and Phuket.
2021	Infinite	The science fiction action film directed by Antoine Fuqua was shot in Thailand.
2022	The Greatest Beer Run Ever	
2022	Thirteen Lives	
2022	Fistful of Vengeance	Roel Reiné's supernatural action film was shot in Thailand.
2023	The Creator	Partly shot in many locations, including Bangkok, Kanchanaburi, and Chiang Mai.
2023	Meg 2: The Trench	
2023	Influencer	Psychological thriller set in Thailand that follows a serial killer who targets social media influencers
2024	Mother of the Bride	
2025	Jurassic World Rebirth	
2026	Killer Whale	
2026	Send Help	
2026	Beast	
2026	Fall 2: Deadpoint	
2027	John Rambo	

== List of films set in Thailand ==
Several films have been set in Thailand, but were made elsewhere. These include:

- Anna and the King of Siam (1946): The first film adaptation of stories written by Anna Leonowens. The film is still banned in Thailand for historical inaccuracies and because Thai authorities claim its depiction of King Mongkut denigrates and trivializes the monarch and the royal family. It was filmed in California.
- The King and I (1956): The film of the musical is banned in Thailand for the same reasons as Anna and the King of Siam.
- The Bridge on the River Kwai (1957): Based on a novel by Pierre Boulle, David Lean's highly fictionalized account of work on the Death Railway contains many historical inaccuracies. It was filmed in Ceylon.
- Uncommon Valor (1983): A scene depicting the Laotian-Thai border was filmed in Hawaii.
- Missing in Action (1984) and Braddock: Missing in Action III (1988): Chuck Norris's two films were partially set in Bangkok but filmed in the Philippines.
- Anna and the King (1999): With a Thai adviser and many Thai actors in the cast, Andy Tennant's remake of the 1946 film went through several rewrites in an effort to win approval by the Thai government so the movie could be made and shown there. However, the screenplay still contained too many inaccuracies, so the production was moved to Malaysia. The film is banned in Thailand, though video copies have found their way into the kingdom, and the film has gained a following.
- Brokedown Palace (1999): Alice and Darlene, best friends, decide to take a trip to Thailand to celebrate high-school graduation. While there, they are befriended by charming Australian rogue Nick Parks. Nick convinces them to take a weekend side trip to Hong Kong, but at the airport, they are busted for smuggling drugs. They are convicted in a show trial and sentenced to 33 years; in desperation, they contact Yankee Hank, an American lawyer based in Thailand who has been reported to be helpful if you've got the cash. Most scenes were filmed in the Philippines.
- Bright Rainbow After the Rain (2010): The movie is unique in the sense that it is in English and it could be known as the first English movie in Thailand done by Thai students. The movie was filmed in Phayao Province. It is drama about two girls who were best friends- น.ส.สิริพร จันทร์เอี่ยม (Siripon Janauem) as Ana and น.ส.ณัฐณิชา ขอนพิกุล (Natnicha Khonpikul) as Sara. Ana was rich and Sara was poor with no father when she was growing up. Sara's mother sells vegetables at the market for a living. Sara helped her mother by having a part-time job. Sara's best friend Ana wants to study overseas and searches the internet to find overseas scholarships available for Thais. Sara also wanted to study overseas, but didn't have the confidence to apply. Finally, Ana finds a scholarship abroad in Canada, but seeing her very poor best friend struggling in poverty has brought pain in her heart and has become her turning point. She cannot stand to see her best friend having so many difficulties in life while she is enjoying life's comforts. So Ana decided to help Sara escape poverty, but wants to do it secretly. She pretends to be Sara and applies for a scholarship in Sara's name. Ana does this without Sara's knowledge. She steals Sara's personal information and passport to complete Sara's scholarship application. Ana wants to study abroad, but had to sacrifice her dream for the sake of her best friend. At the end, Sara gets a scholarship in Canada through Ana's secret help. The "Bright Rainbow After the Rain" is the first English movie in Thailand with Thai students as the cast. The director Alejandro Cardeinte is an English teacher teaching at Phayao Pittayakhom School (โรงเรียนพะเยาพิทยาคม). The goal of the movie is to help Thai students learn English. The movie has English subtitles but no Thai subtitles. The movie uses simple day-to-day English. The film's soundtrack was written by the movie director himself. But partly, some music he used is not cleared with copyright yet. The movie is for educational purposes only and not for business.
- Thirteen Lives (2022): Ron Howard's film, based on the Tham Luang cave rescue, shot in Australia. Gold Coast, Queensland stands in for Thailand.

== List of foreign television shows shot in Thailand ==
Release year	Title	Notes
1989	Bangkok Hilton	
2015	Strike Back: Legacy	The fifth series of Strike Back
2017	Gap Year	
2020	The Flight Attendant	The first season was partly shot in Bangkok.
2021	The Serpent	Partly shot in many locations, including Bangkok and Hua Hin.
2022	Ms. Marvel	Partly shot in Bangkok. Thailand stands in for Pakistan.
2022	Shantaram	Thailand stands in for India after production delays impacted the original filming plan.
2022	Thai Cave Rescue	
2024	The Sympathizer	Partly shot in Bangkok, Nakhon Si Thammarat, and Hat Yai. Thailand stands in for Vietnam.
2025	The Night Agent	The second season was partly shot in Bangkok.
2025	The White Lotus	The third season was shot in Bangkok, Phuket, and Ko Samui.
2025	Alien: Earth	The first season was shot in Bangkok, Ko Samui, and Krabi.

== See also ==
- Cinema of Thailand
- List of Thai films
