= Corona's Coming Attractions =

Coming Attractions
- Website type: Film
- Available in: English
- Owner: Patrick Sauriol
- Creator: Patrick Sauriol
- Website: coronacomingattractions.com
- Launched: April 1995
- Current status: Inactive as of 2017

Corona Coming Attractions was one of the first websites to report on Hollywood films in development. The website got its start being a repository for collecting news tidbits about an initial 12 movie projects, gathering news breaks from magazines, television reports, and newspapers. However, within a few short months after its launch, the website began to receive emails from people working on the movies, from the crew, special effects technicians, agents that represented the above the line talent, studio personnel involved with the creative development of the project and ordinary people that had taken photographs or heard first-hand reports from movie projects that were shooting in their region of the country.

The site is credited with inspiring a wave of other movie news websites including Ain't It Cool News, Dark Horizons, JoBlo, Latino Review, Coming Soon, and others.

== Exclusive Scoops Broken by Coming Attractions ==
Throughout its many years online Coming Attractions has published many exclusive stories including on-set photographs of Stanley Kubrick's final film Eyes Wide Shut, the first image of Tobey Maguire in 2002's Spider-Man movie, casting news, and set reports from Star Wars: Episode I – The Phantom Menace, reports on the design of Roland Emmerich's 1998 Godzilla creature, a review of the pilot screenplay for The Walking Dead TV series and casting details on Marvel Studios' Thor.

== Awards and nominations ==
Nominated for a 1999 Webby Award for Best Film Website
