= Eyes Wide Shut =

1999 film by Stanley Kubrick

- Theatrical release poster
- Directed by: Stanley Kubrick
- Screenplay by: Stanley Kubrick; Frederic Raphael
- Based on: Traumnovelle by Arthur Schnitzler
- Produced by: Stanley Kubrick
- Starring: Tom Cruise; Nicole Kidman; Sydney Pollack; Todd Field
- Cinematography: Larry Smith
- Edited by: Nigel Galt
- Music by: Jocelyn Pook
- Production companies: Stanley Kubrick Productions; Pole Star; Hobby Films
- Distributed by: Warner Bros.
- Release dates: July 13, 1999 (Los Angeles); July 16, 1999 (United States); September 10, 1999 (United Kingdom)
- Running time: 159 minutes
- Countries: United Kingdom; United States
- Language: English
- Budget: $65 million
- Box office: $162.1 million

Eyes Wide Shut is a 1999 erotic psychological mystery thriller film (Note: Critics and writers have attributed several different genres to the film. Linda Ruth Williams and others variously describe the film as an erotic thriller, and it was largely marketed as such. Numerous other sources describe the film as a psychological drama, while some academics and writers have also cited it as a horror film.) directed, produced, and co-written by Stanley Kubrick, and starring Tom Cruise and Nicole Kidman. The plot centers on a Manhattan doctor who is shocked when his wife reveals that she contemplated cheating on him. He embarks on a night-long adventure and infiltrates a masked orgy held by a secret society. It is based on the 1926 novella Dream Story (German: Traumnovelle) by Arthur Schnitzler, and transfers the story's setting from early twentieth-century Vienna to 1990s New York City.

Kubrick obtained the filming rights for Dream Story in the 1960s, considering it a perfect text for a film adaptation about sexual relations. He revived the project in the 1990s when he hired writer Frederic Raphael to help him with the adaptation. An international co-production between the United Kingdom and United States, principal photography of Eyes Wide Shut began in late 1996 in England, with a detailed recreation of exterior Greenwich Village street scenes built at Pinewood Studios. The film's production, at 400 days, holds the Guinness World Record for the longest continuous film shoot.

Following an extensive post-production process that began in early 1998, Kubrick submitted his final cut of the film to Warner Bros. on March 1, 1999, which was viewed by Cruise, Kidman, and studio executives. Kubrick died of a heart attack six days later. Some post-production was resumed the week after Kubrick's death, which led to some public debate over the film's state of completion. Warner Bros. began an extensive marketing campaign to promote the film in early 1999, though its publicity materials were vague in nature and marketed the film as an erotic thriller.

Eyes Wide Shut had its world premiere in Los Angeles on July 13, 1999, before being released in the United States on July 16 and in the United Kingdom on September 10. It received generally positive reviews from critics, and was nominated for numerous awards, including the Golden Globe Award for Best Original Score. The film was met with significant critical notice in France, receiving a César Award nomination for Best Foreign Film, as well as winning the award in the same category from the French Syndicate of Cinema Critics. It was also named the best film of the year by Cahiers du Cinéma in their annual top ten list. The film was a box-office success, earning $162 million worldwide, making it Kubrick's highest-grossing film in unadjusted dollars. It has undergone a more positive reevaluation by some modern critics, and has been listed in several polls of the best films of the 1990s.

== Plot ==
Dr. Bill Harford and his wife Alice live in New York City with their daughter Helena. At a Christmas party hosted by a patient, Victor Ziegler, Bill reunites with his medical school classmate Nick Nightingale, who now plays piano professionally. Party guests attempt to seduce Alice and Bill. Ziegler interrupts Bill with news of an overdose by Mandy, a woman he was having sex with. Bill helps Mandy recover.

The next night, while smoking marijuana, Alice and Bill discuss their unfulfilled temptations. Bill is not jealous of other men's attraction to Alice, believing women to be naturally faithful. Alice admits to fantasizing about a naval officer she met on vacation and considering leaving Bill and Helena. Bill is disturbed before being called to a patient's house. The patient's daughter, Marion, tries to seduce Bill.

After leaving Marion's, Bill meets a prostitute named Domino. When Alice calls, Bill backs out but pays Domino after kissing her. He then meets Nick at a jazz club. Nick describes a masked orgy in a mansion outside New York City, at which he will play piano blindfolded, and gives Bill the password to enter the party. Bill goes to a costume store to buy an outfit for the orgy and offers the owner, Milich, money to rent a costume. He and Milich find Milich's teenage daughter engaged in sexual activity with two men. Milich locks the men in a room and threatens to call the police.

Bill goes to the mansion and gives the password, discovering a sexual ritual in progress. A masked woman warns him he is in danger. He is brought before the master of ceremonies, who demands to know a second password for the house, stating that the password Bill has is only to enter the grounds. Bill removes his mask at the demand of the master of ceremonies, but the woman who warned him insists on redeeming him, at a personal cost. Bill is warned to keep quiet.

Bill returns home feeling guilty and confused, only to find Alice laughing in her sleep. He wakes her up, and she tearfully tells him about a dream where she was having sex with the naval officer and many other men, and laughing at the idea of Bill watching. The next day, Bill goes to Nick's hotel, but the desk clerk tells him that Nick left with two dangerous-looking men. Bill returns the costume but realizes he has misplaced the mask and learns that Milich has accepted profiting from his daughter as a prostitute. Milich implies that Bill can pay to have sex with his daughter.

Consumed by thoughts of his wife's infidelity, Bill returns to the site of the orgy. At the front gate, he is handed an envelope with a warning to stay away. That evening, Bill tries calling Marion but hangs up when her fiancé answers. He goes to Domino's apartment to consummate their affair but is met by her roommate, Sally. Although there is sexual tension between them, Sally informs Bill that Domino has received news that she is HIV-positive.

After leaving the apartment, Bill is followed by a mysterious figure. He discovers from a newspaper article that an ex-beauty queen has died from an overdose and identifies her as Mandy. Ziegler summons him and admits to being a guest at the orgy. Ziegler reveals that there was no second password; failing to know this is what outed Bill as an outsider. Ziegler assures Bill that the secret society only aims to intimidate him into silence but implies that they are capable of taking action if necessary. Bill is concerned about Nick's disappearance and the death of Mandy, whom he identifies as the masked orgy participant who sacrificed herself for him. Ziegler claims Nick is back with his family in Seattle and that Mandy died from an accidental overdose due to drug addiction.

Bill returns home to find the mask on his pillow and confesses to Alice about the past two days. They go Christmas shopping with their daughter, and Bill apologizes to Alice. She suggests they do something "as soon as possible", to which Bill asks what she means. Alice simply responds with one word: "Fuck".

== Cast ==
- Tom Cruise as Dr. Bill Harford
- Nicole Kidman as Alice Harford
- Sydney Pollack as Victor Ziegler
- Marie Richardson as Marion Nathanson
- Rade Šerbedžija as Mr. Milich
- Todd Field as Nick Nightingale
- Vinessa Shaw as Domino
- Alan Cumming as Hotel Desk Clerk
- Sky du Mont as Sandor Szavost
- Fay Masterson as Sally
- Leelee Sobieski as Milich's Daughter
- Thomas Gibson as Carl Thomas
- Madison Eginton as Helena Harford
- Julienne Davis as Mandy Curran
- Gary Goba as Naval Officer
- Abigail Good as Mysterious Woman
  - Cate Blanchett as Mysterious Woman's Voice (uncredited)
- Leon Vitali as Red Cloak

== Production ==
=== Development ===
Eyes Wide Shut was developed after Stanley Kubrick read Arthur Schnitzler's Dream Story in 1968, when Kubrick was looking for a project to follow 2001: A Space Odyssey. Kubrick was interested in adapting the story, and with the help of journalist Jay Cocks, bought the filming rights to the novel. For the following decade, Kubrick considered making the Dream Story adaptation a sex comedy "with a wild and somber streak running through it", starring Steve Martin or Woody Allen in the main role. Kubrick also considered Tom Hanks, Bill Murray, Dustin Hoffman, Warren Beatty, Albert Brooks, Alan Alda, and Sam Shepard for the lead in the 1980s. The project was revived in 1994 when Kubrick hired Frederic Raphael to work on the script, updating the setting from early 20th-century Vienna to late 20th-century New York City. Kubrick invited his friend Michael Herr, who helped write Full Metal Jacket, to make revisions, but Herr declined for fear he would be underpaid and have to commit to a long production.

=== Adaptation ===
Kubrick adapted Eyes Wide Shut with co-writer Frederic Raphael from Arthur Schnitzler's 1926 novella Dream Story, which centers on a doctor, Fridolin, and his wife, Albertina, in Vienna. The novella is set during the Carnival, when people often wear masks to parties. The party that both husband and wife attend at the opening of the story is a Carnival masquerade ball, whereas the film's story begins at Christmas time.

For the film, Kubrick transposed the events to 1990s Greenwich Village in New York City, instead featuring an American doctor, Bill, and his wife, Alice. In an introduction to a Penguin Classics edition of Dream Story, Raphael wrote that, "Fridolin is not declared to be a Jew, but his feelings of cowardice, for failing to challenge his aggressor, echo the uneasiness of Austrian Jews in the face of Gentile provocation." Kubrick, who frequently removed references to Jewishness of characters in the novels he adapted, felt that the character of Bill should be a "Harrison Ford-ish goy" and created the surname of Harford as an allusion to the actor.

In the novella, the party (which is sparsely attended) requires "Denmark" as the password for entrance, paralleling Albertina's admitted infatuation with a Danish soldier, which she confides in Fridolin. In the film, the password used for the party entrance is "Fidelio." Film critic Jonathan Rosenbaum notes that both passwords echo elements of one member of the couple's behavior, though in opposite ways. In the novella, the woman who "redeems" Fridolin at the party, saving him from punishment for his infiltration of the event, is costumed as a nun, and most of the characters at the party are dressed as nuns or monks; Fridolin himself used a monk costume. This aspect was retained in the film's original screenplay, but was omitted in the filmed version.

The novella makes it clear that Fridolin at this point hates Albertina more than ever, thinking they are now lying together "like mortal enemies". It has been argued that the dramatic climax of the novella is actually Albertina's dream, and the film has shifted the focus to Bill's visit to the secret society's orgy, whose content is more shocking in the film.

The adaptation created a character with no counterpart in the novella: Ziegler, who represents both the elevated wealth and prestige to which Bill Harford aspires, and a connection between Bill's two worlds (his regular life, and the secret society organizing the ball). Critic Randy Rasmussen interprets Ziegler as representing Bill's worst self, much as in other Kubrick films; the title character in Dr. Strangelove represents the worst of the American national security establishment, Charles Grady represents the worst of Jack Torrance in The Shining, and Clare Quilty represents the worst of Humbert Humbert in Lolita.

More significantly, in the film, Ziegler gives a commentary on the whole story to Bill, including an explanation that the party incident, where Bill is apprehended, threatened, and ultimately redeemed by the woman's sacrifice, was staged. Whether this is to be believed or not, it is an exposition of Ziegler's view of the ways of the world as a member of the powerful elite.

=== Casting ===
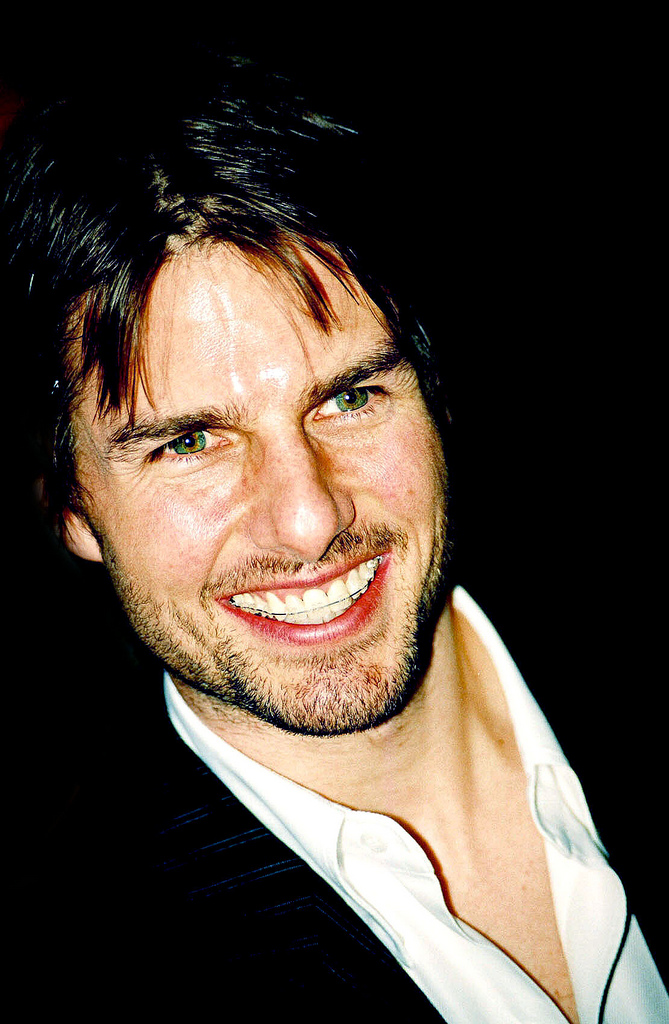
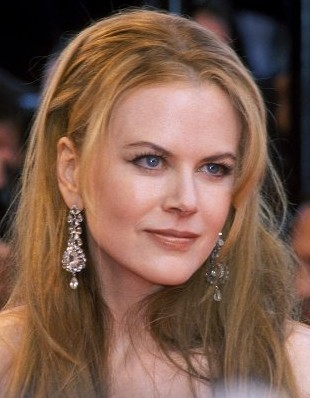
Tom Cruise and Nicole Kidman (pictured in 2000 and 2001), married at the time of production, portrayed the lead roles of Bill and Alice Harford

When Warner Bros. president Terry Semel approved production in 1995, he asked Kubrick to cast a movie star as "you haven't done that since Jack Nicholson [in The Shining]". Kubrick intended to cast a real married couple in the film as Bill and Alice Harford. Alec Baldwin and Kim Basinger were considered, as were Bruce Willis and Demi Moore. Kubrick eventually cast Tom Cruise in the role of Bill, having been impressed by his performance in Born on the Fourth of July (1989), and Nicole Kidman as Alice. Kidman had been in England filming The Portrait of a Lady (1996), and she and Cruise eventually decided to visit Kubrick at his estate in Childwickbury to discuss the project. After that meeting, Kubrick awarded them the roles. The couple's casting was officially announced by Variety on December 17, 1995. Kubrick also managed to make both not commit to other projects until Eyes Wide Shut was completed.

In a 2025 interview, John Turturro claimed Kubrick wrote the role of Nick Nightingale for him, but that Turturro accidentally turned it down due to a misunderstanding. Ultimately, Kubrick offered the role to Todd Field whose performance he had admired in Victor Nuñez’s Ruby in Paradise.

Jennifer Jason Leigh and Harvey Keitel each were cast in supporting roles and filmed by Kubrick, as Marion Nathanson and Victor Ziegler, respectively. Both ultimately dropped out of the production, reportedly due to scheduling conflicts. Keitel was first to depart the project to appear in Finding Graceland, followed by Leigh, who was shooting eXistenZ with David Cronenberg. Leigh was replaced by Marie Richardson, and Keitel by Sydney Pollack. Decades later, Keitel said that he had quit after feeling like Kubrick had "disrespected" him; Gary Oldman added that the breaking point was after Kubrick asked Keitel to do dozens of takes for a scene of his character walking through a doorway.

Among the other supporting cast, Alan Cumming later said that he auditioned six times for his small role in the film as a hotel clerk. Vinessa Shaw submitted an audition tape for the role of Domino, a prostitute encountered by Bill, and was cast by Kubrick. Shaw recalled, "twice I was called in and I was hired off of tape because Stanley Kubrick didn’t fly anywhere... I was hired off of this tape and that was it."

Julienne Davis was cast in the role of Mandy, a prostitute saved from a drug overdose by Bill at the Zieglers' Christmas party, whom he later finds has died and visits in the morgue. Kubrick originally offered Eva Herzigová this role, but she declined. It is implied that the character of Mandy and the mysterious masked woman Bill encounters at the orgy are the same person. However, while Davis does appear in the background as a masked participant during the orgy sequence, she was replaced by Abigail Good for the dialogue scenes with Cruise. and Good’s voice was later replaced by Cate Blanchett.

=== Filming ===
Principal photography of Eyes Wide Shut began on November 4, 1996. Originally, Kubrick planned for the shoot to last only three months, with a projected filming schedule lasting from October 28, 1996 to February 7, 1997. However, Kubrick's perfectionism led to script pages being rewritten on the set, and he intentionally filmed many scenes multiple times to try to break down the actors involved and have them give a more authentic performance. Numerous scenes, irrespective of their length, were filmed upward of 70 times. One scene of Cruise walking through a door was filmed 95 times. As a result, the shoot went on for much longer than expected. The actress Vinessa Shaw was initially contracted for two weeks and one scene but ended up working for two months. By Kidman's account, "Stanley didn’t work under the gun. Time was the most important thing to him. He was willing to give up location to save money, but he wasn’t willing to give up time." Filming took place exclusively at night, and the production was followed by a strong campaign of secrecy helped by Kubrick always working with a small team on set.

Due to the relentless nature of the production, the crew became exhausted and were reported to have been impacted by low morale. Cruise developed an ulcer but did not tell Kubrick. Filming was finally completed in June 1998, with the film's production budget having reached $65 million. The Guinness World Records recognized Eyes Wide Shut as the longest constant movie shoot that ran "...for over 15 months, a period that included an unbroken shoot of 46 weeks". The production was so long that Cruise and Kidman simultaneously delayed their works on Mission: Impossible 2 and Practical Magic.

Larry Smith, who had first served as a gaffer on both Barry Lyndon and The Shining, was chosen by Kubrick to be the film's cinematographer. Wherever possible, Smith made use of available light sources visible in the shots such as lamps and Christmas tree lights, but when this was insufficient he used Chinese paper lamps to softly brighten the scene, with other types of film lighting if needed. The color was enhanced by push processing the film reels (emulsion) which helped bring out the intensity of the color and emphasize highlights. This effect is evident in the Christmas party scene at Ziegler's house, with Smith noting that the push processing "made the lights appear to be much brighter than they were" and created a "wonderful warm glow."

Kubrick's perfectionism led him to oversee every visual element that would appear in a given frame, from props and furniture to the color of walls and other objects. One such element were the masks used in the orgy which were inspired by the masked carnival balls visited by the protagonists in the novel. Costume designer Marit Allen explained that Kubrick felt they fit in that scene for being part of the imaginary world and ended up "creat[ing] the impression of menace, but without exaggeration". As many masks as were used in the Venetian carnival were sent to London and Kubrick chose who would wear each piece. The paintings of Kubrick's wife Christiane and his stepdaughter Katharina are featured as decorations.

Kidman revealed that her explicit scenes with the naval officer, played by Gary Goba, were filmed over three days and that Kubrick wanted them to be "almost pornographic".

==== Locations ====
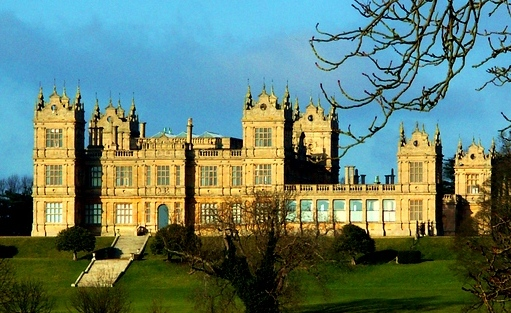
Mentmore Towers, one of the settings used by the film

Because of Kubrick's fear of flying, the entire film was shot in England, aside from some exterior footage filmed in New York City, which was rear projected behind Cruise during some of the street sequences. Sound-stage works were completed at London's Pinewood Studios which included a detailed recreation of Greenwich Village, as well as interiors of the Harfords' apartment. Kubrick's perfectionism went as far as sending production designers to Manhattan to measure street widths and note newspaper vending machine locations.

Somerton, the palatial estate where the orgy sequence takes place, was an amalgam of different interior and exterior locations. Three separate estates were used for these scenes: Mentmore Towers in Buckinghamshire served as the exterior, while interior sequences were shot in Elveden Hall in Suffolk, and Highclere Castle in Hampshire.

Outdoor locations included Hatton Garden standing in for a Greenwich Village street, while Hamleys toy store in London was used as a stand-in for FAO Schwarz in the film's final scene. Additional photography occurred in the Chelsea and Westminster Hospital, as well as the Lanesborough Hotel, the latter of which served as the Nathansons' apartment. Actress Julienne Davis recalled that the morgue scene in which Cruise's character visits her corpse was shot inside a disused bacon factory in St Albans, Hertfordshire.

=== Post-production ===
After shooting was completed, Kubrick entered a prolonged post-production process. Editor Nigel Galt worked with Kubrick on the editing process using Avid Technology, and indicated he had begun editing the existing footage while the film was still in principal photography, beginning on December 30, 1996. The workload was so demanding that Galt requested assistant editors, after which Melanie Viner-Cuneo and Claus Wehlisch were hired, often working 12-hour days. By mid-February 1999, Galt noted that he was working up to 15 hours each day with Warner Bros.' impending March deadline.

While Kubrick typically screened the final cut of his films in England, he sent the first cut of the finished film to New York to accommodate Cruise and Kidman. On March 2, 1999, the first cut was screened for Cruise, Kidman, and Warner Bros. executives at the studio's Fifth Avenue headquarters. According to studio executive Semel: "[Stanley] felt really great about the film and I have to say we were really thrilled. It is an incredible picture." The film was well-received by Cruise, Kidman, and Semel. By Semel's account, only a few minor adjustments remained, consisting of titles and "a couple of color corrections, and some technical things."

On March 5, 1999, Kubrick held a second screening of the film for a British Warner Bros. representative at his home in Childwickbury. Kubrick died suddenly two days later of a heart attack. On March 13, 1999, the day after Kubrick's funeral, Galt resumed the post-production process with the assistance of Viner-Cuneo, Leon Vitali, Jan Harlan, and Kubrick's wife Christiane.

In 2019, it was revealed that Cate Blanchett had provided the voice of the mysterious masked woman at the orgy party because actress Abigail Good was unable to speak with a convincing American accent. Cruise and Kidman ended up suggesting Blanchett for the dubbing, which occurred after Kubrick's death.

== Music ==
Jocelyn Pook wrote the original music for Eyes Wide Shut, but, like other Kubrick movies, the film was noted for its use of classical music. The opening title music is Shostakovich's Waltz No. 2 from "Suite for Variety Stage Orchestra", misidentified as "Jazz Suite No. 2". One recurring piece is the second movement of György Ligeti's piano cycle "Musica ricercata". Kubrick originally intended to feature "Im Treibhaus" from Wagner's Wesendonck Lieder, but the director eventually replaced it with Ligeti's piece feeling Wagner's song was "too beautiful". In the morgue scene, Franz Liszt's late solo piano piece, "Nuages Gris" ("Grey Clouds") (1881), is heard. "Rex tremendae" from Mozart's Requiem plays as Bill walks into the café and reads of Mandy's death.

Pook was hired after choreographer Yolande Snaith rehearsed the masked ball orgy scene using Pook's composition "Backwards Priests" – which features a Romanian Orthodox Divine Liturgy recorded in a church in Baia Mare, played backwards – as a reference track. Kubrick then called the composer and asked if she had anything else "weird" like that song. "Backwards Priests" was reworked for the final cut of the scene, with the title "Masked Ball". Pook ended up composing and recording four pieces of music, many times based on her previous work, totaling 24 minutes. The composer's work ended up having mostly string instruments – including a viola played by Pook herself – with no brass or woodwinds as Pook "just couldn't justify these other textures", particularly as she wanted the tracks played on dialogue-heavy scenes to be "subliminal" and felt such instruments would be intrusive.

Another track in the orgy, "Migrations", features a Tamil song sung by Manickam Yogeswaran, a Carnatic singer. The original cut featured a scriptural recitation from the Bhagavad Gita, which Pook took from a previous Yogeswaran recording. South African Hindu Mahasabha, a Hindu group, protested against the scripture being used, Warner Bros. issued a public apology, and hired the singer to record a similar track to replace the chant.

The party at Ziegler's house features rearrangements of love songs such as "When I Fall in Love" and "It Had to Be You", used in increasingly ironic ways considering how Alice and Bill flirt with other people in the scene. As Kidman was nervous about doing nude scenes, Kubrick stated she could bring her own music for the filming. When Kidman brought a Chris Isaak CD, Kubrick approved it, and incorporated Isaak's song "Baby Did a Bad, Bad Thing" to both an early romantic embrace of Bill and Alice and the film's trailer.

== Release ==
=== Marketing ===
Original poster art concepts designed by Katharina Kubrick featuring the motif of Venetian masks. These designs were ultimately rejected by Warner Bros.

When Warner Bros. announced the project in 1995, it merely stated that Kubrick was making "a story of sexual jealousy and obsession starring Tom Cruise and Nicole Kidman." Officially, no one added anything substantive to that press release in the years since–which is why the rumor that Cruise and Kidman played psychiatrists drawn into a web of sexual intrigue with their patients started, as did the one about Kubrick making an NC-17-rated blue movie, and the one that Cruise wore a dress in one sequence. Warner Bros. heavily promoted Eyes Wide Shut, while following Kubrick's secrecy campaign—to the point that the film's press kits contained no production notes, not even the director's suggestions to Semel regarding the marketing campaign, given one week prior to Kubrick's death. The first footage was shown to theater owners attending the 1999 ShoWest convention in Las Vegas, consisting of a teaser trailer in which Cruise and Kidman's characters caress one another in front of a mirror. Television spots featured both Isaak and Ligeti's music from the soundtrack, while revealing little about the film's plot. The film also appeared on the cover of Time magazine, and on show-business programs, including Entertainment Tonight and Access Hollywood.

Kubrick's stepdaughter Katharina and wife Christiane designed several posters for the film using the motif of Venetian masks modeled after Cruise and Kidman. Commenting on the designs, Katharina said: "My mother and I are both artists, and because masks are very heavily featured in the film—we started with the premise of turning Tom and Nicole’s faces into masks. We got a photographer who shot them for us full-face. Then using Photoshop we made Nicole and Tom look as mask-like as possible." These designs were ultimately rejected by Warner Bros. because they felt the images obscured the faces of the film's two stars. After the rejection, Katharina and Christiane created a new design which was ultimately approved by the studio; the final official one-sheet features a still image of Cruise and Kidman kissing, framed within a mirror that was used as a prop in the Harfords' apartment. "We had [the mirror] photographed, and then we took that photograph of them in front of the mirror and made, again, what we thought was an elegant poster," Katharina said. "It’s a shame the originals weren’t used because if you look at them now, 20 years later, I think they really hold up and they are definitely Tom and Nicole." One of the original designs was later used as the cover artwork for the 4K UHD Blu-ray disc release of the film by The Criterion Collection in 2025.

=== Studio censorship and classification ===
Citing contractual obligations to deliver an R rating, Warner Bros. digitally altered the orgy for the film's American release by blocking out graphic sexuality using additional figures to obscure the view in order to avoid an adults-only NC-17 rating that would have limited its financial viability. Cinematographer Larry Smith commented on the censorship:

The only issues that occurred were with the MPAA when we were trying to get the rating. We went off down a path I didn’t agree with because they got obsessed about the nudity. They were so mundane and ridiculous about it. They had me make changes, and I had to do them because I was told to... We had five screenings with the MPAA, and every time they kept trying to get us to take more out. And then it became clear that this was not going to happen. Who are they to tell the world what they see in a Stanley Kubrick movie? The premise was, as far as Warners was concerned, they only wanted one release of the film.

This alteration angered both film critics and fans, who argued that Kubrick had never been shy about ratings (A Clockwork Orange was originally given an X rating). Roger Ebert heavily criticized the technique of using digital images to mask the action, writing that it "should not have been done at all" and it is "symbolic of the moral hypocrisy of the rating system that it would force a great director to compromise his vision, while by the same process making his adult film more accessible to young viewers." Although Ebert has been frequently cited as calling the standard North American R-rated version the "Austin Powers" version of Eyes Wide Shut – referring to two scenes in Austin Powers: International Man of Mystery in which, through camera angles and coincidences, full frontal nudity is blocked from view in a comical way – his review stated that this joke referred to an early rough draft of the altered scene, never publicly released.

=== Theatrical run ===
Eyes Wide Shut had its world premiere at the Westwood Village Theatre in Los Angeles on July 13, 1999. The film subsequently opened nationwide on July 16, 1999.

The film was exhibited at the Venice Film Festival on September 1, 1999, followed by a screening in Paris on September 2, 1999; stars Cruise and Kidman were in attendance at both events. The film's British premiere occurred on September 3, 1999, at the Warner Village cinema in Leicester Square.

=== Home media ===
Eyes Wide Shut was first released on VHS and DVD on March 7, 2000 by Warner Bros. Home Entertainment. A reissue under the studio's "Stanley Kubrick Collection" was released in 2001. Both editions are presented in 4:3 full frame aspect ratio, and feature the censored R-rated version of the film that was theatrically released in the United States.

On October 23, 2007, Warner Bros. Home Entertainment re-released the film in its original uncensored cut on DVD, as well as in HD DVD and Blu-ray disc formats. This marked the first home video release that presents the film in anamorphic 1.78:1 (16:9) format (the film was shown theatrically as soft matted 1.66:1 in Europe and 1.85:1 in the US and Japan); it is also the first American home video release to feature the uncensored version. While the packaging for these releases indicate that both the R-rated and uncensored cuts are included on the discs, this is a misprint, as only the uncensored version is present.

The Criterion Collection released the film on 4K UHD and Blu-ray on November 25, 2025, featuring the uncensored cut in a new master scanned from the original 35 mm camera negatives.

This release is included alongside Kubrick's entire filmography as part of the Criterion Collection 4K UHD Blu-ray box set titled The Complete Kubrick, which was released in October 2026.

== Reception ==
=== Box office ===
The film topped the week-end box office for its U.S. opening, earning $21.7 million from 2,411 screens. These numbers surpassed the studio's expectations of $20 million, and became both Cruise's sixth consecutive chart topper and Kubrick's highest opening week-end as well as the highest featuring Kidman and Cruise together. Eyes Wide Shut ended up grossing a total of $55,691,208 in the US. The numbers put it as Kubrick's second-highest-grossing film in the country, behind 2001: A Space Odyssey, but both were considered box office disappointments.

In the United Kingdom, it also topped the box-office charts during its opening, earning £1,189,672.

Overseas earnings of over $105 million led to a $162,091,208 box office run world-wide, turning it into the highest-grossing film directed by Kubrick.

=== Critical response ===
Eyes Wide Shut received generally positive reviews from critics. On Rotten Tomatoes, the film holds an approval rating of 79% based on 228 reviews, with an average rating of 7.8/10. The website's critical consensus reads, "Kubrick's intense study of the human psyche yields an impressive cinematic work." Metacritic gives the film a weighted average score of 69 out of 100 based on 34 reviews, indicating "generally favorable" reviews. Over fifty critics listed the film among the best of 1999. French magazine Cahiers du Cinéma named it the best film of the year in its annual "top-ten" list. However, audiences polled by CinemaScore gave the film an average grade of "D−" on an A+ to F scale.

In the Chicago Tribune, Michael Wilmington declared the film a masterpiece, lauding it as "provocatively conceived, gorgeously shot and masterfully executed ... Kubrick's brilliantly choreographed one-take scenes create a near-hypnotic atmosphere of commingled desire and dread." Nathan Rabin of The A.V. Club was also highly positive, arguing that "the film's primal, almost religious intensity and power is primarily derived from its multifaceted realization that disobeying the dictates of society and your conscience can be both terrifying and exhilarating. ... The film's depiction of sexual depravity and amorality could easily venture into the realm of camp in the hands of a lesser filmmaker, but Kubrick depicts primal evil in a way that somehow makes it seem both new and deeply terrifying."

Roger Ebert of the Chicago Sun-Times gave the film a score of three and a half stars out of four, writing, "Kubrick's great achievement in the film is to find and hold an odd, unsettling, sometimes erotic tone for the doctor's strange encounters." He praised the individual dream-like atmosphere of the separate scenes, and called the choice of Christmas-themed lighting "garish, like an urban sideshow".

Reviewer James Berardinelli stated that it was arguably one of Kubrick's best films. Along with considering Kidman "consistently excellent", he wrote that Kubrick "has something to say about the causes and effects of depersonalized sex", and praised the work as "thought-provoking and unsettling". Writing for The New York Times, reviewer Janet Maslin commented, "This is a dead-serious film about sexual yearnings, one that flirts with ridicule yet sustains its fundamental eeriness and gravity throughout. The dreamlike intensity of previous Kubrick visions is in full force here."

Some reviewers gave the film unfavorable assessments. One complaint was that the film's pacing was too slow; while this may have been intended to convey a dream state, critics objected that it made actions and decisions seem laboured. Another complaint was that it did not live up to the expectation of it being a "sexy film" which is what it had been marketed as, thus defying audiences' expectations. Many critics, such as Manohla Dargis of LA Weekly, found the prolific orgy scene to be "banal" and "surprisingly tame". While Kubrick's "pictorial talents" were described as "striking" by Rod Dreher of The New York Post, the pivotal scene was deemed by Stephen Hunter, writing for The Washington Post, as the "dullest orgy [he'd] ever seen". Hunter elaborates on his criticism, and states that "Kubrick is annoyingly offhand while at the same time grindingly pedantic; plot points are made over and over again, things are explained till the dawn threatens to break in the east, and the movie stumbles along at a glacial pace". Owen Gleiberman of Entertainment Weekly complained about the inauthenticity of the New York setting, claiming that the soundstage used for the film's production did not have "enough bustle" to capture the reality of the city. Paul Tatara of CNN described the film as a "slow-motion morality tale full of hot female bodies and thoroughly uneventful 'mystery'", while Andrew Sarris writing for The New York Observer criticized the film's "feeble attempts at melodramatic tension and suspense". David Edelstein of Slate dismissed it as "estranged from any period I recognize. Who are these people played by Cruise and Kidman, who act as if no one has ever made a pass at them and are so deeply traumatized by their newfound knowledge of sexual fantasies—the kind that mainstream culture absorbed at least half a century ago? Who are these aristocrats whose limos take them to secret masked orgies in Long Island mansions? Even dream plays need some grounding in the real world." J. Hoberman wrote that the film "feels like a rough draft at best."

Lee Siegel from Harper's felt that most critics responded mainly to the marketing campaign and did not address the film on its own terms. Others felt that American censorship took an esoteric film and made it even more difficult to understand. In his article "Grotesque Caricature", published in Postmodern Culture, Stefan Mattesich praises the film's nuanced caricatured elements, and states that the film's negation of conventional narrative elements is what resulted in its subsequent negative reception.

For the introduction to Michel Ciment's Kubrick: The Definitive Edition, Martin Scorsese wrote: "When Eyes Wide Shut came out a few months after Stanley Kubrick's death in 1999, it was severely misunderstood, which came as no surprise. If you go back and look at the contemporary reactions to any Kubrick picture (except the earliest ones), you'll see that all his films were initially misunderstood. Then, after five or ten years came the realization that 2001 or Barry Lyndon or The Shining was like nothing else before or since."

In 2012, Slant Magazine ranked the film as the second greatest of the 1990s. The British Film Institute ranked the film at No. 19 on its list of "90 great films of the 1990s". In 2022, IndieWire named the film the best movie of the 1990s. The film was listed at number 61 in the BBC's list of the 100 greatest American films of all time.

=== Accolades ===
Award/association	Year	Category	Recipient(s) and nominee(s)	Result	Ref.
Blockbuster Entertainment Awards	2000	Favorite Actress – Drama/Romance	Nicole Kidman	Won	
Blockbuster Entertainment Awards	2000	Favorite Actor – Drama/Romance	Tom Cruise	Nominated	
Blockbuster Entertainment Awards	2000	Favorite Supporting Actor – Drama/Romance	Sydney Pollack	Nominated	
Bodil Awards	1999	Best American Film	Eyes Wide Shut	Nominated	
Cahiers du Cinéma	1999	Best Film – Top Ten	Eyes Wide Shut	1st place	
Cahiers du Cinéma	2000	Best Film of the 1990s	Eyes Wide Shut	4th place (Note: Tied with Close-Up, Twin Peaks, and Unforgiven.)	
César Awards	2000	Best Foreign Film	Stanley Kubrick	Nominated	
Chicago Film Critics Association	1999	Best Director	Stanley Kubrick	Nominated	
Chicago Film Critics Association	1999	Best Cinematography	Larry Smith; Stanley Kubrick	Nominated	
Chicago Film Critics Association	1999	Best Original score	Jocelyn Pook	Nominated	
Costume Designers Guild	1999	Excellence in Costume Design for Film – Contemporary	Marit Allen	Nominated	
Csapnivalo Awards	1999	Best Art Film	Eyes Wide Shut	Won	
Empire Awards	2000	Best Actress	Nicole Kidman	Nominated	
French Syndicate of Cinema Critics	1999	Best Foreign Film	Stanley Kubrick	Won	
Golden Globe Awards	1999	Best Original Score	Jocelyn Pook	Nominated	
Online Film Critics Society	2000	Best Original Score	Jocelyn Pook	Nominated	
Online Film Critics Society	2000	Best Cinematography	Larry Smith	Nominated	
Online Film Critics Society	2000	Best Director	Stanley Kubrick	Nominated	
Online Film & Television Association	2000	Best Director	Stanley Kubrick	Nominated	
Online Film & Television Association	2000	Best Actress	Nicole Kidman	Nominated	
Online Film & Television Association	2000	Best Writing – Adaptation	Stanley Kubrick; Frederic Raphael	Nominated	
Online Film & Television Association	2000	Best Music – Adapted Song (Note: For the track "Baby Did a Bad, Bad Thing".)	Chris Isaak	Nominated	
Online Film & Television Association	2000	Best Production Design	Leslie Tomkins; Roy Walker; John Fenner; Kevin Phipps; Marit Allen	Nominated	
Online Film & Television Association	2000	Best Cinematic Moment (Note: For the film's orgy sequence.)	Eyes Wide Shut	Nominated	
Online Film & Television Association	2000	Best Cinematography	Larry Smith; Stanley Kubrick	Nominated	
Online Film & Television Association	2021	Film Hall of Fame	Eyes Wide Shut	Honored	
Satellite Awards	2000	Best Actress – Drama	Nicole Kidman	Nominated	
Satellite Awards	2000	Best Cinematography	Larry Smith	Nominated	
Satellite Awards	2000	Best Sound	Paul Conway and Edward Tise	Nominated	
Saturn Awards	2008	Best DVD Collection	Stanley Kubrick: Warner Home Video Directors Series (Note: Shared with four other films: 2001: A Space Odyssey, A Clockwork Orange, The Shining, and Full Metal Jacket.)	Nominated	
Saturn Awards	2012	Best DVD Collection	Stanley Kubrick: The Essential Collection (Note: Shared with nine other films: Full Metal Jacket, The Shining, 2001: A Space Odyssey, Lolita, Stanley Kubrick: A Life in Pictures, Spartacus, A Clockwork Orange, Barry Lyndon, and Dr. Strangelove.)	Won	
Saturn Awards	2015	Best DVD/Blu-ray Collection	Stanley Kubrick: The Masterpiece Collection (Note: Shared with seven other films: Lolita, Dr. Strangelove, 2001: A Space Odyssey, A Clockwork Orange, Barry Lyndon, The Shining, and Full Metal Jacket.)	Nominated	
Stinkers Bad Movie Awards	2000	Most Intrusive Musical Score	Jocelyn Pook	Nominated	
Venice Film Festival	1999	FilmCritica Bastone Bianco Award	Stanley Kubrick	Won	

== Themes and interpretations ==
=== Genre ===
Eyes Wide Shut was described by some reviewers, and partially marketed, as an erotic thriller, a categorization disputed by others. It is classified as an erotic thriller in the book The Erotic Thriller in Contemporary Cinema, by Linda Ruth Williams, and was described as such in news articles about Cruise and Kidman's lawsuit over assertions that they saw a sex therapist during filming. Jeffrey M. Anderson, writing for Combustible Celluloid, describes it as an erotic thriller upon first viewing, but actually a "complex story about marriage and sexuality". Kubrick's wife, Christiane, disputed the film's association with the erotic thriller genre, stating that it "has nothing to do with sex and everything to do with fear." In an essay published in Stanley Kubrick: Essays on His Films and Legacy (2015), academic Lindiwe Dovey commented that the film's marketing as an erotic thriller was misleading: "Audiences who were expecting an erotic thriller from the film were sorely disappointed; they received, instead, a kind of horror thriller."

Writing in TV Guide, Maitland McDonagh writes: "No one familiar with the cold precision of Kubrick's work will be surprised that this isn't the steamy erotic thriller a synopsis (or the ads) might suggest." Writing in general about the erotic thriller genre for CineAction in 2001, Douglas Keesey states that "whatever [Eyes Wide Shut's] actual type, [it] was at least marketed as an erotic thriller".

Michael Koresky, writing in the 2006 issue of film journal Reverse Shot, notes "this director, who defies expectations at every turn and brings genre to his feet, was ...setting out to make neither the 'erotic thriller' that the press maintained nor an easily identifiable 'Kubrick film'". In a 2019 retrospective for Consequence of Sound, Joe Lipsett echoed this sentiment, stating that the film "is not erotic, sexy, or even titillating. This is because the film is not actually about sex at all; it’s the journey of self-realization of a close-minded narcissist who discovers, after a revelation from his wife, that the world is actually a highly sexualized place."

=== Christmas setting ===
In addition to relocating the story from Vienna in the 1900s to New York City in the 1990s, Kubrick changed the time-frame of Schnitzler's story from Mardi Gras to Christmas. Michael Koresky believed Kubrick did this because of the rejuvenating symbolism of Christmas. Mario Falsetto, on the other hand, notes that Christmas lights allow Kubrick to employ some of his distinct methods of shooting including using source location lighting, as he also did in Barry Lyndon. Janet Maslin of The New York Times notes that the film "gives an otherworldly radiance and personality to Christmas lights", and critic Randy Rasmussen notes that "colorful Christmas lights ... illuminate almost every location in the film." Harper's film critic, Lee Siegel, believes that the film's recurring motif is the Christmas tree, because it symbolizes the way that "Compared with the everyday reality of sex and emotion, our fantasies of gratification are ... pompous and solemn in the extreme ... For desire is like Christmas: it always promises more than it delivers." Author Tim Kreider notes that the "Satanic" mansion-party at Somerton is the only set in the film without a Christmas tree, stating that "Almost every set is suffused with the dreamlike, hazy glow of colored lights and tinsel." Furthermore, he argues that "Eyes Wide Shut, though it was released in summer, was the Christmas movie of 1999." Noting that Kubrick has shown viewers the dark side of Christmas consumerism, Louise Kaplan states that the film illustrates ways in which the "material reality of money" is shown replacing the spiritual values of Christmas, charity, and compassion. While virtually every scene has a Christmas tree, there is "no Christmas music or cheery Christmas spirit."

Critic Alonso Duralde, in his book Have Yourself a Movie Little Christmas, categorized the film as a "Christmas movie for grownups", arguing that "Christmas weaves its way through the film from start to finish".

=== Use of Venetian masks ===
Historians, travel guide authors, and merchants of Venetian masks have noted that these have a long history of being worn during promiscuous activities. Authors Tim Kreider and Thomas Nelson have linked the film's usage of these to Venice's reputation as a center of both eroticism and mercantilism. Nelson notes that the sex ritual combines elements of Venetian Carnival and Catholic rites, in particular, the character of "Red Cloak" who simultaneously serves as Grand Inquisitor and King of Carnival. As such, Nelson argues that the sex ritual is a symbolic mirror of the darker truth behind the façade of Victor Ziegler's earlier Christmas party. Carolin Ruwe, in her book Symbols in Stanley Kubrick's Movie 'Eyes Wide Shut', argues that the mask is the prime symbol of the film. Its symbolic meaning is represented through its connection to the characters in the film; as Tim Kreider points out, this can be seen through the masks in the prostitute's apartment and her being renamed as "Domino" in the film, which is a type of Venetian Mask. Writing in Discovering Kubrick's Symbolism: The Secrets of the Films (2020), Nicole M. Berg notes the film's prominent use of Venetian masks, describing many of the masks as "classic Venetian masks" marked with "centuries-old Luciferian styles." Berg also cites numerous general references to historic Italian culture present throughout the film.

=== Social class and secret societies ===
Scholar Arthur Versluis notes that Eyes Wide Shut represents a "political gnosis," which he describes as a "revelation that behind wealth and opulence of an American social elite is initiation into a corrupted and corrupting secret society or network." He also observes that the film incorporates representations of human trafficking through its depiction of young women used for sexual exploitation by the wealthy and elite. Versluis notes that these themes have contributed to theories and interpretations that the film reveals covert activities among secret societies, adding: "Eyes Wide Shut is a reference point for the revelation that behind the appearance of high society, celebrity, wealth, and political power is corruption variously labeled as Satanic, Luciferian, Illuminati, or demonic." Versluis believes the film's title plays on the notion of "seeing what is in front of us (eyes wide open) and yet not seeing."

Rich Cohen, writing in 2020 for The Paris Review, echoes this sentiment: "Kubrick’s message is simple: you know nothing. It’s a truth demonstrated via allegory, the story of a powerful man beset by demons. Of course, to many, the movie was always more than a parable. It was an exposé written in code. It revealed a dynamic that had long played out in sectors of elite society but was not glimpsed until our own age, an age of scandal, the most telling being the scandal of Jeffrey Epstein." Film critic Peter Bradshaw interprets this theme as analogous to the marital discontent between the Harfords: "the socio-sexual aspect of this civilised couple's discontents: the sense of how close sexual rejection is to social exclusion, and the sense that high society is like a thrillingly decadent party to which one is not invited."

The film's central orgy party sequence has drawn parallels from some critics and viewers to the Surrealist Ball of 1972 held by Marie-Hélène and Guy de Rothschild. This discourse was amplified due to the fact that part of the film was shot at Mentmore Towers, an estate once owned by the Rothschild family. In his book Jewish Space Lasers: The Rothschilds and 200 Years of Conspiracy Theories (2023), Mike Rothschild suggests that this parallel is unfounded, as the event was not an orgy, nor is there evidence that Kubrick or his co-writer Frederic Raphael knew anything about it at the time the film was made (photographs of the ball were not made public until the 2010s). "Whatever occult or secret connection exists between the Rothschilds and Eyes Wide Shut... exists in the minds of believers, and nowhere else... whenever Western pop culture needs a wealthy and secretive family to be running some kind of hidden puppet-master routine, the Rothschilds are available."

=== Artwork in the film ===
Paintings and sculptures appear throughout the film, some historical and others painted by Kubrick's wife Christiane Kubrick and stepdaughter Katharina Kubrick Hobbs. The home of the Harfords contains the majority of the works painted by Kubrick's family members, with the exception being a painting of a nude reclining pregnant woman by Christiane Kubrick titled Paula On Red that appears in Ziegler's bathroom during the overdose scene. In the beginning of the film, as Bill and Alice are saying goodbye to their daughter Helena and the babysitter, a painting by Christiane Kubrick titled "View from the Mentmore" can be seen hanging next to the Christmas tree, a reference to Mentmore Towers where part of the film's orgy sequence was shot.

During Ziegler's party, Bill is summoned to the bathroom to deal with an apparent overdose, as he climbs the spiral staircase he passes Giulio Bergonzoli's sculpture Gli amori degli angeli (The Loves of Angels) which is at the foot of the staircase. This sculpture is said to be inspired by a poem titled The Loves of the Angels by 19th-century poet Thomas Moore; the poem itself describes the story of three angels who fall in love with mortal women and share the password to heaven with them resulting in their banishment. At the time of the poem's release, it was received with controversy due to the open eroticism throughout. During the same party sequence, Bill is talking with the two models as they walk past a small reproduction of Gian Lorenzo Bernini's sculpture Apollo and Daphne sitting on a table.

When Bill enters a cafe towards the end of the film, two Pre-Raphaelite paintings can be seen hanging on parallel walls, Ophelia by John William Waterhouse and Astarte Syriaca by Dante Gabriel Rossetti. Waterhouse's Ophelia depicts the character by the same name in Shakespeare's tragedy Hamlet moments before her death. Astarte Syriaca depicts Astarte, the ancient Syrian goddess of love, as well as two symmetrical angels holding torches directly behind her. Both paintings mirror events within the film. In the same cafe scene, a crystoleum print of Maude Goodman's Hush! (or, A Moment of Idleness) is seen behind Bill as he sits down with a newspaper.

When Bill is walking through a hospital hallway towards the end of the film, he walks past Jann Haworth's painting Aunt Gurdi Burning (1995). The painting is in the permanent collection of the Chelsea and Westminster Hospital where the scenes were filmed.

== Finished version ==
=== Kubrick's vision ===
Though Warner Bros. insisted that Kubrick had turned in his final cut before his death, the film was still in the final stages of post-production, which was therefore completed by the studio in collaboration with Kubrick's estate. This spurred debate from journalists and audiences about whether the work that remained was minor and exclusively technical in nature, allowing the estate to faithfully complete the film based on the director's notes. However, decisions regarding sound mixing, scoring and color-correction would have necessarily been made without Kubrick's input. Furthermore, Kubrick had a history of continuing to edit his films up until the last minute, and in some cases even after initial public screenings, as had been the case with 2001: A Space Odyssey and The Shining.

Writing for Vanity Fair, Kubrick collaborator Michael Herr recalled a phone call from the director regarding the cut that would be screened for the Warner Bros. executives four days before his death:

...there was looping to be done and the music wasn't finished, lots of small technical fixes on color and sound; would I show work that wasn't finished? He had to show it to Tom and Nicole because they had to sign nudity releases, and to Terry Semel and Bob Daly of Warner Bros., but he hated it that he had to, and I could hear it in his voice that he did.

Garrett Brown, inventor of the Steadicam, has expressed that he considers Eyes Wide Shut to be an unfinished film:

I think Eyes Wide Shut was snatched up by the studio when Stanley died and they just grabbed the highest number Avid edit and ran off as if that was the movie. But it was three months before the movie was due to be released. I don't think there's a chance that was the movie he had in mind, or the music track and a lot of other things. It's a great shame because you know it's out there, but it doesn't feel to me as it's really his film.

Nicole Kidman, one of the stars of the film, briefly wrote about the completion of the film and the release of the film being at the same time as John F. Kennedy Jr.'s death from her perspective:

There was a lot of interest in Eyes Wide Shut before it was released. But the weekend it came out, July 16, 1999, was the death of JFK Jr., his wife and her sister—a black, black weekend. And for Stanley to have died [on March 7, 1999, at age 70] before the film opened... Well, it all felt so dark and strange. Stanley had sent over the cut he considered done to us, Tom and I watched it in New York—and then he died.

In 2025, editor Nigel Galt spoke on the film as a complete work fitting Kubrick's intent:

I can tell you that nothing in the film that happened—and this includes after his death—involved anything that Stanley wasn’t aware of, or wasn’t aware that was going to happen. The difficulty that happened with Stanley’s sudden demise—and this was, remember, three days after I showed the film in New York: shown it to Terry Semel and Bob Daly at Warners and then, same night, showed it to Tom and Nicole—when I got back to London, Stanley was jubilant with the reaction. And we had a long, long-ish conversation, and the only thing that had to be done was mundane editing stuff. We had establishing shots to put in the film—you know, exterior buildings—and that was it. There was nothing missing. That cut is Stanley’s cut the day he died. And nothing was over-edited. There was no Illuminati.

=== Opinions ===
Jan Harlan, Kubrick's brother-in-law and executive producer, reported that Kubrick was "very happy" with the film and considered it to be his "greatest contribution to the art of cinema".

R. Lee Ermey, an actor in Kubrick's film Full Metal Jacket, stated that Kubrick phoned him two weeks before his death to express his despondency over Eyes Wide Shut. "He told me it was a piece of shit", Ermey said in Radar magazine, "and that he was disgusted with it and that the critics were going to 'have him for lunch'. He said Cruise and Kidman had their way with him—exactly the words he used."

According to Todd Field, Kubrick's friend and an actor in Eyes Wide Shut, Ermey's claims do not accurately reflect Kubrick's essential attitude. Field's response appeared in an October 18, 2006, interview with Grouch Reviews:

The polite thing would be to say 'No comment'. But the truth is that ...let's put it this way, you've never seen two actors more completely subservient and prostrate themselves at the feet of a director. Stanley was absolutely thrilled with the film. He was still working on the film when he died. And he probably died because he finally relaxed. It was one of the happiest weekends of his life, right before he died, after he had shown the first cut to Terry, Tom and Nicole. He would have kept working on it, like he did on all of his films. But I know that from people around him personally, my partner who was his assistant for thirty years. And I thought about R. Lee Ermey for In the Bedroom. And I talked to Stanley a lot about that film, and all I can say is Stanley was adamant that I shouldn't work with him for all kinds of reasons that I won't get into because there is no reason to do that to anyone, even if they are saying slanderous things that I know are completely untrue.

== Bibliography ==
- Adams, Mark (2004). Location London. London, England: New Holland. ISBN 978-1-84330-478-4.
- Arnold, Ben, ed. (2002). The Liszt Companion. Westport, Connecticut: Greenwood Publishing Group. ISBN 978-0-313-30689-1.
- Berg, Nicole M. (2020). Discovering Kubrick's Symbolism: The Secrets of the Films. Jefferson, North Carolina: McFarland & Company. ISBN 978-1-476-63992-5.
- Chion, Michel (2002). Eyes Wide Shut. London, England: BFI Publishing. ISBN 978-0-85170-932-1.
- Ciment, Michel (2003). Kubrick: The Definitive Edition. London, England: Faber & Faber. ISBN 978-0-571-21108-1.
- Cocks, Geoffrey (2004). The Wolf at the Door: Stanley Kubrick, History, & the Holocaust. New York City, New York: P. Lang. ISBN 978-0-8204-7115-0.
- Cocks, Geoffrey; Diedrick, James; Perusek, Glenn, eds. (2006). Depth of Field: Stanley Kubrick, Film, and the Uses of History. Madison, Wisconsin: University of Wisconsin Press. ISBN 978-0-299-21614-6.
  - Kreider, Tim. "Introducing Sociology". In Cocks, Diedrick & Perusek (2006), pp. 280–297.
  - Loewenberg, Peter. "Freud, Schnitzler, and Eyes Wide Shut". In Cocks, Diedrick & Perusek (2006), pp. 255–279.
  - Rosenbaum, Jonathan. "In Dreams Begin Responsibilities". In Cocks, Diedrick & Perusek (2006), pp. 245–254.
- Dovey, Lindiwe (2015). "Eyes Wide Shut: Kubrick and the Representation of Gender". In Rhodes, Gary D. (ed.). Stanley Kubrick: Essays on His Films and Legacy. Jefferson, North Carolina: McFarland & Company. pp. 170–181. ISBN 978-1-476-61050-4.
- Duralde, Alonso (2010). Have Yourself a Movie Little Christmas. New York City, New York: Limelight Editions. ISBN 978-0-87910-376-7.
- Falsetto, Mario (2001). Stanley Kubrick: A Narrative and Stylistic Analysis. Westport, Connecticut: Greenwood Publishing Group. ISBN 978-0-275-96974-5.
- Fenwick, James (2019). "Eyes Wide Shut". In Murguía, Salvador Jiménez; Dymond, Erica Joan; Fennelly, Kristina (eds.). The Encyclopedia of Sexism in American Films. New York City, New York: Bloomsbury. pp. 110–114. ISBN 979-8-881-87955-6.
- Guinness World Records 2001. Guinness World Records, Limited. 2000. ISBN 978-0-85112-102-4.
- Howard, James (1999). Stanley Kubrick Companion. London, England: Batsford. ISBN 978-0-713-48487-8.
- Kagan, Jeremy (2012). Directors Close Up 2: Interviews with Directors Nominated for Best Film by the Directors Guild of America: 2006–2012. Lanham, Maryland: Scarecrow Press. ISBN 978-0-8108-8391-8.
- Kaplan, Louise (2006). Cultures of Fetishism. New York City, New York: Macmillan. ISBN 978-1-4039-6968-2.
- Kolker, Robert P.; Abrams, Nathan (2019). Eyes Wide Shut: Stanley Kubrick and the Making of His Final Film. Oxford, England: Oxford University Press. ISBN 978-0-190-67805-0.
- Kubrick, Stanley (1999). Eyes Wide Shut: A Screenplay. New York City, New York: Warner Books. ISBN 978-0-446-67632-8.
- Mell, Eila (2015). Casting Might-Have-Beens: A Film by Film Directory of Actors Considered for Roles Given to Others. Jefferson, North Carolina: McFarland & Company. ISBN 978-1-476-60976-8.
- Nelson, Thomas Allen (2000). Kubrick: Inside a Film Artist's Maze. New and Expanded Edition. Bloomington, Indiana: Indiana University Press. ISBN 978-0-253-21390-7.
- Porter, Darwin; Prince, Danforth (2009). Frommer's Portable Venice. New York City, New York: Wiley. ISBN 978-0-470-39904-0.
- Powrie, Phil; Stilwell, Robynn Jeananne (2006). Changing Tunes: The Use of Pre-Existing Music in Film. Ashgate Publishing, Ltd. ISBN 978-0-7546-5137-6.
- Raphael, Frederic (2000). Eyes Wide Open. A Memoir of Stanley Kubrick and Eyes Wide Shut. London, England: Phoenix Publishing. ISBN 978-0-7538-0955-6.
- Reeves, Tony (2001). The Worldwide Guide to Movie Locations. Chicago, Illinois: Chicago Review Press. ISBN 978-1-55652-432-5.
- Rasmussen, Randy (2005). Stanley Kubrick: Seven Films Analyzed. Jefferson, North Carolina: McFarland & Company. ISBN 978-0-7864-2152-7.
- Ronson, Jon (2013). Lost at Sea: The Jon Ronson Mysteries. London, England: Picador. pp. 170, 174. ISBN 978-1-4472-6471-2.
- Rothschild, Mike (2023). Jewish Space Lasers: The Rothschilds and 200 Years of Conspiracy Theories. New York City, New York: Melville House Publishing. ISBN 978-1-685-89065-0.
- Ruwe, Carolin (2002). Symbols in Stanley Kubrick's Movie 'Eyes Wide Shut'. München, Germany: GRIN Verlag. ISBN 978-3-638-84176-4.
- Smedley, Edward (1837). Sketches from Venetian History. Vol. 2. New York City, New York: Harper. OCLC 80280646.
- Versluis, Arthur (2024). American Gnosis: Political Religion and Transcendence. Oxford, England: Oxford University Press. ISBN 978-0-197-65321-0.
- Williams, Linda Ruth (2005). The Erotic Thriller in Contemporary Cinema. Bloomington, Indiana: Indiana University Press. ISBN 978-0-253-34713-8.
- Wierzbicki, James (2012). Music, Sound and Filmmakers: Sonic Style in Cinema. New York City, New York: Routledge. ISBN 978-0-415-89894-2.
