= Frederic Raphael =

American-British writer (born 1931)

Frederic Raphael FRSL
- Born: Frederic Michael Raphael; 14 August 1931 (age 95); Chicago, Illinois, U.S.
- Education: St John's College, Cambridge
- Occupations: Novelist; Screenwriter; Journalist
- Years active: 1956–present
- Spouse: Sylvia Betty Glatt (m. 1955; died 2025)
- Children: 3, including Sarah Raphael
- Awards: Academy Award, BAFTA, Fellow of the Royal Society of Literature

Frederic Michael Raphael FRSL (born 14 August 1931) is an American-born British novelist, biographer, journalist and Oscar-winning screenwriter, known for writing the screenplays for Darling, Far from the Madding Crowd, Two for the Road, and Stanley Kubrick's last film Eyes Wide Shut. Raphael rose to prominence in the early 1960s with the publication of several acclaimed novels, but most notably with the release of the John Schlesinger film Darling, starring Julie Christie and Dirk Bogarde, a romantic drama set in Swinging London, for which he won the Academy Award for Best Original Screenplay in 1966. Two years later he was nominated again in the same category, this time for his work on Stanley Donen’s Two for the Road, starring Audrey Hepburn and Albert Finney. Since the death of screenwriter D. M. Marshman Jr. in 2015, he is the earliest surviving recipient of the Academy Award for Best Original Screenplay, and the sole surviving recipient of the now retired BAFTA category of Best British Screenplay.

In addition to his work in film and television, he has written over 20 novels, and a number of non-fiction books, including biographies of Lord Byron, W. Somerset Maugham and Flavius Josephus, as well as a memoir of his time working with Stanley Kubrick, entitled Eyes Wide Open.

== Early life and education ==
Raphael was born in 1931 in Chicago to an American Jewish mother from Chicago, Irene Rose (née Mauser), and a British Jewish father, Cedric Michael Raphael, an employee of the Shell Oil Company who had been transferred to the United States from Shell's London office. In 1938, when Raphael was seven, to his surprise the family moved to England and settled in Putney, London.

He was educated at Copthorne Preparatory School, Charterhouse School, and St John's College, Cambridge.

== Career ==
Raphael won an Oscar for the screenplay of the movie Darling (1965) and two years later received an Oscar nomination for his screenplay of Two for the Road. He also wrote the screenplay for the 1967 film adaptation of Thomas Hardy's Far From the Madding Crowd directed by John Schlesinger.

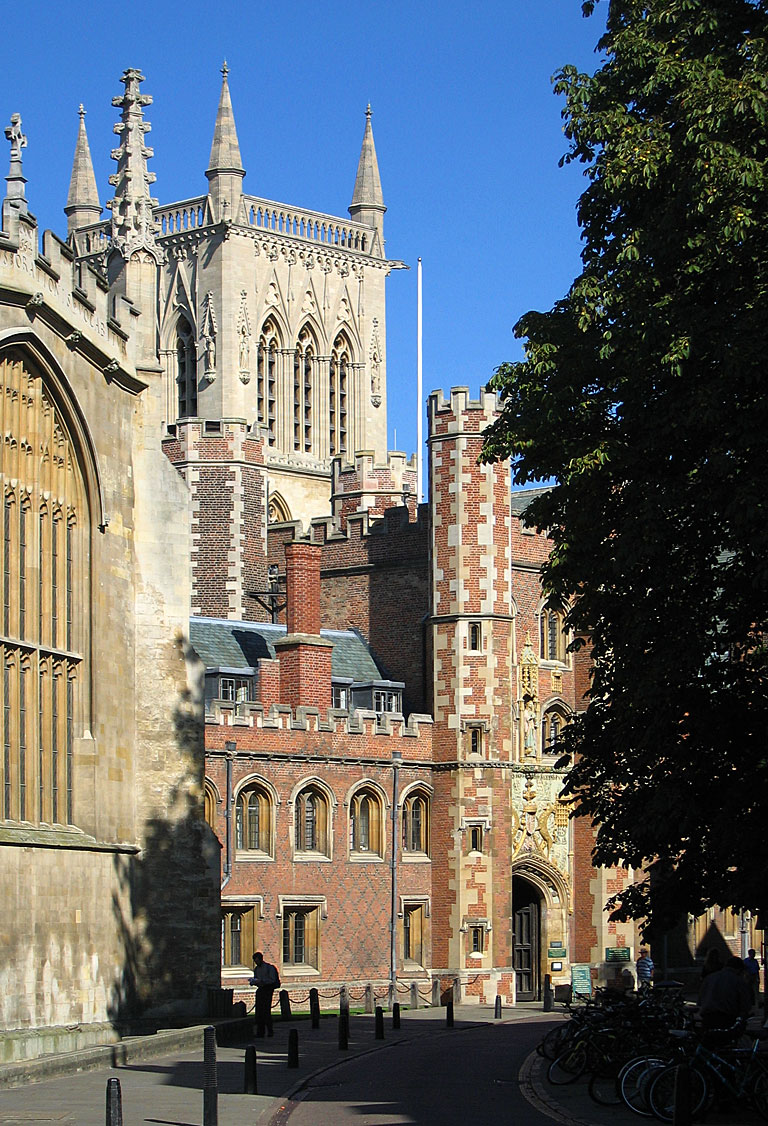
St John’s College, Cambridge, where Raphael studied.

His articles and book reviews have appeared in a number of newspapers and magazines, including The los Angeles Times and The Sunday Times. He has published more than twenty novels, the best-known being the semi-autobiographical The Glittering Prizes (1976), which traces the lives of a group of Cambridge University undergraduates in post-war Britain as they move through university and into the wider world. The original six-part BBC television series, from which the book was adapted, won him a Royal Television Society Writer of the Year Award. The sequel, Fame and Fortune, which continues the story to 1979, was adapted in 2007 and broadcast on BBC Radio 4. In 2010, BBC Radio 4 broadcast a further sequel in a series entitled Final Demands, with Tom Conti as Adam Morris, the central character, bringing the story to the late 1990s.

Raphael has published several history books, collections of essays, and translations. He has also written biographies of W. Somerset Maugham and Lord Byron. He was made a Fellow of the Royal Society of Literature in 1964.

In 1999, Raphael published Eyes Wide Open, a memoir of his collaboration with the director Stanley Kubrick on the screenplay of Eyes Wide Shut, Kubrick's final movie. Raphael wrote a detailed account of his working with Kubrick, based on his own journals, but upon its publication the book was publicly criticised by several of the director's friends and family members, among them Christiane Kubrick, Jan Harlan, and Michael Herr, for its alleged unflattering portrayal of him. Referring to an article by Raphael about his book in The New Yorker, Steven Spielberg and Tom Cruise also professed criticism. That year, Penguin Books published a new translation of Arthur Schnitzler's Dream Story, the basis for Eyes Wide Shut, featuring a new introduction by Raphael.

== Personal life ==
He married Sylvia Betty Glatt, known as 'Beetle', on 17 January 1955, and they had three children and nine grandchildren. His daughter, Sarah Raphael, was an English artist known for her portraits. She died in 2001.

== Selected works ==
=== Film and TV ===
Year	Title	Director	Notes
1958	Bachelor of Hearts	Wolf Rilla	Co-written with Leslie Bricusse
1964	Nothing but the Best	Clive Donner	Edgar Allan Poe Award - Best Foreign Film
1965	Darling	John Schlesinger	Academy Award for Best Original Screenplay; BAFTA Film Award for Best British Screenplay; Writers Guild of Great Britain Award - Best British Comedy Screenplay
1967	Far from the Madding Crowd	John Schlesinger	
1967	Two for the Road	Stanley Donen	Nominated - Academy Award for Best Original Screenplay; Nominated - BAFTA Film Award for Best British Screenplay
1970	A Severed Head	Dick Clement	
1974	Daisy Miller	Peter Bogdanovich	
1976	The Glittering Prizes	Waris Hussein and Robert Knights	TV series
1976	Rogue Male	Clive Donner	TV film
1980	Richard's Things	Anthony Harvey	Based on his novel
1984	Oxbridge Blues	James Cellan Jones and Richard Stroud	TV series CableACE Award for Best Writing a Dramatic Series; Based on his short story collection Sleeps Six and other stories (1979); Also directed the episode "He'll See You Now"
1990	After the War	John Madden, John Glenister, Nicholas Renton, and Michael Cox	TV series Based on his novel
1990	The King's Whore	Axel Corti	
1991	Women and Men: Stories of Seduction	Self-directed	TV film Segment "The Man in the Brooks Brothers Suit"
1999	Eyes Wide Shut	Stanley Kubrick	
2003	Coast to Coast	Paul Mazursky	Based on his novel

=== Fiction ===
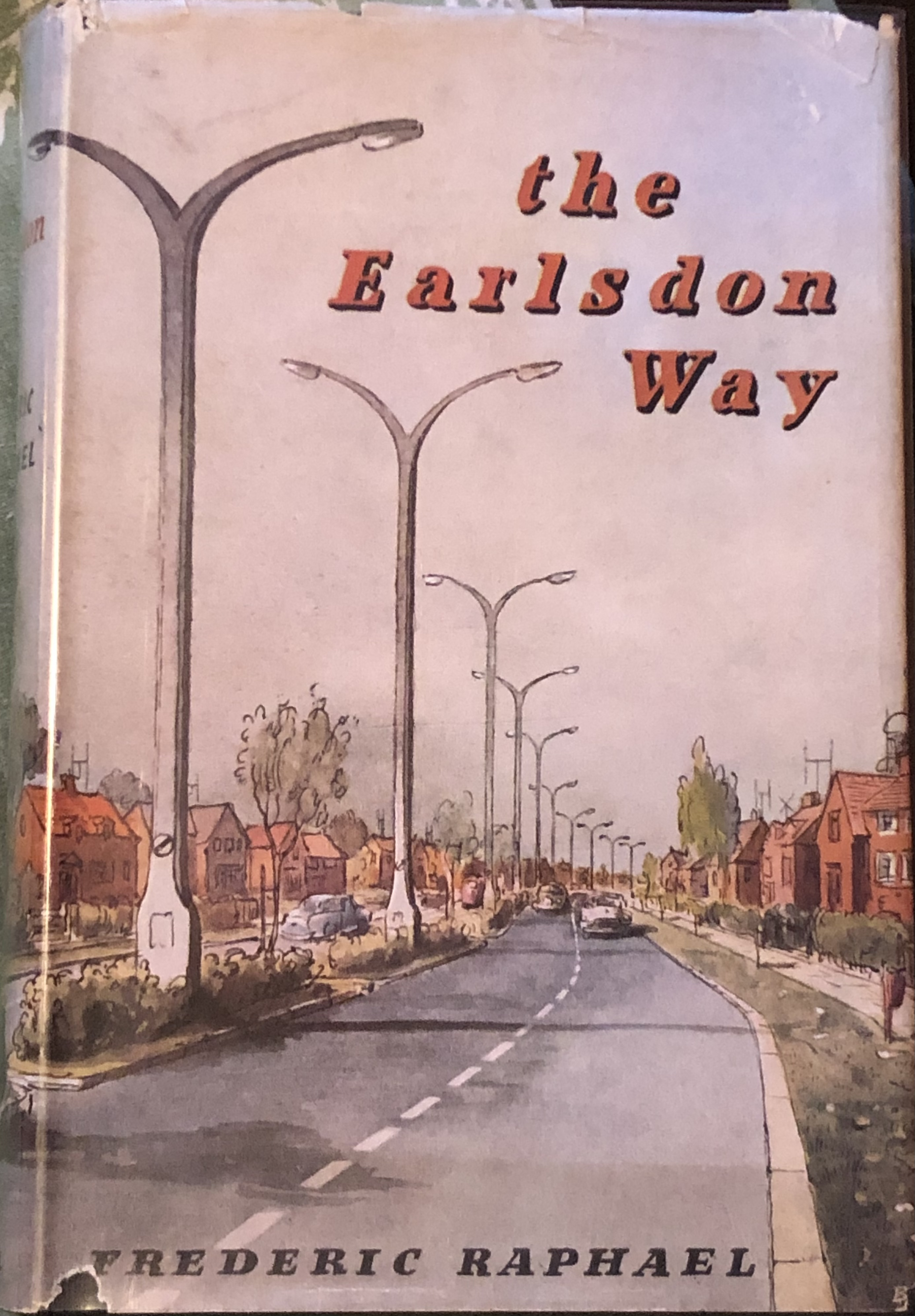
The Earlsdon Way by Frederic Raphael, 1st Edition cover, 1958

- Obbligato (1956)
- The Earlsdon Way (1958)
- The Limits of Love (1960)
- A Wild Surmise (1961)
- The Graduate Wife (1962)
- The Trouble with England (1962)
- Lindmann (1963)
- Darling (1965) (novelization of his screenplay)
- Orchestra and Beginners (1967)
- Like Men Betrayed (1970)
- Who Were You With Last Night? (1971)
- April, June and November (1972)
- Richard's Things (1973)
- California Time (1975)
- The Glittering Prizes (1976) (adapted from the TV series)
- Sleeps Six and other stories (1979) (short story collection)
- Heaven and Earth (1985)
- Think of England (1986)
- After the War (1990)
- The Hidden Eye (1990)
- Of Gods and Men (1992)
- A Double Life (1993)
- The Latin Lover and Other Stories (1994)
- Coast to Coast (1998)
- Fame and Fortune (2007) (sequel to The Glittering Prizes)
- Final Demands (2010) (sequel to Fame and Fortune)
- Private Views (2015)

=== Non-fiction ===
- Somerset Maugham and his World (1976)
- The List of Books: A Library of Over 3000 Works (1981) (with Kenneth McLeish)
- Byron (1982)
- The Necessity of Anti-Semitism (1998)
- Popper: Historicism and Its Poverty (1998)
- Some Talk of Alexander: A Journey Through Space and Time in the Greek World (2006)
- Literary Genius: 25 Classic Writers Who Define English & American Literature (2007) One Chapter on William Hazlitt
- How Stanley Kubrick Met His Waterloo (2011) (for the Wall Street Journal)
- A Jew Among Romans: The Life and Legacy of Flavius Josephus (2013)
- Distant Intimacy: A Friendship in the Age of the Internet (2013) (with Joseph Epstein)
- Where Were We?: The Conversation Continues (2015) (with Joseph Epstein)
- Anti-Semitism (2015)
- The World's Game (2024)

=== Translations ===
- The Serpent Son = Oresteia by Aeschylus (translated with Kenneth McLeish) (1978)
- The Poems of Catullus (translated with Kenneth McLeish) (1979)

=== Memoirs ===
- Eyes Wide Open: A Memoir of Stanley Kubrick (1999)
- Personal Terms (2001)
- The Benefits of Doubt: Essays (2003)
- A Spoilt Boy: A Memoir of a Childhood (2003)
- Rough Copy: Personal Terms 2 (2004)
- Cuts and Bruises: Personal Terms 3 (2006)
- Ticks and Crosses: Personal Terms 4 (2009)
- Ifs and Buts: Personal Terms 5 (2011)
- There and Then: Personal Terms 6 (2013)
- Going Up: To Cambridge and Beyond - A Writer's Memoir (2015)
- Against the Stream: Personal Terms 7 (2018)
- Last Post (2023)
