= Die Dame =

Defunct illustrated women's magazine in Germany (1911–1943)

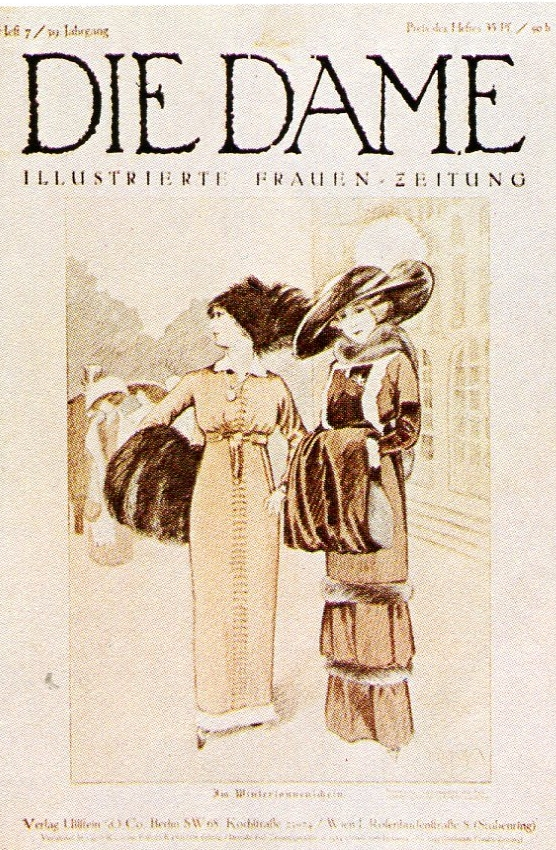
Die Dame 1912

Die Dame (English: The Lady) was the first illustrated magazine in Germany to cater to the interests of modern women. It was also considered the "best journal of its kind in the world market" after the First World War. The lifestyle magazine began in 1911 and ended in 1943. Die Dame consisted of essays, illustrations, and photography. The magazine was most active during the shift from the early 1920s, when the magazine celebrated the independent The New Woman, to the mid-1920s when women were portrayed as cold and masculine uniformity.

== History ==
In 1912, the Berlin publishing House Ullstein bought out Illustrierte Frauen-Zeitung (English: Illustrated Women's Newspaper) because the company founder Leopold Ullstein's five sons had already recognized that many women were affluent consumers but that Ullstein had no products specifically for them. The newspaper's content was thrifty advice on fashion and housekeeping. In 1912, the Illustrierte Frauen-Zeitung became Die Dame.

=== 1920-1925 ===
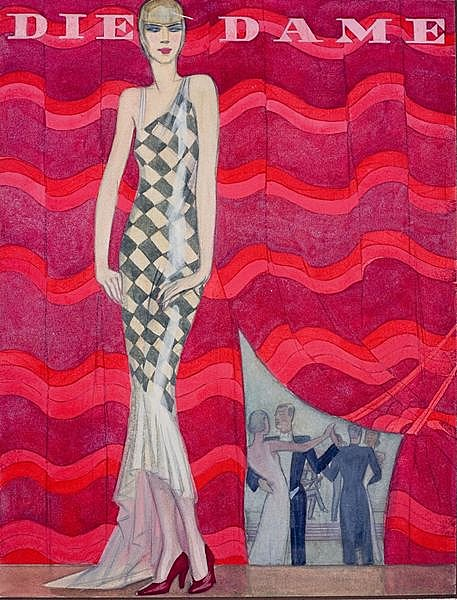
Janina Dłuska, Cover design for Die Dame magazine, 1920s.

In the early 1920s, the magazine promoted independent and career driven women. Most of the original fashion layouts and cover pages were created by mostly female designers and artists such as Erica Mohr, Hanna Goerke, Martha Sparkuhl, Janina Dłuska, Julie Haase-Werkenthin, Gerda Bunzel, and Steffie Nathan. Renowned male commentators such as writer Friedrich Freksa and costume historian Max von Boehn were granted a large amount of space in Die Dame. The article discussed the phenomenon of fashion within a broader and cultural-historical frame in hopes of enlightening women. In 1923, Petra Fiedler, the daughter of the well-known modernist architect Peter Behrens, joined Die Dame's design team which caused the magazine to become more popular.

=== 1925-1930 ===
In 1925, a Viennese designer, Ernst Dryden, was named chief artistic director of Die Dame, which caused a shift from the previous positive tone of modernity. In 1925–26, Arthur Schnitzler's Traumnovelle (English: Rhapsody: A Dream Novel) was serialized in Die Dame before being published in book form. By 1927 the photographs of female fashion editors and illustrators disappeared from the pages. Their work was given less and less visible space in the magazine, while Dryden's drawings and essay took over the magazine. His fashion layouts denied the individualization of the modern women, showing geometrical silhouettes arranged in a chorus line. In his works illustrated that women's experience of fashion are completely detached from the understanding of everyday life. They carried the markers of self-centered arrogance that invited many critics of the New Woman to misunderstand the New Woman.

=== After 1930 ===
In 1930, Dryden produced a cover design showing an elegant woman clutching a dog and standing in front of a Bugatti. His cover for November 1928 showing a languid beauty in the middle of a vast circle of sports cars all pointed lustfully towards her, is an image of the Jazz age Woman to match celebrity, Tamara's iconic self-portrait. Die Dame continued to be published under Nazi rule even though their publishing house, Ullstein, was expropriated because it was a Jewish family enterprise. Helen Grund was one of the few fashion journalists of the 1920s whose careers remained. Die Dame was finally discontinued two years before the end of the war because, as the edition stated, "manpower and material need to be freed up for other purposes in the interests of the war economy."

== Readership ==
There is no reliable information about the magazine's readership, but the publisher's concept and price suggest that it circulated among women of the middle and upper-middle classes. A single issue of the journal, which by 1939 had reached a circulation of 32,870, cost 1.50 Reichsmark in the 1920s, ten times the cost of a copy of the popular daily newspaper Berliner Tageblatt.

Die Dame was publicized by Ullstein as "the society magazine with an international reputation" and the German luxury magazine with the highest circulation (50,890) in 1929.

== Historical context ==
In World War I, the men had gone to the battlefields and women had to take over the men's jobs. They worked in war factories, hospitals, farms, shops, and single-handedly cared for the children. When the men came back from the war, some of the women resented being pushed back into domestic jobs. By early 1921, there was a labor shortage and the women were enticed to go back to work. Women's labor and female workers had become widely noticeable since World War I. This caused social disruption and gender recasting. In addition, women were granted the right to vote.

== Challenging gender roles ==
In 1926, Die Dame introduced the spring fashion season with a manipulation of traditional gender roles: sketches of female models in smoking jackets and short masculine haircuts and are accompanied by male models who dress in a similar fashion. Although this representation of the New Woman was frequently condemned for reinforcing the "masculinization" of female gender identity, it considered sexual mobility between femininity and masculinity to be the distinguishing feature of women's fashion. In a fashion layout in 1926, the female figures retain feminine styles in their ruffled shirts and ribbon bow ties but appropriate at the same time as excess of masculine styles in their dinner suits and waistcoats which deemphasize the body.
