= Sarah Raphael =

English artist (1960-2001)

Sarah Natasha Raphael (10 August 1960 – 10 January 2001) was an English artist best known for her portraits and draughtsmanship.

== Early life ==
Raphael was born on 10 August 1960 in East Bergholt, Suffolk – in the same birthplace village as John Constable, the renowned landscape painter, who was born in 1776. Her parents were Sylvia Betty Glatt and Frederic Raphael – screenwriter, novelist and journalist. She had two siblings.

Her family lived abroad for long periods of time. "As a little girl aged seven, she was dazzled by the beauty of the Greek island Ios, where she lived with her family. She started painting it then and there with her little box of paints, and she would return to the motif later in adult life."

Sarah was educated at Bedales School (Steep, Hampshire), and subsequently studied art at Camberwell School of Art, London, 1978 – 81, graduating with a First Class Honours Degree.

== Career ==
Raphael worked in several media and in both figurative and abstract styles. As a portrait painter she gained recognition at the highest level and is featured on The National Portrait Gallery's website. Charles Saumarez Smith, director of the National Portrait Gallery, called her "one of the finest figurative artists of the generation".

She was an accomplished, assured draftsman. A survey of her work is provided by the book, Sarah Raphael Drawings, published by Carcanet Press Ltd, October 2004. As William Boyd has written of her figurative works, "You can tell how good they are yourself: you don't need the imprimatur of a gallery or a dealer or a patron."

Initially notable for her portraits, Raphael's paintings became progressively more abstract, especially evident through the series: Desert Paintings (mid-90s), STRIP! (1997) and Time Travel for Beginners (2000).

Of particular note of her prints (etchings and monotypes) are the Small Objects works, which relate to the STRIP! paintings. She illustrated books written by her father, Frederic, The Hidden I: A Myth Revisited in 1990 and Of Gods and Men in 1992.

She has works hanging in the Metropolitan Museum in New York and in several large corporate collections as well as London's National Portrait Gallery. She was so much in demand that her paintings cost £50,000 in 1995.

== Personal life and death ==
Raphael married Nick McDowell in 1985 and they had three daughters. She and her husband were separated at the time of her death.

She died from septicaemia following pneumonia, aged 40, on 10 January 2001.

== Exhibitions and career milestones ==
- 1978 – Work included in exhibition, Mixed Drawings, Whitechapel Gallery, London
- 1985 – Solo exhibition, Christopher Hull Gallery, London
- 1989 and 1992 – Solo exhibitions, Agnew's Gallery, London*
- 1993 – Winner of the Villiers David Prize 1995 – Solo exhibition, Desert Paintings and other Recent Work, Agnew's Gallery, London and Fitzwilliam Museum, Cambridge
- 1996 – Winner of the Nat West Painting Prize, Royal Academy, London
- 1997 – Solo exhibition, STRIP!, Marlborough Fine Art Gallery, London
- 2000 – Childhood Cube (sculpture) for the Millennium Dome exhibition
- 2000 – Solo exhibition, Small Objects in Transit (etchings and monotypes), Marlborough Graphics, London
- 2003 – (Posthumous) solo exhibition, A Survey of Work from 1994 to 2001, Marlborough Fine Art Gallery, London
