= Kenneth McLeish =

British writer, playwright and translator

John Kenneth Tyrrell McLeish, known as Kenneth McLeish (1940–1997) was a British writer, playwright and translator. McLeish, "the most widely respected and prolific translator of drama in Britain", translated all the surviving classical Greek plays, most plays by Henrik Ibsen and Georges Feydeau, and individual plays by Plautus, Molière, Alfred Jarry, August Strindberg, Ödön von Horváth and Eugène Marin Labiche.

== Life ==
McLeish was born in Glasgow on 10 October 1940. He was educated at Bradford Grammar School, where he learnt French, Latin and Greek. He taught himself Swedish, Norwegian and Danish. He studied Music and Classics at Worcester College, Oxford before becoming a teacher. He married Valerie Heath in 1965. In 1975 he gave up teaching to write and translate full-time.

McLeish's translations were staged by companies including the Royal Shakespeare Company the National Theatre, the Gate Theatre, Cheek by Jowl and Actors Touring Company. Successful productions included Deborah Warner's 1988 Electra for the RSC, Katie Mitchell's 1991 Women of Troy at the Gate, and Stephen Unwin's' 1996 Hedda Gabler for English Touring Theatre.

He wrote several original plays and filmscripts, including Vice at the Vicarage (1978) for Frankie Howerd and Orpheus (1997) for Actors Touring Company. He also wrote and edited a variety of general literary guides, several in collaboration with his wife.

== Works ==
- (trans. and compiled with Roger Nichols) Through Greek eyes: Greek civilisation in the words of Greek writers, 1974
- (trans. and compiled with Roger Nichols) Through Roman eyes: Greek civilisation in the words of Roman writers, 1976
- (trans. with Frederic Raphael) The serpent son = Oresteia by Aeschylus. 1978.
- (trans. with Frederic Raphael) The poems of Catullus by Catullus. 1978.
- (trans.) Clouds; Women in power; Knights by Aristophanes. 1979.
- (compiled with Frederic Raphael) The list of books, 1980
- The theatre of Aristophanes, 1980
- The shining stars: Greek legends of the zodiac, 1981
- (with Brian Redhead) The Anti-Booklist, 1981
- (with John Bailey and David Spearman) Gods and men: myths and legends from the world's religions, 1981
- (with Valerie Heath) The Oxford first companion to music, 1982
- The Penguin companion to the arts in the twentieth century, 1985
- Longman guide to Shakespeare's characters: a who's who of Shakespeare, 1985
- The Seven Wonders of the World, 1985
- (with Valerie Heath) Listeners' guide to classical music: an introduction to the great classical composers and their works, 1986
- (with Valerie Heath) Longman guide to Bible quotations, 1986
- Bloomsbury good reading guide, 1988
- (with Valerie Heath) Bloomsbury good reading guide to murder, crime fiction, and thrillers, 1990
- (with Valerie Heath) Bloomsbury good reading guide to biography & autobiography, 1991
- Key ideas in human thought, 1993
- Myth: myths and legends of the world explored, 1996
- Aristotle, 1997
