= Dream Story =

1926 novella by Arthur Schnitzler

Rhapsody
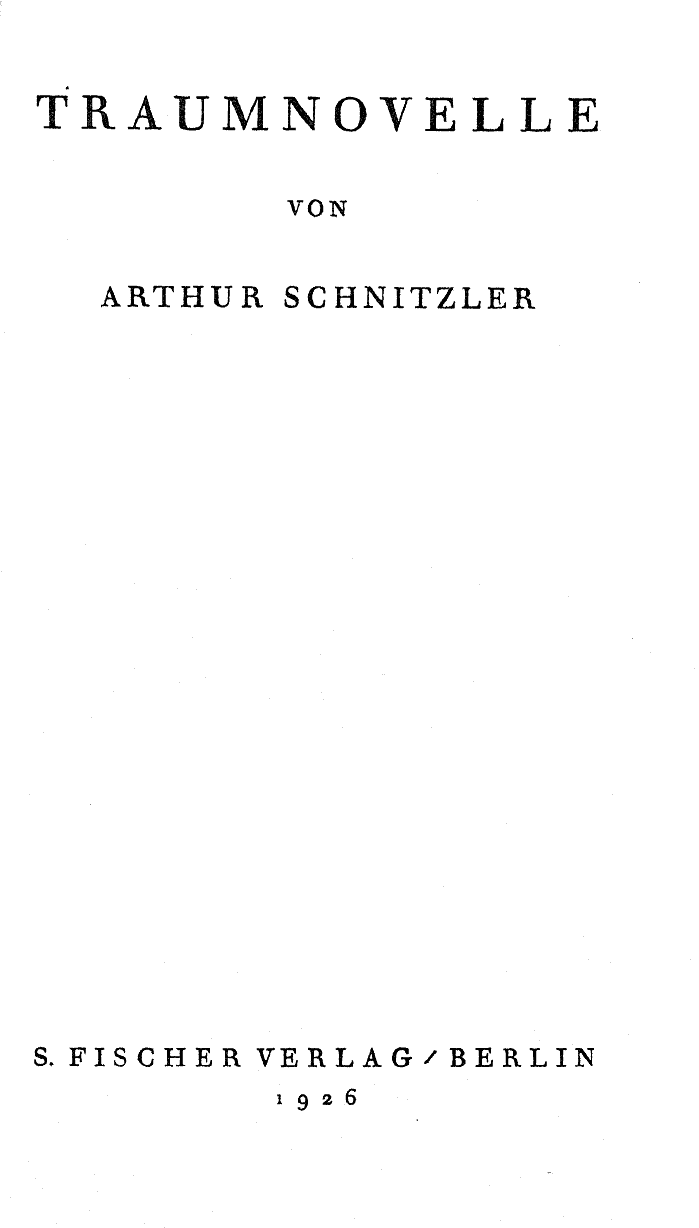
- Title page of Traumnovelle, Berlin 1926
- Author: Arthur Schnitzler
- Original title: Traumnovelle
- Translator: J.M.Q. Davies
- Language: German
- Publisher: S. Fischer Verlag
- Publication date: 1926 (orig. German)
- Publication place: Austria
- Media type: Print (Hardback & Paperback)
- Pages: 128 pp (Eng. trans. paperback edition)
- ISBN: 0-14-118224-5 (Eng. trans. paperback edition)
- OCLC: 41258497

Rhapsody: A Dream Novel, also known as Dream Story (German: Traumnovelle), is a 1926 novella by the Austrian writer Arthur Schnitzler. The book deals with the thoughts and psychological transformations of Doctor Fridolin over a two-day period after his wife confesses having had sexual fantasies involving another man. In this short time, he meets many people who give clues to the world Schnitzler creates. This culminates in the masquerade ball, an event of masked identity, sex, and danger for Doctor Fridolin, the outsider.

It was first published in installments in the magazine Die Dame between December 1925 and March 1926. The first book edition appeared in 1926 in S. Fischer Verlag. The best known of the film adaptations is the 1999 film Eyes Wide Shut by director-screenwriter Stanley Kubrick and co-screenwriter Frederic Raphael, although it makes significant alterations to the setting. Prior to this film, it had been adapted for Austrian television in 1969; as an Italian film entitled Il cavaliere, la morte e il diavolo in 1983; and as a low-budget Italian film entitled Nightmare in Venice in 1989.

The book belongs to the period of the Decadent movement in Vienna after the turn of the 20th century.

== Story ==
Dream Story is set in early-20th-century Vienna during Mardi Gras. The protagonist of the story is Fridolin, a successful 35-year-old doctor who lives with his wife, Albertina (also translated as Albertine), and their young daughter.

One night, Albertina confesses that the previous summer, while they were on vacation in Denmark, she had a sexual fantasy about a young Danish military officer. Fridolin then admits that during that same vacation, he had been attracted to a young girl on the beach. Later that night, Fridolin is called to the deathbed of an important patient. Finding the man dead, he is shocked when the man's daughter, Marianne, professes her love to him. Restless, Fridolin leaves and begins to walk the streets. Although tempted, he refuses the offer of a young prostitute named Mizzi.

He encounters his old friend Nachtigall, who tells Fridolin that he will be playing piano at a secret high-society orgy that night. Intrigued, Fridolin procures a mask and costume and follows Nachtigall to the party at a private residence. Fridolin is shocked to find several men in masks and costumes, along with naked women wearing only masks, engaged in various sexual activities. When a young woman warns him to leave, Fridolin ignores her plea and is soon exposed as an interloper. The woman then announces to the gathering that she will sacrifice herself for Fridolin, and he is allowed to leave.

Upon his return home, Albertina awakens and describes a dream she has had: while making love to the Danish officer from her sexual fantasies, she had watched without sympathy as Fridolin was tortured and crucified before her eyes. Fridolin is outraged because he believes that this proves his wife wants to betray him. He resolves to pursue his own sexual temptations.

The next day, Fridolin learns that Nachtigall has been taken away by two mysterious men. He then goes to the costume shop to return his costume and discovers that the shop owner is prostituting his teenage daughter to various men. He finds his way back to where the orgy had taken place the previous night; before he can enter, he is handed a note addressed to him by name that warns him not to pursue the matter. Later, he visits Marianne, but she no longer expresses any interest in him. Fridolin searches for Mizzi, the prostitute, but is unable to find her. He reads that a young woman has been poisoned. Suspecting that she is the woman who sacrificed herself for him, he views the woman's corpse in the morgue but cannot identify her.

Fridolin returns home that night to find Albertina asleep, with his mask from the previous night set on the pillow on his side of the bed. When she wakes up, Fridolin confesses all of his activities. After listening quietly, Albertina comforts him. Albertina tells him not to look too far into the future, and that the important thing is that they survived their adventures.

The story ends with them greeting the new day with their daughter.

== Adaptations ==
- Traumnovelle is a 1969 Austrian television film adaptation directed by Wolfgang Glück.
- Il cavaliere, la morte e il diavolo is a 1983 Italian film adaptation.
- A low-budget Italian film entitled Nightmare in Venice was adapted from Dream Story in 1989. It was directed by Mario Bianchi, mainly known for low-budget erotic thrillers.
- Stanley Kubrick's 1999 film Eyes Wide Shut, starring Tom Cruise, Nicole Kidman and Sydney Pollack, is the best-known adaptation. It is modernized and Americanized, set in New York City in 1999 during the Christmas season, rather than 1900 Vienna during Mardi Gras.
- Jakob Hinrichs' graphic novel adaptation of Traumnovelle was published in 2012.
- A dramatic reading of the book by Paul Rhys was broadcast on BBC Radio 7 and BBC Radio 4 Extra in 2021, as Dream Story.
- German director Florian Frerichs' 2024 film adaptation, Traumnovelle (aka Dream Story), is set in contemporary Berlin and stars Nikolai Kinski and Laurine Price.

== English translations ==
- 1927 – Rhapsody: A Dream Novel – Translated by Otto P. Schinnerer.
- 1999 – Dream Story – Translated by J.M.Q. Davies.
- 2002 – Dream Story (in the collection Night Games: and Other Stories and Novellas) – Translated by Margret Schaefer.
