= Abigail Good =

British actor and model

- Born: September 30, 1971 (age 55); Leicester, Leicestershire, England
- Occupations: Fashion model; actress; travel writer; journalist; fashion photographer

Abigail Elizabeth Good (born 30 September 1971) is an English former fashion model and travel writer. Now a journalist and fashion photographer, she has also taken stills on films. Good works under the surname Campbell.

== Early and personal life ==
Abigail Elizabeth Good was born in Leicester on 30 September, 1971 and raised in Singapore. She returned to England as a teenager, and went to school in Bromsgrove. Good now lives in East Sussex, England.

== Career ==
After modelling for ten years, Good was selected by Stanley Kubrick to play the role of the "Mysterious Woman" in his 1999 film Eyes Wide Shut. She was the last actress Stanley Kubrick filmed. Her voice was dubbed over by Cate Blanchett, as Good's American accent was not considered convincing enough.

Good also appeared as Tabatha in Randall's Flat cast as a forthright, manipulative woman with striking good looks, and another role as a "mysterious blonde" in the 2002 film Butterfly Man.

== Filmography ==
Year	Title	Role	Notes
1999	Eyes Wide Shut	Mysterious Woman	
2001	Randall's Flat	Tabatha	
2002	Butterfly Man	No Name	(final film role)
