= Butterfly Man =

- Thai film poster
- Directed by: Kaprice Kea
- Written by: Kaprice Kea
- Produced by: Tom Waller
- Starring: Stuart Laing; Napakpapha Nakprasitte; Francis McGee; Gavan O'Herlihy; Vasa Vatcharayon; Abigail Good; Kirsty Mitchell
- Cinematography: Mark Duffield
- Edited by: Atisthan Sangawut; William Watts
- Music by: Steve Bentley-Klein
- Production companies: De Warenne Pictures; GMM Grammy
- Distributed by: GMM Pictures
- Release date: 6 December 2002 (Thailand)
- Running time: 95 minutes
- Countries: Thailand; United Kingdom
- Language: English

Butterfly Man (Thai: ผีเสื้อร้อนรัก) is a 2002 Thai-British adventure-romantic drama film directed and written by Kaprice Kea and starring Stuart Laing and Napakpapha Nakprasitte.

== Plot ==
Napakpapha Nakprasitte as Em.

Adam, an English backpacker, breaks up with his girlfriend immediately after arriving with her in Thailand. He then strikes out on his own, leaving Bangkok for Ko Samui. There, he meets Em, a young masseuse. At first, their relationship is innocent, but Adam soon grows frustrated and starts hitting the bars and becoming a sex tourist, or "butterfly man", flirting from woman to woman. Meanwhile, the ugly side of Samui starts to reveal itself, with a human trafficking, slavery, and prostitution ring, run by British mafia, exposed. Adam gets in trouble with the British mafia. Em helps him get away, so the British mafia beats her severely. Adam manages to escape via a small boat, taking Em with him. They get married on the boat but then Em dies. He keeps his promise to take her body to her home village and ends up staying in Thailand.

== Cast ==
- Stuart Laing as Adam
- Napakpapha Nakprasitte as Em
- Francis Magee as Joey
- Carl Henry Exantus as Michael
- Gavan O'Herlihy as Bill Kincaid
- Abigail Good as No Name
- Vasa Vatcharayon as Noi
- Kirsty Mitchell as Kate
- Gareth Myles as Clive
