= Crystoleum =

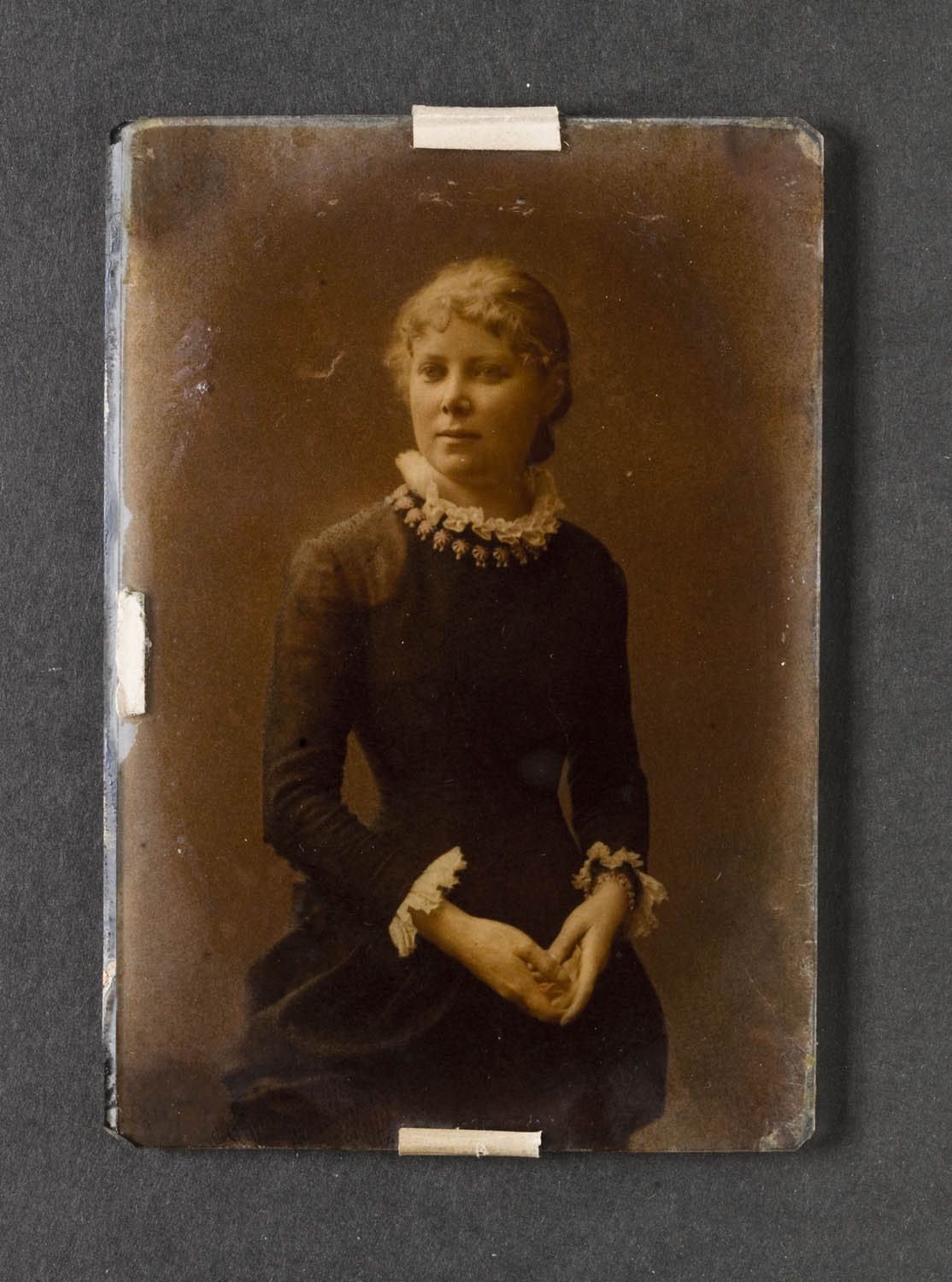
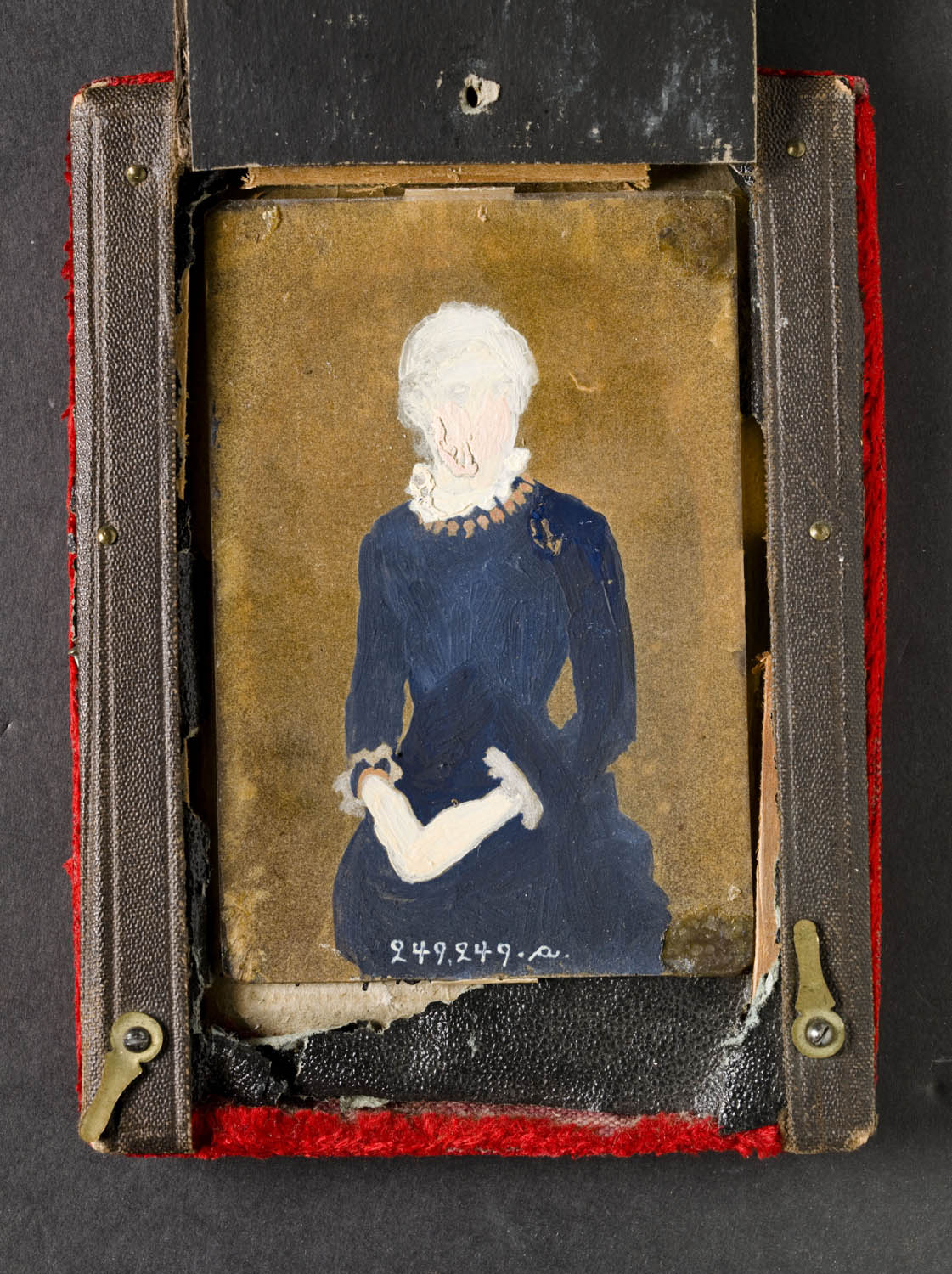
1893 Crystoleum print, showing the front and back.

The crystoleum, from "crystal" + "oleum" (oil), process was a method of applying colour to an albumen print, popular from c. 1880 – c. 1910.

An albumen print was pasted face down to the inside of a concave piece of glass. Once the adhesive (usually starch paste or gelatin) was dry, the paper backing of the print was rubbed away, leaving only the transparent emulsion on the glass. The image was then coloured by hand, using oil paints. Another piece of glass was added to the back and this could also be coloured by hand. Both pieces of glass were bound together creating a detailed, albeit fragile, image. The process was derived from the 18th century mezzotint process.
