= Thailand Film Office =

Thai government agency

Thailand Film Office : TFO
- กองกิจการภาพยนตร์และวีดิทัศน์ต่างประเทศ

Government agency overview
- Government agency executive: Ubolwan Sucharitkul, Director
- Website: tfo.dot.go.th

The Thailand Film Office is a Thai government agency that supports and facilitates foreign film production teams in Thailand and acts as an information center for foreign film production crew. The TFO's main objectives are as follows:

- To generate national income and to promote tourism, culture and arts in Thailand
- To grant permits for filmmaking and monitoring said film to ensure that it does not adversely affect Thailand
- To coordinate with other Thai government agencies involved in order to facilitate the work of foreign film crews
- To act as the assistant secretary agency to the national film committee
- To be an effective member of the Association of Film Commissioners International (AFCI)
- To participate in international film festivals to promote Thailand as a filming location and persuade film makers to use locally available film production services, such as equipment and film crews

== Work ==
Dozens of foreign films have been shot in Thailand under the guise of the TFO, with the nation either playing itself or standing in for a neighboring country, such as Vietnam or Cambodia. The availability of elephants, exotic jungle and beach settings, relatively low production costs, and a mature domestic film industry with many experienced crew members have made Thailand an attractive location for many Hollywood films and other foreign productions. Films set in Thailand include Around the World in Eighty Days, The Big Boss, The Man with the Golden Gun and The Beach. Thailand has also been used as a stand-in setting for Vietnam War-era films such as The Deer Hunter, Good Morning, Vietnam, Casualties of War and The Killing Fields. In addition to providing work for Thai film crews and others, such as the Royal Thai Army, films that use Thailand as a location help Thailand promote itself as a tourist destination. As a result, the Tourism Authority of Thailand is keenly interested in attracting production companies to make films in the nation. However, the locations of certain films have been criticized as being harmful to the environment. The island used to depict the villain's hideout in The Man with the Golden Gun is now a major draw for tourism operators in Phang Nga Bay, Phuket. Environmentalists also protested the filming of The Beach, in which the film crew made alterations to the location that were viewed as damaging. Hollywood has played an important role in the development of Thailand's film industry. One of the first feature films made in Thailand, 1923's Miss Suwanna of Siam, was a Hollywood co-production, made with the assistance of King Vajiravudh, who gave the production free use of his 52 automobiles, 600 horses, use of the Royal Thai Navy, the Grand Palace, the railways, the rice mills, rice fields, coconut groves, canals and elephants. The 1927 documentary, Chang, by Merian C. Cooper and Ernest B. Schoedsack, was made in Thailand. In recent years, even the Bollywood film industry has chosen Thailand as location.

== Services ==
The Thailand Film Office website provides an array of information and services covering Thailand in general, visas and work permits, related government agencies and filming associations in the nation, filming in Thailand media, and lists of studios and equipment in Thailand. According to the Thai Film Act of 2008, any foreigners wishing to film in Thailand are required to hire a local production coordinator, which can be either an individual or a firm that has recognized by the Thailand Film Office.

The Thailand Film Office is looking to find future generations of filmmakers and is the official organizer of the Thailand Short Film Competition, which has been running since 2002.

According to Sirinart Theenanondh, chief of film business promotion at the Thailand Film Office, more big budget films are choosing Thailand as a filming location due to Thailand's incentives offered to international films shot locally, with 74 feature films making up a total of 714 productions that used Thailand for shooting in 2018.

== Related associations in Thailand ==
- Film Production Services Association
- Thai Entertainment Industry Association (TENA)
- The Advertising Association of Thailand
- The Federation of National Film Association of Thailand
- Thai Motion Picture Industry Association
- Thai Film Directors Association
- Thai Film Foundation
- Thai Documentary Filmmakers Trade Association (TDFA)
