= Stanley Kubrick bibliography =

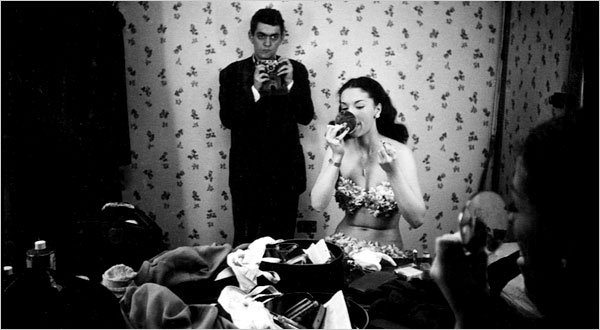
Kubrick in 1949 while working as a photographer for Look magazine

A list of books and essays about Stanley Kubrick and his films.

== Biographies and interviews ==
- Aragno, Riccardo (1999). Kubrick: storia di un'amicizia [Kubrick: Story of a Friendship] (in Italian). Fasano, Italy: Schena. ISBN 978-8882291525.
- Baxter, John (1998). Stanley Kubrick: A Biography. London, England: HarperCollins. ISBN 978-0-00-638445-8.
- D'Alessandro, Emilio; Ulivieri, Filippo (5 September 2012). Stanley Kubrick e me. Trent'anni accanto a lui. Rivelazioni e cronache inedite dell'assistente personale di un genio [Stanley Kubrick and Me: Thirty Years Next to Him – Revelations and Unreleased Chronicles by a Genius' Personal Assistant] (in Italian). Milano, Italy: Il Saggiatore. ISBN 978-88-6576-239-4.
- Di Flaviano, Mauro; Greco, Federico; Landini, Stefano (2001). Stanley and Us (one book + one VCR) (in Italian). Torino, Italy: Lindau. ISBN 978-8871803784.
- Herr, Michael (2001). Kubrick. London, England: Pan Macmillan. ISBN 978-0-330-48113-7.
- Kolker, Robert P.; Abrams, Nathan (2024). Kubrick: An Odyssey. New York, N.Y.: Pegasus. ISBN 978-1639366248.
- Kubrick, Christiane (2002). Stanley Kubrick: A Life in Pictures. Boston, Mass.: Little, Brown and Company. ISBN 978-0-8212-2815-9.
- LoBrutto, Vincent (April 1999). Stanley Kubrick: A Biography. Boston, Mass.: Da Capo. ISBN 978-0-306-80906-4.
- Lyons, Viktoria; Fitzgerald, Michael (1 January 2005). "Stanley Kubrick (1928-1999)". Asperger Syndrome: A Gift or a Curse?. Hauppauge, N.Y.: Nova Biomedical. pp. 185–195. ISBN 978-1-59454-387-6.
- Mikics, David (18 August 2020). Stanley Kubrick: American Filmmaker. New Haven, Conn.: Yale University Press. ISBN 978-0-300-22440-5.
- Molina Foix, Vicente (30 May 2019). Kubrick en casa [Kubrick at Home] (in Spanish). Barcelona, Spain: Anagrama. ISBN 978-8433916297.
- Phillips, Gene D. (1 January 2001). Stanley Kubrick: Interviews. Jackson, Miss.: University Press of Mississippi. ISBN 978-1-57806-297-3.
- Ulivieri, Filippo (6 November 2024). Sulla Luna con Stanley Kubrick: miti, leggende e verità sul mostro sacro del cinema [On the Moon with Stanley Kubrick: Myths, Legends and Truths About Cinema's Sacred Monster] (in Italian). Loreto, Italy: StreetLib. ISBN 979-1223076774.
- Ulivieri, Filippo (15 December 2024). Cracking the Kube: Solving the Mysteries of Stanley Kubrick Through Archival Research. Independently published. ISBN 979-8344213019.

== General ==
- Vv.Aa. (1998). Stanley Kubrick. Garage: Cinema autori visioni (in Italian) (2nd ed.). Torino, Italy: Paravia Scriptorium. ISBN 978-8839561992.
- Vv.Aa. (1 April 2011). Stanley Kubrick: Eyes Wide Open – Guide de l'exposition [Stanley Kubrick: Eyes Wide Open – Guide to the Exhibition]. Special issue of Trois couleurs on the occasion of the Stanley Kubrick exhibition at the Cinémathèque française (in French). Paris, France: MK2 Multimédia. ISBN 978-2351360132.
- Vv.Aa. (10 November 2020). El cine de Stanley Kubrick [Stanley Kubrick's Cinema] (in Spanish). Málaga, Spain: Cult Books. ISBN 978-8412253870.
- Abrams, Jerold (4 May 2007). The Philosophy of Stanley Kubrick. Lexington, Ky.: University Press of Kentucky. ISBN 978-0-8131-7256-9.
- Abrams, Nathan (19 April 2018). Stanley Kubrick: New York Jewish Intellectual. New Brunswick, N.J.: Rutgers University Press. ISBN 978-0813587103.
- Abrams, Nathan; Hunter, I.Q., eds. (2021). The Bloomsbury Companion to Stanley Kubrick. London, England: Bloomsbury Academic. ISBN 978-1501343629.
- Abrams, Nathan; Szaniawski, Jeremi, eds. (October 2004). Kubrick's Mitteleuropa: The Central European Imaginary in the Films of Stanley Kubrick. New York, N.Y.: Berghahn. ISBN 978-1805396451.
- Azulys, Sam (16 April 2011). Stanley Kubrick : une odyssée philosophique [Stanley Kubrick: A Philosophical Odyssey] (in French). Chatou, France: Transparence. ISBN 978-2350510620.
- Bane, Charles (2006). Viewing Novels, Reading Films: Stanley Kubrick and the Art of Adaptation as Interpretation. Baton Rouge, La.: Louisiana State University and Agricultural & Mechanical College. ISBN 978-0-542-81110-4.
- Bailey, Peter J., ed. (29 July 2016). Stanley Kubrick. Critical Insights Film. Hackensack, N.J.: Salem. ISBN 978-1682171080.
- Barg, Werner C.; Plöger, Thomas (1996). Kino der Grausamkeit : die Filme von Sergio Leone, Stanley Kubrick, David Lynch, Martin Scorsese, Oliver Stone, Quentin Tarantino [Cinema of Cruelty: The Films of Sergio Leone, Stanley Kubrick, David Lynch, Martin Scorsese, Oliver Stone, Quentin Tarantino] (in German). Frankfurt am Main, Germany: Bundesverband Jugend und Film. ISBN 3890171478.
- Becker, Andreas (22 February 2024). Scham und Schuld in der filmischen Dramaturgie: Überlegungen zur Darstellung bei Alexander Kluge und Khavn de la Cruz, Edgar Reitz, Frank Wedekind, G.W. Pabst, Günther Anders, Stanley Kubrick, Christian Petzold und Nagisa Ōshima [Shame and Guilt in Film Dramaturgy: Reflections on Representation by Alexander Kluge and Khavn de la Cruz, Edgar Reitz, Frank Wedekind, G.W. Pabst, Günther Anders, Stanley Kubrick, Christian Petzold and Nagisa Oshima] (in German). Marburg, Germany: Büchner. ISBN 978-3963173721.
- Berg, Nicole M. (2020). Discovering Kubrick's Symbolism: The Secrets of the Films. Jefferson, N.C.: McFarland & Company. ISBN 978-1-4766-8049-1.
- Bernardi, Sandro (19 November 2020). Kubrick e il cinema come arte del visibile [Kubrick and Cinema as the Art of the Visible] (in Italian) (Revised and expanded ed.). Imola, Italy: Cue Press. ISBN 978-8855100885.
- Bjørkly, Arnstein, ed. (2000). Kubrick: overblikk og labyrint [Kubrick: Overlook and Labyrinth] (in Norwegian Bokmål). Oslo, Norway: Aschehoug. ISBN 978-8203182907.
- Borin, Fabrizio, ed. (13 March 2002). The Kubrick After: influssi e contaminazioni sul cinema contemporaneo [The Kubrick After: Influence on and Contamination of Contemporary Cinema] (in Italian). Padova, Italy: Il Poligrafo. ISBN 978-8871151199.
- Botz-Bornstein, Thorsten (21 August 2008). Films and Dreams: Tarkovsky, Bergman, Sokurov, Kubrick, and Wong Kar-Wai. Lanham, Md.: Lexington. ISBN 978-0739121887.
- Bouineau, Jean-Marc (1991). Le petit livre de Stanley Kubrick [The Little Book of Stanley Kubrick] (in French). Garches, France: SpartOrange. ISBN 978-2950611208.
- Broderick, Mick, ed. (2019). The Kubrick Legacy. Abingdon-on-Thames, England: Routledge. ISBN 978-0367181420.
- Brunetta, Gian Piero, ed. (1985). Stanley Kubrick: Tempo, spazio, storia e mondi possibili [Stanley Kubrick: Time, Space, History and Possible Worlds] (in Italian). Parma, Italy: Pratiche. ISBN 978-8873800606.
- Brunetta, Gian Piero, ed. (1999). Stanley Kubrick (in Italian). Venezia, Italy: Marsilio. ISBN 978-8831771801.
- Bruno, Marcello Walter (2 March 2017). Il cinema di Stanley Kubrick [The Cinema of Stanley Kubrick] (in Italian). Roma, Italy: Gremese. ISBN 978-0367181420.
- Buache, Freddy (1978). Le cinéma anglais : autour de Kubrick et Losey [English Cinema: On Kubrick and Losey] (in French). Lausanne, Switzerland: L'Âge d'homme. ISBN 978-2866423926.
- Buch, Natalie (24 November 2008). Die Darstellung des Krieges in Filmen von Stanley Kubrick [The Representation of War in Stanley Kubrick's Films] (in German). München, Germany: Grin. ISBN 978-3640217687.
- Cantone, Umberto, ed. (November 2009). Le carte di Kubrick: pubblicità e letteratura di un genio del cinema [Kubrick's Papers: Advertising and Literature of a Cinematic Genius] (in Italian). Palermo, Italy: Sellerio. ISBN 978-8876811760.
- Carocci, Enrico (14 February 2019). Stanley Kubrick (in Italian). Venezia, Italy: Marsilio. ISBN 978-8831785761.
- Carr, Jeremy (June 2023). Kubrick and Control: Authority, Order and Independence in the Films and Working Life of Stanley Kubrick. Liverpool, England: Liverpool University Press. ISBN 978-1802078565.
- Castle, Alison; Kubrick, Stanley (2005). The Stanley Kubrick Archives. Köln, Germany: Taschen. ISBN 978-3-8228-2284-5.
- Chion, Michel (2005). Stanley Kubrick : l'humain, ni plus ni moins [Stanley Kubrick: The Human Being, Neither More nor Less] (in French). Paris, France: Cahiers du cinéma. ISBN 978-2866423926.
- Ciment, Michel (18 September 2003). Kubrick: The Definitive Edition. London, England: Faber and Faber. ISBN 978-0-571-21108-1.
- Cocks, Geoffrey (2004). The Wolf at the Door: Stanley Kubrick, History, & the Holocaust. Lausanne, Switzerland: Lang. ISBN 978-0-8204-7115-0.
- Cocks, Geoffrey; Diedrick, James; Perusek, Glenn (1 August 2006). Depth of Field: Stanley Kubrick, Film, and the Uses of History. Madison, Wis.: University of Wisconsin Press. ISBN 978-0-299-21613-9.
- Coëgnarts, Maarten. Film as Embodied Art: Bodily Meaning in the Cinema of Stanley Kubrick. Boston, Mass.: Academic Studies. ISBN 978-1618118363.
- Colombani, Elsa, ed. (16 October 2020). A Critical Companion to Stanley Kubrick. Critical Companions to Contemporary Directors. Lanham, Md.: Lexington. ISBN 978-1793613769.
- Comuzio, Ermanno (1981). Clair/Cukor/Ford/Kubrick (in Italian). Milano, Italy: Letture. ISBN 8885000452.
- Costanzo, Paolo; Luglio, Carlo (3 August 2013). Le donne di Kubrick [Kubrick's Women] (in Italian). Morrisville, N.C.: Lulu. ISBN 978-1291510867.
- Coyle, Wallace (1980). Stanley Kubrick, a Guide to References and Resources. Boston, Mass.: G. K. Hall. ISBN 978-0-8161-8058-5.
- Daniels, Richard; Ljujić, Tatjana; Kramer, Peter, eds. (7 July 2015). Stanley Kubrick: New Perspectives. London, England: Black Dog. ISBN 978-1908966421.
- De Bernardinis, Flavio (22 August 2019). L'immagine secondo Kubrick [The Image According to Kubrick] (in Italian). Torino, Italy: Lindau. ISBN 978-8833531526.
- De Paoli, Enzo (1 November 2014). Kubrick: il disorientamento dell'individuo [Kubrick: The disorientation of the Individual] (in Italian). Genova, Italy: Erga Edizioni. ISBN 978-8881638253.
- Devries, Daniel (1973). The Films of Stanley Kubrick. Grand Rapids, Mich.: William B. Eerdmans. ISBN 978-0802814814.
- Duncan, Paul (1999). Stanley Kubrick. The Pocket Essentials. London, England: Pocket Essentials. ISBN 978-3-8365-2775-0.
- Duncan, Paul (2011). Stanley Kubrick: Visual Poet 1928–1999. Köln, Germany: Taschen. ISBN 978-3-8365-2775-0.
- Duncan, Paul (4 August 2019). Stanley Kubrick: Eyewitness. Independently published. ISBN 978-1077708624.
- Eberth, Manfred (15 October 2007). Das Motiv der Entfremdung in den Filmen von Stanley Kubrick: Magisterarbeit [The Motif of Alienation in the Films of Stanley Kubrick: Master's Thesis] (in German). München, Germany: Grin. ISBN 978-3638786928.
- Eichhorn, Bernd, ed. (2004). Stanley Kubrick. Vol. 20 of Kinematograph, in connection with the Stanley Kubrick exhibition organized by the Deutsches Filmmuseum and the Deutsches Architekturmuseum. Frankfurt am Main, Germany: Deutsches Filmmuseum. ISBN 978-3887990695.
- Eugeni, Ruggero (2015). Invito al cinema di Kubrick [Invitation to Kubrick's Cinema] (in Italian). Milano, Italy: Mursia. ISBN 9788842554424.
- Falsetto, Mario, ed. (1996). Perspectives on Stanley Kubrick. Boston, Mass.: G. K. Hall. ISBN 978-0-8161-1991-2.
- Falsetto, Mario (1 January 2001). Stanley Kubrick: A Narrative and Stylistic Analysis. Santa Barbara, Cal.: Greenwood. ISBN 978-0-275-96974-5.
- Felden, Thorsten (August 2007). Man/Machine Interaction in the Work of Stanley Kubrick. München, Germany: Grin. ISBN 978-3-638-72193-6.
- Fenwick, James (2020). Stanley Kubrick Produces. New Brunswick, N.J.: Rutgers University Press. ISBN 9781978814882.
- Fenwick, James (4 June 2024). Archive Histories: An Archaeology of the Stanley Kubrick Archive. Liverpool, England: Liverpool University Press. ISBN 978-1835537343.
- Fiotti, Francesco (7 May 2021). Kubrick e Caravaggio, sabotatori del reale [Kubrick and Caravaggio, Saboteurs of Reality] (in Italian). Milano, Italy: Mimesis. ISBN 978-8857575049.
- Fischer, Ralf Michael (2009). Raum und Zeit im filmischen Oeuvre von Stanley Kubrick [Space and Time in Stanley Kubrick's Cinematic Oeuvre] (in German). Berlin, Germany: Gebr. Mann. ISBN 978-3-7861-2598-3.
- Fraisse, Philippe (3 June 2010). Le cinéma au bord du monde : une approche de Stanley Kubrick [Cinema at the Edge of the World: An Approach to Stanley Kubrick] (in French). Paris, France: Gallimard. ISBN 978-2070126682.
- Gagliano, Maurizio (December 2009). La forma della visione nel cinema di Kubrick e altri saggi [The Shape of Vision in Stanley Kubrick's Cinema and Other Essays] (in Italian). Roma, Italy: Aracne. ISBN 978-8854830127.
- García Mainar, Luis M. (2000). Narrative and Stylistic Patterns in the Films of Stanley Kubrick. Rochester, N.Y.: Camden House. ISBN 978-1-57113-265-9.
- Gauthier, Brigitte, ed. (2012). Kubrick, les films [Kubrick: The Films] (in French). Paris, France: L'Entretemps. ISBN 978-2355391385.
- Ghezzi, Enrico (21 March 2007). Stanley Kubrick. Il Castoro Cinema (in Italian) (5th ed.). Milano, Italy: Il Castoro. ISBN 978-8880334170.
- Girardi, Bertrand (29 July 2011). L'imaginaire lumineux, un corps de l'image : entre fiction et documentaire – Le style lumineux chez S. Kubrick [The Luminous Imagination, a Body of Image: Between Fiction and Documentary – The Luminous Style of S. Kubrick] (in French). Saarbrücken, Germany: Editions universitaires europeennes. ISBN 978-6131589201.
- Giroldini, Primo, ed. (1998). A proposito di Stanley: Il cinema di Kubrick [On Stanley: Kubrick's Cinema]. Catalog of the Stanley Kubrick review "L'occhio e lo sguardo" (Parma, Italy, 16–26 February 1998) (in Italian). Parma, Italy: Effetto Notte.
- Giuliani, Pierre (1990). Stanley Kubrick (in French). Paris, France: Rivages. ISBN 978-2869302952.
- Guerra, Michele (2007). Il meccanismo indifferente: la concezione della storia nel cinema di Stanley Kubrick [The Indifferent Mechanism: The conception of History in the Cinema of Stanley Kubrick] (in Italian). Roma, Italy: Aracne. ISBN 978-8854809895.
- Hornick, Neil (30 April 2024). The Magic Eye: The Cinema of Stanley Kubrick. Foreword by Filippo Ulivieri. London, England: Sticking Place. ISBN 978-1942782513.
- Howard, James (1999). Stanley Kubrick Companion. London, England: Batsford. ISBN 978-0-7134-8487-8.
- Hughes, David (31 May 2013). The Complete Kubrick. London, England: Ebury. ISBN 978-1-4481-3321-5.
- Inoue, Yoshikazu (2022). Sutanri Kyuburikku eiga posuta-a-kai: senden posuta- made mo kontoro-rushita otoko スタンリー・キューブリック映画ポスター・アーカイヴ: 宣伝ポスターまでもコントロールした男 [Stanley Kubrick Film Poster Archives: The Man Who Controlled Even Advertising Posters] (in Japanese). Tokyo, Japan: DU. ISBN 978-4866471679.
- Jacke, Andreas (February 2009). Stanley Kubrick: eine Deutung der Konzepte seiner Filme [Stanley Kubrick: An Interpretation of the Concepts in His Films] (in German). Gießen, Germany: Psychosozial. ISBN 978-3-89806-856-7.
- Jameson, Fredric (4 March 1993). Signatures of the Visible. Abingdon-on-Thames, England: Routledge. ISBN 978-9048552825.
- Jansen, Peter W.; Schütte, Wolfram, eds. (1984). Stanley Kubrick. Reihe Film no. 18 (in German). München, Germany: Hanser. ISBN 978-3446126398.
- Jayamanne, Laleen (2021). Poetic Cinema and the Spirit of the Gift in the Films of Pabst, Parajanov, Kubrick, and Ruiz. Amsterdam, The Netherlands: Amsterdam University Press. ISBN 978-9048552825.
- Jenkins, Greg (1 January 1997). Stanley Kubrick and the Art of Adaptation: Three Novels, Three Films. Jefferson, N.C.: McFarland & Company. ISBN 978-0-7864-0281-6.
- Kagan, Norman (29 February 2000). The Cinema of Stanley Kubrick (3rd ed.). London, England: Bloomsbury. ISBN 978-0-8264-1243-0.
- Kaul, Susanne; Palmier, Jean-Pierre (1 September 2010). Stanley Kubrick: Einführung in Seine Filme und Filmästhetik [Stanley Kubrick: Introduction to His Films and Film Aesthetics] (in German). Paderborn, Germany: Fink Wilhelm. ISBN 978-3770547524.
- Keppler, Maja; Reichmann, Hans-Peter, eds. (2007). Stanley Kubrick (Catalog published to accompany the exhibition of the same name on 31 March–4 July 2004 at the Deutsches Filmmuseum in Frankfurt and on 20 January–18 April 2005 at the Martin-Gropius-Bau in Berlin, Germany) (2nd ed.). Frankfurt am Main, Germany: Deutsches Filmmuseum. ISBN 978-0367181420.
- Kilb, Andreas; Rother, Rainer, eds. (1999). Stanley Kubrick (in German). Berlin, Germany: Bertz. ISBN 978-3929470789.
- Kirchmann, Kay (1995). Stanley Kubrick: Das Schweigen der Bilder [Stanley Kubrick: The Silence of the Pictures] (in German) (2nd ed.). Berlin, Germany: Hitzeroth. ISBN 978-3896161963.
- Kolker, Robert (7 July 2011). A Cinema of Loneliness: Penn, Stone, Kubrick, Scorsese, Spielberg, Altman. New York, N.Y.: Oxford University Press. ISBN 978-0-19-973888-5.
- Kolker, Robert P. (30 November 2016). The Extraordinary Image: Orson Welles, Alfred Hitchcock, Stanley Kubrick, and the Reimagining of Cinema. New Brunswick, N.J.: Rutgers University Press. ISBN 978-0-19-973888-5.
- Kozłowski, Krzysztof (2013). Stanley Kubrick: filmowa polifonia sztuk [Stanley Kubrick: A Cinematic Polyphony of Arts] (in Polish). Warszawa, Poland: PWN. ISBN 978-8301173005.
- Krohn, Bill (2010). Stanley Kubrick. Masters of Cinema – Cahiers du Cinéma. New York, N.Y.: Phaidon. ISBN 978-2866425722.
- Kuberski, Philip (2012). Kubrick's Total Cinema: Philosophical Themes and Formal Qualities. London, England: Bloomsbury Academic. ISBN 978-1-4411-4956-5.
- Laborda Oribe, Lluís (26 November 2015). Kubrick en el laberinto: teoría y crítica de la obra de Stanley Kubrick [Kubrick in the Maze: Theory and Criticism of Stanley Kubrick's Oeuvre] (in Spanish). Madrid, Spain: Quarentena. ISBN 978-8416229277.
- Lasagna, Roberto (11 February 2015). Il mondo di Kubrick: cinema, estetica, filosofia [Kubrick's World: Cinema, Aesthetics, Philosophy] (in Italian). Milano, Italy: Mimesis. ISBN 978-8857526263.
- Lasagna, Roberto; Zumbo, Saverio (1997). I film di Stanley Kubrick [Stanley Kubrick's Films] (in Italian). Alessandria, Italy: Falsopiano. ISBN 978-8887011050.
- Léi, Yīng (2005). Sītǎnlì Kùbùlǐkè 斯坦利 库布里克 [Stanley Kubrick] (in Chinese). Shěnyáng, China: Liáoníng Měishù Chūbǎnshè. ISBN 978-7531432234.
- Lerose, Massimo (2011). Doppio Kubrick ...e se i suoi 13 film fossero in realtà uno solo? [Double Kubrick: What if His 13 Films Were Actually Only One Film?] (in Italian). Civitavecchia, Italy: Prospettiva. ISBN 978-8874187317.
- Magnisi, Davide; Costarella, Livio (September 2003). Gli orizzonti del cinema di Stanley Kubrick [The Horizons of Stanley Kubrick's Cinema] (in Italian). Bari, Italy: Adda. ISBN 978-8880824947.
- McEntee, Joy; Pezzotta, Elisa, eds. (28 March 2025). Kubrick and Race. Liverpool, England: Liverpool University Press. ISBN 978-1836243502.
- Naremore, James (2023). On Kubrick (Revised ed.). London, England: British Film Institute and Bloomsbury. ISBN 978-1-8390-2400-9.
- Nelissen, Ivo (1981). Stanley Kubrick: de hoop van een pessimist [Stanley Kubrick: A Pessimist's Hope] (in Dutch). Wetteren, Belgium: Universa. OCLC 9893744.
- Nelson, Thomas Allen (22 June 2000). Kubrick: Inside a Film Artist's Maze (New and expanded ed.). Bloomington, Ind.: Indiana University Press. ISBN 978-0253213907.
- Ovesen, Jörgen (2016). Pojken med de stora ögonen: Stanley Kubrick och hans filmer [The Boy with the Big Eyes: Stanley Kubrick and His Films] (in Swedish). Lidingö, Sweden: Fri Tanke. ISBN 978-9187935381.
- Pelzelmayer, Elise (9 June 2011). Das Schweigen als ästhetisch-dramaturgische Kategorie im Film: Eine analytische Betrachtung von Filmen der Regisseure Chaplin, Bergman, Hitchcock, Kubrick und Haneke [Silence as an Aesthetic-dramaturgical Category in Film: An Analytical Examination of Films by Directors Chaplin, Bergman, Hitchcock, Kubrick and Haneke] (in German). Rīga, Latvia: VDM Verlag Dr. Müller. ISBN 978-3639361049.
- Penzo, Giorgio; Penzo, Marco (3 April 2017). Stanley Kubrick (in Italian). Pistoia, Italy: Petite Plaisance. ISBN 978-8875881795.
- Peral, Sergio (26 April 2023). Kubrick total: cómo cambió el rumbo del cine de Hollywood [Total Kubrick: How He Changed the Trajectory of Hollywood Cinema] (in Spanish). Madrid, Spain: Sílex. ISBN 978-8418388835.
- Pérez Rufí, José Patricio (26 February 2014). Kubrick y el antihéroe: narrativa del personaje en el cine de Kubrick [Kubrick and the Antihero: Character Narrative in Kubrick's Cinema] (in Spanish). Rīga, Latvia: EAE Editorial Académica Española. ISBN 978-3847362692.
- Pezzotta, Elisa (25 July 2013). Stanley Kubrick: Adapting the Sublime. Jackson, Miss.: University Press of Mississippi. ISBN 978-1617038938.
- Pezzotta, Elisa (22 September 2022). The Prison of Time: Stanley Kubrick, Adrian Lyne, Michael Bay and Quentin Tarantino. London, England: Bloomsbury Academic. ISBN 978-1501380600.
- Phillips, Gene D. (1977). Stanley Kubrick: A Film Odyssey. New York, N.Y.: Popular Library. ISBN 978-0445041011.
- Phillips, Gene D.; Hill, Rodney (2002). The Encyclopedia of Stanley Kubrick. New York, N.Y.: Facts on File. ISBN 978-0816043880.
- Pierre, Arnauld (2010). Maternités cosmiques : la recherche des origines de Kupka à Kubrick [Cosmic Motherhoods: The Search for Origins, from Kupka to Kubrick] (in French). Paris, France: Hazan. ISBN 978-2754104555.
- Pili, Chiara (8 January 2020). Il cubo di Kubrick [Kubrick's Cube] (in Italian). Roma, Italy: Fondazione Mario Luzi. ISBN 978-8867482207.
- Pili, Giangiuseppe (8 January 2020). Anche Kant amava Arancia meccanica: la filosofia del cinema di Stanley Kubrick [Even Kant Loved A Clockwork Orange: The Philosophy of Stanley Kubrick's Cinema] (in Italian). Pistoia, Italy: Petite Plaisance. ISBN 978-8875882303.
- Polo, Juan Carlos (22 August 2016). Stanley Kubrick: la perfección obsesiva [Stanley Kubrick: An Obsessive Perfection] (in Spanish). Madrid, Spain: JC. ISBN 978-8415448167.
- Rambuss, Richard (2021). Kubrick's Men. New York, N.Y.: Fordham University Press. ISBN 978-0823293889.
- Rasmussen, Randy (28 February 2005). Stanley Kubrick: Seven Films Analyzed. Jefferson, N.C.: McFarland & Company. ISBN 978-0-7864-2152-7.
- Rebutto, Chiara (7 July 2021). Stanley Kubrick (EBook) (in Italian). København, Denmark: Saga Egmont. ISBN 978-8726970289.
- Rice, Julian (2008). Kubrick's Hope: Discovering Optimism from 2001 to Eyes Wide Shut. Lanham, Md.: Scarecrow. ISBN 978-0810862067.
- Ritzenhoff, Karen A.; Metlić, Dijana; Szaniawski, Jeremi, eds. (2023). Gender, Power, and Identity in the Films of Stanley Kubrick. Abingdon-on-Thames, England: Routledge. ISBN 978-1032072227.
- Rhodes, Gary Don (2008). Stanley Kubrick: Essays on his Films and Legacy. Jefferson, N.C.: McFarland & Company. ISBN 978-0-7864-3297-4.
- Sabino, Leonarda (13 December 2018). Stanley Kubrick: il malessere della società [Stanley Kubrick: The Malaise of Society] (in Italian). London, England: Edizioni Accademiche Italiane. ISBN 978-3639772272.
- Saponara, Gianni (19 May 2015). Il cinema sinestetico di Stanley Kubrick: percezione e comunicazione nell'opera d'arte totale [Stanley Kubrick's Synaesthetic Cinema Perception and Communication in the Total Work of Art] (in Italian). London, England: Edizioni Accademiche Italiane. ISBN 978-3639658651.
- Schäfer, Horst, ed. (1975). Materialien zu den Filmen von Stanley Kubrick, Eine Veranstaltung des Filmforum Duisburg im Rahmen der "Duisburger Woche", September 1975 [Materials for the Films of Stanley Kubrick, an Event Organized by the Filmforum Duisburg as Part of the "Duisburg Week", September 1975] (in German). OCLC 219895430.
- Seesslen, Georg; Jung, Fernand (2008). Stanley Kubrick und seine Filme [Stanley Kubrick and His Films] (in German). Marburg, Germany: Schüren. ISBN 978-3894723125.
- Snider, S. William (17 April 2024). The Minotaur: A Kubrick Odyssey. Independently published. ISBN 979-8320911878.
- Sogni, Laura; Brivio, Lara, eds. (1999). Stanley Kubrick (in Italian). Roma, Italy: Audino. ISBN 88-86350-53-8.
- Sperb, Jason (2006). The Kubrick Facade: Faces and Voices in the Films of Stanley Kubrick. Lanham, Md.: Scarecrow. ISBN 978-0-8108-5855-8.
- Szaniawski, Jeremi, ed. (20 February 2020). After Kubrick: A Filmmaker's Legacy. London, England: Bloomsbury Academic. ISBN 978-1501347641.
- Tatsumi, Takayuki (1999). Sutanri Kyuburikku スタンリー・キューブリック [Stanley Kubrick] (in Japanese). Tokyo, Japan: Kinema Junpōsha. ISBN 978-4873765211.
- Thissen, Rolf (1999). Stanley Kubrick: der Regisseur als Architekt [Stanley Kubrick: The Director as Architect] (in German). München, Germany: Heyne. ISBN 978-3453164956.
- Toffetti, Sergio (1978). Stanley Kubrick (in Italian). Milano, Italy: Moizzi. OCLC 7171787.
- Vidal, Jordi (26 April 2005). Traité de combat moderne : films et fictions de Stanley Kubrick [Treaty on Modern Combat: Stanley Kubrick Films and Fictions] (in French). Paris, France: Allia. ISBN 978-2844851796.
- Wade, Chris (21 December 2019). Stanley Kubrick On Screen. Morrisville, N.C.: Lulu. ISBN 978-0244846954.
- Walker, Alexander (1 January 1972). Stanley Kubrick Directs (Expanded ed.). San Diego, Cal.: Harcourt Brace Jovanovich. ISBN 978-0156848923.
- Walker, Alexander; Taylor, Sybil; Ruchti, Ulrich (1 September 1999). Stanley Kubrick, Director: A Visual Analysis (Revised and enlarged ed.). New York, N.Y.: W. W. Norton & Company. ISBN 978-0393046014.
- Webster, Patrick (21 December 2010). Love and Death in Kubrick: A Critical Study of the Films from Lolita Through Eyes Wide Shut. Jefferson, N.C.: McFarland & Company. ISBN 978-0-7864-6191-2.
- Würth, Andrea (14 April 2014). Darstellung und Funktion künstlicher Intelligenzen im Kubrick'schen Filmkosmos [Representation and Function of Artificial Intelligence in Kubrick's Film Cosmos] (in German). München, Germany: Grin. ISBN 978-3656636250.
- Zhu, Yeqi (2022). Yù yán zhī jìng: Sītǎnlì Kùbùlǐkè diàn yǐng gǎi biān yán jiū 寓言之境: 斯坦利·库布里克电影改编研究 [The Realm of Allegory: A Study of Stanley Kubrick's Film Adaptations] (in Chinese). Shànghǎi, China: Fùdàn dà xué chū bǎn shè. ISBN 978-7309163940.
- Zagarrio, Vito (2006). Overlooking Kubrick: la storia, la messa in scena, lo sguardo, il montaggio, la psiche [Overlooking Kubrick: The Story, the Staging, the Gaze, the Editing, the Psyche] (in Italian). Roma, Italy: Audino. ISBN 978-8875271312.
- Zagarrio, Vito, ed. (2020). Per Kubrick: dodici sguardi critici [For Kubrick: Twelve Critical Looks] (in Italian). Roma, Italy: Audino. ISBN 978-8875274603.
- Zumbo, Saverio (10 May 2018). La trappola del testo: sul primo Kubrick [The Text Trap: On Early Kubrick] (in Italian). Milano, Italy: Mimesis. ISBN 978-8857548883.

== Use of music ==
- Akashi, Masanori (14 July 2007). Kyuburikku eiga no ongakuteki sekai キューブリック映画の音楽的世界 [The Musical World of Kubrick's Films] (in Japanese). Tokyo, Japan: Arufabēta. ISBN 978-4871985499.
- Bassetti, Sergio (2002). La musica secondo Kubrick [Music According to Kubrick] (in Italian). Torino, Italy: Lindau. ISBN 978-8871803265.
- Bodde, Gerrit (2002). Die Musik in den Filmen von Stanley Kubrick [The Music in Stanley Kubrick's Films] (in German). Uelvesbüll, Germany: Der Andere Verlag. ISBN 978-3936231359.
- Gauthier, Brigitte, ed. (2012). Kubrick, les musiques [Kubrick: The Music] (in French). Paris, France: L'Entretemps. ISBN 978-2355391491.
- Gengaro, Christine Lee (1 November 2012). Listening to Stanley Kubrick: The Music in His Films. Lanham, Md.: Rowman & Littlefield. ISBN 978-0-8108-8564-6.
- McQuiston, Kate (December 2013). We'll Meet Again: Musical Design in the Films of Stanley Kubrick. Oxford, England: Oxford University Press. ISBN 978-0-19-976766-3.
- Moliterni, Pierfranco, ed. (2000). La musica nei film di Kubrick [Music in Kubrick's Films] (in Italian). Bari, Italy: B.A. Graphis. OCLC 44745719.
- Morelli, Giovanni (2011). Prima la musica, poi il cinema: quasi una sonata – Bresson, Kubrick, Fellini, Gaál [First Music, Then Cinema: Almost a Sonata – Bresson, Kubrick, Fellini, Gaál] (in Italian). Venezia, Italy: Marsilio. ISBN 978-8831708517.
- Pecqueur, Antoine (March 2007). Les écrans sonores de Stanley Kubrick [Stanley Kubrick's Sound Screens] (in French). Québec, QC: !. ISBN 978-2916347042.
- Sanvoisin, Rémy (2014). Kubrick et la musique [Kubrick and Music] (in French). Paris, France: Vrin. ISBN 978-2711625567.
- Sperl, Stephan (11 September 2006). Die Semantisierung der Musik im filmischen Werk Stanley Kubricks [The Semantization of Music in Stanley Kubrick's Films] (in German). Würzburg, Germany: Königshausen & Neumann. ISBN 978-3-8260-3408-4.

== On individual films ==
=== Killer's Kiss (1955) ===
- Koszarski, Richard (13 July 2021). "Keep 'Em in the East": Kazan, Kubrick, and the Postwar New York Film Renaissance. New York, N.Y.: Columbia University Press. ISBN 978-0231200998.

=== The Killing (1956) ===
- Curti, Roberto (2007). Stanley Kubrick: Rapina a mano armata [Stanley Kubrick: The Killing] (in Italian). Torino, Italy: Lindau. ISBN 978-8871806174.
- Ortmann, David (12 June 2018). Der Film Noir: inhaltliche Parallelen von Stanley Kubricks The Killing und John Hustons The Asphalt Jungle [Film Noir: Thematic Parallels Between Stanley Kubrick's The Killing and John Huston's The Asphalt Jungle] (in German). München, Germany: Grin. ISBN 978-3668707658.

=== Paths of Glory (1957) ===
- Descourvières, Benedikt (May 2002). Kriegs-Schnitte: Wege zum Ruhm, Full Metal Jacket und Independence Day im Deutschunterricht [War Cuts: Paths of Glory, Full Metal Jacket and Independence Day in German Lessons] (in German). St. Augustin, Germany: Gardez!. ISBN 978-3897960787.
- Fink, Guido (November 1971). Orizzonti di gloria: un film di Stanley Kubrick [Paths of Glory: A Stanley Kubrick Film] (in Italian). Padova, Italy: R.A.D.A.R. OCLC 711342463.

=== Spartacus (1960) ===
- Douglas, Kirk (12 June 2012). I Am Spartacus!: Making a Film, Breaking the Blacklist. Foreword by George Clooney. New York, N.Y.: Open Road Media. ISBN 978-1453254806.
- Winkler, Martin M., ed. (2008). Spartacus: Film and History. Hoboken, N.J.: Blackwell. ISBN 978-0-470-77726-8.
- Zemon Davis, Natalie (2000). Slaves on Screen: Film and Historical Vision. Toronto, ON: Vintage. ISBN 978-0679310235.

=== Lolita (1962) ===
- Appel, Alfred, Jr. (7 November 1974). Nabokov's Dark Cinema. Oxford, England: Oxford University Press. ISBN 978-0195018349.
- Araújo Batista, Fernanda Cristina (17 September 2014). Lolita de Ramsdale x Lolitas de Hollywood: uma análise do romance de Vladimir Nabokov e das adaptações fílmicas de Stanley Kubrick e Adrian Lyne [Lolita of Ramsdale vs. Lolitas of Hollywood: An Analysis of the Vladimir Nabokov Novel and the Film Adaptations by Stanley Kubrick and Adrian Lyne] (in Portuguese). London, England: Novas Edições Acadêmicas. ISBN 978-3639688283.
- Corliss, Richard (27 December 1994). Lolita. BFI Film Classics. London, England: British Film Institute. ISBN 978-0851703688.
- Machu, Didier; Tuhkunen, Taïna (26 August 2009). Lolita, roman de Vladimir Nabokov (1955) et film de Stanley Kubrick (1962) [Lolita: Novel by Vladimir Nabokov (1955) and Film by Stanley Kubrick (1962)] (in French). Paris, France: Ellipses. ISBN 978-2729852863.
- Marcucci, Sara (November 1999). Lolita, analisi di un'ossessione [Lolita, Analysis of an Obsession] (in Italian). Roma, Italy: Bulzoni. ISBN 978-8883193507.
- Martiny, Erik (12 November 2009). Lolita: From Nabokov to Kubrick and Lyne. Paris, France: CDU Sedes. ISBN 978-2301000590.
- Nabokov, Vladimir (26 August 1997). Lolita: A Screenplay. New York, N.Y.: Vintage. ISBN 978-0679772552.
- Pilińska, Anna (10 September 2015). Lolita Between Adaptation and Interpretation: From Nabokov's Novel and Screenplay to Kubrick's Film. Newcastle upon Tyne, England: Cambridge Scholars. ISBN 978-1443880497.
- Schulze, Kerstin (10 May 2011). A Novel and Its Adaptation: Stanley Kubrick – Lolita (1962). München, Germany: Grin. ISBN 978-3-640-91182-0.

=== Dr. Strangelove or: How I Learned to Stop Worrying and Love the Bomb (1964) ===
- Broderick, Mick (3 January 2017). Reconstructing Strangelove: Inside Stanley Kubrick's "Nightmare Comedy". London, England: Wallflower. ISBN 978-0231177092.
- Case, George (21 August 2014). Calling Dr. Strangelove: The Anatomy and Influence of the Kubrick Masterpiece. Jefferson, N.C.: McFarland & Company. ISBN 978-0786494491.
- Henriksen, Margot A. (28 October 1997). Dr. Strangelove's America: Society and Culture in the Atomic Age. Berkeley, Cal.: University of California Press. ISBN 978-0520083103.
- Krämer, Peter (14 November 2014). Dr. Strangelove or: How I Learned to Stop Worrying and Love the Bomb. BFI Film Classics. London, England: British Film Institute. ISBN 978-1844577781.

=== 2001: A Space Odyssey (1968) ===
- Vv.Aa. (1 February 2011). 2001 : l'Odyssée de l'espace : un film de Stanley Kubrick – Dossier sur le film et le réalisateur – Decoupage intégral et dialogues anglais [2001: A Space Odyssey: A Stanley Kubrick Film – File on the Film and the Director – Full Breakdown and English Dialog]. Avant-Scène Cinéma no. 580 (in French). Paris, France: Alice. ISBN 978-0968768709.
- Agel, Jerome, ed. (April 1970). The Making of Kubrick's 2001. New York, N.Y.: New American Library.
- Becke, Jennifer (8 October 2014). Die Ästhetik im modernen Science Fiction Film in 2001: Odysee im Weltraum von Stanley Kubrick [The Aesthetics in Modern Science Fiction Film in Stanley Kubrick's 2001: A Space Odyssey] (in German). München, Germany: Grin. ISBN 978-3656764830.
- Beckendorf, Ralf (30 April 2010). Raum und Raumerfahrung im Film: am Beispiel von Stanley Kubrick's 2001: A Space Odyssey [Space and Spatial Experience in Film: The Example of Stanley Kubrick's 2001: A Space Odyssey] (in German). München, Germany: Grin. ISBN 978-3640605958.
- Benson, Michael (April 2018). Space Odyssey: Stanley Kubrick, Arthur C. Clarke, and the Making of a Masterpiece. New York, N.Y.: Simon & Schuster. ISBN 978-1-5011-6395-1.
- Bertrand, Jean-Michel (2006). 2001, l'odyssée de l'espace : puissance de l'énigme [2001: A Space Odyssey: Power of the Enigma] (in French). Paris, France: L'Harmattan. ISBN 978-2296000957.
- Bizony, Piers (2000). 2001: Filming the future (Revised ed.). London, England: Aurum. ISBN 978-1854103659.
- Bizony, Piers (23 September 2015). The Making of Stanley Kubrick's 2001: A Space Odyssey. Köln, Germany: Taschen. ISBN 978-3836559546.
- Bullard, Galen (1 September 2001). Kubrick's Prophecy: A Guide to the Insights of 2001: A Space Odyssey. Calgary, AB: Starling Wavefront. ISBN 978-0968768709.
- Chion, Michel (2001). Kubrick's Cinema Odyssey. London, England: British Film Institute. ISBN 978-0-85170-839-3.
- Ciment, Michel, ed. (2020). L'Odyssée de 2001 suivi de Entretien avec Stanley Kubrick [The Odyssey of 2001, Followed by Interview with Stanley Kubrick] (in French). Arles and Lyon, France: Actes Sud and Institut Lumière. ISBN 978-2-330-11391-9.
- Clarke, Arthur C. (1972). The Lost Worlds of 2001. New York, N.Y.: New American Library. ISBN 978-0451125361.
- Dalla Gassa, Marco; Gregori, Flavio, eds. (16 September 2021). Stanley Kubrick: 2001: odissea nello spazio – Percorsi dentro, attorno e oltre il film [Stanley Kubrick: 2001: A Space Odyssey – Journeys Inside, Around and Beyond the Film] (in Italian). Foreword by Michel Chion. Parma, Italy: Diabasis. ISBN 978-1904027454.
- Dumont, Jean-Paul; Monod, Jean (1970). Le foetus astral [The Space Fetus] (in French). Paris, France: Christian Bourgois. OCLC 164541915.
- Fenwick, James, ed. (2020). Understanding Kubrick's 2001: A Space Odyssey: Representation and Interpretation. Bristol, England: Intellect. ISBN 978-1789382129.
- Frewin, Anthony, ed. (2005). Are We Alone?: The Stanley Kubrick Extraterrestrial Intelligence Interviews. London, England: Elliott & Thompson. ISBN 978-1904027454.
- Frinzi, Joe R. (24 July 2017). Kubrick's Monolith: The Art and Mystery of 2001: A Space Odyssey. Jefferson, N.C.: McFarland & Company. ISBN 978-1476664422.
- Grande, Mariacristina (27 December 2021). Un'odissea moderna tra letteratura e cinema: il mito di Ulisse in Joyce e Kubrick [A Modern Odyssey Across Literature and Cinema: The Myth of Ulysses in Joyce and Kubrick] (in Italian). Roma, Italy: Stamen. ISBN 978-8831928847.
- Halstead, Albert (28 January 2019). Kubrick's 2001: A Space Odyssey: How Patterns, Archetypes and Style Inform a Narrative (EBook). Pennsauken, N.J.: BookBaby. ISBN 978-1543956863.
- Jaumont, Fabrice (8 October 2018). Stanley Kubrick: The Odysseys. New York, N.Y.: Books We Live By. ISBN 978-1628480795.
- Kapferer, Bruce (15 April 2014). 2001 and Counting: Kubrick, Nietzsche, and Anthropology. Chicago, Ill.: Prickly Paradigm. ISBN 978-0984201051.
- Kolker, Robert (24 February 2006). Stanley Kubrick's 2001: A Space Odyssey: New Essays. Oxford, England: Oxford University Press. ISBN 978-0-19-972436-9.
- Kromer, Stephanie (19 November 2011). Die Rolle der Musik in Stanley Kubrick's 2001: Odyssee im Weltraum [The Role of Music in Stanley Kubrick's 2001: A Space Odyssey] (in German). München, Germany: Grin. ISBN 978-3656058946.
- Lasagna, Roberto (15 March 2018). 2001: odissea nello spazio di Stanley Kubrick [Stanley Kubrick's 2001: A Space Odyssey] (in Italian). Roma, Italy: Gremese. ISBN 978-8884409966.
- Lippi, Giuseppe (15 May 2014). 2001: odissea nello spazio: dizionario ragionato [2001: A Space Odyssey: Reasoned Dictionary] (in Italian). Genova, Italy: Le Mani. ISBN 978-8880124474.
- Miller, Blair (21 February 2022). Space/Self/World: Space and Identity in Kubrick's 2001: A Space Odyssey. New York, N.Y.: DIO. ISBN 978-1645042167.
- Palumbo, Giuseppe (30 December 2019). 2001: odissea nello spazio: la svolta [2001: A Space Odyssey: The Turning Point] (in Italian). Sesto Calende, Italy: TraccePerLaMeta. ISBN 978-8885566491.
- Plotke, Olaf (7 October 2010). Die Figuration des Sternenkinds in 2001: Odyssee im Weltraum von Stanley Kubrick und Arthur C. Clarke [The Figuration of the Star Child in 2001: A Space Odyssey by Stanley Kubrick and Arthur C. Clarke] (in German). München, Germany: Grin. ISBN 978-3640716760.
- Richter, Dan (25 July 2002). Moonwatcher's Memoir: A Diary of 2001: A Space Odyssey. Foreword by Arthur C. Clarke. New York, N.Y.: Carroll & Graf. ISBN 978-0786710737.
- Schwam, Stephanie, ed. (7 March 2000). The Making of 2001, A Space Odyssey. New York, N.Y.: Modern Library. ISBN 978-0375755286.
- Seibold, Alexander (1997). Cinema metamythologica: filmanalytische und theologische Bemerkungen zu 2001: A Space Odyssey von Stanley Kubrick [Cinema Metamythology: Film Analysis and Theological Remarks on 2001: A Space Odyssey by Stanley Kubrick] (in German). Altenberge, Germany: Oros. ISBN 978-3-89375-140-2.
- Stelzer, Philipp (2022). Anfänge der Globalisierung: Macht und Mythos in Epischen Anfangskonstruktionen Bei Ovid, Milton und Kubrick [Beginnings of Globalization: Power and Myth in Epic Initial Constructions in Ovid, Milton and Kubrick] (in German). Leiden, The Netherlands: Brill. ISBN 978-3846767320.
- Stork, David G., ed. (6 February 1998). HAL's Legacy: 2001's Computer as Dream and Reality. Cambridge, Mass.: MIT Press. ISBN 978-0262692113.
- Ulivieri, Filippo; Odino, Simone (4 June 2019). 2001 tra Kubrick e Clarke: genesi, realizzazione e paternità di un capolavoro [2001 Between Kubrick and Clarke: The Genesis, Making and Authorship of a Masterpiece] (in Italian). Loreto, Italy: StreetLib. ISBN 978-8834128497.
- Walter, Stephan (2002). 2001: Mythos und Science im Cinema [2001: Myth and Science in Cinema] (in German). Norderstedt, Germany: Books on Demand. ISBN 978-3935581219.
- Wheat, Leonard F. (21 June 2000). Kubrick's 2001: A Triple Allegory. Lanham, Md.: Scarecrow. ISBN 978-1-4616-6023-1.

=== A Clockwork Orange (1971) ===
- Bailey, Andrew; Houston, Penelope; Strick, Philip (31 March 2007). Stanley Kubrick's A Clockwork Orange (One book, one DVD and one foldable poster). Köln, Germany: Taschen. ISBN 978-3836577267.
- Beccone, Simona (December 2010). A Clockwork Orange: l'arte come ultra-violenza [A Clockwork Orange: Art as Ultra-violence] (in Italian). Roma, Italy: Aracne. ISBN 978-8854836570.
- Böttcher, Heiko (31 March 2007). The Metamorphosis of Alex in Stanley Kubrick's Clockwork Orange from a Viewpoint of Abnormal Psychology. München, Germany: Grin. ISBN 978-3-638-63109-9.
- Cremonini, Giorgio (2006). Stanley Kubrick: L'Arancia meccanica [Stanley Kubrick: A Clockwork Orange] (in Italian) (6th ed.). Torino, Italy: Lindau. ISBN 978-8871806051.
- Fenwick, James (3 August 2018). Gale Researcher Guide for A Clockwork Orange: Anthony Burgess's Black Comedy (1962) and Stanley Kubrick's Violent Grotesque (1971) (EBook). Farmington Hills, Mich.: Gale. ISBN 978-3-638-63109-9.
- Granato, Massimiliano (23 May 2023). Arancia meccanica di Stanley Kubrick: tra illusioni sociali e rieducazione mancata [Stanley Kubrick's A Clockwork Orange: Between Social Illusions and Failed Reeducation] (in Italian). Sassari, Italy: Catartica. ISBN 979-1281401037.
- Gregori, Flavio, ed. (June 2004). Singin' in the Brain: Il mondo distopico di A Clockwork Orange – Atti del convegno svolto presso il Dipartimento di Studi linguistici e letterari europei e postcoloniali dell'Università Ca' Foscari di Venezia e l'Ufficio Attività cinematografiche del Comune di Venezia [Singin' in the Brain: The Dystopian World of A Clockwork Orange – Proceedings of the Conference Held at the Department of European and Postcolonial Linguistic and Literary Studies of the Ca' Foscari University of Venice and the Office for Film Activities of the Municipality of Venice] (in Italian). Torino, Italy: Lindau. ISBN 88-7180-506-2.
- Groß, Jens-Florian; Bauer, Miriam (5 March 2008). Mode, Masken und Kleidung in A Clockwork Orange von Stanley Kubrick [Fashion, Masks and Clothing in Stanley Kubrick's A Clockwork Orange] (in German). München, Germany: Grin. ISBN 978-3638919265.
- Grossini, Giancarlo (2 September 2022). Il cubo di Kubrick: Arancia meccanica 50 anni dopo e per sempre [Kubrick's Cube: A Clockwork Orange 50 Years On and Forever] (in Italian). Milano, Italy: Bietti. ISBN 978-8882485054.
- von der Heide, Thomas (1 June 2006). A Clockwork Orange: The Presentation and the Impact of Violence in the Novel and in the Film. München, Germany: Grin. ISBN 978-3-638-50681-6.
- Ingham, Tom (18 December 2002). A Clockwork Orange: Kubrick's Practice Examined. London, England: Kaplan. ISBN 978-3-638-50681-6.
- Kaczmarkiewicz, Christof (16 October 2010). Die Droogs: eine typische Peergroup? Untersuchung des Films A Clockwork Orange von Stanley Kubrick [The Droogs: A Typical Peer Group? Examination of the Film A Clockwork Orange by Stanley Kubrick] (in German). München, Germany: Grin. ISBN 978-3640723140.
- Kubrick, Stanley; Burgess, Anthony (2000). Stanley Kubrick's A Clockwork Orange: Based on the Novel by Anthony Burgess. Southwold, England: ScreenPress. ISBN 978-1-901680-47-8.
- Marrone, Gianfranco (2005). La Cura Ludovico: sofferenze e beatitudini di un corpo sociale [The Ludovico Treatment: Sufferings and Pleasures of a Social Body] (in Italian). Torino, Italy: Einaudi. ISBN 978-8806167530.
- McDougal, Stuart Y. (7 July 2003). Stanley Kubrick's A Clockwork Orange. Cambridge, England: Cambridge University Press. ISBN 978-0-521-57488-4.
- Melia, Matthew; Orgill, Georgina, eds. (2023). Anthony Burgess, Stanley Kubrick and A Clockwork Orange. London, England: Palgrave Macmillan. ISBN 978-3031055980.
- Moscati, Mario (17 October 2018). Arancia meccanica: Quarant'anni ma non li dimostra [A Clockwork Orange: 40 Years Old but It Does Not Show Its Age] (in Italian). Roma, Italy: ilmiolibro. ISBN 978-8892350298.
- Schill, Oliver (14 January 2004). The Expressionistic Style and the Theatricality in Stanley Kubrick's A Clockwork Orange (1971). München, Germany: Grin. ISBN 978-3-638-24523-4.
- Volkmann, Maren (16 October 2006). A Clockwork Orange in the Context of Subculture. München, Germany: Grin. ISBN 978-3-638-55498-5.

=== Barry Lyndon (1975) ===
- Cocchi, Paolo (27 September 2009). Musica e immagine in Barry Lyndon di Stanley Kubrick [Music and Image in Stanley Kubrick's Barry Lyndon] (in Italian). Morrisville, N.C.: Lulu. ISBN 978-1445202754.
- Cremonini, Giorgio (June 2012). Barry Lyndon (in Italian). Palermo, Italy: L'Epos. ISBN 978-8883024276.
- Magnisi, Davide (10 June 2022). Barry Lyndon di Stanley Kubrick [Stanley Kubrick's Barry Lyndon] (in Italian). Roma, Italy: Gremese. ISBN 978-8866921257.
- Pilard, Philippe (1990). Barry Lyndon : Stanley Kubrick (in French). Paris, France: Nathan. ISBN 978-2091886268.
- Pramaggiore, Maria (2020). Making Time in Stanley Kubrick's Barry Lyndon: Art, History and Empire. London, England: Bloomsbury Academic. ISBN 978-1501300318.
- Webster, Patrick (15 April 2024). The Genius of Barry Lyndon: Factual and Theoretical Approaches to Kubrick's Masterpiece. Jefferson, N.C.: McFarland & Company. ISBN 978-1476689975.

=== The Shining (1980) ===
- Vv.Aa. (10 January 2020). The Shining (El Resplandor) (in Spanish). Málaga, Spain: Cult Books. ISBN 978-8809776661.
- Carosso, Marco (2006). Stanley Kubrick's Shining (in Italian). Alessandria, Italy: Falsopiano. ISBN 978-8889782040.
- Cremonini, Giorgio (1999). Stanley Kubrick: Shining [Stanley Kubrick: The Shining] (in Italian). Torino, Italy: Lindau. ISBN 978-8867086887.
- Della Gatta, Eleonora (2 July 2020). The Shining di Stanley Kubrick: un'analisi del film [Stanley Kubrick's The Shining: A Film Analysis] (in Italian). Martina Franca, Italy: PubMe. ISBN 978-8833665641.
- Gnocchi, Alessandro (18 March 2015). I segreti di Shining: King contro Kubrick [The Secrets of The Shining: King Against Kubrick] (in Italian). Siena, Italy: Barney. ISBN 978-8898693450.
- Goliot-Lété, Anne (3 July 2020). Shining de Stanley Kubrick : dans le labyrinthe [Stanley Kubrick's The Shining: Inside the Maze] (in French). Bordeaux, France: Le Bord de l'eau. ISBN 978-2356876126.
- Lardín, Rubén (1998). El resplandor: la ola de terror que barrió América [The Shining: The Terror Wave That Swept America] (in Spanish). Valencia, Spain: Midons. ISBN 978-8460549468.
- Luckhurst, Roger (2013). The Shining. BFI Film Classics. London, England: British Film Institute. ISBN 978-1844576395.
- Mee, Laura (28 September 2017). The Shining. Devil's Advocates. Liverpool, England: Liverpool University Press. ISBN 978-1911325444.
- Merced, Matthew (11 May 2020). Kubrick's Labyrinth: The Psychology of The Shining. Independently published. ISBN 979-8633132823.
- Oldham, Craig (15 October 2022). The Shining: A Visual and Cultural Haunting. London, England: Rough Trade. ISBN 978-1914236167.
- Olson, Danel, ed. (2015). Stanley Kubrick's The Shining: Studies in the Horror Film. Lakewood, Colo.: Centipede. ISBN 978-1613470695.
- Rinzler, J.W. (15 December 2024). Unkrich, Lee (ed.). Stanley Kubrick's The Shining. Köln, Germany: Taschen. ISBN 978-3754400036.
- Rosato, Angelo (5 August 2016). The Overlook Hotel in Stanley Kubrick's The Shining. München, Germany: Grin. ISBN 978-3668221239.
- Roy, Simon (23 December 2016). Kubrick Red. Translated by Homel, Jacob. Vancouver, BC: Anvil Press. ISBN 978-1772140729.
- Wade, Chris (14 September 2018). Stanley Kubrick's The Shining. Classic Film Series. Morrisville, N.C.: Lulu. ISBN 978-0244416003.

=== Full Metal Jacket (1987) ===
- Descourvières, Benedikt (May 2002). Kriegs-Schnitte: Wege zum Ruhm, Full Metal Jacket und Independence Day im Deutschunterricht [War Cuts: Paths of Glory, Full Metal Jacket and Independence Day in German Lessons] (in German). St. Augustin, Germany: Gardez!. ISBN 978-3897960787.
- Menarini, Roy; Bisoni, Claudio (2010). Stanley Kubrick: Full Metal Jacket (in Italian). Torino, Italy: Lindau. ISBN 978-8871808482.
- Modine, Matthew (25 October 2005). Full Metal Jacket Diary. New York, N.Y.: Rugged Land. ISBN 9781590710470.
- Spieß, Patrick (30 December 2013). Stanley Kubrick's Full Metal Jacket: Portrayal of the Vietnam War. München, Germany: Grin. ISBN 978-3656564300.

=== Eyes Wide Shut (1999) ===
- Abrams, Nathan; Orgill, Georgina, eds. (2023). Eyes Wide Shut: Behind Stanley Kubrick's Masterpiece. Liverpool, England: Liverpool University Press. ISBN 978-1-83764-515-2.
- Althaus, Benjamin (18 November 2004). Communication in Stanley Kubrick's Eyes Wide Shut. München, Germany: Grin. ISBN 978-3-638-32589-9.
- Berkowicz, Alexia; Martens, Irja (17 July 2007). Arthur Schnitzler Traumnovelle vs Stanley Kubrick Eyes Wide Shut: ein Vergleich [Arthur Schnitzler's Traumnovelle vs Stanley Kubrick's Eyes Wide Shut: A Comparison] (in German). München, Germany: Grin. ISBN 978-3638656276.
- Cantisani, Ludovico (27 July 2021). Viaggio al termine del Novecento: Eyes Wide Shut di Stanley Kubrick [Journey to the End of the 20th Century: Stanley Kubrick's Eyes Wide Shut] (in Italian). Palermo, Italy: Accademia del Cinema Ares. ISBN 979-1220091480.
- Ciaruffoli, Simone (2003). Stanley Kubrick: Eyes Wide Shut (in Italian). Alessandria, Italy: Falsopiano. ISBN 978-8887011593.
- Cadieux, Axel (24 October 2019). Le dernier rêve de Stanley Kubrick : enquête sur Eyes Wide Shut [Stanley Kubrick's Final Dream: A Study on Eyes Wide Shut] (in French). Nantes, France: Capricci. ISBN 979-1023903430.
- Chion, Michel (27 February 2008). Eyes Wide Shut. BFI Modern Classics. London, England: British Film Institute. ISBN 978-0851709321.
- Cimmino, Luigi; Dottorini, Daniele; Pangaro, Giorgio, eds. (29 June 2017). Il doppio sogno di Stanley Kubrick: dalla Traumnovelle ad Eyes Wide Shut [Stanley Kubrick's Double Dream: From Traumnovelle to Eyes Wide Shut] (in Italian). Soveria Mannelli, Italy: Rubbettino. ISBN 978-8849850710.
- Dulabic, Suzana (25 January 2004). Stanley Kubrick: Eyes Wide Shut (EBook) (in German). München, Germany: Grin. ISBN 978-3638343596.
- Freytag, Julia (2007). Verhüllte Schaulust: Die Maske in Schnitzlers Traumnovelle und in Kubricks Eyes Wide Shut [Veiled Curiosity: The Mask in Schnitzler's Dream Story and in Kubrick's Eyes Wide Shut] (in German). Bielefeld, Germany: Transcript. ISBN 978-3899424256.
- Hebestreit, Melanie (26 October 2013). Paradigmatische Filmstrukturen: eine Strukturanalyse des Werkes Eyes Wide Shut von Stanley Kubrick [Paradigmatic Film Structures: A Structural Analysis of Stanley Kubrick's Eyes Wide Shut] (in German). Rīga, Latvia: VDM Verlag Dr. Müller. ISBN 978-3639064087.
- Heinemann, Carlotta (8 April 2011). Vergleich zwischen dem Buch Traumnovelle von Arthur Schnitzler und dem daran angelehnten Film Eyes Wide Shut von Stanley Kubrick [Comparison Between the Book Dream Story by Arthur Schnitzler and the Film Eyes Wide Shut by Stanley Kubrick] (in German). München, Germany: Grin. ISBN 978-3640887033.
- Kolker, Robert P.; Abrams, Nathan (June 2019). Eyes Wide Shut: Stanley Kubrick and the Making of His Final Film. Oxford, England: Oxford University Press. ISBN 978-0190678036.
- Kubrick, Stanley; Raphael, Frederic; Schnitzler, Arthur (1999). Eyes Wide Shut / "Traumnovelle" [Eyes Wide Shut / "Dream Story"] (in German). Frankfurt am Main, Germany: Fischer Taschenbuch. ISBN 978-3596143696.
- Morel, Diane (2002). Eyes wide shut, de Stanley Kubrick ou L'étrange labyrinthe [Stanley Kubrick's Eyes Wide Shut, or The Strange Labyrinth] (in French). Paris, France: PUF. ISBN 978-2130527794.
- Raphael, Frederic (31 August 1999). Eyes Wide Open: A Memoir of Stanley Kubrick. New York, N.Y.: Ballantine. ISBN 9780345437761.
- Ruwe, Carolin (November 2007). Symbols in Stanley Kubrick's Movie Eyes Wide Shut. München, Germany: Grin. ISBN 978-3-638-84176-4.
- Schillerhof, Tom (27 August 2013). Jack und Jess gehen ins Kino: Eyes Wide Shut von Stanley Kubrick [Jack and Jess Go to the Movies: Stanley Kubrick's Eyes Wide Shut] (EBook) (in German). München, Germany: BookRix. ISBN 978-3730959725.
- Suciu, Johannes (12 May 2008). Kubrick Dechiffrieren: eine objektiv hermeneutische Analyse von Eyes Wide Shut [Deciphering Kubrick: An Objective Hermeneutic Analysis of Eyes Wide Shut] (in German). Rīga, Latvia: VDM Verlag Dr. Müller. ISBN 978-3730959725.

== On unrealized projects ==
=== Napoleon ===
- Castle, Alison, ed. (2009). Stanley Kubrick's Napoleon: The Greatest Movie Never Made. Köln, Germany: Taschen. ISBN 978-3836568890.
- Weiand, Andreas (1 April 2014). Napoleon: der nie gedrehte Film von Stanley Kubrick – Nach welchen objektiven Kriterien wird Publikumserfolg vorhergesagt? [Napoleon: Unmade Stanley Kubrick Film – What Objective Criteria Are Used to Predict Audience Success?] (in German). Saarbrücken, Germany: AV Akademikerverlag. ISBN 978-3639627077.

=== A.I. Artificial Intelligence (Note: A.I. was eventually directed by Steven Spielberg after Kubrick handed him the project during development. It was released in 2001.) ===
- Harlan, Jan; Struthers, Jane M. (2009). A.I. Artificial Intelligence: From Stanley Kubrick to Steven Spielberg – The Vision Behind the Film. London, England: Thames & Hudson. ISBN 978-0-500-51489-4.
- Rice, Julian (2017). Kubrick's Story, Spielberg's Film: A.I. Artificial Intelligence. Lanham, Md.: Rowman & Littlefield. ISBN 978-1442278189.

== On Kubrick as a photographer ==
- Vv.Aa. (12 May 2012). Stanley Kubrick Photographer. Catalog of the "Stanley Kubrick Photographer" exhibition held at the Royal Museums of Fine Arts of Belgium, Brussels, Belgium. Arles, France: Actes Sud. ISBN 978-8809776661.
- Brügger, Ingried; Ortner-Kreil, Lisa, eds. (2014). Eyes Wide Open: Stanley Kubrick als Fotograf [Eyes Wide Open: Stanley Kubrick as a Photographer]. Catalog of an exhibition held at the Bank Austria Kunstforum, Vienna, 8 May-13 July 2014 (in German). Nürnberg, Germany and Wien, Austria: Verlag für moderne Kunst and Kunstforum Wien. ISBN 978-3869840697.
- Calabrese, Omar (2012). Stanley Kubrick fotografo [Stanley Kubrick the Photographer] (Catalog of an exhibition held at the Palazzo delle Arti di Napoli, Naples, Italy in 2012) (in Italian). Firenze, Italy: Giunti. ISBN 978-8809778849.
- Crone, Rainer (2005). Stanley Kubrick: Drama & Shadows – Photographs 1945–1950. London, England and New York, N.Y.: Phaidon. ISBN 978-0-7148-4438-1.
- Crone, Rainer; Wirth, Wouter (15 November 2011). Stanley Kubrick: visioni e finzioni 1945–1950 [Stanley Kubrick: Visions and Fictions 1945–1950] (in Italian). Firenze, Italy: Giunti. ISBN 978-8809768789.
- Martino, Caterina (2021). Look Over Look: il cuore fotografico del cinema di Stanley Kubrick [Look Over Look: The Photographic Heart of Stanley Kubrick's Cinema] (in Italian). Milano, Italy: Mimesis. ISBN 978-8857579115.
- Mather, Philippe (2013). Stanley Kubrick at Look Magazine: Authorship and Genre in Photojournalism and Film. Bristol, England: Intellect. ISBN 978-1-84150-611-1.
- Sante, Luc; Corcoran, Sean; Albrecht, Donald (2018). Stanley Kubrick Photographs: Through a Different Lens. Köln, Germany: Taschen. ISBN 978-3-8365-7232-3.
- Sgarbi, Elisabetta (July 1994). Stanley Kubrick: Ladro di sguardi – Fotografie di fotografie – 1945–1949 [Stanley Kubrick: The Looks Thief – Photographs of Photographs – 1945–1949] (in Italian). Milano, Italy: Bompiani. ISBN 978-8845224102.

== Documentaries ==
- Kubrick by Kubrick (Motion picture). Written and directed by Grégory Monro. 12 May 2020. OCLC 1390632748.
- Room 237 (Motion picture). Written and directed by Rodney Ascher. 23 January 2012. OCLC 854579016.
- S Is for Stanley: 30 Years Behind the Wheel for Stanley Kubrick (Motion picture). Directed by Alex Infascelli, written by Alex Infascelli, Filippo Ulivieri and Vincenzo Scuccimarra. October 2015. OCLC 1090158732.
- Stanley Kubrick's Boxes (Television production). Written and directed by Jon Ronson. 15 July 2008. OCLC 513359220.
- Stanley Kubrick: A Life in Pictures (Motion picture). Directed by Jan Harlan. 17 February 2001. OCLC 179924124.
