= List of books on films =

This list of books on films is for books dedicated to individual films, film series, or related critical analyses.

== American films ==
Avatar (2009)

- Canty, James C. (29 January 2010). James Cameron's Avatar: Things You Might Not Know About Avatar, the Film by James Cameron. ISBN 978-1-4505-4619-5.
- Grabiner, Ellen (11 June 2012). I See You: The Shifting Paradigms of James Cameron's Avatar. McFarland. ISBN 978-0-7864-9027-1.
- Mahoney, Kevin Patrick (2010). The Ultimate Fan's Guide to Avatar: James Cameron's Epic Movie. Punked Books. ISBN 978-0-9533172-5-7.

Birth of a Nation (1915)

- Merritt, Russell; Shepard, David (1992). Making The Birth of a Nation. Kino on Video.
- Lang, Robert (1994). The Birth of a Nation: D.W. Griffith, Director. Rutgers University Press. ISBN 978-0-8135-2027-8.
- Stokes, Melvyn (14 December 2007). D.W. Griffith's the Birth of a Nation: A History of the Most Controversial Motion Picture of All Time. Oxford University Press. ISBN 978-0-19-988751-4.

Bringing Up Baby (1938)

- Mast, Gerald (1988). Bringing Up Baby. Rutgers University Press. ISBN 978-0-8135-1341-6.
- Swaab, Peter (4 January 2011). Bringing Up Baby. British Film Institute. ISBN 978-1-84457-070-6.

Casablanca (1942)

- Augé, Marc (2009). Casablanca: Movies and Memory. U of Minnesota Press. ISBN 978-0-8166-5640-0.
- Lebo, Harlan (1 October 1992). Casablanca: Behind the Scenes. Simon and Schuster. ISBN 978-0-671-76981-9.
- Osborne, Richard E. (1997). The Casablanca Companion: The Movie Classic and Its Place in History. Riebel-Roque Publishing Company. ISBN 978-0-9628324-3-7.

Citizen Kane (1941)

- Barnes, Diana (1 November 2011). Citizen Kane. Insight Publications. ISBN 978-1-921088-63-6.
- Carringer, Robert L. (1996). The Making of Citizen Kane. University of California Press. ISBN 978-0-520-20567-3.
- Gottesman, Ronald (1996). Perspectives on Citizen Kane. G.K. Hall. ISBN 978-0-8161-1616-4.
- Mulvey, Laura (4 September 2012). Citizen Kane. British Film Institute. ISBN 978-1-84457-497-1.
- Naremore, James (2004). Orson Welles's Citizen Kane: A Casebook. Oxford University Press. ISBN 978-0-19-515891-5.
- Welles, Orson; Mankiewicz, Herman Jacob; Kael, Pauline (2002). Citizen Kane: the complete screenplay. Methuen. ISBN 978-0-413-77187-2.

Cold Mountain (2003)

- Frazier, Charles; Auiler, Dan; Minghella, Anthony (30 November 2003). Cold Mountain: The Journey from Book to Film. Newmarket Press. ISBN 978-1-55704-593-5.

Eyes Wide Shut (1999)

- Althaus, Benjamin (18 November 2004). Communication in Stanley Kubrick's "Eyes Wide Shut". GRIN Verlag. ISBN 978-3-638-32589-9.
- Ruwe, Carolin (November 2007). Symbols in Stanley Kubrick's Movie 'Eyes Wide Shut'. GRIN Verlag. ISBN 978-3-638-84176-4.

Full Metal Jacket (1987)

- Modine, Matthew (25 October 2005). Full Metal Jacket Diary. Rugged Land.

The Godfather trilogy (1972–90)

- Browne, Nick (2000). Francis Ford Coppola's The Godfather Trilogy. Cambridge University Press. ISBN 978-0-521-55950-8.
- Lebo, Harlan (25 October 2005). The Godfather Legacy: The Untold Story of the Making of the Classic Godfather Trilogy Featuring Never-Before-Published Production Stills. Simon and Schuster. ISBN 978-0-7432-8777-7.
- Messenger, Chris (25 April 2002). The Godfather and American Culture: How the Corleones Became "Our Gang". SUNY Press. ISBN 978-0-7914-5357-5.
- Sciannameo, Franco (11 October 2010). Nino Rota's The Godfather Trilogy: A Film Score Guide. Scarecrow Press. ISBN 978-1-4616-6424-6.

Gone with the Wind (1939)

- Bartel, Pauline (1 October 1989). The Complete Gone with the Wind Trivia Book: The Movie and More. Taylor Trade Publishing. ISBN 978-1-4616-0422-8.
- Bridges, Herb (1998). The Filming of Gone with the Wind. Mercer University Press. ISBN 978-0-86554-621-9.
- Harwell, Richard Barksdale (1 February 1992). Gone With the Wind As Book and Film. University of South Carolina Press. ISBN 978-0-87249-836-5.
- Leitch, Thomas (1 March 2009). Film Adaptation and Its Discontents: From Gone with the Wind to The Passion of the Christ. JHU Press. ISBN 978-0-8018-9187-8.
- Molt, Cynthia Marylee (2012). Gone with the Wind on Film: A Complete Reference Work. McFarland & Company Incorporated Pub. ISBN 978-0-7864-7282-6.
- Vertrees, Alan David (1997). Selznick's Vision: Gone with the Wind and Hollywood Filmmaking. University of Texas Press. ISBN 978-0-292-78729-2.

The Graduate (1967)

- Whitehead, J.W. (22 December 2010). Appraising The Graduate: The Mike Nichols Classic and Its Impact in Hollywood. McFarland. ISBN 978-0-7864-8481-2.

It's a Wonderful Life (1946)

- Basinger, Jeanine; Trustees, Frank Capra Archives (Wesleyan University, Middletown, Conn.). (12 October 1986). The "It's a wonderful life" book. Knopf. ISBN 978-0-394-55605-5.
- Cox, Stephen (July 2004). It's a Wonderful Life: A Memory Book. Cumberland House. ISBN 978-1-58182-434-6.
- Hawkins, Jimmy (21 November 1995). The It's a Wonderful Life: Trivia Book. Crown Publishing Group. ISBN 978-0-517-88627-4.
- Willian, Michael (1 October 2006). The Essential It's a Wonderful Life: A Scene-by-Scene Guide to the Classic Film. Chicago Review Press. ISBN 978-1-56976-428-2.
- A Structural Analysis of Frank Capra's It's a Wonderful Life. GRIN Verlag. June 2012. ISBN 978-3-656-21211-9.

Lolita (1962)

- Schulze, Kerstin (10 May 2011). A novel and its adaptation: Stanley Kubrick: Lolita (1962). GRIN Verlag. ISBN 978-3-640-91182-0.

Psycho (1960)

- Hitchcock, Alfred; Anobile, Richard J. (1974). Alfred Hitchcock's Psycho. Pan Books. ISBN 978-0-330-24213-4.
- Kolker, Robert Phillip (2004). Alfred Hitchcock's Psycho: A Casebook. Oxford University Press. ISBN 978-0-19-516919-5.
- Rebello, Stephen (16 June 2010). Alfred Hitchcock and the Making of Psycho. Open Road Media. ISBN 978-1-4532-0122-0.
- Skerry, Philip J. (1 January 2005). The Shower Scene in Hitchcock's Psycho: Creating Cinematic Suspense And Terror. Edwin Mellen Press. ISBN 978-0-7734-6051-5.
- Smith III, Joseph W. (16 September 2009). The Psycho File: A Comprehensive Guide to Hitchcock's Classic Shocker. McFarland. ISBN 978-0-7864-5486-0.
- Wells, Amanda Sheahan (2001). Psycho: director, Alfred Hitchcock. Longman. ISBN 978-0-582-43191-1.

Schindler's List (1993)

- Loshitzky, Yosefa (1 January 1997). Spielberg's Holocaust: Critical Perspectives on Schindler's List. Indiana University Press. ISBN 0-253-21098-4.
- Palowski, Franciszek (1998). The Making of Schindler's List: Behind the Scenes of an Epic Film. Carol Publishing Group. ISBN 978-1-55972-445-6.

Star Wars franchise (1977–)

- Bouzereau, Laurent; Duncan, Jody (1999). Star Wars: The Making of Episode I, The Phantom Menace. Ballantine Publ. Group. ISBN 978-0-345-43111-0.
- Decker, Kevin S.; Eberl, Jason T.; Irwin, William (21 August 2013). Star Wars and Philosophy: More Powerful than You Can Possibly Imagine. Open Court. ISBN 978-0-8126-9701-8.
- Rinzler, J. W. (2010). The Making of The Empire Strikes Back: Star Wars The Definitive Story. Del Rey Books. ISBN 978-0-345-50961-1.
- Rinzler, J. W. (July 2008). The Making of Star Wars: The Definitive Story Behind the Original Film. Ebury Press. ISBN 978-0-09-192499-7.
- Star Wars and History. Lucasfilm, John Wiley & Sons. 15 October 2012. ISBN 978-1-118-28525-1.

Sunset Boulevard (1950)

- Staggs, Sam (4 February 2003). Close-up on Sunset Boulevard: Billy Wilder, Norma Desmond, and the Dark Hollywood Dream. St. Martin's Press. ISBN 978-1-4668-3046-2.
- Wilder, Billy (1999). Sunset Boulevard. University of California Press. ISBN 978-0-520-21855-0. (screenplay)

Tootsie (1982)

- Dworkin, Susan (28 August 2012). Making Tootsie: Inside the Classic Film with Dustin Hoffman and Sydney Pollack. Newmarket Press. ISBN 978-1-55704-966-7.

Touch of Evil (1958)

- Comito, Terry (1985). Touch of Evil: Orson Welles, Director. Rutgers University Press. ISBN 978-0-8135-1097-2.

Vertigo (1958)

- Auiler, Dan (21 November 2013). Vertigo: The Making of a Hitchcock Classic: Special Edition. Dan Auiler. ISBN 978-1-311-53317-3.
- Cunningham, Douglas A. (2012). The San Francisco of Alfred Hitchcock's Vertigo: Place, Pilgrimage, and Commemoration. Scarecrow Press. ISBN 978-0-8108-8122-8.
- Makkai, Katalin (21 August 2013). Vertigo. Routledge. p. 69. ISBN 978-1-136-23131-5.
- Raubicheck, Walter; Srebnick, Walter (1991). Hitchcock's Rereleased Films: From Rope to Vertigo. Wayne State University Press. ISBN 0-8143-2326-X.

The Wizard of Oz (1939)

- Harmetz, Aljean (2 December 1998). The Making of the Wizard of Oz: Movie Magic and Studio Power in the Prime of MGM. Hyperion. ISBN 978-0-7868-8352-3.
- Rushdie, Salman (4 September 2012). The Wizard of Oz. British Film Institute. ISBN 978-1-84457-516-9.

== Asian films ==
=== Hong Kong ===
A Better Tomorrow (1986)

- Fang, Karen Y. (2004). John Woo's A better tomorrow. Hong Kong University Press. ISBN 978-962-209-652-3.

Ashes of Time (1994)

- Dissanayake, Wimal (1 June 2003). Wong Kar-wai's Ashes of Time. Hong Kong University Press. ISBN 978-962-209-584-7.

An Autumn's Tale (1987)

- Ford, Stacilee (1 April 2008). Mabel Cheung Yuen-Ting's An Autumn's Tale. Hong Kong University Press. ISBN 978-962-209-894-7.

Bullet in the Head (1990)

- Williams, Tony (2009). John Woo's Bullet in the Head. Hong Kong University Press. ISBN 978-962-209-968-5.

Center Stage (1991)

- Hjort, Mette (1 January 2007). Stanley Kwan's Center Stage. Hong Kong University Press. ISBN 978-962-209-791-9.

Durian Durian (2000)

- Gan, Wendy (1 May 2005). Fruit Chan's Durian Durian. Hong Kong University Press. ISBN 978-962-209-743-8.

Happy Together (1997)

- Tambling, Jeremy (1 June 2003). Wong Kar-wai's Happy Together. Hong Kong University Press. ISBN 978-962-209-588-5.

He's a Woman, She's a Man (1994)

- Stokes, Lisa Odham (1 April 2009). Peter Ho-Sun Chan's He's a Woman, She's a Man. Hong Kong University Press. ISBN 978-962-209-970-8.

Internal Affairs (2002–03)

- Marchetti, Gina (1 April 2007). Andrew Lau and Alan Mak's Infernal Affairs - The Trilogy. Hong Kong University Press. ISBN 978-962-209-801-5.

The Killer (1989)

- Hall, Kenneth E. (1 January 2009). John Woo's The Killer. Hong Kong University Press. ISBN 978-962-209-956-2.

Made in Hong Kong (1997)

- Cheung, Esther M.K. (1 July 2009). Fruit Chan's Made in Hong Kong. Hong Kong University Press. ISBN 978-962-209-977-7.

PTU (2003)

- Ingham, Michael (1 March 2009). Johnnie To Kei-Fung's PTU. Hong Kong University Press. ISBN 978-962-209-919-7.

Song of the Exile (1990)

- Yue, Audrey (1 March 2010). Ann Hui's Song of the Exile. Hong Kong University Press. ISBN 978-988-8028-75-7.

Wing Chun (1994)

- Vojkovic, Sasha (1 March 2009). Yuen Woo Ping's Wing Chun. Hong Kong University Press. ISBN 978-962-209-967-8.

=== Indian ===
The Apu Trilogy (1955–59)

- Chawdhary, Surendar (14 July 2011). The Pather Panchali of Satyajit Ray: An Illustrated Study. McFarland. ISBN 978-0-7864-6353-4.
- Kutty, K. V. Raman; Ray, Satyajit (1982). A Critical Analysis of Satyajit Ray's Film Pather Panchali. Ohio State University.
- Ray, Satyajit (2006). The Apu Trilogy. Seagull Books. ISBN 978-1-905422-06-7.
- Ray, Satyajit (1984). Pather Panchali. Cine Central.
- Robinson, Andrew (15 November 2010). The Apu Trilogy: Satyajit Ray and the Making of an Epic. I. B. Tauris. ISBN 978-1-84885-515-1.
- Wood, Robin (1971). The Apu trilogy. Praeger.

Mother India (1957)

- Chatterjee, Gayatri (2002). Mother India. Penguin Books. ISBN 978-0-14-302904-5.

=== Japanese ===
- Breakwell, Ian (1995). An actor's revenge. British Film Institute. ISBN 978-0-85170-524-8.
- Ruoff, Jeffrey; Ruoff, Kenneth; Hara, Kazuo (1998). The emperor's naked army marches on. Flicks Books. ISBN 978-0-948911-05-7.
- Mellen, Joan (1 April 2004). In the Realm of the Senses. British Film Institute. ISBN 978-1-84457-034-8.
- Andrew, Dudley; Cavanaugh, Carole (27 March 2000). Sanshô Dayû. BFI Publishing. ISBN 978-0-85170-815-7.
- MacDonald, Keiko I. (1993). Ugetsu: Kenji Mizoguchi, Director. Rutgers University Press. ISBN 978-0-8135-1862-6.

A Page of Madness (1926)

- Gerow, Aaron Andrew (2008). A Page of Madness: Cinema and Modernity in 1920s Japan. Center for Japanese Studies, The University of Michigan. ISBN 978-1-929280-51-3.
- Lewinsky, Mariann (1997). Eine Verrückte Seite: Stummfilm und filmische Avantgarde in Japan. Chronos. ISBN 978-3-905312-28-7.

Rashomon (1950)

- Kurosawa, Akira; Richie, Donald (January 1987). Rashomon. Rutgers University Press. ISBN 978-0-8135-1180-1.
- Richie, Donald (1972). Focus on Rashomon. Prentice-Hall. ISBN 978-0-13-752980-3.

Seven Samurai (1954)

- Mellen, Joan (2002). Seven Samurai. British Film Institute. ISBN 978-0-85170-915-4.
- Stafford, Roy (1 October 2001). Seven samurai. Longman. ISBN 978-0-582-45256-5.

Tokyo Story (1953)

- Desser, David (13 April 1997). Ozu's Tokyo Story. Cambridge University Press. ISBN 978-0-521-48435-0.
- Ozu, Yasujirō; Noda, Kōgo (2003). Tokyo Story: The Ozu/Noda Screenplay. Stone Bridge Press. ISBN 978-1-880656-80-8.

=== Taiwanese ===
A Touch of Zen (1971)

- Teo, Stephen (2007). King Hu's A Touch of Zen. Hong Kong University Press. ISBN 978-962-209-815-2.

== European films ==
=== British ===
2001: A Space Odyssey (1968)

- Agel, Jérôme (June 1970). The Making of Kubrick's 2001. New American Library.
- Chion, Michel (2001). Kubrick's cinema odyssey. British Film Institute. ISBN 978-0-85170-839-3.
- Kolker, Robert (24 February 2006). Stanley Kubrick's 2001: A Space Odyssey:New Essays. Oxford University Press. ISBN 978-0-19-972436-9.
- Wheat, Leonard F. (21 June 2000). Kubrick's 2001: A Triple Allegory. Scarecrow Press. ISBN 978-1-4616-6023-1.

A Clockwork Orange (1971)

- Burgess, Anthony (2000). Stanley Kubrick's a Clockwork Orange: Based on the Novel by Anthony Burgess. ScreenPress Books. ISBN 978-1-901680-47-8.
- Heide, Thomas von der (1 June 2006). A Clockwork Orange - The presentation and the impact of violence in the novel and in the film. GRIN Verlag. ISBN 978-3-638-50681-6.
- McDougal, Stuart Y. (7 July 2003). Stanley Kubrick's A Clockwork Orange. Cambridge University Press. ISBN 978-0-521-57488-4.
- Volkmann, Maren (16 October 2006). "A Clockwork Orange" in the Context of Subculture. GRIN Verlag. ISBN 978-3-638-55498-5.

Lawrence of Arabia (1962)

- Caton, Steven Charles (1999). Lawrence of Arabia: A Film's Anthropology. University of California Press. ISBN 978-0-520-21083-7.
- Jackson, Kevin (1 June 2007). Lawrence of Arabia. British Film Institute. ISBN 978-1-84457-178-9.

Sense and Sensibility (1995)

- Thompson, Emma; Doran, Lindsay (1995). Sense and Sensibility: The Screenplay and Diaries. Bloomsbury. ISBN 1-55704-782-0.

=== French ===
Breathless / À bout de souffle (1960)

- Andrew, Dudley (1987). Breathless. Rutgers University Press. ISBN 978-0-8135-1253-2.

The Rules of the Game / La Regle de Jeu (1939)

- Perkins, V.F. (4 September 2012). La Regle du jeu. British Film Institute. ISBN 978-0-85170-965-9.
- Reader, Keith (15 April 2010). La Regle Du Jeu: French Film Guide. I.B. Tauris. ISBN 978-1-84885-054-5.

=== German ===
The Cabinet of Dr. Caligari / Das Cabinet Des Dr Caligari (1920)

- Robinson, David (8 November 2013). Das Cabinet des Dr. Caligari. British Film Institute. ISBN 978-1-84457-649-4.

Nosferatu (1922)

- Ashbury, Roy (5 November 2001). Nosferatu: director, Friedrich Wilhelm Murnau. Longman.
- Prawer, Siegbert Salomon; Herzog, Werner (2004). Nosferatu--Phantom der Nacht. BFI Pub. ISBN 978-1-84457-031-7.

=== Italian ===
8½ (1963)

- Benderson, Albert Edward (1 June 1974). Critical approaches to Federico Fellini's "8 1/2". Arno Press.
- Affron, Charles (1 January 1987). Eight and a Half. Rutgers University Press. ISBN 978-0-8135-1211-2.
- Miller, D.A. (15 July 2008). Eight and One Half. British Film Institute. ISBN 978-1-84457-231-1.

== Oceanian films ==
=== New Zealander ===
The Lord of the Rings Trilogy (2001–03)

- Bell, Anita Miller (2009). "The Lord of the Rings" and the Emerging Generation: A Study of the Message and Medium. J. R. R. Tolkien and Peter Jackson. ProQuest. p. 194. ISBN 978-1-109-24676-6.
- Margolis, Harriet; Cubitt, Sean; King, Barry (11 December 2012). Studying the Event Film: The Lord of the Rings. Manchester University Press. ISBN 978-0-7190-7199-7.
- Russell, Gary (2004). The Art of The Lord of the Rings. Houghton Mifflin Harcourt. p. 142. ISBN 0-618-51083-4.
- Sibley, Brian (November 2001). Lord of the Rings -Fellowship of the Ring:Insider's Guide. Collins. ISBN 978-0-00-713194-5.
- Sibley, Brian (2001). The Lord of the Rings Official Movie Guide. HarperCollins Publishers Limited. ISBN 978-0-00-711909-7.
- Sibley, Brian (6 November 2002). The Lord of the Rings: the making of the movie trilogy. Houghton Mifflin Company. ISBN 978-0-618-26022-5.
- Thompson, Kristin (2007). The Frodo Franchise: The Lord of the Rings and Modern Hollywood. University of California Press. ISBN 978-0-520-25813-6.

The Piano (1993)

- Margolis, Harriet, editor (2000). Jane Campion's "The Piano". Cambridge University Press. ISBN 0521592585.

== See also ==
- Stanley Kubrick bibliography
- Alfred Hitchcock bibliography
