= Craig Oldham =

British designer based in the UK (born 1985)

Craig Michael Oldham (born 1985, Barnsley, South Yorkshire) is a British designer based in the UK. Oldham has produced design work in design, film, television, art, retail, sports, entertainment, and education.

== Biography ==
Oldham has worked with various clients in a range of sectors including notably Manchester City F.C., Chester Zoo, Creative Review and the re-brand of the BRIT Awards with Vivienne Westwood in 2011. He's also worked with Archbishop Sentamu Academy, BBC, The Christie NHS Trust, The Co-operative, D&AD, Leeds Print Festival, The Manchester Evening News, National Football Museum, Nokia, The Poundshop, Universal Music Group, and Yorkshire Water.

He has been profiled in Grafik Magazine and Design Week, has won numerous awards including D&AD, Design Week Awards, Roses, Art Directors Club, Type Directors Club, New York Festivals, Creative Review Annual, and has contributed articles for Creative Review, Grafik Magazine, Eye Magazine, Baseline Magazine, IDEA Magazine, and Design Week.

Oldham has also published numerous of his own works, which have been predominantly educational in focus such as 12IN12 in 2007 and 10 Penneth in 2010. In 2012, Oldham began the educational initiative The Democratic Lecture, and published his third book of the same name. He also was involved in the exhibition Art Relay.

In 2011, Oldham published the book The Hand.Written.Letter.Project and has since exhibited the project in London in 2011, and in Sofia, Bulgaria in 2012, with plans to tour the UK, and internationally in 2013.

He was also involved in the exhibition Art Relay in 2012, and After Hours at Jerwood Visual Arts in 2013.
