= Petrus Schaesberg =

German art historian

Petrus Graf von Schaesberg (born Petrus Karl Martin Stephan Joseph Maria Graf von Schaesberg, November 7, 1967 – September 22, 2008) was a German art historian, artist, editor, and teacher.

== Biography ==
Born to parents Heinrich Wilhelm Viktor Walter Hubertus Maria Graf von Schaesberg and Margarethe Gräfin von Schaesberg Prinzessin von Croy in Munich, Bavaria. Petrus Schaesberg earned, in 2004, his Ph.D. (summa cum laude) at the Institute of Art History at LMU Munich, where he taught as an adjunct faculty member. At the time of his death, Schaesberg was an adjunct professor in the Art History department at Columbia University. Schaesberg's book Das Aufgehobene Bild published in 2007 by Wilhelm Fink Verlag, explored collage as a mode of painting — from Pablo Picasso to Richard Prince.

On September 22, 2008, Schaesberg was found dead in the courtyard of his Morningside Heights, Manhattan apartment. According to the medical examiner's office, Schaesberg committed suicide by jumping out of the window of his 8th floor apartment. Schaesberg left unfinished large-scale works on Ed Ruscha and Anish Kapoor.

== Books ==
- Louise Bourgeois: The Secret of the Cells, Prestel, Munich-Berlin-London-New York, 2008, pp. 167
- Das aufgehobene Bild. Collage als Modus der Malerei von Pablo Picasso bis Richard Prince. Muenchen: Wilhelm Fink Verlag, 2007, 220 pages.
- Ed. (with contribution): Stanley Kubrick. Still Moving Pictures. Fotografien 1945–50. Regensburg: Verlag Schnell & Steiner, Edition ICCARUS, 1999, 232 pages

(with Rainer Crone)

- Edited: Stanley Kubrick. Still Moving Pictures. Photographies 1945–50 (revised French edition). Paris: Edition ICCARUS / FNAC, 1999, 230 pages (with Rainer Crone)
- Edited (with introduction, p. 9-19): Paul Klee und Edward Ruscha. Projekt der Moderne. Sprache und Bild..Regensburg: Schnell & Steiner, Edition ICCARUS, 1998, 256 pages. With essays by Rainer Crone, Joseph Leo Koerner and Alexandra Gräfin Stosch
- Louise Bourgeois: The Secret of the Cells (co-authored with Rainer Crone). New York: Prestel Verlag 1998, 160 pages
- Louise Bourgeois: Das Geheimnis der Zelle. (co-authored with Rainer Crone). Munich: Prestel Verlag, 1998, 160 pages
- Lyrische Lebenswelten. Die Malerei von Nikolaus Hipp. Lyrical Worlds. The paintings of Nikolaus Hipp. Regensburg: Schnell & Steiner, Edition ICCARUS, 1998 (German and English edition), 128 pages (with Rainer Crone and a foreword by Gabriela Habsburg)

== Essays ==
"Alexandra Paperno. Star Maps" NCCA (National Centre for Contemporary Arts), Moscow, 2007, pp. 5–14

"Stanley Kubrick. Inventor of Facts" in: Rainer Crone, Drama & Shadows, London: Phaidon Press, 2005, pp. 242–246. (with foreword by Jeff Wall and essays by Rainer Crone and Alexandra Stosch)

German Edition: Berlin: Phaidon, 2005 French Edition: Paris: Phaidon, 2005 Japanese Edition: Tokyo: Phaidon, 2005

"David Salle. Shattered Worlds. The Principle of Montage." in: David Salle, Moscow: Stella Art Gallery, 2004, pp. 3–13.

"Andy Warhol. The Three Golden Rules of an Artist" in: Pop Art. The John and Kimiko Powers Collection, New York: Gagosian Gallery, 2001, pp. 81–94 (with Rainer Crone) and with essays by Germano Celant, Jim Dine, Jeremy Gilbert-Rolfe, Judith Goldman, Dave Hickey, Linda Norden, Lane Relyea, Scott Rothkopf and David Shapiro

Ed.(with introduction) "Paul Klee und Edward Ruscha. Projekt der Moderne. Sprache und Bild." Regensburg: Schnell & Steiner, Edition ICCARUS, 1998, pp. 9–19 (with essays by Rainer Crone, Joseph Leo Koerner and Alexandra Stosch)

"Andy Warhol. Heads (after Picasso)" (English/German, Galerie Ropac, Paris/Salzburg, 1997 (with Rainer Crone) (with an essay by Robert Rosenblum)

"Juan Usle. Ojo Roto" (English, Spanish and Catalan) Museu d'Art Contemporani, Barcelona, 1996 (with Rainer Crone)

== Forthcoming works ==
- "The Reconstructed Image. Collage as a Mode of Painting from Pablo Picasso to Richard Prince," Monacelli Press/Random House, 2009
- "Edward Ruscha. Catalogue Raisonné of Works on Paper. Volume I (1956 to 1969)." Gagosian Gallery, New York and Steidl Verlag, Göttingen. 2008
- "Anish Kapoor Catalogue Raisonné of Sculptures. Volume I (1977–1992)" Contracted with Steidl Verlag, Göttingen.2009

== Exhibitions ==
- Stanley Kubrick. Still Moving Pictures
- Photographs by Stanley Kubrick from 1945 to 1950

with ICCARUS

- Kunsthalle zu Kiel, June – July 1998
- Kölnischer Kunstverein, August 1999
- Fototage Biel, Schweiz, August 1999
- FNAC Paris, September 1999
- Museum St. Ingbert, February 2000
- Inverleith House, Edinburgh, February 2001
- Haus am Lützowplatz, Berlin, April 2001
- Fundacio Municipal de Cultura, Valladolid, Spain September 2001

== Honors ==
- Graduated summa cum laude, LMU Munich, 2004
- Promotion/ Stipend for publication of dissertation by Geschwister Boehringer Ingelheim Stiftung für Geisteswissenschaften, 2005
- Promotion for publication of dissertation by Johanna und Fritz Buch Gedächtnis-Stiftung, 2005

== Memberships ==
- since 1999 Honorary Member of the International Fellows of Harvard University Art Museums
- since 2001 Member of the Bavarian-American Academy at Bayerisch-Amerikanisches Zentrum im Amerika Haus München e.V
