= Stanley Kubrick: Drama & Shadows: Photographs 1945–1950 =

Anthological photography book

- Editor: Rainer Crone
- Author: Stanley Kubrick
- Genre: Photography
- Publication date: 2005

Stanley Kubrick: Drama & Shadows: Photographs 1945–1950 is an anthological photography book organized by German art historian Rainer Crone, published in 2005.

== Summary ==
It reunites a selection of the photographic work that future filmmaker Stanley Kubrick did while working for Look in his youth, from 1945 to 1950. The book is the first to extensively document Kubrick's artistic and professional work as a photographer before his directorial career.

== Content ==
Kubrick after finishing high school in 1945, started working for the Look magazine, based in New York, first as a freelance photographer, when he was only 17 years old, then as an apprentice, since April 1946, and finally as a staff photographer, since 1947. He would work there until 1950, and during this time he took thousands of photographs directly related to the American modern life. This anthological book selects around 350 photographs from his vast body of work, with around 30 photographic stories, divided in four chapters: "Metropolitan Life," "Entertainment," "Celebrities," and "Human Behavior". The book also includes work from a trip he made to Nazaré, in Portugal. The book examines his subjects, visual style and the influence that it would have in his future work as a leading contemporary filmmaker.

Rainer Crone stated that "Kubrick's photography created not only visual archives of the time but also social critiques that expressed his intuitive mind and subversive sense of humor. Each of his amazingly thought-out pictures is a conscious challenge to the viewer's own perception, pushing the potentials of representation and the photographic medium. Kubrick developed this singular quality in his photographs and applied it through all his films-each of which can be read as a sequence of perfectly composed still photographs."

== Reception ==
Frederic Raphael, writing for The Guardian praised the book and related it to Kubrick's future work as a filmmaker: "The photographs show an appetite for the dark side: the derelict (bums and commuting no-hopers), the deprived (often black), the doomed (gamblers and wannabe showgirls) and the primitive." He also states that "Kubrick's stills career ended when he broke into feature movies (...), but there is aesthetic continuity between his organisation of both still and moving images. It's made very clear in the long scene, in his masterpiece Barry Lyndon, where the two highwaymen lounge outside an inn while they quiz and are quizzed by the mounted Barry (Ryan O'Neal)."

Film critic Richard Schickel wrote a mixed review on the book: "These pictures have a certain formal interest, but they really don’t say anything useful about postwar America, since we were essentially creating lies about it. And by presenting these photos without their original text blocks or captions, which at least imparted a little narrative coherence, Crone forces them to be judged as abstract - and, alas, routine - compositions, unworthy of their pompous presentation in this handsome volume. Still, he does trigger some interesting reflections on the unsolved mystery of Stanley Kubrick, that self-made enigma. And that’s always a worthwhile occupation."
