= David G. Stork =

American scientist and author

David Stork
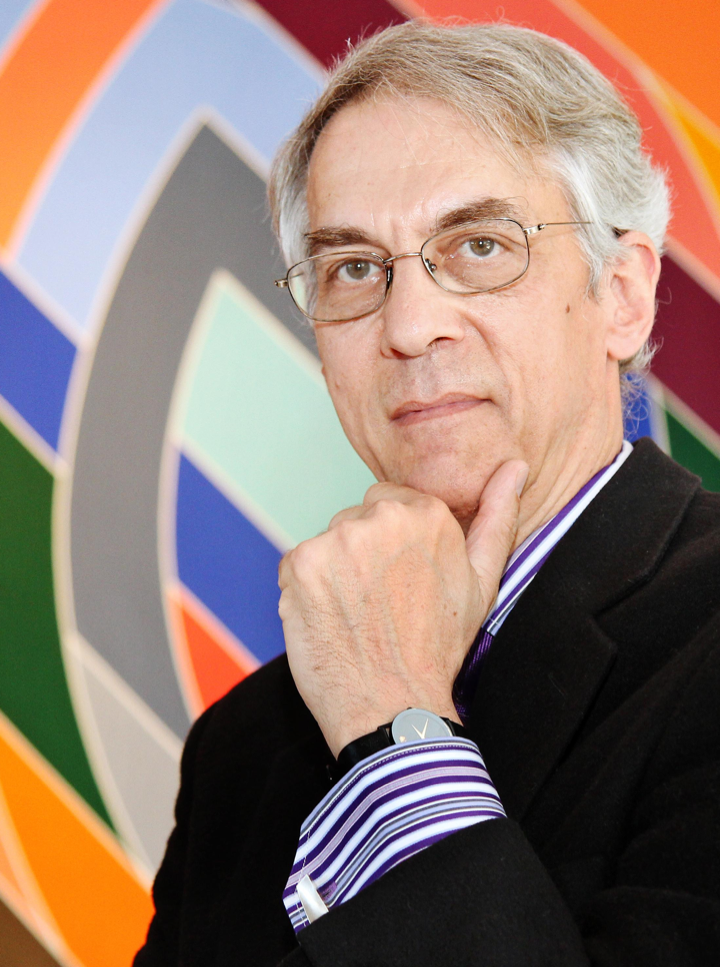
- Stork in 2020
- Education: Massachusetts Institute of Technology (BA); University of Maryland, College Park (PhD)
- Scientific career
- Fields: Pattern recognition, machine learning, computer vision, artificial intelligence, technical art analysis
- Institutions: Wellesley College; Swarthmore College; Clark University; Boston University; Stanford University; Technical University of Vienna; University College London

David G. Stork is a scientist and author, who has made contributions to machine learning, pattern recognition, computer vision, artificial intelligence, computational optics, image analysis of fine art, and related fields.

== Biography ==
Stork received his BS in Physics from the Massachusetts Institute of Technology with a thesis under the direction of Dr. Edwin Land, President and CEO of the Polaroid Corporation, and his MS and PhD in Physics from the University of Maryland, College Park with a thesis under the direction of David S. Falk.

He published several of the first scholarly works in the field, offered its first courses (at Stanford University), co-founded its first conference, now called Computer Vision and Analysis of Art (CVAA), and published the first textbook pertaining to the field, Pixels & paintings: Foundations of computer-assisted connoisseurship (Wiley).

Stork has authored more than 200 peer-reviewed articles and nine books or edited volumes, and he holds 64 U.S. patents. His major works include the influential textbook Pattern Classification (2nd ed., with Richard O. Duda and Peter E. Hart), the optics text Seeing the Light: Optics in Nature, Photography, Color, Vision, and Holography, and HAL’s Legacy: 2001’s Computer as Dream and Reality, which inspired and accompanied the PBS documentary 2001: HAL’s Legacy. His later contributions include Pixels & Paintings: Foundations of Computer-Assisted Connoisseurship and several edited collections on computer vision and image analysis of art. Most recently, his article “Computer Vision, ML, and AI in the Study of Fine Art” (Communications of the ACM, 2024) highlights his continuing role in bridging the sciences and the humanities.

== Research ==
Stork’s research spans physics, computer science, applied mathematics, and the digital humanities, with particular emphasis on computer vision, computational imaging, and the analysis of fine art. His work in computer image analysis involves the quantitative study of paintings and drawings, addressing questions of attribution, stylistic characterization, studio practice, lighting, and the recovery of underdrawings. In computational sensing and imaging, he has developed methods that employ novel optical elements, including metasurfaces, as well as computational photography techniques for image acquisition and reconstruction. He has also pursued applications of computer algebra and symbolic mathematics alongside traditional numerical and statistical techniques.

In April 2018, he delivered the lecture “Rigorous Technical Image Analysis of Fine Art: Toward a Computer Connoisseurship” at the symposium Searching Through Seeing: Optimizing Computer Vision Technology for the Arts, organized by The Frick Collection and the Frick Art Reference Library in New York. The symposium brought together computer scientists and art historians to evaluate the potential of image-based technologies in art research and to develop strategies for usable search platforms in the arts.

== Memberships and awards ==
Stork is a Fellow of the Institute for Electrical and Electronics Engineers (IEEE), Optical Society of America (OSA), International Society for Optics and Photonics (SPIE), Society for Imaging Science and Technology (IS&T), International Association for Pattern Recognition (IAPR), and International Academy, Research, and Industry Association (IARIA), Asia-Pacific Artificial Intelligence Association, International Artificial Intelligence Industry Alliance, and 2023 Leonardo@Djerassi Fellow, and has been Senior Member of the Association for Computing Machinery (ACM) and Member of the Association for the Advancement of Artificial Intelligence (AAAI). He was awarded the 2017 Industrial Distinguished Leader Award from the Asia Pacific Signal and Information Processing Association (APSIPA)

== Selected works ==
- Pattern classification (2nd ed.) by R. O. Duda, P. E. Hart, and D. G. Stork (Wiley, 2001)
- Seeing the light: Optics in nature, photography, color, vision and holography (2nd ed.) by D. S. Falk, D. R. Brill, and D. G. Stork (Echo Point Press, 2019)
- Physics of Sound (3rd ed.) by R. O. Berg and D. G. Stork (Prentice-Hall, 2004)
- HAL's Legacy: 2001's computer as dream and reality, edited by D. G. Stork, with a Foreword by Arthur C. Clarke (MIT Press, 1996)
- "2001: HAL's Legacy", documentary film created by D. Kennard and D. G. Stork for PBS Television (South Carolina PBS Television, 2001)
- Speechreading by humans and machines, edited by D. G. Stork and M. E. Hennecke (Springer, 1996)
- Computer image analysis in the study of art, edited by D. G. Stork and J. Coddington (SPIE Press, 2008)
- Computer vision and image analysis of art, edited by D. G. Stork, J. Coddington and A. Bentkowska-Kafel (SPIE Press, 2010)
- Computer vision and image analysis of art II, edited by D. G. Stork, J. Coddington and A. Bentkowska-Kafel (SPIE Press, 2011)
- Pixels & paintings: Foundations of computer-assisted connoisseurship (Wiley, 2024)
  - Computer Vision, ML, and AI in the study of fine art Communications of the Association for Computing Machinery, May 2024
