= Grafik (magazine) =

Publication about graphic arts

Grafik Media Ltd
- Joint Editors: William Rowe & Marcroy Smith
- Categories: Graphic design, Visual culture
- First issue: July 2003
- Final issue: 2011
- Company: Grafik Media Ltd
- Country: UK
- Based in: London
- Language: English
- Website: grafik.net
- ISSN: 1479-7534

Grafik was a specialist London-based magazine on graphic design and visual culture.

== History ==
Grafik lasted nearly a quarter century as an independently published magazine. It started life as Hot Graphics International in the mid '80s during the ‘Digital Revolution’. With help from Meta and a new editor Tim Rich, the magazine was transformed into a monthly magazine Graphics International. In 2001 Caroline Roberts took over the role of editor and in July 2003 the magazine underwent a radical transformation of rebranding and re-designing by London-based graphic design agency MadeThought. The magazine was now called Grafik. In 2009 the role of publisher and editor-in-chief was taken over by Caroline Roberts, the new editor was Angharad Lewis, and the magazine was re-designed by Swedish graphic designer and art director Matilda Saxow.

In June 2010 the company which published Grafik, Adventures in Publishing Ltd., went into administration and was eventually liquidated; as a result, the magazine ceased publication for an eight-month period.

Editor-in-chief Caroline Roberts and Editor Angharad Lewis secured the rights to the name and assets of Grafik, and in October 2010 it was announced that the magazine would relaunch at the beginning of 2011.

The magazine was relaunched in February 2011 with a new publisher, Pyramyd, new designer, Michael Bojkowski and a revised editorial format created by a London-based agency called Woodbridge & Rees, formed by the previous editors. In December 2011, Pyramyd decided to cease publication of the magazine.

Grafik reemerged as a website in March 2014 under the editorial direction of former editors Caroline Roberts and Angharad Lewis, with a new editorial team and published in London by Protein.

In 2018 William Rowe (director of Protein) teamed up with Marcroy Smith (director of People of Print LTD) to form a new company called Grafik Media Ltd which is geared at bringing the magazine back into a printed publication and a global brand. The first step was creating Grafik Editions which is in partnership with The PrintSpace in Shoreditch, London to create limited edition archival prints by leading visual artists and graphic designers. They then moved into production of Grafik branded items and also launched Grafik Projects as a means to share the work of exceptional graphic design work across their publishing online platforms and act as a fundraising method towards the resurrection of Grafik Magazine. They hope to launch the new magazine Mid-2022.

== About Grafik ==
The magazine focuses on contemporary graphic design and international visual culture. Regular features include reviews of notable design events and exhibitions, showcases of emerging and established talent, critical viewpoints and special reports, often covering a piece of design history with a particular relevance for today. There are also regular features on logoforms and letterforms, and copious book reviews of both graphic design books and those of a more general interest to the creative community.
