= Michel Chion =

French composer

Michel Chion (born 1947) is a French film theorist and composer of Musique concrète.

== Life ==
Born in Creil, France, Chion teaches at several institutions in France and currently holds the post of Associate Professor at the University of Paris III: Sorbonne Nouvelle where he is a theoretician and teacher of audio-visual relationships.

After studying literature and music he began to work for the ORTF (French Radio and Television Organisation) Service de La recherche as assistant to Pierre Schaeffer in 1970. He was a member of the Groupe de Recherches Musicales (GRM) between 1971 and 1976.

His compositions elaborate on Schaeffarian theories and methodologies which Schaeffer referred to as musique concrète.

He has also written a number of books as well as essays expounding his theories of the interaction between sound and image within the medium of film.

In particular, the book titled L'audio-vision. Son et image au cinéma, originally published in France in 1990, has been considered by all critics as the definitive book on the relations between sound and image, which are described as two different languages within the multimedia art form, discussing the argument from both technical-linguistic and aesthetic points of view, where before it was discussed principally in terms of narrative implications.

== Writings ==
- 1982. (With Norbert Dufourcq and Marcelle Benoit). La musique électroacoustique. Paris: Presses Universitaires de France, ISBN 2-13-037262-7
- 1984. La voix au cinéma. [N.p.]: Cahiers du Cinéma Livres. ISBN 2-86642-004-7
- 1983. Guide des objets sonores: Pierre Schaeffer et la recherche musicale . Bibliothèque de recherche musicale. [N.p.]: Buchet Chastel. ISBN 2-7020-1439-9
- 1985. Le son au cinéma. New, revised and corrected edition. [N.p.]: Cahiers du Cinéma Livres. ISBN 2-86642-023-3
- 1987. Jacques Tati. Collection "Auteurs". [N.p.]: Cahiers du Cinéma. ISBN 2-86642-058-6
- 1994. Musiques, Médias, Technologie
- 1994. La symphonie à l'époque romantique. Les chemins de la musique. Paris: Fayard. ISBN 2-213-59271-3
- 1995. La musique au cinéma. Les chemins de la musique. Paris: Fayard. ISBN 2-213-59466-X
- 2001. David Lynch. New, enlarged edition. Collection "Auteurs". [N.p.]: Cahiers du Cinéma Livres. ISBN 2-86642-319-4
- 2002. Technique et création au cinéma
- 2004. The Thin Red Line. London: British Film Institute. ISBN 978-1-84457-044-7. Monograph about Terrence Malick's film The Thin Red Line; translated from the French by Trista Selous. A French version appeared in 2005.
- 2005. Stanley Kubrick : L'humain, ni plus ni moins. Collection "Auteurs". [N.p.]: Cahiers du Cinéma Livres. ISBN 2-86642-392-5
- 2005. Le son. [N.p.]: Armand Colin. ISBN 2-200-34103-2
- 2005. L´Audio-Vision. Son et image au cinéma. [N.p.]: Nathan. ISBN 2-09-190704-9 English edition, edited and translated by Claudia Gorbman, as Audio-Vision: Sound on Screen (New York: Columbia University Press, 1994) ISBN 0-231-07898-6
- 2008. Andrei Tarkovski. [N.p.]: Cahiers du Cinéma Livres. ISBN 2-86642-503-0
- 2009. Film: A Sound Art. New York: Columbia University Press. ISBN 978-0-231-13777-5
- 2016. Sound. An Acoulogical Treatise. Durham and London: Duke University Press. ISBN 978-0-822-36039-1

== Recordings ==
- La Vie En Prose – Une Symphonie Concrète (Broccoli 2011)
- Diktat (Nuun Records, Musique Concrète, 2010)
- Tu (Broccoli, BROCOLI 002, 2006)
- Les 120 jours with Lionel Marchetti, Jérôme Noetinger (Fringes, FRINGES ARCHIVE_03, 2004)
- Dix-sept minutes (Cinéma pour l'oreille, MKCD 032, 2002)
- L'opéra concret (MCE, MCE 01, 1998)
- On n'arrête pas le regret (Ina-GRM, INA_E 5005, 1996)
- Gloria (Cinéma pour l'oreille, MKCD 015, 1995)
- Préludes à la vie (empreintes DIGITALes, IMED 9523, 1995)
- Requiem (empreintes DIGITALes, IMED 9312, 1993)
- Credo mambo (Cinéma pour l'oreille, MKCD 004, 1992)
- La tentation de saint Antoine; La ronde (Ina-GRM, INA_C 2002–03, 1991)
- About Michel Chion: Lionel Marchetti, La musique concrète de Michel Chion, essay – Metamkine 1998 http://www.metamkine.com/

== List of works ==
- 24 préludes à la vie (1989–91)
- Crayonnés ferroviaires (1992)
- Credo Mambo (1992)
- Dix-sept minutes (2000)
- L'été (1982)
- Gloria (1994)
- Hymne de l'enfant à son réveil (1997)
- L'isle sonante (1998, 2005)
- La machine à passer le temps (1972)
- La Messe de terre (1996, 2003)
- Nuit noire (1979–85)
- On n'arrête pas le regret (1975)
- Le prisonnier du son (1972–91)
- Requiem (1973)
- La Ronde (1982)
- La Danse de l'épervier (Music for a Choreography by Hideyuki Yano, 1984)
- La roue (1972–85)
- Sambas pour un jour de pluie (1985)
- Sonate (1990)
- Suite volatile (1984)
- La Tentation de saint Antoine (1984)
- Tu (1977, 96)
- Une symphonie concrète (2006– )
- Variations (1990)
