= Alfred Hitchcock bibliography =

A list of books and essays about Alfred Hitchcock:

- Ackroyd, Peter (2016). Alfred Hitchcock: A Brief Life. Nan A. Talese. p. 288. ISBN 978-0385537414.
- Auiler, Dan; Jones, Robert; Sinclair, Aimee (1 July 2020). Hitchcock's California: Vista Visions From the Camera Eye. Middlebrow Books. ISBN 978-0-9837-3763-6.
- Gottlieb, Sidney (2003). Alfred Hitchcock: Interviews. Univ. Press of Mississippi. ISBN 978-1-57806-562-2.
- Hitchcock, Alfred (2 October 1985). Hitchcock. Simon & Schuster. ISBN 978-0-671-60429-5.
- McGilligan, Patrick (2004). Alfred Hitchcock: A Life in Darkness and Light (Reprint ed.). New York, NY: ReganBooks. p. 864. ISBN 978-0060988272.
- Sloan, Jane (1995). Alfred Hitchcock: A Filmography and Bibliography. University of California Press. ISBN 978-0-520-08904-4.
- Spoto, Donald (January 1999). The Dark Side of Genius: The Life of Alfred Hitchcock. Perseus Books Group. ISBN 978-0-306-80932-3.
- Sterritt, David (26 February 1993). The Films of Alfred Hitchcock. Cambridge University Press. ISBN 978-0-521-39814-5.

== Individual films ==
Vertigo (1958)

- Auiler, Dan (21 November 2013). Vertigo: The Making of a Hitchcock Classic: Special Edition. Dan Auiler. ISBN 978-1-311-53317-3.
- Cunningham, Douglas A. (2012). The San Francisco of Alfred Hitchcock's Vertigo: Place, Pilgrimage, and Commemoration. Scarecrow Press. ISBN 978-0-8108-8122-8.
- Makkai, Katalin (21 August 2013). Vertigo. Routledge. p. 69. ISBN 978-1-136-23131-5.
- Raubicheck, Walter; Srebnick, Walter (1991). Hitchcock's Rereleased Films: From Rope to Vertigo. Wayne State University Press. ISBN 0-8143-2326-X.

Psycho (1960)

- Hitchcock, Alfred; Anobile, Richard J. (1974). Alfred Hitchcock's Psycho. Pan Books. ISBN 978-0-330-24213-4.
- Kolker, Robert Phillip (2004). Alfred Hitchcock's Psycho: A Casebook. Oxford University Press. ISBN 978-0-19-516919-5.
- Rebello, Stephen (16 June 2010). Alfred Hitchcock and the Making of Psycho. Open Road Media. ISBN 978-1-4532-0122-0.
- Skerry, Philip J. (1 January 2005). The Shower Scene in Hitchcock's Psycho: Creating Cinematic Suspense And Terror. Edwin Mellen Press. ISBN 978-0-7734-6051-5.
- Smith III, Joseph W. (16 September 2009). The Psycho File: A Comprehensive Guide to Hitchcock's Classic Shocker. McFarland. ISBN 978-0-7864-5486-0.
- Wells, Amanda Sheahan (2001). Psycho: director, Alfred Hitchcock. Longman. ISBN 978-0-582-43191-1.
