= Rainer Crone =

German art historian (1942–2016)

- Born: May 7, 1942; Hamburg, Germany
- Died: June 2016; Regensburg, Germany

Rainer Crone (June 7, 1942 – June 2016) was a German art historian. He was University Professor emeritus of Contemporary Art and History of Film at LMU Munich and a specialist in the art of Andy Warhol. He previously taught at Yale University, the University of California, Berkeley, Columbia University, and New York University.

== Andy Warhol ==
He was known for writing the first catalogue raisonné of the artist, published in 1970, based on the research for his doctorate at University of Hamburg, and funded by a two-year doctoral grant from the German government, without commercial backing or financial support from any individuals or galleries. Crone began working with Andy Warhol in 1968, and continued working with Warhol on numerous books and projects until the artist’s death in 1987. Crone's first catalogue raisonné and his PhD thesis still only available in German are regarded as the first European scholarly response to the work of Andy Warhol.

In January 1970 Warhol and Crone discussed which painting should be used for the cover of the raisonné of his work. The artist suggested a Red Self-Portrait, which had been recently acquired by Warhol's largest European dealer and Interview magazine co-owner Bruno Bischofberger and signed, dated and dedicated to "Bruno B." Warhol provided an Ektrachrome of this work which used for the cover of the 1970 raisonne and its 1972 revised edition, and 1976 edition which listed this Red Self Portrait as entry #169. The Andy Warhol Foundation has refused to authenticate this work claiming it was produced by someone else on Warhol's instructions. However, Warhol signed the work and authorized its inclusion in the first catalogue raisonné; Crone argued that it should be considered an authentic Warhol.

In 1985 Crone, along with James Beck and as honorary founding member Meyer Schapiro, cofounded of the International Associates for Contemporary Art (I.A.C.A). Other founding members of the I.A.C.A included Eli Broad. The artists committee of the I.A.C.A included Georg Baselitz, John Baldessari, Richard Hamilton (artist), Jasper Johns, Donald Judd, Anish Kapoor, Alex Katz, Roy Lichtenstein, Robert Mapplethorpe, Claes Oldenburg, Robert Rauschenberg, Julian Schnabel, Frank Stella and Richard Serra. The I.A.C.A was replaced by ICCARUS in 1992.

== More about I.A.C.A. ==
The International Associates for Contemporary Art - I.A.C.A. (1985 to 1991) was the first curatorial program, recognized globally, as part of a major educational institution, Columbia University's Department of Art History and Archeology, with its own exhibition spaces, the Miriam and Ira D. Wallach Art Gallery.

During these years, Rainer Crone integrated into his theoretically-oriented art history seminars a direct personal discourse with prominent and emerging figures in contemporary art in New York City and beyond. Through these initiatives, Crone supported the work of students at Columbia, Munich, and elsewhere.

Crone led student visits to artists' studios, including those of Roy Lichtenstein, Donald Judd, Richard Serra, Claes Oldenburg, Richard Prince, Roni Horn, Philip Taaffe, Eric Fischl, David Salle, Julian Schnabel, and Peter Halley. He also organized lectures by artists at Columbia.

A result of Crone’s curatorial and pedagogic initiatives was the thematic exhibition Similia/Dissimilia, conceived and organized by Crone in collaboration with his students (1986–87). The show presented an early contemporary section (1960 to 1966) featuring artists Donald Judd, Joseph Beuys, Alighiero Boetti, John Chamberlain, Eva Hesse, Robert Ryman, Jasper Johns, Yves Klein and others, with as-yet unexhibited examples of their early work, along with the work of younger artists including Francesco Clemente, Peter Halley, Roni Horn, Anish Kapoor, Imi Knoebel, Tim Rollins & K.O.S., Philip Taaffe, Rosemarie Trockel, and Georg Herold. This exhibition was first hosted in the US by Miriam and Ira D. Wallach Art Gallery at Columbia University, Ileana Sonnabend Gallery and Leo Castelli Gallery in New York - and was subsequently shown at Kunsthalle Düsseldorf, Germany.

== Bibliography ==
=== Academic books ===
- Crone, Rainer. Andy Warhol. New York: Praeger, 1970. (translated from the German by John William Gabriel) OCLC 105846. in 438 libraries according to
- Crone, Rainer, and Wilfried Wiegand. Die revolutionäre Ästhetik Andy Warhol's. Darmstadt: Melzer, 1972. OCLC 2693966
- Crone, Rainer. Bildnerische Werk Andy Warhols. Berlin: Wasmuth, 1976 OCLC 7398701
- Crone, Rainer, and Andy Warhol. Andy Warhol: d. frühen Werke, 1942-1962. [Stuttgart]: Cantz, 1987. ISBN 9783922608783
- Crone, Rainer, and Petrus Schaesberg. Louise Bourgeois: The Secret of the Cells. Munich; New York : Prestel, c1998 ISBN 9783791316109. In 373 libraries according to
- Crone, Rainer, Kazimir Severinovich Malevich, and David Moos. Kazimir Malevich: The Climax of Disclosure. Chicago: University of Chicago Press, 1991. in 498 libraries according to
    - Review in TLS, the Times literary supplement. no. 4957, (1998): 33
    - Review by Darra Goldstein; Slavic Review, Winter, 1992, vol. 51, no. 4, p. 853-854
    - Review by John Milner; The Slavonic and East European Review, Jul., 1992, vol. 70, no. 3, p. 544-545
    - Review by John E Bowlt; Russian Review, Jul., 1993, vol. 52, no. 3, p. 424-425
    - Review by Jeremy Howard; The Burlington Magazine, Aug., 1998, vol. 140, no. 1145, p. 569-570
- Crone, Rainer. Similia/Dissimilia. New York: Rizzoli, 1988. ISBN 9780847809226
- Crone, Rainer, and Joseph Leo Koerner. Paul Klee: Legends of the Sign. New York: Columbia University Press, 1991. in 498 libraries according to
  - Translated into Japanese as Pauru Kurē kigō o meguru densetsu ISBN 9784002601779
    - Review by Brown, Maurice, 1992. "Review of Paul Klee: Legends of the Sign". Journal of Aesthetic Education. 26, no. 3: 120-121.
- Crone, Rainer. Rodin: Eros and creativity. Munich: Prestel, 2006. ISBN 379133719X
- Crone, Rainer, Nikolaus Hipp, Petrus Schaesberg, and Gabriela von Habsburg. Lyrical Worlds : the Painting of Nikolaus Hipp / Michael Foster. Regensburg: Schnell & Steiner, 1998. ISBN 9783795412111
- Crone, Rainer. Stanley Kubrick, Drama & Shadows: Photographs 1945-1950. Berlin: Phaidon Press Ltd., 2005. ISBN 9780-7-1484-438-1

=== Exhibition catalogues ===
- Crone, Rainer, and David Moos. Objet/objectif: relecture des choses dans la sculpture contemporaine. Paris: Daniel Templon, 1989.
