= List of films featuring Frankenstein's monster =

As of July 2026, a body of 494 known feature films, 248 short films, 105 TV series and 421 TV episodes feature some version or interpretation of the character Frankenstein's monster, first created by Mary Shelley in her 1818 novel Frankenstein; or, The Modern Prometheus.

The first film adaptation of Shelley's novel was Frankenstein, a short 1910 film directed by J. Searle Dawley. It was followed by Life Without Soul (1915) and Il mostro di Frankenstein (1921), both of these films are currently considered lost. The Frankenstein Trestle (1899) was the first film to use the word Frankenstein in its title, although it was not connected to the novel and showed a train crossing a trestle in the White Mountains.

The 1818 novel describes the creature's appearance as follows:

His yellow skin scarcely covered the work of muscles and arteries beneath; his hair was of a lustrous black, and flowing; his teeth of a pearly whiteness; but these luxuriances only formed a more horrid contrast with his watery eyes, that seemed almost of the same colour as the dun white sockets in which they were set.

Frankenstein's monster has appeared in many forms and inspired many similar characters. It has been gender-swapped, made into an animal, and given different personalities. Certain thematic elements remain, such as abandonment, the desire to be loved, and a dynamic love or hate relationship between creator and creation.

The 1931 film Frankenstein by Universal Pictures and its 1935 sequel, Bride of Frankenstein, have had an immense influence on the appearance and wider cultural understanding of the character. This rendition of the creation is the most pervasive and appears in pop culture and advertising very frequently. While the imagery of Frankenstein's monster in relation to the Universal appearance is inspired by Frankenstein, it is also frequent that characters of this appearance lack any relation to the novel and depart heavily from the themes and personality of the original work.

Nevertheless, characters made in the likeness of the Universal Monster are still Frankenstein's Monster, even if the only likeness is to a pastiche version of the character. On the other hand, some characters such as Mewtwo and Stitch exhibit similarities in personality, plot, and shared themes despite their lack of physical similarity. The films listed here tie back either to Shelley's Frankenstein thematically or to the imagery of Boris Karloff's rendition of the character on screen.

Frankenstein's Monster is a retelling of the cultural Golem myth. This list does not include creatures more directly inspired by The Golem, but focuses on those that Shelley's novel inspired. Not all undead characters are versions of Frankenstein, as they fall into other categories of Reanimation such as a Zombie.

== List of feature-length films (chronological) ==
Film	Year	Director(s)	Notes	Ref.
Life Without Soul	1915	Joseph W. Smiley	Lost film. Based on the novel.	
Frankenstein	1931	James Whale	Based on the novel.	
Bride of Frankenstein	1935	James Whale	Based on the novel.	
One in a Million	1936	Sidney Lanfield		
Sing, Baby, Sing	1936	Sidney Lanfield		
The Walking Dead	1936	Michael Curtiz	John Ellman character.	
El superloco	1937	Juan José Segura		
Son of Frankenstein	1939	Rowland V. Lee		
Hellzapoppin'	1941	H.C. Potter		
Man-Made Monster	1941	George Waggner		
The Ghost of Frankenstein	1942	Erle C. Kenton		
Frankenstein Meets the Wolf Man	1943	Roy William Neill		
The Mad Ghoul	1943	James P. Hogan		
Thursday's Child	1943	Rodney Ackland		
House of Frankenstein	1944	Erle C. Kenton		
House of Dracula	1945	Erle C. Kenton		
Blue Skies	1946	Stuart Heisler, Mark Sandrich		
Abbott and Costello Meet Frankenstein	1948	Charles Barton, Walter Lantz		
Master Minds	1949	Jean Yarbrough		
El Monstruo resucitado	1953	Chano Urueta		
Abbott and Costello Meet Dr. Jekyll and Mr. Hyde	1953	Charles Lamont		
Have Mercy	1953	Isa Karamah	Also known as Ismail Yassin Meets Frankenstein.	
Three are Three	1954	Eduardo García Maroto	"Una de monstruos" segment.	
Bride of the Monster	1955	Edward D. Wood Jr.		
The Phantom of the Operetta	1955	Enrique Carreras		
Indestructible Man	1956	Jack Pollexfen		
The Curse of Frankenstein	1957	Terence Fisher	Loosely based on the novel.	
I Was a Teenage Frankenstein	1957	Herbert L. Strock		
Frankenstein 1970	1958	Howard W. Koch		
The Revenge of Frankenstein	1958	Terence Fisher		
Tales of Frankenstein	1958	Curt Siodmak	TV pilot.	
How To Make A Monster	1958	Herbert L. Strock		
Frankenstein's Daughter	1958	Richard E. Cunha		
El castillo de los monstruos	1958	Julián Soler		
Mia nonna poliziotto	1958	Steno		
The Colossus of New York	1958	Eugène Lourié		
The Hell of Frankenstein	1960	Rafael Baledón		
Frankenstein, el vampiro y compañía	1962	Benito Alazraki		
Tom Thumb and Little Red Riding Hood	1962	Roberto Rodríguez		
House on Bare Mountain	1962	Lee Frost		
Naan Vanangum Deivam	1963	K. Somu		
Sexy proibitissimo	1963	Marcello Martinelli	Also known as Proibitissimo and Prohibited Sex.	
Santo in the Wax Museum	1963	Alfonso Corona Blake, Manuel San Fernando	Also known as Samson in the Wax Museum.	
The Evil of Frankenstein	1964	Freddie Francis		
Kiss Me Quick!	1964	Peter Perry Jr.	Also known as The Sexual Life of Frankenstein.	
How to Succeed with Girls	1964	Edward A. Biery		
Parodie Parade	1964	Paul Paviot	Re-release combination of several shorts, including Torticola contre Frankensberg	
Frankenstein vs. Baragon	1965	Ishirô Honda	Also known as Frankenstein Conquers the World.	
Frankenstein Meets the Space Monster	1965	Robert Gaffney		
Marineland Carnival: The Munsters Visit Marineland	1965	Bob Lehman	Television film.	
Salute to Stan Laurel	1965	Seymour Berns	Television film. Herman Munster character.	
The War of the Gargantuas	1966	Ishirô Honda		
Jesse James Meets Frankenstein's Daughter	1966	William Beaudine		
Munster, Go Home!	1966	Earl Bellamy		
Carry On Screaming!	1966	Gerald Thomas		
The Man Called Flintstone	1966	Joseph Barbera, William Hanna		
The Ghost in the Invisible Bikini	1966	Don Weis		
Casino Royale	1967	Val Guest, Ken Hughes, John Huston		
Frankenstein Created Woman	1967	Terence Fisher		
Mad Monster Party?	1967	Jules Bass		
Dr. Terror's Gallery of Horrors	1967	David L. Hewitt	Also known as Gallery of Horror and Blood Suckers.	
Fanny Hill Meets Dr. Erotico	1967	Barry Mahon		
Fearless Frank	1967	Philip Kaufman		
Yellow Submarine	1968	George Dunning		
Kilink Frankestayn ve Dr. No'ya Karsi	1968	Nuri Akinci		
Frankenstein Must Be Destroyed	1969	Terence Fisher		
The Monsters of Terror	1969	Tulio Demicheli, Hugo Fregonese, Antonio Isasi-Isasmendi	Also known as Assignment Terror and Dracula vs. Frankenstein.	
The Curious Dr. Humpp	1969	Emilio Vieyra		
The Nine Ages of Nakedness	1969	Harrison Marks		
The Horror of Frankenstein	1970	Jimmy Sangster		
Flesh Feast	1970	Brad F. Grinter		
Dr. Frankenstein on Campus	1970	Gilbert W. Taylor	Also known as Flick.	
Santo and Blue Demon vs. the Monsters	1970	Gilberto Martínez Solares		
Every Home Should Have One	1970	Jim Clark		
Cleopatra	1970	Osamu Tezuka, Eiichi Yamamoto		
Scream of the Demon Lover	1970	José Luis Merino	Also known as Killers of the Castle of Blood, Altar of Blood and Blood Castle.	
Necropolis	1970	Franco Brocani		
One More Time	1970	Jerry Lewis		
Lady Frankenstein	1971	Mel Welles		
Cake of Blood	1971	Francesc Bellmunt, Jaime Chávarri, Emilio Martínez Lázaro	"Victor Frankenstein" segment. Loosely based on the novel.	
Guess What Happened to Count Dracula?	1971	Laurence Merrick		
Dracula, Prisoner of Frankenstein	1972	Jesús Franco	Also known as Drácula contra Frankenstein.	
The Erotic Rites of Frankenstein	1972	Jesús Franco	Also known as La maldición de Frankenstein.	
Dracula vs. Frankenstein	1972	Al Adamson	Also known as Blood of Frankenstein.	
Frankenstein '80	1972	Mario Mancini		
Santo vs. Frankenstein's Daughter	1972	Miguel M. Delgado		
Flesh for Frankenstein	1973	Paul Morrissey, Antonio Margheriti		
Blackenstein	1973	William A. Levey		
Frankenstein: The True Story	1973	Jack Smight	Loosely based on the novel. Television film.	
The Spirit of the Beehive	1973	Víctor Erice		
Chabelo and Pepito vs. The Monsters	1973	José Estrada		
The Hunchback of the Morgue	1973	Javier Aguirre		
The Werewolf of Washington	1973	Milton Moses Ginsberg		
The Addams Family Fun House	1973	Bill Davis	Lost film.	
Blue Demon and Zovek in the Invasion of the Dead	1973	René Cardona		
The Aspiring Brooklyn Cat Detective	1973	Oscar Brazzi		
Frankenstein and the Monster from Hell	1974	Terence Fisher		
Young Frankenstein	1974	Mel Brooks		
Phantom of the Paradise	1974	Brian De Palma		
Frankenstein's Castle of Freaks	1974	Dick Randall		
Santo and Blue Demon vs. Dr. Frankenstein	1974	Miguel M. Delgado		
Really, Raquel	1974	Dave Wilson		
Frankenstein: A Love Story	1974	Bob Thénault	Loosely based on the novel. Television film.	
Capulina contra los monstruos	1974	Miguel Morayta		
Los vampiros los prefieren gorditos	1974	Gerardo Sofovich		
Son of Dracula	1974	Freddie Francis		
Sexcula	1974	John Holbrook	Pornographic parody.	
The Rocky Horror Picture Show	1975	Jim Sharman		
Frankenstein: Italian Style	1975	Armando Crispino		
My Friend Frankenstein	1975	Nejat Saydam		
Tommy	1975	Ken Russell		
Death Race 2000	1975	Paul Bartel		
Lisztomania	1975	Ken Russell		
The Whiz Kid and the Carnival Caper	1976	Tom Leetch	Television film.	
Devil's Kiss	1976	Jordi Gigó		
Sturmtruppen	1976	Salvatore Samperi		
Terror of Frankenstein	1977	Calvin Floyd	Based on the novel.	
The Flintstones Meet Rockula and Frankenstone	1977	Ray Patterson	Television film.	
Mr. Rossi's Dreams	1977	Bruno Bozzetto		
Halloween with the New Addams Family	1977	Dennis Steinmetz	Lurch character. Television film.	
Hitler: A Film from Germany	1977	Hans-Jürgen Syberberg		
Kiss Meets the Phantom of the Park	1978	Gordon Hessler	Television film.	
Son of Frankenstein	1979	Scott Allen Nollen		
Doctor Franken	1980	Marvin J. Chomsky, Jeff Lieberman	Television film.	
Boo!	1980	Danny Mann		
City of Women	1980	Federico Fellini		
Kyoufu Densetsu Kaiki! Frankenstein	1981	Yûgo Serikawa	Loosely based on the novel. Television film.	
Frankenstein Island	1981	Jerry Warren		
The Munsters' Revenge	1981	Don Weis	Television film.	
The Monster Kid: Invitation to Monster Land	1981	Hiroshi Fukutomi		
The Funhouse	1981	Tobe Hooper		
The Muppets Go to the Movies	1981	Peter Harris	"The Nephew of Frankenstein" segment. Television film.	
The House by the Cemetery	1981	Lucio Fulci		
The Monster Kid: The Demon Sword	1982	Hiroshi Fukutomi		
Buenas noches, señor monstruo	1982	Antonio Mercero		
Funny Frankestein	1982	Mario Bianchi	Pornographic parody. Also known as Agnese e... and Agnese e... la dottoressa di campagna.	
Britannia Hospital	1982	Lindsay Anderson		
Dr. Slump: Hoyoyo! Space Adventure	1982	Akinori Nagaoka		
Frankenstein's Mother-in-Law	1983	Trude Herr	Television film.	
Dr. Slump and Arale-chan: The Great Round-the-World Race	1983			
Geek Maggot Bingo	1983	Nick Zedd		
Frankenstein	1984	James Ormerod	Based on the novel. Television film.	
Frankenstein's Great Aunt Tillie	1984	Myron J. Gold		
Frankenstein 90	1984	Alain Jessua		
Mixed Up	1984	Henry Chow		
The Bride	1985	Franc Roddam	Loosely based on the novel.	
Fracchia vs. Dracula	1985	Neri Parenti		
Re-Animator	1985	Stuart Gordon		
Transylvania 6-5000	1985	Rudy De Luca		
Weird Science	1985	John Hughes		
Better Off Dead	1985	Savage Steve Holland		
The Vindicator	1986	Jean-Claude Lord	Also known as Frankenstein 88.	
Gothic	1986	Ken Russell		
Frankenstein	1986	Burt Brinckerhoff	Television film.	
The Ultimate Lover	1986	Thomas Paine	Pornographic parody.	
Wet Science	1986	Flesh Flasher	Pornographic parody of Weird Science.	
GeGeGe no Kitarō: The Great Yōkai War	1986	Osamu Kasai		
Alexander	1986	Bengt Högberg, Travis Preston		
Doctor Penetration	1986	Alex de Renzy	Pornographic parody.	
The Monster Squad	1987	Fred Dekker		
Freckled Max and the Spooks	1987	Juraj Jakubisko		
Scooby-Doo Meets the Boo Brothers	1987	Carl Urbano, Ray Patterson	Television film.	
Noche de terrock y brujas	1987	Luis de Llano		
Monstrosity	1987	Andy Milligan		
RoboCop	1987	Paul Verhoeven		
Weird Fantasy	1987		Pornographic parody. Also known as Sex Machine.	
Robot Carnival	1987	Kôji Morimoto	"Franken's Gears" segment.	
Frankenstein General Hospital	1988	Deborah Romare		
Rowing with the Wind	1988	Gonzalo Suárez		
Scooby-Doo! and the Reluctant Werewolf	1988	Ray Patterson	Television film.	
Howl of the Devil	1988	Paul Naschy		
Waxwork	1988	Anthony Hickox		
Flesh for Frankenstein	1988	Ron Jeremy	Pornographic parody.	
Haunted Summer	1988	Ivan Passer		
Pretty Body: Frankenstein's Love	1988	Takafumi Nagamine		
Scooby-Doo and the Ghoul School	1988	Ray Patterson	Television film.	
Doctor Hackenstein	1988	Richard Clark		
Yong-Gu And Daeng Chiri	1989	Ki-nam Nam		
Beverly Hills Bodysnatchers	1989	Jonathan Mostow		
Frankenstein Unbound	1990	Roger Corman		
Frankenhooker	1990	Frank Henenlotter		
Edward Scissorhands	1990	Tim Burton		
Bride of Re-Animator	1990	Brian Yuzna		
Aquí huele a muerto... (¡Pues yo no he sido!)	1990	Álvaro Sáenz de Heredia		
Khatra	1991	H.N. Singh		
Frankenstein: The College Years	1991	Tom Shadyac	Television film.	
Frankenstein: A Cinematic Scrapbook	1991	Ted Newsom		
The Last Frankenstein	1991	Takeshi Kawamura		
Franky and His Pals	1991	Jerald Cormier		
Frank Enstein	1991	Douglas Richards		
The Addams Family	1991	Barry Sonnenfeld	Lurch character.	
The Maddams Family	1991	Herschel Savage	Pornographic parody of The Addams Family.	
Frankenstein	1992	David Wickes	Based on the novel. Television film.	
The D.P. Man	1992	Jim Enright	Pornographic parody.	
The D.P. Man 2	1992	Jim Enright	Pornographic parody.	
Waxwork II: Lost in Time	1992	Anthony Hickox		
Return from Death	1992	Joe D'Amato	Also known as Frankenstein 2000.	
The Nightmare Before Christmas	1993	Henry Selick		
Haunted	1993	John Magyar		
Atomic Samurai	1993		Also known as Samurai Johnny Frankenstein.	
Leena Meets Frankenstein	1993	Scotty Fox	Pornographic parody.	
Addams Family Values	1993	Barry Sonnenfeld	Lurch character.	
Hollyrock-a-Bye Baby	1993	William Hanna	Television film.	
Frankenhunter	1993		Pornographic parody.	
Frankentickle	1993	Tony Sinclair	Pornographic parody.	
Mary Shelley's Frankenstein	1994	Kenneth Branagh	Based on the novel.	
It's Alive: The True Story of Frankenstein	1994	Richard Brown	Television film. Documentary.	
Frankenstein	1994	Buck Adams	Pornographic parody. Also known as Frankenstein – version X.	
The Pagemaster	1994	Pixote Hunt, Joe Johnston	Monster is cut from the film but appears in the trailers.	
Monster Mash	1995	Joel Cohen, Alec Sokolow	Also known as Frankenstein Sings.	
Here Come the Munsters	1995	Robert Ginty	Television film.	
Tiny Toons' Night Ghoulery	1995	Rich Arons, Michael Gerard, Rusty Mills	"Hold That Duck" segment. Television film.	
Mr. Stitch	1995	Roger Avary	Television film.	
Frankenstein's Planet of Monsters!	1995	Brad Anderson		
The Real Frankenstein: An Untold Story	1995		Television film. Documentary.	
The Munsters' Scary Little Christmas	1996	Ian Emes	Television film.	
Frankenstein and Me	1996	Robert Tinnell		
The Bride of Frank	1996	Steve Ballot		
Dragon Ball: The Path to Power	1996	Shigeyasu Yamauchi	Android 8 character.	
In Search of Frankenstein	1996		Television film. Documentary.	
Tales from the Crypt Presents: Bordello of Blood	1996	Gilbert Adler		
Frankenpenis	1996	Ron Jeremy	Pornographic parody.	
The Creeps	1997	Charles Band	Also known as Deformed Monsters.	
Monster Mania	1997	Kevin Burns	Television film. Documentary.	
Gods and Monsters	1997	Bill Condon		
Curse of the ShadowBorg	1997	John Putch		
Gegege no Kitarō: Yōkai Express! The Phantom Train	1997	Takao Yoshizawa		
Billy Frankenstein	1998	Fred Olen Ray		
Pokémon: The First Movie	1998	Kunihiko Yuyama	Mewtwo character.	
Small Soldiers	1998	Joe Dante		
Lust for Frankenstein	1998	Jesús Franco		
The Footprints of a Spirit	1998	Carlos Rodríguez	Making of The Spirit of the Beehive (1973). Television film.	
Frankenstein Reborn!	1998	David DeCoteau		
Addams Family Reunion	1998	Dave Payne	Lurch character. Television film.	
Bride of Chucky	1998	Ronny Yu		
Alvin and the Chipmunks Meet Frankenstein	1999	Kathi Castillo		
Rock 'N Roll Frankenstein	1999	Brian O'Hara		
She's Alive! Creating the Bride of Frankenstein	1999	David J. Skal	Documentary.	
Hell On Heels	1999	Brad Armstrong	Pornographic parody.	
Double Feature	1999	Jonathan Morgan	Pornographic parody. "Man Made Beast" segment.	
Monster Mash	2000	Guido Manuli		
Boltneck	2000	Mitch Marcus, John Blush	Also known as Big Monster on Campus and Teen Monster.	
Mistress Frankenstein	2000	Zachary Snygg		
Bride of Monster Mania	2000	Brian Anthony, Jerry Decker	Television film. Documentary.	
A Regular Frankie Fan	2000	Scott Mabbutt	Documentary on the fans of The Rocky Horror Picture Show (1975).	
Frankenstein Stalks	2000	David 'The Rock' Nelson		
Transylvania Police: Monster Squad	2000	Ritch Yarber		
Twister: A Musical Catastrophe	2000	Ken Kesey		
Spankenstein	2000	Skye Blue	Pornographic parody.	
Frankenström	2001	Markus Staaf		
Corpse-O-Rama	2001	Vince D'Amato		
Hung Wankenstein	2001	Jim Enright	Pornographic parody.	
Heroes of Horror	2001		Documentary. Television film.	
Let's Go! Anpanman: Anpanman and Small Santa's Christmas	2001			
Rumpenstein's Monster	2001	Peter Wartmark	Pornographic parody.	
May	2002	Lucky McKee		
Lilo & Stitch	2002	Dean DeBlois, Chris Sanders		
Dracula Vs Frankenstein	2002	Tyler Ralston, Marc Slanger		
The Frankenstein Files: How Hollywood Made a Monster	2002	David J. Skal	Documentary.	
Jack Pierce: The Man Behind the Monsters	2002	Scott Essman	Documentary.	
LSD Frankenstein	2002	Germán Magariños		
I Was A Teenage Frankenstein's Roommate	2002	Josh Miller		
Frankenstein, The Musical	2002	Jeffrey Jackson		
Beyond Re-Animator	2003	Brian Yuzna		
Frankenstein: Birth of a Monster	2003	Mary Downes	Documentary with live-action scenes based on some fragments of the novel. Television film.	
Van Helsing	2004	Stephen Sommers		
Frankenstein	2004	Marcus Nispel	Loosely based on the novel. Television film.	
Frankenfish	2004	Mark A.Z. Dippé	Television film.	
Dr. Horror's Erotic House of Idiots	2004	Paul Scrabo		
Cine Gibi: O Filme	2004	José Márcio Nicolosi	"O Caça Sansão" segment.	
Frankenstein vs. the Creature from Blood Cove	2005	William Winckler		
Frankenstein Reborn	2005	Leigh Scott		
Destruction Kings	2005	Chris Seaver		
Frankenthug	2005	Zachary Snygg		
The Beast of Bray Road	2005	Leigh Scott		
Frankenstein & the Werewolf Reborn!	2005	Jeff Burr, David DeCoteau		
Cine Gibi 2	2005	José Márcio Nicolosi	"O Baile Frank" segment.	
Monster Kid Home Movies	2005	Robert Tinnell		
Subject Two	2006	Philip Chidel		
Frankenstein's Bloody Nightmare	2006	John R. Hand		
Puzzlehead	2006	James Bai		
Goolians: A Docu-Comedy	2006	Daniel Roebuck, Wally Wingert		
The Rocky Horror Tribute Show	2006	Robin Lough		
Kreating Karloff	2006	Vatche Arabian		
Frankenstein	2006	Christian Ferrero	Pornographic parody.	
Casper's Scare School	2006	Mark Gravas	Television film.	
Buckystein	2006	Geoff Lafayette		
Lo Strano Caso del Dottor Jekyll e Mister Hyde	2006	Maurizio Simonetti		
Prof. F. Stein oder Ich baue mir meine Traumfrau	2006	Nils Molitor	Pornographic parody.	
Goth Girls: The Return	2007	Josh Maldonado	"Evil of Frankenstein" segment.	
Monster Squad Forever!	2007	Michael Felsher		
Frankenstein	2007	Jed Mercurio	Television film.	
Billy & Mandy's Big Boogey Adventure	2007	Robert Alvarez	Television film.	
Igor	2008	Tony Leondis		
South Park: Imaginationland	2008	Trey Parker	Compilation film of the Imaginationland episodes, with two of them featuring the monster (II and III).	
This Ain't the Munsters XXX	2008	Mike Adams	Pornographic parody of The Munsters.	
Young Frankenstein: It's Alive! Creating a Monster Classic	2008		Documentary.	
Frankenstein the Rapist	2008	Bill Zebub		
Abnormal Attraction	2008	Michael Leavy		
Let's Go! Anpanman: Franken-Robo-kun's Surprised Christmas	2008			
Hells	2008	Amber Lee Connors, Yoshinobu Yamakawa	Steela character.	
House of the Wolf Man	2009	Eben McGarr		
Stan Helsing	2009	Bo Zenga		
Vampire Girl vs. Frankenstein Girl	2009	Yoshihiro Nishimura, Naoyuki Tomomatsu		
Hilarious House of Frightenstein: Igormania	2009			
Frankenhood	2009	Blaxwell Smart		
Creep Creepersin's Frankenstein	2009	Creep Creepersin		
Frankenstein Unlimited	2009	King-Wei Chu, Matthew Forbes, Martin Gauthier		
Frankenpimp	2009	Vivita, Tony Watt, John A. Kelly		
Mary Shelley's Frankenstein: A Documentary	2009	Liam Dale	Documentary.	
Bordello Death Tales	2009	Alan Ronald	"Stitchgirl" segment.	
Super Kamen Rider Den-O & Decade NEO Generations: The Onigashima Battleship	2009	Ryuta Tasaki	Riki character.	
The Frankenstein Syndrome	2010	Sean Tretta	Also known as The Prometheus Project.	
Bikini Frankenstein	2010	Fred Olen Ray		
Exquisite Corpse	2010	Scott David Russell		
Frankenstein Rising	2010	Eric Swelstad		
Tender Son: The Frankenstein Project	2010	Kornél Mundruczó		
Spark of Being	2010	Bill Morrison		
Creature Feature	2010	Lizzy Borden	Pornographic parody.	
Mou kaette kita yo!! Kaibutsu-kun subete shinsaku special	2010		Television film.	
Night on Has Been Mountain	2010	Tim Rasmussen Jr.		
Monster Brawl	2011	Jesse Thomas Cook		
Frankenstein: Day of the Beast	2011	Ricardo Islas	Loosely based on the novel.	
National Theatre Live: Frankenstein	2011	Danny Boyle	Based on the novel.	
Frankenstein's Wedding	2011	Colin Teague	Based on the novel. Television film.	
Frankenstein	2011	Jordan Salkil		
Chillerama	2011	Adam Green	"The Diary Of Anne Frankenstein" segment.	
Kaibutsu-kun: The Movie	2011	Yoshihiro Nakamura		
Kaibutsu-kun: Episode 0	2011		Television film.	
Twilight the Porno and Other XXX Parodies	2011	Jim Powers	Pornographic parody. "Frankenstein XXX" segment.	
Pox	2011	Lisa Hammer		
The Addams Family XXX	2011	Rodney Moore	Pornographic parody of The Addams Family.	
Dr. Frankencunt	2011		Pornographic parody.	
Frankenweenie	2012	Tim Burton		
Hotel Transylvania	2012	Genndy Tartakovsky		
Mockingbird Lane	2012	Bryan Singer	Television film.	
Fuckenstein	2012	Joanna Angel	Pornographic parody.	
1313: Frankenqueen	2012	David DeCoteau		
Frankenstein: A Modern Myth	2012	Adam Low	Television film. Documentary.	
Alan Smithee's Frankenstein	2012	Germán Magariños		
Jeff Dunham: Minding the Monsters	2012	Manny Rodriguez, Matthew McNeil		
Ninjas vs. Monsters	2012	Justin Timpane		
The Pirates! In an Adventure with Scientists!	2012	Peter Lord, Jeff Newitt	Also known as The Pirates! Band of Misfits.	
Frankenstein's Army	2013	Richard Raaphorst		
The Frankenstein Theory	2013	Andrew Weiner		
Frankenstein's Hungry Dead	2013	Richard Griffin	Also known as Frankenstein's Wax Museum of the Hungry Dead.	
Dragon Ball Z: Battle of Gods	2013	Masahiro Hosoda	Android 8 character.	
Green Frankenstein	2013	Jörg Buttgereit		
Epitaph: Bread and Salt	2013	Nathyn Masters		
Corpsing	2013	Jeff Monahan		
Mighty Mighty Monsters in Halloween Havoc	2013	Adam Wood	Television film.	
Mighty Mighty Monsters in New Fears Eve	2013	Adam Wood, Joesph Holt	Television film.	
Anpanman: Revive Banana Island!	2013	Hiroyuki Yano		
I, Frankenstein	2014	Stuart Beattie		
Army of Frankensteins	2014	Ryan Bellgardt		
Frankenstein's Monster	2014	Syd Lance		
Frankenstein and the Vampyre: A Dark and Stormy Night	2014	Philip Smith	Television film. Documentary.	
Closer to God	2014	Billy Senese		
Scooby-Doo! Frankencreepy	2014	Paul McEvoy, Sungku Cho, Youngwon Jeong		
Beauty Secrets	2014	Nathyn Masters		
Possessed	2014	Sam Orti		
Monster Beach	2014	Patrick Crawley	Widget character.	
Monster Madness: The Golden Age of the Horror Film	2014	Jeff Herberger	Documentary.	
Monster High: Freaky Fusion	2014	Sylvain Blais, William Lau		
Frankenstein	2015	Bernard Rose	Loosely based on the novel. Also known as FRANKƐN5TƐ1N.	
Patchwork	2015	Tyler MacIntyre		
Frankenstein vs. The Mummy	2015	Damien Leone		
Hotel Transylvania 2	2015	Genndy Tartakovsky		
The Lazarus Effect	2015	David Gelb		
Victor Frankenstein	2015	Paul McGuigan		
The Empire of Corpses	2015	Ryôtarô Makihara		
Director's Commentary: Terror of Frankenstein	2015	Tim Kirk	A spoof commentary on Terror of Frankenstein (1977).	
Frankenstein's Patchwork Monster	2015	Emil Novak		
Frances Stein	2015	P.J. Woodside		
Frankenstein: The Metal Opera - Live	2015	Alan Mandel		
Beach Blanket Frankenstein	2015	Dan McCloy		
Tales of Dracula	2015	Joe DeMuro, Thomas Rice		
Jack Pierce, the Maker of Monsters	2015	Strephon Taylor	Documentary.	
Monsterz	2015	Shawn Welling		
The Sick and Twisted Tale of Frankenstein	2015	Phil Nichols		
Mighty Mighty Monsters in Pranks for the Memories	2015	Adam Wood, Jimi Cuell	Television film.	
League of Frankenstein	2015	Dick Bush	Pornographic parody.	
Christmas at Dracula's	2015	Simon Mckeon		
The Crawlspace: Frankenstein's Legend	2015	Dusty W. Fleischman	Television film.	
Party Monsters	2015	Whitney Requa	Television film.	
Frankenstein Created Bikers	2016	James Bickert		
Haunted Transylvania	2016	Pippa Seymour		
Dracula vs. Frankenstein's Monster	2016	Zachary Keane		
Sharkenstein	2016	Mark Polonia		
Frankenstein from the Royal Ballet	2016	Ross MacGibbon, Liam Scarlett	Based on the novel. Television film.	
Monster Family	2017	Holger Tappe		
Herbert West: Reanimator	2017	Ivan Zuccon		
FrankenThug	2017	Richard Tanner		
Terra X Mythos Frankenstein	2017	Oliver Halmburger		
Mary Shelley	2017	Haifaa Al-Mansour		
Frankenstein in a Women's Prison	2017	Jeff Leroy		
Sherlock Holmes vs. Frankenstein	2017	Gautier Cazenave		
Hacked Horror Film Massacre	2017	Angus Simon	"Lust of Dracula" segment.	
Evil Bong 666	2017	Charles Band		
The Unhandymen	2017	Steve Oakley		
Escape from Mr. Lemoncello's Library	2017	Scott McAboy	Television film.	
Hotel Transylvania 3: Summer Vacation	2018	Genndy Tartakovsky		
Haunted Transylvania 2	2018	Pippa Seymour		
Tales of Frankenstein	2018	Donald F. Glut		
Baby Frankenstein	2018	Jon YonKondy		
Frankenstein's Creature	2018	Sam Ashurst		
Il Corpo Del Duce	2018	Ryan Ardito		
Wolfman's Got Nards	2018	Andre Gower	Documentary.	
Fran K.: Frankenstein	2018	Rob Schmidt	Television film.	
Bad Monsters	2018	Amanda Neyard		
Canavar Gibi: Türk İşi Frankeştayn	2018	Özgür Bakar		
The Angry World of Brian Webster	2018	Jim Heffernan		
Depraved	2019	Larry Fessenden		
Haunted Transylvania 3	2019	Pippa Seymour		
The Gravedigger	2019	Erynn Dalton		
Frankenstein: Rise of a Monster	2019	Kim Harrington	Television film. Documentary.	
Frankenstein Unplugged	2019	Enrico Parenti	Documentary.	
Alive	2019		TV pilot.	
Doctor Stein	2019	Joe Pinkerton		
The Frankenstein Monster Project	2019	Steven Aguilera		
The Addams Family	2019	Greg Tiernan, Conrad Vernon	Lurch character.	
Lil' Monsters	2019	James Snider		
Let's Go! Anpanman: Sparkle! Princess Vanilla of the Land of Ice Cream	2019	Hiroyuki Yano		
Spookiz: The Movie	2019	Kim Bong-ho, Anna Paik		
Super Monsters Furever Friends	2019	Steve Ball, Jacob Joice	Television film.	
A Nightmare Wakes	2020	Nora Unkel		
Frankenpimp's Revenge: The Romeo and Juliet Massacre	2020	Tony Watt, Raffi Atamian, Francesco De Francesco		
Peter Cushing: The Man Who Created Frankenstein	2020	Don Fearney	Documentary.	
RiffTrax Presents: Frankenstein's Daughter	2020	Mary Jo Pehl, Bridget Jones		
Big Parade of Horror	2020	Maxwell Whiteman	Documentary.	
Death of a Ladies' Man	2020	Matt Bissonnette		
The Last Frankenstein	2021	David Weaver		
Frankenstein Ruins Halloween	2021	Chip Bryant		
Haunted Transylvania: Party Like Frankenstein	2021	Alejandro Aitana		
The Great Yokai War: Guardians	2021	Takashi Miike		
Frankenstein	2021	Costas Zapas		
Mashup at the Movies	2021	Dean Houlihan	"Day of the Frankenstein" segment.	
Boris Karloff: The Man Behind the Monster	2021	Thomas Hamilton	Documentary.	
Monster Family 2	2021	Holger Tappe		
The New Years Baby	2021	Chip Bryant		
The Ultimate Sacrifice	2021	Leon Cole		
Hillbilly Frankenstein from Hell	2021	Chaz Buchanan		
The Addams Family 2	2021	Conrad Vernon, Greg Tiernan	Lurch character.	
Help! My In-Laws Are Vampires!	2021	Volfango De Biasi		
Space Jam: A New Legacy	2021	Malcolm D. Lee	Frankenstein Jr. character.	
The Abominations of Frankenstein	2021	Sophie Godin		
Hotel Transylvania: Transformania	2022	Derek Drymon, Jennifer Kluska		
The Munsters	2022	Rob Zombie		
HeBGB TV	2022	Eric Griffin, Adam Lenhart, Jake Mcclellan		
Beneath the Old Dark House	2022	Matt Cloude		
Weird	2022	Dennis Smithers Jr.		
Frankenstein: We've Conquered the Death	2022	Cîmpean Rares Gabriel		
4th Wall Players Presents: Frankenstein	2022	Spike Wilson		
Adam Heatherly's Frankenstein!	2022	Adam Heatherly		
Monsters in the Closet	2022	Spencer Snygg, Zachary Snygg		
Kaiketsu Zorori: Lalala Star Tanjou	2022	Takahide Ogata		
The Angry Black Girl and Her Monster	2023	Bomani J. Story		
Poor Things	2023	Yorgos Lanthimos		
English the Movie: 4Ever After	2023	Mj Mularski		
Amityville Frankenstein	2023	Nick Box		
Blood Inheritance	2023	M. Benjamin Woodall		
Frankenstein	2023	Joe Lobianco		
Las Vegas Frankenstein	2023	Tom Devlin		
Santastein	2023	Manuel Camilion, Benjamin Edelman		
The Boulet Brothers' Halfway to Halloween TV Special	2023	Dracmorda Boulet, Swanthula Boulet	Television film. "Frankensteinfeld" segment.	
Teddy Told Me To	2023	Tom Devlin		
Chucky Meets Frankenstein	2023	Tom Zarzecki		
Lisa Frankenstein	2024	Zelda Williams		
Frankenstein: Legacy	2024	Paul Dudbridge		
Beetlejuice Beetlejuice	2024	Tim Burton		
Monster Mash	2024	Jose Prendes		
Frankenstein Theater: The Magic Sword	2024	Charles Dewandeler		
Dahmer & Frankenstein: Closer Than We Think	2024	BC Fourteen	Documentary.	
Bad Ben 14: Frankenstein	2024	Nigel Bach		
Lilo & Stitch	2025	Dean Fleischer Camp		
Frankenstein	2025	Guillermo del Toro	Based on the novel.	
Dead Lover	2025	Grace Glowicki		
Edge of Chaos	2025	Ron Ford	"Frankenstein's Confession" segment.	
The Abominations of Frankenstein	2025	Eric Yoder		
Grandma's Apartment	2025	Levi Peretic		
Frank & Zed	2025	Jesse Blanchard		
Stitch Head	2025	Steve Hudson		
I Am Frankelda	2025	Arturo and Roy Ambriz, Mireya Mendoza		
Super Happy Fun Clown	2025	Patrick Rea		
Four Nights in Fear Forest	2025	Mark Polonia		
Frankenstein: The Anatomy Lesson	2025	Guillermo del Toro, Javier Soto	Making of Frankenstein (2025).	
The Bride!	2026	Maggie Gyllenhaal		
Doctor Imperfect and the Perfect Man	2026	Marco Carlson	Upcoming.	
Bride of Frankenstein	2026	Louisa Warren	Also known as Bride of Frankenstein Awakens.	
Frankenstein's Bride	2026	Erica Duke		
The Monster Hop	2027	Nicholas Marcello	Upcoming.	
Frankenstein		Micah Ignacio	Upcoming.	
Monster Time Machine		Milko Davis	Upcoming.	
Frankenstein in Romania		Radu Jude	Upcoming.	

== List of short films ==
Film	Year	Director(s)	Notes	Ref.
Frankenstein	1910	J. Searle Dawley	Based on the novel.	
Il mostro di Frankenstein	1921	Eugenio Testa	Lost film. Based on the novel.	
Boo!	1932	Albert DeMond		
Mickey's Gala Premier	1933	Burt Gillett	Boris Karloff's monster appears as a celebrity caricature.	
Betty Boop's Penthouse	1933	Dave Fleischer, Willard Bowsky		
Toyland Premiere	1934	Walter Lantz, Manuel Moreno		
Wax Works	1934	Walter Lantz, Manuel Moreno		
The Inventors	1934	Al Christie		
Hollywood Capers	1935	Jack King		
Two Hearts in Wax Time	1935			
Midnight Blunders	1936	Del Lord		
Porky's Road Race	1937	Frank Tashlin		
Have You Got Any Castles?	1938	Frank Tashlin, Friz Freleng		
G-Man Jitters	1939	Eddie Donnelly, Connie Rasinski		
Porky's Movie Mystery	1939	Robert Clampett		
Sniffles and the Bookworm	1939	Chuck Jones		
Frankenstein	1940	Glenn H. Alvey Jr.	Lost film.	
Third Dimensional Murder	1941	George Sidney	Also known as Murder in 3-D.	
Hollywood Steps Out	1941	Tex Avery		
Sweet Spirits of Nighter	1941	Del Lord		
Frankenstein's Cat	1942	Mannie Davis		
What's Cookin' Doc?	1944	Bob Clampett, Friz Freleng		
Hare Tonic	1945	Chuck Jones		
The Great Piggy Bank Robbery	1946	Robert Clampett		
Fortune Hunters	1946	Connie Rasinski		
The Jail Break	1946	Mannie Davis		
Old Manor House	1948	Harold Mack		
Boos in the Nite	1950	Izzy Sparber, Myron Waldman		
King Tut's Tomb	1950	Mannie Davis		
Torticola contre Frankensberg	1952	Paul Paviot		
Water, Water Every Hare	1952	Chuck Jones		
Return of the Wolf Man	1957	Donald F. Glut		
Frankenstein Meets Dracula	1957	Donald F. Glut		
Return of the Monster Maker	1958	Donald F. Glut		
The Revenge of Dracula	1958	Donald F. Glut		
The Frankenstein Story	1958	Donald F. Glut		
The Teenage Frankenstein Meets the Teenage Werewolf	1959	Donald F. Glut		
The Teenage Frankenstein	1959	Donald F. Glut		
Magoo Meets Frankenstein	1959	Abe Levitow, Gil Turner		
Slave of the Vampire	1959	Donald F. Glut		
Franken-Stymied	1961	Jack Hannah		
Monster Rumble	1961	Donald F. Glut		
Dr. Devil and Mr. Hare	1964	Robert McKimson		
The Tomb of Frankenstein	1964	Roy Spence		
How to Make an Athlete	1964	Bob Mizer	Lost film.	
Dr. Faggerty’s Strange Experiment	1965	Bob Mizer	Lost film.	
Castle of Terrors	1965	Harry Nadler		
Lurk	1965	Rudy Burckhardt		
The Monster Master	1966	Cosmo Anzilotti, Ralph Bakshi		
Monster of Ceremonies	1966	Paul J. Smith		
Dr. Bigelow's Monster	1966	Bob Mizer	Lost film.	
Shrinkenstein	1967			
Inspector Klutz Saves the Day	1967	Scott Spiegel		
Dick Digit	1967		TV pilot.	
Frankenstein Cherie	1967		Lost film.	
Psychedelic Monster	1968	Bob Mizer	Lost film. Also known as Psychedelic Frankenstein.	
Isabell, a dream	1968	Luigi Cozzi		
Angelic Frankenstein	1969	Bob Mizer	Lost film.	
Hollow-My-Weenie, Dr. Frankenstein	1970		Pornographic parody. Also known as Frankenstein de Sade.	
Making of a Monster	1971	Bob Mizer	Lost film.	
Dr. Doty's Creation	1971	Bob Mizer	Lost film.	
The Mad Baker	1972	Ted Petok		
Frank Stein	1972	Ivan Zulueta		
Frank Film	1973	Caroline Mouris, Frank Mouris		
Scientist and the Demon	1973	Bob Mizer	Lost film.	
Dolly Mixture	1974	George Harrison Marks		
The Uninvited Visitor	1975	Dave Herring		
Dr. Schulz's Manikin	1975	Bob Mizer	Lost film.	
The Return of the Frankenstein Monster	1976	Walt Daugherty		
Witch's Night Out	1978	John Leach	Television film.	
Frankenstein Walks Again	1978	Scott Allen Nollen		
Bride of Frankenstein	1978	Scott Allen Nollen		
Franco-Frankenstein	1978	Lucio Fulci		
The Halloween That Almost Wasn't	1979	Bruce Bilson	Television film. Also known as The Night Dracula Saved the World.	
The Flintstones' New Neighbors	1980	Carl Urbano	Television film.	
A Day with the Monster	1980	Scott Allen Nollen		
The Flintstones: Wind-Up Wilma	1981	Carl Urbano, Chris Cuddington	Television film.	
The Flintstones: Jogging Fever	1981	Ray Patterson	Television film.	
The Flintstones: Fred's Final Fling	1981	Ray Patterson	Television film.	
Frankenstein: La véritable histoire	1981	Roland Portiche		
Le ravissement de Frank N. Stein	1982	Georges Schwizgebel		
Treasure of the Haunted House	1983	Mark S. Esposito		
Frankenweenie	1984	Tim Burton		
Horror Heaven	1984	Jörg Buttgereit		
Frankenstein's Brain	1985	Fred Olen Ray		
Frankenstein Punk	1986	Eliana Fonseca, Cao Hamburger		
The Night of the Living Duck	1988	Greg Ford		
Frankenstein by Moisés Neto - Silent Version	1989	Moisés Neto		
Edison's Frankenstein	1990	Robert David		
Claymation Comedy of Horrors	1991	Barry Bruce		
Frankenstein vs. Sodom Insane	1991	David 'The Rock' Nelson		
Dracula vs. Sodom Insane	1991	David 'The Rock' Nelson		
The Munsters: The Lost Episode	1991	Peter Gust	Documentary.	
Follow That Goblin!	1992	Jonathan Lubell		
Monster in My Pocket: The Big Scream	1992	Don Lusk	Television film.	
Frankenstein	1992	John Schnall		
House of Horror	1993	James Rolfe		
The Adventures of Janet: Janet vs. Frankenstein	1993	David 'The Rock' Nelson		
Gary Larson's Tales from the Far Side	1994	Marv Newland	Television film.	
Runaway Brain	1995	Chris Bailey		
Shyness	1996	Les Drew		
Elvira's Superstition	1997	Mix Ryan		
Portable Generators	1997	Bob Willems		
Frankenstein 99	1999	José Van Sainz		
Dracula XXI	2000	Paul Raila		
Frankenbabe	2001	Tim Aldridge		
Web Premiere Toons: The Pitch	2001	Ric Heitzman		
Frankenthumb	2002	David Bourla		
Fast Film	2003	Virgil Widrich		
Remote Possibilities	2003	Eric W. Schwartz		
Kiss of Frankenstein	2003	George Kuchar		
Das FrankenStein Prinzip	2003	Ioanes H. Sinderman		
Red Riding Hood Meets Frankenstein	2003	Ricky Lewis Jr.		
Lil Creepers	2003	Brian Byers, Donald Hacker		
An Imperfect Solution: A Tale of the Re-Animator	2003	Christian Matzke		
Dracenstein	2005	Bill Flowers, Tom Priestley		
The Fury of Frau Frankenstein	2005	George Kuchar		
The Worst Date	2005	Mark Ackland, Riccardo Durante		
The Caregiver	2006	Dave Paige		
Frankenstein JR.	2006	Asif Ahmed		
Frankenstein Junior: Director Fan's Cut	2006	Franco Masselli		
Movie Monster Insurance	2006	Paula Haifley		
Making the Monster: Special Makeup Effects Frankenstein Monster Makeup	2007	Scott Essman		
Frankenstein, Or: The Modern Prometheus	2007	Mark Jowett		
Monsters in Autumn	2007	Charlie Cline		
Wacky Races Forever	2007	Mark Banker	TV pilot. Big Gruesome character.	
Monster's Comedy Roast of Satan	2007	Jim Bruce, Tom Griffin, Brian McNett, John Patrick Nelson		
Frankenstein vs. the Wolfman in 3-D	2008	Colin Clarke		
Monster Kids	2008	Scott Essman		
Down in the Dark	2008	Daljit Kalsi Jr.		
Back to Life	2008	Mike Salva		
Herr Frankenstein	2009	Noel Brady		
Spooky Bats and Scaredy Cats	2009	Nathan Smith, Christopher Robin Miller	Television film.	
Frankenstein encore	2009	Alex Baladi, Isabelle Nouzha		
Dr. Shocker's Halloween Spooktacular	2009	Daniel Roebuck, Chuck Williams		
The Fall of the House of Hall	2009	Jim Feeley		
The United Monster Talent Agency	2010	Greg Nicotero		
Scared Shrekless	2010	Gary Trousdale, Raman Hui	Television film.	
Frankensteinin lapsi	2010	Mikael Palsio		
Wayward Frankenstein	2010	Dylan K. Narang		
The Frank-Can-Stein Monster	2010	Cameron McCasland		
Terror Phone II: The Legend of Rakenstein	2010	Matt Maiellaro, Dave Willis		
Dr. Frankenstein's Interns	2010	Sara Mitchell		
Zombies Are My Neighbors	2011	Aaron Hudson		
The Frank Job	2011	Zac Cavaliero		
Frankenstein vs. Hitler	2011	Ace Fronton		
Trick 'r Treat: Making Friends	2011	Michael Dougherty		
Crazy Dracula Spring Break Weekend	2011	Matt Granger, Mikey Granger		
The Bride of Vernon	2011	Calvin Dyson		
The Monster Frankenstein	2011	Holt Bailey, Brian Steele		
Frankencock	2012	William Coleman		
The Dark Side of Frankenstein	2012	Flavio Sciolè		
Frankenstein's Fatal Flying Guillotine	2012	Ryan Meade		
Daughter of Werebitch Meets Skankenstein	2012	James Christopher		
Sherlock Holmes vs Frankenstein	2012	Gautier Cazenave		
Frankenstein's Sorbid Lover	2012	Emma Mary Gover		
The Tale of the Curious and Confused Monster	2012	Jim Zounis		
Darling Pet Munkee Presents: Creature Double Feature	2012	Michael J. Epstein, Chelsea Spear		
Doctor Shocker's Monster Campaign Ads 2012	2012	Daniel Roebuck		
Captain Sparky vs. the Flying Saucers	2013	Mark Waring		
Frankenstein's Master	2013	Benjamin Stark		
A Monsterous Holiday	2013	Gordon Crum		
Ellie Loves Frank	2013	Audrey Brown		
Frankenstein's Monster	2013	Michael Heerlein		
Frankenstein Goes Out	2013	Flavio Sciolè		
Frankulstein	2014	Marie Lechevallier		
Monster School: A New Sitcom	2014	Kyle Cunningham		
Frankenchick	2014	Fabian Montes-Sanchez		
O Frankenstein!	2014	Frank Tovar		
Frankenstein Cannot Be Stopped	2014	Larry Fessenden		
Frankenstein	2014	Joe Kidd		
Saint Frankenstein	2015	Scooter McCrae		
Frankenstein's Light	2015	Saad Nawab		
Victoria	2015	Alex Murfey		
Bullying Is for the Birds	2015	Erica Benedikty		
Be My Frankenstein	2015	Dallin Cerva		
White Privilege Frankenstein	2015	Ken Dashow, Chris Carfizzi		
Frankenstein	2015	Boris Vukovic		
Noblesse: The Beginning of Destruction	2015			
Happy Halloween with Dr. Gangrene	2015	Cameron McCasland		
He Lives	2015	Ananda Ortanez		
Experiment	2016	Sergey Lesovoy		
I Am Alone	2016	Joshua Evola		
Monsters Anonymous	2016	Jeremy London		
Monsters Anonymous	2016	Steve Gast		
Creatures of Whitechapel	2016	Jonathan Martin		
Head For Film	2016	Ron Zlatkin		
Frankenstein: Heart of a Champion	2016	Mark Yancey		
Meet the Frankensteins	2016	Erika Curry		
The Weary Traveler	2016	Chris R. Notarile	Based on some fragments of the novel.	
Frankenstein	2016	Fawn		
Daughter of Frankenstein	2016	Andy Johnston		
Bloody Henry	2016	Jean-Paul DiSciscio		
Frankenstein Therapy	2016	Justin William Phillips		
Apple: Frankie's Holiday	2016	Lance Acord		
Noblesse: Awakening	2016	Kenichi Matsuzawa, Shunsuke Tada		
The Case of the Missing Bike	2016		Uncle Grandpa mini episode/short.	
The Origin of Frankenstein	2016		Uncle Grandpa mini episode/short.	
Frankenstein's Frankenstein	2017	Amanda Dickman, Jennifer Li		
Dr. Frankenfuck's Fist Lab	2017		Pornographic parody.	
Frankenstein in a Women's Prison	2017	Richard Griffin		
Welcome to Jackshire County	2017	Kevin Aaron Vazquez		
Kaibutsu ga, Umareta Hi	2017	Ryo Okawara	Promotional short for Frankenstein in Love TV series.	
Frank	2018	Cliff Allen		
Frankenstein Savior of the Zombie Apocalypse	2018	Dave Borges		
Freakenstein	2018	Matthew Mark Hunter		
The Reckoning of Darkness	2018	Christopher Kulikowski		
A Frankenstein for the 20th Century	2019	Dima Ballin	Documentary.	
Frankie Meets Frankenstein	2019	Stephanie Paris		
Frankenstein's Monster's Monster, Frankenstein	2019	Daniel Gray Longino	Television film.	
Frank	2019	Cam Gavinski		
Erica	2019	Chrystian Tracey		
The Moon, The Bat, The Monster	2019	Robbie Dias		
Frank & Mary	2019	Paul Williams		
DC Showcase: Sgt. Rock	2019	Bruce Timm		
HA: Horrors Anonymous	2019	Andrew Reynolds, Patrick Weeks		
Frankenstew	2020	Hudson Ludy		
Freakenstein 2: Long Live the Freaks	2020	Matthew Mark Hunter		
A Book and Its Cover	2020	Nyokabi Macharia		
Universal Horror Strikes Back!	2020			
Quaranstein	2020	Multiple directors		
Birth of Frankenstein's Monster	2020	Faton Millanaj		
Frank	2020	Starina Johnson		
The Bride of Frankenstein	2020	Lampros Kordolaimis		
Frankenstein’s Vote	2020	Douglas Tait, Isabel Cueva		
Slashing on By	2020	Samuel Rodriguez		
Myth	2020	Brielle Carroll		
Adam in aeternum	2021	Pedro Jaén R.		
Operación Frankenstein	2022	Jose Maria Fernandez De Vega		
Closure Corps	2022	William R. Coughlan		
FrankenDivine	2022	Sailor Galaviz		
Silas	2022	J. Søren Viuf		
Cool Book Club	2022	Mikyla Bordner		
Frankenstein's Daughter	2022	Tony Laudati		
The Tragedy of Frankenstein	2022	Lucas Koford		
Frankie and Benny	2023	Markus Meedt		
Adam	2023	Mani Sachdeva		
Frankenstein	2023	Cameron Litvinchuk		
Frankenstein	2024	Zachary Zurcher		
Meet the Frankensteins	2024	Randy W. Schmidt		
Monsters Unchained: The Frankenstein Experiment	2024	Gregory Hall		
Igor Unplugged	2024	Bill Thomas		
Frankenbabes from Beyond the Grave	2025			
Frankenism	2025	Robert Ajay		
Baby	2025	Bárbara Noely		
Monster Friends	2026	Buddy Keys		
My Sweet Frankenstein		Joseph Wendrich	Upcoming.	
Electric Hearts		Fernanda Ramos	Upcoming.	

== List of TV series ==
TV series	Episodes (total)	Episodes (with the monster)	Year(s)	Director(s)	Notes	Ref.
The Adventures of the Spirit	5	5	1963	Donald F. Glut	TV mini series.	
The Munsters	70	70	1964–1966	Ed Haas, Norm Liebmann		
The Addams Family	64	64	1964–1966	David Levy	Lurch character.	
Milton the Monster	26	26	1965–1967	Beverly Arnold		
Frankenstein Jr. and The Impossibles	18	18	1966–1968	Joseph Barbera, William Hanna		
The Shrimpenstein Show			1967–1968	Michael Dormer, Lee Teacher	Local TV show of KCAL-TV.	
The Monster Kid	50	50	1968–1969	Masaaki Ōsumi		
Wacky Races	17	17	1968–1969	William Hanna, Joseph Barbera	Big Gruesome character.	
Dark Shadows	1225	82	1968	Dan Curtis	Adam character (appears only in 1968).	
Groovie Goolies	16	16	1970–1971	Hal Sutherland		
Sabrina the Teenage Witch	61	14	1970–1974	Hal Sutherland		
The Electric Company	780		1971–1977	Henry Behar, Bob Schwarz, John Tracy		
The Hilarious House of Frightenstein	130		1971			
The Addams Family	16	16	1973	David Levy	Lurch character.	
Monster Squad	13	13	1976	Stanley Ralph Ross, R.S. Allen, Harvey Bullock		
Struck by Lightning	11	11	1979			
Highcliffe Manor	6	6	1979	Nick Havinga		
The Flintstone Comedy Show	180	18	1980–1981	Ray Patterson, George Gordon, Rudy Zamora		
Ghost Samba: BAKERAMA HORROR SHOW! MON MON MONSTER	46		1980-1981	Takashi Okumura		
The Monster Kid	94	94	1980–1982			
Drak Pack	16	16	1980	Chris Cuddington		
Dr. Slump – Arale-chan	243	9	1981-1986			
Uchuusen Sagittarius	77	5	1986-1987	Kazuyoshi Yokota		
Dragon Ball	153	10	1986–1989		Android 8 character.	
Dr. Krankenstein	8		1987–1988	Frank Alsema		
Frankenstein's Aunt	7	7	1987	Juraj Jakubisko		
Anpanman	1640	49	1988	Akinori Nagaoka, Shunji Ōga		
The Munsters Today	72	72	1988–1991	Multiple directors		
Gravedale High	13	13	1990–1991	David Kirschner		
Wake, Rattle, and Roll	50		1990–1991	Doug Rogers, Steven J. Santos		
Little Dracula	13		1991			
The Addams Family	21	21	1992–1993	Robert Alvarez, Don Lusk, Ray Patterson, Carl Urbano	Lurch character.	
Weird Science	88	88	1994–1998	Alan Cross, Tom Spezialy		
Monster Force	13	13	1994	Chris Schouten		
Darkstalkers	13	13	1995	Dora Case, J.K. Kim, Sue Peters		
Big Bad Beetleborgs	89	50	1996–1998	Gabe Torres		
Cybersix	8	8	1996	José Luis Massa		
Duchi and Puku	26		1996	Kim Jaewon		
Sprechstunde bei Dr. Frankenstein	54		1997–1998	Peter Hill		
House of Frankenstein	2	2	1997	Peter Werner	TV mini series.	
The New Addams Family	65	65	1998–1999	George Erschbamer, Ed Anders	Lurch character.	
Toonsylvania	21	21	1998–2000	Bill Kopp		
Monster Farm	52		1998	Taylor Grant		
Mina and the Count	6		1999	Rob Renzetti		
Cybersix	13	13	1999	Carlos Meglia, Carlos Trillo		
Li'l Horrors	52		2000–2001	Ralph Strasser		
Argento Soma	25		2000-2002	Kazuyoshi Katayama		
Rave Master	51		2001-2002	Takashi Watanabe	Franken Billy character.	
Frankenstein	2	2	2004	Kevin Connor	TV mini series. Based on the novel.	
Minoriteam	20	20	2005–2006	Adam De La Peña, Todd James, Peter Girardi		
Mahou Sentai Magiranger	49	18	2005-2006		Victory General Branken	
One Piece	1155	312	2005		Franky character (first appeared in 2005).	
Gruesomestein's Monsters	104		2005	Mark Ackland, Riccardo Durante		
Frankenstein's Cat	30	30	2007–2008	Curtis Jobling		
Princess Resurrection	26	26	2007-2008	Masayuki Sakoi	Flandre, Francisca, Francette, Flanders, Francine characters.	
Transylvania Television	37		2007	Michael J. Heagle, Gordon Smuder		
Soul Eater	51	39	2008–2009			
Kamen Rider Kiva	48	31	2008–2009	Shotaro Ishinomori	Riki character.	
Stitch!	85	85	2008-2015	Fumihiro Yoshimura, Masami Hata	Stitch character. Season 2 episode 3 Dracula, Jr. also features Frankenstein's monster himself.	
Midnite Mausoleum			2009	Blake Powell	Franklin character.	
Casper's Scare School	52		2009–2012			
Monster High	175	175	2010–2018			
Mary Shelley's Frankenhole	20	20	2010–2017	Dino Stamatopoulos		
The Monster Kid	9	9	2010	Satoru Nakajima, Shunsuke Kariyama, Jun Ishio		
Uncle Grandpa	153	36	2010–2017	Peter Browngardt		
Living with Frankenstein	7	7	2012	Deborah Baxtrom		
Hemlock Grove	33	31	2013	Brian McGreevy	Shelley Godfrey character.	
Blood Lad	11	5	2013	Shigeyuki Miya	TV mini series.	
Creature Commandos	3	3	2014	David L. Mendel	TV mini series.	
Frankenstein, MD	24		2014	Brett Register		
Soul Eater Not!	12	3	2014	Masakazu Hashimoto	TV mini series.	
Penny Dreadful	27	23	2014–2016	John Logan		
The Frankenstein Chronicles	12		2015–2017	Barry Langford, Benjamin Ross		
House of Monsters	2	2	2015	Dawn Brown		
Phillip Human	10	10	2015		TV mini series.	
Spookiz	26	20	2015			
Second Chance	11	11	2016	Rand Ravich		
Mikey Sevier scores Frankenstein!!!	19	19	2016	Mikey Sevier		
Code: Realize ~Guardian of Rebirth~	13	13	2017–2018	Hideyo Yamamoto	Cardia Beckford character.	
Wacky Races	78	31	2017–2019	Rebecca Himot, Tramm Wigzell	Big Gruesome character.	
Hotel Transylvania: The Series	52	52	2017–2020	Mark Steinberg		
Frankenstein in Love	10	10	2017	Shunsuke Kariyama	TV mini series.	
Junkenstein's Revenge	6	6	2017	Matthew Sereno	TV mini series.	
Fate/Apocrypha	25	5	2017	Yoshiyuki Asai		
Super Monsters	32	32	2017	Steve Ball, Jacob Joice		
Vampirina: Ghoul Girls Rock!	15		2018-2019			
Monster Beach	48	35	2019	Patrick Crawley	Widget character.	
Vampirina	75	11	2019	Chris Nee	Frankenstein, Frankenstasy, Frankie Bolt, Frankie Stein, Bride Of Frankenstein characters.	
You're Not a Monster	10	4	2019	Frank Lesser		
Frankensitter	8		2020	Morgan Toll		
Noblesse	13		2020	Shunsuke Tada, Yasutaka Yamamoto		
Sleepy Princess in the Demon Castle	12	12	2020	Mitsue Yamazaki		
Miss Marilyn Macabre's Saturday Shockers	11	11	2021			
The Patrick Star Show	61	8	2021	David Cunningham, Sherm Cohen	SpongeMonster character.	
We Will Be Monsters	4	4	2021	Rick Famuyiwa		
Frankelda's Book of Spooks	5	5	2021	Arturo Ambriz, Roy Ambriz	Frankelda character.	
Happy House of Frightenstein	20		2021	Ken Cuperus, Sandy Jobin-Bevans		
The Vampire Dies in No Time	24	16	2021	Hiroshi Kōjina	Satetsu character.	
Monster High	46		2022–2023	Shea Fontana		
Frankenstream - Ce monstre qui nous dévore	4	4	2022	Pierre-Philippe Berson, Adrien Pavillard	TV mini series. Documentary.	
Wednesday	16	9	2022	Tim Burton	Lurch character.	
Creature	8	8	2023	Çağan Irmak	TV mini series.	
Undead Murder Farce	13	6	2023	Mamoru Hatakeyama		
Creature Commandos	7	7	2024	James Gunn		
Mighty MonsterWheelies	52	52	2024	Kyel White		

== List of individual TV episodes ==
TV series	Season, episode number and its name	Year(s)	Director(s)	Notes	Ref.
The Colgate Comedy Hour	S01E27 (11 March 1951)	1951	Charles Friedman, Kingman T. Moore		
Tales of Tomorrow	S01E16 Frankenstein	1952	Don Medford		
Fearless Fosdick	S01E06 Frank N. Stein	1952	Mary Chase		
The Colgate Comedy Hour	S04E21 (21 February 1954)	1954	Sid Smith, Ed Sobol		
Matinee Theatre	S02E99 Frankenstein	1957	Walter Grauman	Lost episode.	
The Adventures of Spunky and Tadpole	S01E12 The Mixed-Up Monster	1958	Art Moore		
Popeye the Sailor	S01E06 Mueller's Mad Monster	1960	Paul Fennell		
The Steve Allen Show	S05E14 Tony Bennett, Jayne Meadows, Caroline Richter, Monica Zetterlund	1960	Dwight Hemion	"Wife of Frankenstein" segment.	
The Adventures of Rocky and Bullwinkle and Friends	S01E26 The Deep Six and 7/8	1960		"How To Turn a Beastly Failure Into a Monstrous Success" segment.	
Studio Uno	S01E03 (4 November 1961)	1961	Antonello Falqui		
Route 66	S03E06 Lizard's Leg and Owlet's Wing	1962	Robert Gist		
Inspector Willoughby	S01E05 Hyde and Sneak	1962	Paul Smith		
Astro Boy	S01E02 Frankenstein	1963	Osamu Tezuka	Also known as Colosso.	
Mack & Myer for Hire	S01E61 Monstrous Merriment	1963	Ted Devlet		
Hollywood and the Stars	S01E15 Monsters We've Known and Loved	1964	Jack Haley Jr.	Documentary.	
The Famous Adventures of Mr. Magoo	S01E20 Mr. Magoo's Doctor Frankenstein	1965	Abe Levitow	Loosely based on the novel.	
Doctor Who	S02E33 Journey Into Terror	1965	Richard Martin		
Roger Ramjet	S01E03 Bat Guy	1965	Fred Crippen		
The Danny Kaye Show	S03E13 Vincent Price, Vikki Carr	1965	Bill Foster	"Bikini Beach Frankenstein" segment.	
Shindig!	S02E14	1965	Jorn H. Winther	Partially lost.	
The Red Skelton Hour	S14E31 Ta-Ra-Ra-Bum-Today	1965	Marcel Marceau	Herman Munster character.	
The Beatles	S01E24 I Feel Fine	1966	Barry Helmer, Mike Jones, Jack Stokes		
The Inspector	S01E09 Sicque! Sicque! Sicque!	1966	George Singer		
Batman	S02E27 The Penguin's Nest	1966	Murray Golden	Lurch character.	
Winsome Witch	S02E06 Hollywood or Busted	1966	Joseph Barbera, William Hanna		
The Danny Kaye Show	S03E30 Edie Adams, Fred Gwynne, Glenn Yarbrough	1966		Herman Munster character.	
The Monkees	S01E18 I Was a Teenage Monster	1967	Sidney Miller		
A Laurel and Hardy Cartoon	S01E76 Monster Bash	1967	Larry Harmon		
A Laurel and Hardy Cartoon	S01E147 Franken Stan	1967	Larry Harmon		
The Avengers	S05E10 Never, Never Say Die	1967	Robert Day		
Tom Slick	S01E02 Monster Rally	1967	Lew Keller		
The Abbott and Costello Cartoon Show	S01E14 Monster Muddled	1967			
The Monkees	S02E18 Monstrous Monkee Mash	1968	James Frawley		
Mystery and Imagination	S04E02 Frankenstein	1968	Voytek	Based on the novel.	
Get Smart	S03E20 The Wax Max	1968	James Komack		
The Inspector	S01E26 Transylvania Mania	1968	Gerry Chiniquy		
GeGeGe no Kitarō	S01E07 Ghost Train	1968	Shizuo Murayama		
GeGeGe no Kitarō	S01E13 The Cruise to Hell	1968	Takashi Hisaoka		
Monty Python's Flying Circus	S01E06 The BBC Entry for the Zinc Stoat of Budapest (or, It's the Arts)	1969	Ian MacNaughton	"The Dull Life of a City Stockbroker" segment.	
Scooby-Doo, Where Are You!	S01E11 A Gaggle of Galloping Ghosts	1969	Joseph Barbera, William Hanna		
GeGeGe no Kitarō	S01E54 Yōkai Rally	1969	Tomoharu Katsumata		
GeGeGe no Kitarō	S01E58 Oboro-Guruma	1969	Tomoharu Katsumata		
Rowan & Martin's Laugh-In	S03E12 Guest Starring Englebert Humperdinck	1969	Mark Warren		
The Benny Hill Show	S01E04 Show 4	1970	John Robins	"The Sound of Frankenstein" segment.	
The Morecambe & Wise Show	S03E05	1970	John Ammonds		
The Engelbert Humperdinck Show	S01E07	1970	Ian Fordyce		
Night Gallery	S02E04 Junior	1971	Theodore J. Flicker		
Rowan & Martin's Laugh-In	S04E20 Claudine Longet, Marcello Mastroianni, Louis Nye	1971	Mark Warren		
Rowan & Martin's Laugh-In	S04E26 Herschel Bernardi, Chuck Connors, Tim Conway, Phyllis Diller, Fernando Lamas, Louis Nye, George Raft	1971	Mark Warren		
The Carol Burnett Show	S06E11 Ray Charles and Vincent Price	1972	Dave Powers	"Bride of Frankenstein" segment.	
Supergulp, i fumetti in TV	Nick Carter e il mostro galante	1972	Sandro Lodolo, Guido De Maria		
The New Scooby-Doo Movies	S01E03 Wednesday is Missing	1972	William Hanna, Joseph Barbera	Lurch character.	
Henshin Ninja arashi	S01E24	1972			
Henshin Ninja arashi	S01E34	1972			
Henshin Ninja arashi	S01E35	1972			
The ABC Comedy Hour	S01E07 The Kopykats with guest Raymond Burr	1972	Dwight Hemion	"Gravediggers of 1942" segment.	
The ABC Saturday Superstar Movie	S01E03 Mad Mad Mad Monsters	1972	Jules Bass, Arthur Rankin Jr.		
The ABC Saturday Superstar Movie	S01E15 Daffy Duck and Porky Pig Meet the Groovie Goolies	1972	Hal Sutherland		
The ABC Saturday Superstar Movie	S02E02The Mini-Munsters	1973	Gerard Baldwin		
The Wide World of Mystery	S01E02-S01E03 Frankenstein (in two parts)	1973	Glenn Jordan	Based on the novel.	
Michael Bentine's Potty Time	S01E04 Movie Monsters	1973	Leon Thau		
The New Scooby-Doo Movies	S02E05 The Exterminator	1973	Joe Ruby, Ken Spears		
Goober and the Ghost Chasers	S01E04 The Singing Ghost	1973	Charles August Nichols		
Bailey's Comets	S01E07 Transylvania Mad Transit	1973	David H. DePatie, Friz Freleng, Joe Ruby, Ken Spears		
Sesame Street	S06E22 The Little Theatre of the Deaf visits (episode 687)	1974			
The Lost Saucer	S01E04 Transylvania 2300	1975	Dick Darley		
The Ghost Busters	S01E02 Dr. Whatsisname	1975	Larry Peerce		
The Goodies	S05E01 Movies	1975	Jim Franklin		
Akumaizer 3	S01E27 Why!? Zabitan Has Been Blown Away	1976	Atsuo Okunaka		
Saturday Night Live	S01E19 Madeline Kahn/Carly Simon	1976	Gary Weis, Dave Wilson	"I Feel Pretty" segment.	
The Hardy Boys/Nancy Drew Mysteries	S01E01 The Mystery of the Haunted House	1977	Glen A. Larson		
Manga Fairy Tales of the World	S01E46 Frankenstein	1977	Tatsuya Matano		
Due ragazzi incorreggibili	Episode dated 1 January 1977	1977	Romolo Siena		
Super Friends	S02E05 The Monster of Dr Droid	1977	Charles August Nichols		
The All New Popeye Hour	S01E12 Popeye Meets the Blutostein Monster	1978	Ray Patterson		
Super Friends	S03E16 The Rise and Fall of the Superfriends	1978	Ray Patterson, Carl Urbano		
Yogi's Space Race	S01E12 Race Through the Planet of the Monsters	1978	Ray Patterson, Carl Urbano		
The Tomorrow People	S07E02 Castle of Fear: Fighting Spirit	1978	Vic Hughes		
The Bay City Rollers Show	S01E04	1978			
The All New Popeye Hour	S01E03 The Terrifyink Transylvanian Treasure Trek	1978			
Invincible Steel Man Daitarn 3	S01E09 Okashina tsuisekisha	1978	Ryôji Fujiwara, Yoshiyuki Tomino		
Mork & Mindy	S02E05 Dr. Morkenstein	1979	Harvey Medlinsky		
Super Friends	S04E07 The Super Friends Meet Frankenstein	1979	Oscar Dufau, George Gordon, Ray Patterson		
Spider-Woman	S01E10 Dracula's Revenge	1979	Bob Richardson		
Scooby-Doo and Scrappy-Doo	S01E12 The Ghoul, the Bat, and the Ugly	1979	George Gordon, Ray Patterson, Oscar Dufau, Carl Urbano		
The New Fred and Barney Show	S02E02 Fred & Barney Meet the Frankenstones	1979	Oscar Dufau, George Gordon, Ray Patterson		
The Super Globetrotters	S01E07 The Super Globetrotters vs. Movie Man	1979	George Gordon, Ray Patterson, Carl Urbano		
The Plastic Man Comedy/Adventure Show	S01E05 Superstein	1979	Rudy Larriva, Charles August Nichols, Manuel Perez		
Lupin the 3rd Part II	S04E17 Frankenstein Attacks Lupin	1980	Kyôsuke Mikuriya		
Astro Boy	S01E06 Frankenstein	1980	Osamu Tezuka		
Danger Mouse	S01E03 Trouble with Ghosts	1981	Brian Cosgrove		
Fantasy Island	S05E04 The Lady and the Monster	1981	Don Chaffey		
Here's Boomer	S02E06 Camityville's Boomer	1981	Larry Stewart		
Fridays	S02E19 Andy Kaufman/Sir Douglas Quintet	1981	John Moffitt	"The Return of Frankenstein" segment.	
Urusei Yatsura	S04E02 The Big Year-End Party That Lum Organized!	1982	Keiji Hayakawa, Mamoru Oshii		
Tokimeki Tonight	S01E07 Kyôfu no bunkamatsuri	1982	Akinori Nagaoka, Hiroshi Sasagawa, Kazunori Tanabashi		
Spider-Man and His Amazing Friends	S03E02 The Bride of Dracula!	1983	Don Jurwich	Also known as The Transylvanian Connection.	
The New Scooby and Scrappy-Doo Show	S01E11 Who's Minding the Monster?	1983	Oscar Dufau, George Gordon, Carl Urbano		
Danger Mouse	S04E07 Tower of Terror	1983	Brian Cosgrove		
Silver Spoons	S03E05 A Dark and Stormy Night	1984	Jack Shea		
Muppet Babies	S01E03 Dental Hyjinks	1984	John Gibbs, Bob Richardson		
The New Scooby-Doo Mysteries	S01E02 Scooby's Peep-Hole Pandemonium	1984	Oscar Dufau, Rudy Zamora, Ray Patterson		
The New Scooby-Doo Mysteries	S01E08 A Halloween Hassle at Dracula's Castle	1984	Oscar Dufau, Rudy Zamora, Ray Patterson		
Hulk Hogan's Rock 'n' Wrestling	S01E01 Junkenstein	1985	Bruno Bianchi		
The Transformers	S02E01 Autobot Spike	1985	Andy Kim, Bob Kirk, Al Kouzel		
The 13 Ghosts of Scooby-Doo	S01E05 That's Monstertainment	1985	Arthur Davis, Oscar Dufau, Tony Love		
The 13 Ghosts of Scooby-Doo	S01E13 Horror-Scope Scoob	1985	Arthur Davis, Oscar Dufau, Tony Love		
Inspector Gadget	S02E09 Gadget Meets the Grappler	1985	Bruno Bianchi		
You Can't Do That on Television	S05E19 Science	1985	Brenda Mason		
The Transformers	S03E19 Nightmare Planet	1986	Andy Kim, Ray Lee		
Tales from the Darkside	S03E01 The Circus	1986	Michael Gornick		
Everyman	S12E06 The True Story of Frankenstein	1986	Alan Lewens	Documentary with live-action scenes based on some fragments of the novel.	
Scotch and Wry	Episode dated 31 December 1986	1986	Gordon Menzies		
GeGeGe no Kitarō	S01E51 World Yōkai Rally	1986	Takeshi Shirato		
Moonlighting	S02E11 The Bride of Tupperman	1986	Will Mackenzie, Christian I. Nyby II		
Ghostbusters	S01E08 Wacky Wax Museum	1986	Marsh Lamore		
Hello Kitty's Furry Tale Theater	S01E08 Frankencat	1987	Tony Oliver		
The Real Ghostbusters	S02E12 Janine Melnitz, Ghostbuster	1987			
DuckTales	S01E32 Ducky Horror Picture Show	1987	Terence Harrison		
Muppet Babies	S04E06 This Little Piggy Went to Hollywood	1987	Ray Lee, Bob Richardson		
Not Necessarily the News	S05E04 Inside Entertainment	1987	Paul Miller		
Saturday Night Live	S13E08 Paul Simon/Linda Ronstadt	1987	Paul Miller	"Succinctly Speaking" and "Season's Greetings" segments.	
Mighty Mouse: The New Adventures	S02E05 Mouse and Supermouse	1988	Ralph Bakshi, Kent Butterworth		
Count Duckula	S01E03 One Stormy Night	1988	Chris Randall		
Saturday Night Live	S14E09 Melanie Griffith/Little Feat	1988	Paul Miller, Tom Schiller	"Season's Greetings" segment.	
Superman	S01E09 Bonechill	1988	Charles August Nichols		
The Super Mario Bros. Super Show!	S01E06 The Mario Monster Mash	1989	Dan Riba		
The Super Mario Bros. Super Show!	S01E26 Koopenstein	1989	Dan Riba		
The New Adventures of Winnie the Pooh	S02E06 The Monster Frankenpooh	1989	Terence Harrison, Ken Kessel		
Saturday Night Live	S14E11 Tony Danza/John Hiatt	1989	Paul Miller	"As World Turn" and "Sing Along" segments.	
Saturday Night Live	S14E16 Mel Gibson/Living Colour	1989	Paul Miller	"As World Turn" and "Belated Easter Greetings" segments.	
Saturday Night Live	S14E20 Steve Martin/Tom Petty & The Heartbreakers	1989	Paul Miller	"Have A Bitchin’ Summer" segment.	
Saturday Night Live	S15E04 James Woods/Don Henley	1989	Tom Schiller, James Signorelli, Dave Wilson	"Halloween Greetings" segment.	
Saturday Night Live	S15E06 Woody Harrelson/David Byrne	1989	Dave Wilson	"Thanksgiving Good, Fire Bad" and "Thanksgiving Greetings" segments.	
Saturday Night Live	S15E09 Andie MacDowell/Tracy Chapman	1989	Dave Wilson, Tom Schiller	"Season's Greetings" segment.	
A Pup Named Scooby-Doo	S02E04 Chickenstein Lives!	1989	Don Lusk, Ray Patterson, Paul Sommer		
Fantastic Max	S02E07 Movie Star Max	1989	Don Lusk		
Captain N: The Game Master	S01E03 The Most Dangerous Game Master	1989	Michael Maliani		
Captain N: The Game Master	S01E08 Mr. and Mrs. Mother Brain	1989	Michael Maliani		
Dragon Ball Z	S01E07 Day 1	1989	Daisuke Nishio		
Tiny Toon Adventures	S01E43 Best o' Plucky Duck Day	1990	Rich Arons	"Duck in the Dark" segment.	
Attack of the Killer Tomatoes	S01E11 Frankenstem Tomato	1990	Karen Peterson		
Teenage Mutant Ninja Turtles	S01E32 Rondo in New York	1990	Mike Stuart		
Count Duckula	S02E17 Return of the Curse of the Secret of the Mummy's Tomb Meets Franken Duckula's Monster...	1990	Chris Randall	Also known as A Very Long Title.	
Saturday Night Live	S15E12 Quincy Jones & Co.	1990	James Signorelli, Dave Wilson	"Swimsuit Issue" and "We Are World" segments.	
Monsters	S03E09 The Young and the Headless	1990	Tom Abrams	Hunk character.	
Monsters	S03E17 Leavings	1991	John Tillinger		
Garfield and Friends	S04E05 Frankenstein Feline	1991	Vincent Davis, Bernard Wolf		
Tom & Jerry Kids	S02E09 McWolfenstein	1991	Don Lusk, Paul Sommer, Carl Urbano		
Saturday Night Live	S16E11 Sting	1991	James Signorelli, Dave Wilson	"Dr. Frankenstein" segment.	
Saturday Night Live	S17E09 Steve Martin/James Taylor	1991	Dave Wilson, Peter Corbett	"Season's Greetings" segment.	
The Simpsons	S03E07 Treehouse of Horror II	1991	Jim Reardon		
TaleSpin	S01E63 The Incredible Shrinking Molly	1991	James T. Walker		
In Living Color	S03E24 Anton Gets Rich	1992	Terri McCoy, Rosie Perez	"The Al Sharpton and Louis Farrakhan Comedy Hour: Haunted House" segment.	
The Ben Stiller Show	S01E09 With Garry Shandling	1992	John Fortenberry, Troy Miller, Ben Stiller	"Woody Allen's Bride of Frankenstein" segment.	
Goof Troop	S01E44 Frankengoof	1992	Robert Taylor		
T-Bag and the Sunstones of Montezuma	S01E09 Y-Fronts	1992	Glyn Edwards		
Kyoryu Sentai Zyuranger	S01E28 Clay Monsters, New And Improved	1992	Shouhei Toujou		
Kyoryu Sentai Zyuranger	S01E29 A Mystery!? The Attacking Beast Knight God	1992	Shouhei Toujou		
Kyoryu Sentai Zyuranger	S01E30 Satan Comes!!	1992	Takeshi Ogasawara		
Kyoryu Sentai Zyuranger	S01E31 Reborn! The Ultimate God	1992	Takeshi Ogasawara		
Sailor Moon	S01E20 The Summer! The Ocean! Our Youth! And a Ghost Too	1992	Junichi Sato, Kazuhisa Takenouchi		
Paul Merton: The Series	S02E03'	1993	Liddy Oldroyd		
VeggieTales	Where's God When I'm S-Scared?	1993	Phil Vischer, Chris Olsen	Also known as Tales from the Crisper.	
Animaniacs	S01E29 Phranken-Runt	1993	Michael Gerard, Byron Vaughns		
Mighty Morphin Power Rangers	S01E25 Life's a Masquerade	1993	Robert Hughes		
The Pink Panther	S01E15 Pinkenstein	1993	Charles Grosvenor, Byron Vaughns		
Tom & Jerry Kids	S04E10 Bride of McWolfenstein	1993	Don Lusk, Paul Sommer, Carl Urbano		
Saturday Night Live	S18E18 Kirstie Alley/Lenny Kravitz	1993	Dave Wilson, Peter Corbett, Tom Schiller	"Recurring Characters for Unity" segment.	
Tales from the Cryptkeeper	S02E04 All the Gory Details!	1994	Laura Shepherd		
Fantastic Four: The Animated Series	S01E05 The Silver Surfer and the Coming of Galactus: Part 1	1994			
Akazukin Chacha	S01E15 Baby Franken-chan	1994			
Wishbone	S01E17 Frankenbone	1995	Allen Mondell	Based on some fragments of the novel.	
Dragon Ball Z	S01E285 People of Earth Unite	1995	Shigeyasu Yamauchi	Android 8 character.	
Tales from the Crypt	S07E13 The Third Pig	1996	Bill Kopp, Patrick A. Ventura		
Quack Pack	S01E09 Tasty Paste	1996	Kurt Anderson		
100 Years of Horror	S01E03 Frankenstein's Friends	1996		Documentary.	
100 Years of Horror	S01E04 Baron Frankenstein	1996		Documentary.	
Freakazoid!	S01E12 House of Freakazoid	1996	Jack Heiter, Eric Radomski, Dan Riba		
Nightmare: The Birth of Victorian Horror	S01E01 Frankenstein	1996	Derek Towers	Documentary.	
The Spooktacular New Adventures of Casper	S01E01 Spooking Bee	1996	Alfred Gimeno		
The Spooktacular New Adventures of Casper	S02E08 Spooky and Poil Meet the Monsters	1996	Alfred Gimeno		
Bone Chillers	S01E04 Frankenturkey	1996	Adam Rifkin		
Saturday Night Live	S21E16 Phil Hartman/Gin Blossoms	1996	Beth McCarthy-Miller	"Weekend Update" segment.	
Dragon Ball GT	S01E40 Piccolo's Decision	1997	Osamu Kasai	Android 8 character. Also known as Earth Explodes!! Piccolo's Grave Decision.	
Buffy the Vampire Slayer	S02E02 Some Assembly Required	1997	Bruce Seth Green		
Monica and Friends	S09E03 Frank em Ser Criança	1997	Mauricio de Sousa		
The X-Files	S05E05 The Post-Modern Prometheus	1997	Chris Carter		
You Wish	S01E06 Halloween	1997	Jeff McCracken		
The Triplets	S04E10 Dr. Frankenstein	1997	Baltasar Pedrosa, Robert Balser		
GeGeGe no Kitarō	S01E64Violent Dispute! Yōkai Rally	1997	Kōnosuke Uda		
Dragon Ball GT	S01E64 Until We Meet Again	1997	Osamu Kasai	Android 8 character.	
Sabrina the Teenage Witch	S03E06 Good Will Haunting	1998	Kenneth R. Koch		
Dexter's Laboratory	S02E26 Rushmore Rumble	1998	John McIntyre, Rumen Petkov, Genndy Tartakovsky		
Flying Rhino Junior High	S01E05 Frankensidebottom	1998	Julian Harris		
CatDog	S01E14 Nightmare	1998	Yumun Jeong		
Celebrity Deathmatch	S02E19 Haunted Halloween of Horror	1999	Eric Fogel		
I Am Weasel	S05E22 I Am Franken-Weasel	1999	David Feiss		
Mega Babies	S01E15 Dr. Franken-Buck	1999	Christian Tremblay, Yvon Tremblay		
Big Wolf on Campus	S02E02 Frank Stein	2000	Mark Jean		
Sabrina the Teenage Witch	S05E06 The Halloween Scene	2000	Melissa Joan Hart		
Johnny Bravo	S03E12 Frankenbravo	2001	Kirk Tingblad		
Futurama	S03E04 Parasites Lost	2001	Peter Avanzino, Rich Moore		
Vampiyan Kids	S01E08	2001	Masatsugu Arakawa		
Shin Megami Tensei: DeviChil	S01E14 Franken! Just what is the DeviGenome!?	2001	Norio Taniguchi		
Mona the Vampire	S03E03 The Transformation of Frank Stein	2002	Louis Piché, Jean Caillon		
Big Train	S02E06	2002	Jonathan Gershfield		
Courage the Cowardly Dog	S04E06 Profiles in Courage	2002	John R. Dilworth		
Time Squad	S02E08 White House Weirdness	2002	Dave Wasson		
The Simpsons	S14E04 Large Marge	2002	Jim Reardon		
Beyblade	S01E32 Darkness at the End of the Tunnel...	2002	Toshifumi Kawase, Gyeong Gwan Kim	Zomb character.	
Beyblade	S01E33 Last Tangle in Paris	2002	Toshifumi Kawase, Gyeong Gwan Kim	Zomb character.	
Beyblade	S01E38 Olympia Challenge	2002	Toshifumi Kawase, Gyeong Gwan Kim	Zomb character.	
Beyblade	S01E39 A Majestic Battle... A Majestic Victory?	2002	Toshifumi Kawase, Gyeong Gwan Kim	Zomb character.	
Telepasión española	S01E13 Telepasión 13	2002	Javier Caballero, Belén Molinero		
The Simpsons	S14E12 I'm Spelling as Fast as I Can	2003	Nancy Kruse, Jim Reardon		
The Simpsons	S14E14 Mr. Spritz Goes to Washington	2003	Jim Reardon, Lance Kramer		
The Simpsons	S15E01 Treehouse of Horror XIV	2003	Steven Dean Moore		
Astro Boy	S01E09 Franken	2003	Kazuya Konaka, Keiichirô Mochizuki		
Late Night with Conan O’Brien	S11E8 Kevin James/Teri Polo/Ken Burns	2003	Allan Kartun		
Late Night with Conan O’Brien	S11E39 Zach Braff/Billy Connolly/The Brian Setzer Orchestra	2003	Allan Kartun		
Late Night with Conan O’Brien	S11E51 Tom Brokaw/Gary Sheffield/John Mayer with Buddy Guy and Double Trouble	2003	Allan Kartun		
Un, dos, tres... responda otra vez	S10E12 Frankenstein	2004	Chicho Ibáñez Serrador		
Late Night with Conan O’Brien	S11E72 James Spader/Ruben Studdard/Kenny Chesney	2004	Allan Kartun	"Frankenstein Wastes a Minute of Our Time" segment.	
Late Night with Conan O’Brien	S11E92 Al Franken/Vivica A. Fox/Scotty Nguyen	2004	Allan Kartun	"Frankenstein Wastes a Minute of Our Time" segment.	
Late Night with Conan O'Brien	S11E100 Chris Rock/Shannon Elizabeth/Joe Buck	2004	Allan Kartun	"Frankenstein Wastes a Minute of Our Time" segment.	
Late Night with Conan O’Brien	S11E116 Tom Selleck/Macaulay Culkin/Dave Attell	2004	Allan Kartun		
Late Night with Conan O’Brien	S11E141 Al Sharpton/Randy Constan/Jimmy Smits	2004	Allan Kartun	"Frankenstein Wastes a Minute of Our Time" segment.	
Case Closed	S13E13 Head-to-Head Match with the Black Organization: A Dual Mystery on a Full Moon Night	2004	Masato Satô		
Saturday Night Live	S30E04 Kate Winslet/Eminem	2004	Robert Marianetti, Beth McCarthy-Miller, David Wachtenheim	"Mrs. Dr. Frankenstein" segment.	
The Fairly OddParents	S04E09 Shelf Life	2004	Butch Hartman		
Mad TV	S09E14	2004	Bruce Leddy	"The Bride Of Funkenstein" segment.	
Mad TV	S09E21	2004	Bruce Leddy	"Funkenstein Against Dr. Jekyll And Mr. Hyde" segment.	
Mad TV	S09E25	2004	Bruce Leddy	"Funkenstein Against The Werewolf Hookers" segment.	
Mad TV	S10E21	2005	Bruce Leddy	"Funkenstein vs. Queen Nefertiti" segment.	
Robot Chicken	S01E14 Joint Point	2005	Doug Goldstein	"Monster Bullying" segment.	
Robot Chicken	S01E16 Nightmare Generator	2005	Matthew Senreich	"Frankenstein Rejection" segment.	
Duck Dodgers	S02E10 Castle High	2005	Spike Brandt and Tony Cervone		
The Grim Adventures of Billy & Mandy	S3E13 Home of the Ancients	2005	Robert Alvarez		
The Simpsons	S17E04 Treehouse of Horror XVI	2005	David Silverman		
My Parents Are Aliens	S07E04 Halloween Tales	2005	Ben Kellett		
Hi Hi Puffy AmiYumi	S03E13 It's Alive!	2006	Darin McGowan, Akiko Nishimura, Scott O'Brien		
Chappelle's Show	S03E03 Show Business & Lil Jon In Love	2006	Rusty Cundieff		
Robot Chicken	S02E18 Lust for Puppets	2006	Seth Green	"Frankenstein's Fiancee" segment.	
Saturday Night Live	S32E04 Hugh Laurie/Beck	2006	Don Roy King	"Late Night Movie" segment.	
Time Warp Trio	S01E21 Nightmare on Joe's Street	2006	David SanAngelo		
History's Mysteries	S15E11 Frankenstein	2006		Documentary.	
The Venture Bros.	S02E11 ¡Viva los muertos!	2006	Christopher McCulloch		
Growing Up Creepie	S01E02 Frogenstein	2006	Andy Luckey		
Codename: Kids Next Door	S05E10 Operation S.P.A.N.K.E.N.S.T.I.N.E.	2006	Mr. Warburton		
Late Night with Conan O’Brien	S13E77 Meredith Vieira/Jeff Probst/Jim Gaffigan	2006	Allan Kartun		
Late Night with Conan O’Brien	S13E81 Tom Cavanagh/Josh Holloway/Sigur Ros	2006	Allan Kartun		
Late Night with Conan O’Brien	S13E102 Nathan Lane/Padma Lakshmi/Kris Kristofferson	2006	Allan Kartun		
Tripping the Rift	S03E01 Skankenstein	2007	Bernie Denk		
Cinemassacre's Monster Madness	S01E05 Frankenstein (1931)	2007	James Rolfe	Film reviewed.	
South Park	S11E11 Imaginationland Episode II	2007	Trey Parker		
South Park	S11E12 Imaginationland Episode III	2007	Trey Parker		
Shaggy & Scooby-Doo Get a Clue!	S02E08 Super Scary Movie Night	2007	Charles Visser		
Tom and Jerry Tales	S02E05 Monster Con	2007	T.J. House		
Jibber Jabber	S01E02 Pride of Frankenstein	2007	David Bowes		
Ben 10	S03E12 The Return	2007	Scooter Tidwell		
Ben 10	S03E13 Be Afraid of the Dark	2007	Sebastian Montes		
Scrubs	S06E09 My Perspective	2007	John Putch		
GeGeGe no Kitarō	S01E31 Yōkai Top Spinning Match!	2007	Yutaka Tsuchida		
GeGeGe no Kitarō	S01E32 Landing! The Threat of Western Yōkai	2007	Hiroyuki Kakudō		
GeGeGe no Kitarō	S01E33 Great Counterattack! Japanese Yōkai	2007	Yukihiko Nakao		
Murder Princess	S01E02 Coronation	2007	Tomoyuki Kurokawa		
Murder Princess	S01E03 Return	2007	Tomoyuki Kurokawa		
Lilly the Witch	S02E23 Lilly and Frankensteins Monster	2007	Sam Siahaija		
The Girls Next Door	S05E04 Scream Test	2008	Kevin Burns		
Oggy and the Cockroaches	S03E22 Oggy wood	2008	Olivier Jean-Marie		
Phineas and Ferb	S01E22 The Monster of Phineas-n-Ferbenstein	2008	Zac Moncrief		
Robot Chicken	S03E19 President Evil	2008	Chris McKay	"Ocean's Thirty-Eight" segment.	
GeGeGe no Kitarō	S01E46 Banquet of the Snake Woman, Gorgon	2008	Yūshun Tatsusen		
GeGeGe no Kitarō	S01E68 Huge Battle of Hell! All of the Western Yōkai Appear	2008	Hidehiko Kadota		
Wizards of Waverly Place	S03E01 Franken-Girl	2009	Bob Koherr		
Wizards of Waverly Place	S03E04 Three Monsters	2009	Victor Gonzalez		
True Horror	S01E03 Frankenstein	2009	Julien Benoiton		
Saturday Night Live	S35E05 Taylor Swift	2009	Don Roy King, Akiva Schaffer	"Firelight" segment.	
The Simpsons	S21E04 Treehouse of Horror XX	2009	Mike B. Anderson		
Marvel Superheroes: What the--?!	S01E7 It's a Thriller-er	2009			
Kamen Rider Decade	S01E06 Battle Trial: Ryuki World	2009		Riki character.	
Mad	S01E07 Big Time Rushmore	2010	Aaron Horvath	"Frankenstein" segment.	
The Simpsons	S21E09 Thursdays with Abie	2010	Mike B. Anderson, Mike Frank Polcino		
Big Time Rush	S02E05 Big Time Halloween	2010	Paul Lazarus		
The Muppets Kitchen with Cat Cora	S01E01 Movie Night	2010			
Mater's Tall Tales	S01E06 Monster Truck Mater	2010	John Lasseter		
Hakaba Kitarō	S01E10 Brigadoon	2010	Kōhei Hatano		
The Simpsons	S22E04 Treehouse of Horror XXI	2010	Bob Anderson		
Big Babies	S01E07 Rainy Day	2010	Jon Riche		
A History of Horror with Mark Gatiss	S01E01 Frankenstein Goes to Hollywood	2010	John Das		
Baron Porkchop's Terrifying Tales of the Macabre!	S01E03 Frankenstein '80	2010	Matt Brassfield		
Conan	S01E63 Everybody Wang But Don't Chung Tonight	2011	Andrés du Bouchet		
Conan	S01E67 And in This Corner... Gingivitis!	2011			
Saturday Night Live	S36E13 Jesse Eisenberg/Nicki Minaj	2011	Don Roy King, Akiva Schaffer	"Bride of Blackenstein" segment.	
Robot Chicken	S05E13 The Departy Monster	2011	Chris McKay	"Franken Berry Distraught" segment.	
Saturday Night Live	S36E19 Helen Mirren/Foo Fighters	2011	Don Roy King, Rhys Thomas	"Mary Shelley" segment.	
Mad	S01E15 So You Think You Can Train Your Dragon How to Dance	2011	John Harvatine IV	"MAD Rebus Sentences" segment.	
The Super Hero Squad Show	S02E17 This Man-Thing, This Monster!	2011	Patty Shinagawa		
Ben 10: Ultimate Alien	S03E05 Viktor: The Spoils	2011	Butch Lukic		
Cinemassacre's Monster Madness	S05E07 House of Dracula	2011	James Rolfe	Film reviewed.	
Prophets of Science Fiction	S01E01 Mary Shelley	2011	Declan Whitebloom	Documentary.	
American Dad!	S07E17 Ricky Spanish	2012	Shawn Murray, Ron Hughart, Brent Woods		
Adventure Time	S04E09 Princess Monster Wife	2012	Bong Hee Han, Larry Leichliter		
Max's Midnight Movies	S01E05 Frankenbabes	2012	Kulcsar Arthur		
Max's Midnight Movies Polish Edition	S01E05 Frankenbabes	2012	Péter Vajda		
South Park	S16E12 A Nightmare on FaceTime	2012	Trey Parker		
Mad	S03E15 Frankenwinnie	2012	Jeff Gardner, Ethan Marak		
China, IL	S01E08 Frankensteve	2012	Mike L. Mayfield		
Grizzly Tales For Gruesome Kids	S08E07 Frank Einstein's Monster	2012	Jamie Rix		
Once Upon a Time	S02E05 The Doctor	2012	Paul A. Edwards		
Secret Mountain Fort Awesome	S02E06 Secret Mountain Uncle Grandpa	2012	Peter Browngardt		
Once Upon a Time	S02E12 In the Name of the Brother	2013	Milan Cheylov		
Face Off	S05E02 Future Frankenstein	2013			
Ultimate Spider-Man	S02E21 Blade	2013	Roy Burdine		
Ultimate Spider-Man	S02E22 The Howling Commandos	2013	Philip Pignotti, Alex Soto		
Mad	S04E13 After Bert	2013		"What Not to Werewolf" segment.	
Mad	S04E21 Monster Mashville	2013	Pete Levin, Ethan Marak		
Ben 10: Omniverse	S03E01 T.G.I.S.	2013	Christopher Berkeley		
Ben 10: Omniverse	S04E04 Max's Monster	2013	John Fang		
Ben 10: Omniverse	S05E01 Something Zombozo This Way Comes	2013	Dan Riba		
The Venture Bros.	S05E02 Venture Libre	2013	Christopher McCulloch		
Above Average Presents	Sexy Monster Mash	2013	Matthew Catanzano		
Spooksville	S01E19 Oh Monster, My Monster	2014	Neill Fearnley		
Hulk and the Agents of S.M.A.S.H.	S02E03 The Hulking Commandos	2014	Patrick Archibald		
Winx Club	S06E21 A Monster Crush	2014	Iginio Straffi		
Travis Richey Sketch Show	S01E12 Frankensexual, Gay Date with Frankenstein	2014	Travis Richey		
Ben 10: Omniverse	S05E06 Rad Monster Party	2014	John Fang, Jae Woo Kim		
Ben 10: Omniverse	S05E07 Charmed, I'm Sure	2014	Dan Riba		
Ben 10: Omniverse	S05E08 The Vampire Strikes Back	2014	Jae Hong Kim		
Ben 10: Omniverse	S06E01 And Then There Were None	2014	Jae Woo Kim		
Ben 10: Omniverse	S06E02 And Then There Was Ben	2014	Dan Riba		
Ben 10: Omniverse	S06E04 Cough It Up	2014	Jae Woo Kim		
Ben 10: Omniverse	S07E07 The Color of Monkey	2014	Jae Woo Kim		
The Librarians	S02E02 And the Broken Staff	2014	Marc Roskin		
Superjail!	S04E05 Superstorm!	2014	Christy Karacas		
The 7D	S01E14 Frankengloom	2014	Jeff Gordon, Tom Warburton		
Teen Titans Go!	S02E19 Halloween	2014	Peter Rida Michail		
The Show Show	S01E08 Boo!	2014	Nicholas Zebrun		
Hulk and the Agents of S.M.A.S.H.	S02E21 Days of Future Smash, Part 3: Dracula	2015			
Rick and Morty	S02E04 Total Rickall	2015	Juan Jose Meza-Leon, Pete Michels		
Shimmer and Shine	S01E08 A Very Genie Halloweenie	2015	Jay Baker		
Littlest Pet Shop	S04E05 Littlest Pet Shop of Horrors	2015	Steven Garcia, Joel Dickie		
Shuriken Sentai Ninninger	S01E23 Shinobi 23: It's Summer! Ninja Courage Test	2015	Shôjirô Nakazawa		
Shuriken Sentai Ninninger	S01E24 Shinobi 24: It's Summer! The Chilling Arrival of Western Yokai!	2015	Noboru Takemoto		
Destiny the Quest	S01E02 Dead and the Damned	2015	James Panetta, Froy San Pedro		
Man Seeking Woman	S01E09 Teacup	2015	Tim Kirkby		
Monster Shrink	S01E02 Frankenstein Crybaby	2015	Roger Christiansen		
Monster Shrink	S01E09 Igor, Not Just a Sidekick Anymore	2015	Roger Christiansen		
Dragon Ball Kai	S01E65 The World's Savior Is You! Everyone's Genki-Dama Is Completed!!	2015	Togo Shoji	Android 8 character.	
The Thundermans	S04E01 Happy Heroween	2016	Eric Dean Seaton		
Cinemassacre's Monster Madness	S10E14 Mary Shelley's Frankenstein	2016	James Rolfe	Film reviewed.	
Family Guy	S15E01 The Boys in the Band	2016	Joseph Lee		
Family Guy	S15E08 Carter and Tricia	2016	Mike Kim		
The Powerpuff Girls	S02E33 Derby Dollies	2016	Kelly Armstrong		
Wander Over Yonder	S02E19 The Heebie Jeebies	2016	Dave Thomas		
Teen Titans Go!	S04E02 Halloween v Christmas	2016	Luke Cormican		
Siesta Z	S01E19 Frankenstein	2017	María Antolini		
The Sereno Show	S01E14 Junkenstein's Revenge	2017	Matthew Sereno		
Mickey Mouse	S04E09 The Scariest Story Ever: A Mickey Mouse Halloween Spooktacular!	2017	Alonso Ramirez Ramos, Eddie Trigueros, Dave Wasson		
Teenage Mutant Ninja Turtles	S05E16 The Frankenstein Experiment	2017	Alan Wan, Heather A. Maxwell, Ciro Nieli		
Teenage Mutant Ninja Turtles	S05E17 Monsters Among Us!	2017	Heather A. Maxwell, Ciro Nieli		
OK K.O.! Let's Be Heroes	S01E36 Parents Day	2017	Sunjae Lee, Byungjae Oh, Suhong Kim		
The Professor's Scary Movie Show	S02E01 Halloween Special 2017	2017	Paul Gerard Kennedy		
Atomic Age Cinema!	S01E01 The Phantom Dentist	2017			
Warau Salesman NEW	S01E06 I'll Lease This Monster	2017	Yoshihiko Iwata		
The Snack World	S01E22 All Bark; No Bite!	2017	Takeshi Mori	Also known as Firing the Sprightly Silver Bullet.	
Le documentaire culturel	Le funeste destin du docteur Frankenstein	2018	Jean Froment	Documentary.	
Muppet Babies	S01E15 Happy Hallowocka!/The Teeth-Chattering Tale of the Haunted Pancakes	2018	Guy Moore	Short appearance of the monster in the first part, Piggy dressed as the Bride in the second part.	
The Powerpuff Girls	S03E11 Total Eclipse of the Kart	2018	Kelly Armstrong		
Hot Streets	S01E10 The Final Stand	2018	Pete Michels		
OK K.O.! Let's Be Heroes	S02E23 Monster Party	2018	Ian Jones-Quartey		
Teen Titans Go!	S05E08 Monster Squad!	2018	Luke Cormican, Dave Stone		
The Professor's Scary Movie Show	S02E26 Halloween Special (On The Vortexx)	2018	Paul Gerard Kennedy		
Video Cop	Bring Me the Blood of the Werewolf	2018	Ville Lähde		
Midsomer Murders	S19E06 The Curse of the Ninth	2018	Matt Carter		
Dragon Ball Super	S01E65 Final Judgement? The Ultimate Power of an Absolute God	2018	Kōhei Hatano	Android 8 character.	
Dragon Ball Super	S01E66 Showdown! The Miraculous Power of Unyielding Warriors	2018	Kōhei Hatano	Android 8 character.	
Dragon Ball Super	S01E67 With New Hope in His Heart - Farewell, Trunks	2018	Kōhei Hatano	Android 8 character.	
Tom the Tow Truck	S04E02 Halloween - Frankenstein's Monster needs a repair!	2018	Holly Knowles		
Rise of the Teenage Mutant Ninja Turtles	S01E29 Sparring Partner	2019	Abe Audish		
Monta in the Odd Galaxy	S01E30 Maika's Hair-Raising Adventure	2019	Phi Phi Anh Nguyen		
Monta in the Odd Galaxy	S01E31 Little Flower Shop of Horrors	2019	Phi Phi Anh Nguyen		
Monta in the Odd Galaxy	S01E32 Dr. Frankenflower's Monsters	2019	Phi Phi Anh Nguyen		
The Simpsons	S30E15 101 Mitigations	2019	Mark Kirkland		
Studio C	S10E05	2019	Adam Thomas Anderegg	"Frankenstein Gets His Bill" segment.	
Robot Chicken	S10E01 Ginger Hill in: Bursting Pipes	2019	Tom Sheppard	"Opening Sketch - Frankenstein" segment.	
The Tom and Jerry Show	S03E38 A Head For Science	2019			
OK K.O.! Let's Be Heroes	S03E18-S03E19 Let's Fight to the End (in two parts)	2019	Seo Jeongseok, Chang-woo Shin		
Mike Tyson Mysteries	S04E18 The Stein Way	2020	Jeff Siergey		
Scooby-Doo and Guess Who?	S02E06 The Feast of Dr. Frankenfooder!	2020	Frank Paur		
Ghostwriter	S01E11-S01E13 Franken-Ghost (in three parts)	2020	Luke Matheny		
DuckTales	S03E10 The Trickening!	2020	Matthew Humphreys		
DuckTales	S03E11 The Forbidden Fountain of the Foreverglades!	2020	Tanner Johnson		
Animaniacs	S01E11 Bride of Pinky	2020	Katie Rice		
Robot Chicken	S10E16 Ghandi Mulholland in: Plastic Doesn't Get Cancer	2020	Tom Sheppard	"Fire Bad" segment.	
Pancake Manor	S10E05 Halloween Graveyard Dance-Off	2020	Reb Stevenson		
Pancake Manor	S10E06 Halloween Special for Kids	2020	Reb Stevenson		
Doctor Who	S12E08 The Haunting of Villa Diodati	2020	Emma Sullivan	Ashad character.	
The Professor's Scary Movie Show	S04E01 Halloween 2020	2020	Paul Gerard Kennedy		
Creepshow	S02E01 Model Kid	2021	Greg Nicotero		
Great British Theatre	S01E04 Frankenstein (Benedict Cumberbatch as the Creature)	2021		Based on the novel.	
Great British Theatre	S01E05 Frankenstein (Jonny Lee Miller as the Creature)	2021		Based on the novel.	
Eli Roth's History of Horror	S03E06 Mad Scientist	2021	Kurt Sayenga	Documentary.	
Adventures of Petya and the Wolf	S01E17 The Case of Frankenstein's Monster	2021	Aleksey Lebedev		
Digimon Adventure:	S01E54 The Wandering Berserker Rebellimon	2021		Boltmon character.	
Hey Duggee	S03E51 The Building Block Badge	2021	Evgenia Golubeva		
Studio C	S16E05 Ha Ha Halloween	2022	Kenlon Clark, Jake Van Wagoner	"Frankenstein's Bride Wants To Wait" segment.	
Temple Smash	S14E01	2022	Charlie Anzalone, Corinna Boeck		
I Think You Should Leave with Tim Robinson	S03E06 When I First Thought of This You Didn't Even Have Hands Up There: You Were Just Walking Straight Up The Wall.	2023	Fatal Farm, Andrew Fitzgerald, Alice Mathias	Tasty Time Vids segment.	
Salvage Hunters: The Restorers	S06E00 Halloween Special	2023	Dominic Callaghan, Sean Graham, Charlie Preston		
Rick and Morty	S07E08 Mort: Ragnarick	2023	Wesley Archer		
My Unique Skill Makes Me OP Even at Level 1	S01E06 A Beautiful Girl Appears	2023	Nazuna Miki		
My Unique Skill Makes Me OP Even at Level 1	S01E07 This Dungeon Battle Is a Vortex of Schemes	2023	Nazuna Miki		
The Read	S02E02 Frankenstein	2024	Rachel Lambert	Novel reading with live-action scenes based on some fragments of the novel.	
QTC's Murder Mystery	S01E03 Real Life Murder Mystery	2024			
Jellystone!	S03E27 Jelly Robo Battle Royale	2025	C. H. Greenblatt		
The Late Show with Stephen Colbert	S11E30 Anthony Hopkins	2025		"The Colbert Questionert" segment.	
Hammered with Lord Belmont Shores	S02E06 The Curse of Frankenstein	2025	M.F. Dinan	Film reviewed.	
South Park	S28E03 Sora Not Sorry	2025	Trey Parker		
Rick and Morty	S09E10 Field of Dreams	2026	Jacob Hair, Eugene Huang		

== See also ==
- Frankenstein
- Mary Shelley
- Frankenstein in popular culture
