= Ghost Soldier =

Ghost soldier may refer to:

- Ghost soldiers, people whose names appear on military rolls, but are not in military service, generally used to divert salaries
- Ghost Army soldiers, members of a United States Army tactical deception unit during World War II
- Shabiha, Arabic for ghost, an ultra-loyal militia previously enforcing the rule of the Assad family in Syria

== Media ==
=== Books ===
- Ghost Soldier, a 2001 book by Elaine Marie Alphin
- Ghost Soldiers, a 2002 non-fiction book by Hampton Sides
- Ghost Soldiers, a 2003 juvenile adventure novel by Justin Richards
- Ghost Soldiers, a 2012 fiction book by Keith Melton
- Ghost Soldiers of Gettysburg: Searching for Spirits on America's Most Famous Battlefield, a 2014 book by Jack Roth and Patrick Burke
- Ghost Soldier, a 2014 book by Evelyn Klebert
- Ghost Soldier, a 2014 children's book by Theresa Breslin
- Clive Cussler Ghost Soldier, a 2024 techno-thriller espionage book by Mike Maden

=== Short stories ===
- The Ghost Soldiers, a 1981 short story and later book chapter by Tim O'Brien published in Esquire

=== Film ===
- The Ghost Soldier, a 1979 war horror directed by Scott Allen Nollen
- Ghost Soldiers, alternative title of the 2005 war film The Great Raid directed by John Dahl based on the 2002 book by Hampton Sides
- Ghost Soldier, a 2006 short film and NYU Tisch thesis directed by Allan Tsao
- Ghost Soldier, a 2026 action thriller directed by Will Eubank

== Events ==
- Ghost Soldiers, a 2016 re-enactment event across Britain memorialising the 100 year anniversary of the WWI Battle of the Somme
