= GeGeGe no Kitarō (2007 TV series) =

2007 anime TV series or program

- Genre: Supernatural; Comedy horror Yokai
- Based on: GeGeGe no Kitarō by Shigeru Mizuki
- Developed by: Keiichi Hasegawa; Riku Sanjo
- Directed by: Yukio Kaizawa
- Voices of: Minami Takayama; Isamu Tanonaka; Hiromi Konno; Wataru Takagi; Naoko Tatsuya; Keiko Yamamoto; Jōji Yanami
- Music by: Katsumi Horii
- Country of origin: Japan
- Original language: Japanese
- No. of episodes: 100

Production
- Producers: Atsuya Takase; Machiko Naruto (Fuji TV); Masato Seino (Fuji TV); Kyotaro Kimura; Shinichi Ikeda (Yomiko); Hiroyuki Sakurada (Toei Animation)
- Production companies: Fuji Television; Yomiko Advertising; Toei Animation

Original release
- Network: FNS (Fuji TV)
- Release: April 1, 2007 – March 29, 2009

Related
- 2018 anime; 1996 anime; 1985 anime; 1971 anime; 1968 anime

The fifth GeGeGe no Kitarō anime was aired from April 1, 2007, to March 29, 2009, on Fuji Television. It ran for 100 episodes and was produced by Toei Animation.

== Episodes ==
No.	Title	Directed by	Written by	Animation directed by	Art directed by	Original release date
1	"The Street Where Yōkai Dwell"; Transliteration: "Yōkai no Sumu Machi" (Japanese: 妖怪の棲む街)	Yukio Kaizawa	Keiichi Hasegawa	Setsuko Nobuzane	Tomoko Yoshida	April 1, 2007
2	"BiBiBi!! Nezumi-Otoko!"; Transliteration: "BiBiBi!! Nezumi-Otoko!" (Japanese: ビビビ!! ねずみ男!)	Hiroyuki Kakudō	Riku Sanjo	Yōsuke Yabumoto	Tetsuhiro Shimizu	April 8, 2007
3	"The Mysterious Melody! Yasha"; Transliteration: "Ayashiki Senritsu! Yasha" (Japanese: 妖しき旋律! 夜叉)	Nobutaka Nishizawa	Keiichi Hasegawa	Tomoko Itō	Kakeru Shirai	April 15, 2007
4	"Be a Man! Ittan-Momen"; Transliteration: "Otoko! Ittan-Momen" (Japanese: 男! 一反もめん)	Yutaka Tsuchida	Riku Sanjo	Kumi Nakajō	Shōji Tokiwa	April 22, 2007
5	"The Cursed Movie"; Transliteration: "Norowareta Eiga" (Japanese: 呪われた映画)	Morio Hatano	Keiichi Hasegawa	Yoshitaka Yashima	Tetsuhiro Shimizu	April 29, 2007
6	"Great Panic! Yōkai Yokochō"; Transliteration: "Dai Panikku! Yōkai Yokochō" (Japanese: 大パニック! 妖怪横町)	Hidehiko Kadota	Reiko Yoshida	Toshio Deguchi	Kakeru Shirai	May 6, 2007
7	"Burn! Medama-Oyaji"; Transliteration: "Moero! Medama-Oyaji" (Japanese: 燃えろ! 目玉おやじ)	Yukihiko Nakao	Keiichi Hasegawa	Shigetaka Kiyoyama	Makoto Shimizu	May 13, 2007
8	"An Old Adversary! Nurarihyon"; Transliteration: "Shukuteki! Nurarihyon" (Japanese: 宿敵! ぬらりひょん)	Directed by : Hirotoshi Rissen; Storyboarded by : Satoru Iriyoshi	Riku Sanjo	Setsuko Nobuzane	Tetsuhiro Shimizu	May 20, 2007
9	"The Ghost Train Goes to the Other World"; Transliteration: "Yūrei Densha Anoyo Iki" (Japanese: ゆうれい電車あの世行き)	Hiroyuki Kakudō	Keiichi Hasegawa	Yōsuke Yabumoto	Kakeru Shirai	May 27, 2007
10	"The Almighty God! Raijū"; Transliteration: "Araburu Kami! Raijū" (Japanese: 荒ぶる神! 雷獣)	Nobutaka Nishizawa	Keiichi Hasegawa	Tomoko Itō	Shōji Tokiwa	June 3, 2007
11	"Obake Comedy"; Transliteration: "Obake Manzai" (Japanese: おばけ漫才)	Directed by : Yukihiko Nakao; Storyboarded by : Yoshitaka Yashima	Reiko Yoshida	Yoshitaka Yashima	Tetsuhiro Shimizu	June 10, 2007
12	"Ringtone from the Spirit World"; Transliteration: "Reikai kara no Chakushin-on" (Japanese: 霊界からの着信音)	Tomoharu Katsumata	Keiichi Hasegawa	Akihiro Asanuma	Kakeru Shirai	June 17, 2007
13	"Working Hard! Nurikabe the Bodyguard"; Transliteration: "Funtō! Nurikabe Yōjinbō" (Japanese: 奮闘! ぬりかべ用心棒)	Morio Hatano	Riku Sanjo	Keiichi Ichikawa	Yoshiko Kitamura	June 24, 2007
14	"Kitarō Dies!? Gyūki Reborn"; Transliteration: "Kitarō Shisu!? Gyūki Fukkatsu" (Japanese: 鬼太郎死す!? 牛鬼復活)	Hiroyuki Kakudō	Keiichi Hasegawa	Shinobu Ookouchi	Tetsuhiro Shimizu	July 1, 2007
15	"Work! Medama-Oyaji"; Transliteration: "Hataraku! Medama-Oyaji" (Japanese: 働く! 目玉おやじ)	Makiko Orimoto	Reiko Yoshida	Toshio Deguchi	Kakeru Shirai	July 8, 2007
16	"Yōkai are Game Masters?!"; Transliteration: "Yōkai wa Gēmu no Tatsujin?!" (Japanese: 妖怪はゲームの達人?!)	Directed by : Hirotoshi Rissen; Storyboarded by : Satoru Iriyoshi	Riku Sanjo	Shigetaka Kiyoyama	Shōji Tokiwa	July 15, 2007
17	"Wandering Priest Aobōzu"; Transliteration: "Sasurai no Aobōzu" (Japanese: さすらいの蒼坊主)	Yutaka Tsuchida	Riku Sanjo	Setsuko Nobuzane	Tetsuhiro Shimizu	July 22, 2007
18	"Black Eyes that Glow in the Old Castle"; Transliteration: "Kojō ni Hikaru Kuroi Me" (Japanese: 古城に光る黒い眼)	Directed by : Yukihiko Nakao; Storyboarded by : Yoshitaka Yashima	Riku Sanjo	Yoshitaka Yashima	Kakeru Shirai	August 5, 2007
19	"The Kappa Pond Sumo Tournament"; Transliteration: "Kappa-chi no Sumō Taikai" (Japanese: 河童池の相撲大会)	Yukio Kaizawa	Keiichi Hasegawa	Akihiro Asanuma	Yoshiko Kitamura	August 12, 2007
20	"Voice From the Darkness! Ghost Spot"; Transliteration: "Yami kara no Koe! Yūrei Supotto" (Japanese: 闇からの声! 幽霊スポット)	Hiroyuki Kakudō	Keiichi Hasegawa	Tomoko Itō	Tetsuhiro Shimizu	August 19, 2007
21	"Madly in Love? Yōkai Love Story"; Transliteration: "Kubittake? Yōkai Koi Monogatari" (Japanese: 首ったけ? 妖怪恋物語)	Tomoharu Katsumata	Keiichi Hasegawa	Keiichi Ichikawa	Kakeru Shirai	August 26, 2007
22	"Fake Kitarō Appears!!"; Transliteration: "Nise Kitarō Genru!!" (Japanese: ニセ鬼太郎現る!!)	Nobutaka Nishizawa	Reiko Yoshida	Kumi Nakajō	Shōji Tokiwa	September 2, 2007
23	"Sazae-Oni the Gourmet!?"; Transliteration: "Bishoku-ka!? Sazae-Oni" (Japanese: 美食家!? さざえ鬼)	Toshinori Fukuzawa	Riku Sanjo	Toshio Deguchi	Masanori Nishiyama	September 9, 2007
24	"Battle in the Dreams! Makura-Gaeshi"; Transliteration: "Yume no Naka no Kettō! Makura-Gaeshi" (Japanese: 夢の中の決闘! 枕返し)	Directed by : Hirotoshi Rissen; Storyboarded by : Satoru Iriyoshi	Keiichi Hasegawa	Fusayo Ōtani	Tetsuhiro Shimizu	September 16, 2007
25	"The Great Yōkai Sports Festival"; Transliteration: "Yōkai Dai Undōkai" (Japanese: 妖怪大運動会)	Makiko Orimoto	Reiko Yoshida	Yoshitaka Yashima	Kakeru Shirai	September 23, 2007
26	"Yōkai Idol!? Amabie"; Transliteration: "Yōkai Aidoru!? Amabie" (Japanese: 妖怪アイドル!? アマビエ)	Hiroyuki Kakudō	Riku Sanjo	Setsuko Nobuzane	Makoto Shimizu	September 30, 2007
27	"The Law of Jigoku! Run, Nezumi Otoko"; Transliteration: "Jigoku no Okite! Hashire Nezumi-Otoko" (Japanese: 地獄の掟! 走れねずみ男)	Yukio Kaizawa	Keiichi Hasegawa	Akihiro Asanuma	Masanori Nishiyama	October 7, 2007
28	"Dinosaur Kitarō Appears!"; Transliteration: "Kitarō Kyōryū Genru!" (Japanese: 鬼太郎恐竜現る!)	Hidehiko Kadota	Reiko Yoshida	Yōsuke Yabumoto	Tetsuhiro Shimizu	October 14, 2007
29	"Neko-Musume's Yōkai Bus Tour"; Transliteration: "Neko-Musume no Yōkai Basu Tsuā" (Japanese: ネコ娘の妖怪バスツアー)	Morio Hatano	Riku Sanjo	Tomoko Itō	Kakeru Shirai	October 21, 2007
30	"Strategy to Kill Kitarō"; Transliteration: "Kitarō Massatsu Sakusen" (Japanese: 鬼太郎抹殺作戦)	Toshinori Fukuzawa	Keiichi Hasegawa	Kumi Nakajō	Shoji Tokiwa	October 28, 2007
31	"Yōkai Top Spinning Match!"; Transliteration: "Yōkai koma-mawashi shōbu!" (Japanese: 妖怪コマ回し勝負!)	Yutaka Tsuchida	Reiko Yoshida	Toshio Deguchi	Masanori Nishiyama	November 4, 2007
32	"Landing! The Threat of Western Yōkai"; Transliteration: "Jōriku! Kyōi no Seiyō Yōkai" (Japanese: 上陸! 脅威の西洋妖怪)	Hiroyuki Kakudō	Riku Sanjo	Fusayo Ōtani	Kakeru Shirai	November 11, 2007
33	"Great Counterattack! Japanese Yōkai"; Transliteration: "Dai Gyakushū! Nihon Yōkai" (Japanese: 大逆襲! 日本妖怪)	Yukihiko Nakao	Riku Sanjo	Yoshitaka Yashima	Yoshiko Kitamura	November 18, 2007
34	"Yōkai Yokochō's Cruise to Hell"; Transliteration: "Yōkai Yokochō no Jigoku Nagashi" (Japanese: 妖怪横丁の地獄流し)	Tomoharu Katsumata	Keiichi Hasegawa	Yōsuke Yabumoto	Masanori Nishiyama	November 25, 2007
35	"Shinigami's Paradise Tour"; Transliteration: "Shinigami no Gokuraku Tsuā" (Japanese: 死神の極楽ツアー)	Directed by : Hirotoshi Rissen; Storyboarded by : Satoru Iriyoshi	Reiko Yoshida	Akihiro Asanuma	Tetsuhiro Shimizu	December 2, 2007
36	"Medama-Oyaji's Rescue"; Transliteration: "Resukyū Medama-Oyaji" (Japanese: レスキュー目玉おやじ)	Directed by : Yukihiko Nakao; Storyboarded by : Yoshitaka Yashima	Riku Sanjo	Yoshitaka Yashima	Masanori Nishiyama	December 9, 2007
37	"Kitarō Defeated! Hatred of Kihatsu"; Transliteration: "Kitarō Haiboku! On'nen no Kihatsu" (Japanese: 鬼太郎敗北! 怨念の鬼髪)	Hiroyuki Kakudō	Keiichi Hasegawa	Kumi Nakajō	Tomoko Yoshida	December 16, 2007
38	"Nezumi-Otoko Becomes A Daddy"; Transliteration: "Papa ni natta Nezumi-Otoko" (Japanese: パパになったねずみ男)	Nobutaka Nishizawa	Shō Makura	Setsuko Nobuzane	Kakeru Shirai	December 23, 2007
39	"Nurarihyon's Last Day"; Transliteration: "Nurarihyon Saigo no Hi" (Japanese: ぬらりひょん最期の日)	Toshinori Fukuzawa	Riku Sanjo	Toshio Deguchi	Tetsuhiro Shimizu	January 6, 2008
40	"Big Fever! Kitarō Goods"; Transliteration: "Dai Fībā! Kitarō Guzzu" (Japanese: 大フィーバー! 鬼太郎グッズ)	Yukio Kaizawa	Reiko Yoshida	Fusayo Ōtani	Kakeru Shirai	January 13, 2008
41	"Overthrow Kitarō! Nezumi-Otoko's Great Counterattack"; Transliteration: "Datō Kitarō! Nezumi-Otoko Dai Gyakushū" (Japanese: 打倒鬼太郎! ねずみ男大逆襲)	Morio Hatano	Keiichi Hasegawa	Noboru Koizumi	Makoto Shimizu	January 20, 2008
42	"Yōkai of Obebe Swamp Kawauso!"; Transliteration: "Obebe-numa no Yōkai Kawauso!" (Japanese: オベベ沼の妖怪かわうそ!)	Yutaka Tsuchida	Riku Sanjo	Akihiro Asanuma	Tetsuhiro Shimizu	January 27, 2008
43	"Mysterious Yōkai Train"; Transliteration: "Yōkai Misuterī Ressha!" (Japanese: 妖怪ミステリー列車!)	Hiroyuki Kakudō	Genki Yoshimura	Yōsuke Yabumoto	Masanori Nishiyama	February 3, 2008
44	"A Rugged Medama-Oyaji!"; Transliteration: "Choi'aku! Medama-Oyaji" (Japanese: チョイ悪!目玉おやじ)	Tomoharu Katsumata	Reiko Yoshida	Yoshitaka Yashima	Kakeru Shirai	February 10, 2008
45	"Neko-Musume Abuzz!? Yōkai Maid Cafe"; Transliteration: "Neko-Musume Sōzen!? Yōkai Meido Kissa" (Japanese: ネコ娘騒然!? 妖怪メイド喫茶)	Toshinori Fukuzawa	Shō Makura	Kumi Nakajō	Kouki Tachibana	February 17, 2008
46	"Banquet of the Snake Woman, Gorgon"; Transliteration: "Hebi-Onna Gōgon no Bansan-kai" (Japanese: ヘビ女ゴーゴンの晩餐会)	Unknown	Unknown	TBA	TBA	February 24, 2008
47	"The Great Yōkai Trial"; Transliteration: "Yōkai Dai-Saiban" (Japanese: 妖怪大裁判)	Unknown	Unknown	TBA	TBA	March 2, 2008
48	"Fight! GeGeGe House"; Transliteration: "Tatakau! GeGeGe Hausu" (Japanese: 戦う! ゲゲゲハウス)	Unknown	Unknown	TBA	TBA	March 9, 2008
49	"The Seven Misaki of the Other World"; Transliteration: "Anoyo no Shichinin Misaki" (Japanese: あの世の七人ミサキ)	Unknown	Unknown	TBA	TBA	March 16, 2008
50	"The Cursed Bride! Onmoraki"; Transliteration: "Noroi no Hanayome! Onmoraki" (Japanese: 呪いの花嫁! 陰摩羅鬼)	Unknown	Unknown	TBA	TBA	March 23, 2008
51	"Neko-Musume's Tokyo Yōkai Sightseeing"; Transliteration: "Neko-Musume no Tōkyō Yōkai Kenbutsu" (Japanese: ネコ娘の東京妖怪見物)	Unknown	Unknown	TBA	TBA	March 30, 2008
52	"Terror! Yadōkai"; Transliteration: "Kyōfu! Yadōkai" (Japanese: 恐怖! 夜道怪)	Unknown	Unknown	TBA	TBA	April 6, 2008
53	"Viva Hakusanbō! Haunted House"; Transliteration: "Hakusanbō Biba! Obake Yashi" (Japanese: 白山坊ビバ！お化け屋敷)	Unknown	Unknown	TBA	TBA	April 13, 2008
54	"Vampire Elite"; Transliteration: "Kyūketsuki Erīto" (Japanese: 吸血鬼エリート)	Unknown	Unknown	TBA	TBA	April 20, 2008
55	"The Curse of Hyakume"; Transliteration: "Hyakume no Noroi" (Japanese: 百目の呪い)	Unknown	Unknown	TBA	TBA	April 27, 2008
56	"The Forbidden Cape! Iso-Onna"; Transliteration: "Kinjirareta Misaki! Iso-Onna" (Japanese: 禁じられた岬！磯女)	Unknown	Unknown	TBA	TBA	May 4, 2008
57	"The Legendary Yōkai Nue!!"; Transliteration: "Densetsu no Dai Yōkai Nue!!" (Japanese: 伝説の大妖怪鵺!!)	Unknown	Unknown	TBA	TBA	May 11, 2008
58	"Pet Yōkai! Shiro-Uneri"; Transliteration: "Petto Yōkai! Shiro-Uneri" (Japanese: ペット妖怪! 白うねり)	Unknown	Unknown	TBA	TBA	May 18, 2008
59	"Gremlins Landing in Tokyo!!"; Transliteration: "Guremurin Tōkyō Jōriku!!" (Japanese: グレムリン東京上陸!!)	Unknown	Unknown	TBA	TBA	May 25, 2008
60	"Work!! Yōkai Bari-Bari"; Transliteration: "Hatarake!! Yōkai Bari-Bari" (Japanese: 働け!! 妖怪バリバリ)	Unknown	Unknown	TBA	TBA	June 1, 2008
61	"Tantanbō of the Yōkai Castle"; Transliteration: "Yōkai-jō no Tantanbō" (Japanese: 妖怪城のたんたん坊)	Unknown	Unknown	TBA	TBA	June 8, 2008
62	"Kubire-Oni Beckons Death"; Transliteration: "Kubire-Oni ga Shi o Maneku" (Japanese: くびれ鬼が死をまねく)	Unknown	Unknown	TBA	TBA	June 15, 2008
63	"Japanese Yōkai Annihilated!? Yōkai Cloth!!"; Transliteration: "Nihon Yōkai Zenmetsu!? Yōkai Tanmono!!" (Japanese: 日本妖怪全滅!? 妖怪反物!!)	Unknown	Unknown	TBA	TBA	June 22, 2008
64	"The Night of Mōryō"; Transliteration: "Mōryō no Yoru" (Japanese: もうりょうの夜)	Unknown	Unknown	TBA	TBA	June 29, 2008
65	"Curse of the Dancing Bird! Ubume"; Transliteration: "Noroi no Tori! Ubume ga Mau" (Japanese: 呪いの鳥! うぶめが舞う)	Unknown	Unknown	TBA	TBA	July 6, 2008
66	"Sara-Kozō, Yōkai Chart Topper!"; Transliteration: "Sarakozō! Yōkai Hitto Chāto" (Japanese: さら小僧! 妖怪ヒットチャート)	Unknown	Unknown	TBA	TBA	July 13, 2008
67	"Bloodsucking Tree! Jubokko"; Transliteration: "Aruku Kyūketsu-ju! Jubokko" (Japanese: 歩く吸血樹! 樹木子)	Unknown	Unknown	TBA	TBA	July 20, 2008
68	"Huge Battle of Hell! All of the Western Yōkai Appear"; Transliteration: "Jigoku Chō Kessen! Seiyō Yōkai Sō Tōjō!" (Japanese: 地獄超決戦! 西洋妖怪総登場!)	Unknown	Unknown	TBA	TBA	August 3, 2008
69	"Kitarō's Catastrophe! Anagura-Nyūdō"; Transliteration: "Kitarō Dai iIhen! Anagura-Nyūdō" (Japanese: 鬼太郎大異変! 穴ぐら入道)	Unknown	Unknown	TBA	TBA	August 10, 2008
70	"Impossible to Kill!? Dorotabō"; Transliteration: "Taiji Fukanō!? Dorotabō" (Japanese: 退治不可能!? 泥田坊)	Unknown	Unknown	TBA	TBA	August 17, 2008
71	"Southern Yōkai Landing in Japan!!"; Transliteration: "Nanpō Yōkai Nihon Jōriku!!" (Japanese: 南方妖怪 日本上陸!!)	Unknown	Unknown	TBA	TBA	August 24, 2008
72	"Yōkai Castle Awakens!! Shu-no-Bon's Difficult War Story"; Transliteration: "Yōkai-jō Shidō!! Shu-no-Bon Fun-Senki" (Japanese: 妖怪城始動!! 朱の盆奮戦記)	Unknown	Unknown	TBA	TBA	August 31, 2008
73	"Mystery of the Forty Seven Yōkai Warriors"; Transliteration: "Yōkai Shijūshichi-Shi no Nazo" (Japanese: 妖怪四十七士の謎)	Unknown	Unknown	TBA	TBA	September 7, 2008
74	"Ittan-Momen! The Kagoshima Battle!!"; Transliteration: "Ittan-Momen! Kagoshima Kessen!!" (Japanese: 一反もめん! 鹿児島決戦!!)	Unknown	Unknown	TBA	TBA	September 14, 2008
75	"Miage-Nyūdō's Yōkai School"; Transliteration: "Miage-Nyūdō no Yōkai Gakkō" (Japanese: 見上げ入道の妖怪学校)	Unknown	Unknown	TBA	TBA	September 21, 2008
76	"Strongest Tag Battle!! Southern & Chinese Yōkai!!"; Transliteration: "Saikyō Taggu!! Nanpō & Chūgoku Yōkai!!" (Japanese: 最強タッグ!! 南方&中国妖怪!!)	Unknown	Unknown	TBA	TBA	September 28, 2008
77	"Yuki-Onna! Beautiful Vengeful Demon"; Transliteration: "Yuki-Onna! Utsukushiki Fukushū Oni" (Japanese: 雪女! 美しき復讐鬼)	Unknown	Unknown	TBA	TBA	October 5, 2008
78	"The Angry Undead! Hidarugami"; Transliteration: "Okoreru Mōja-tachi! Hidarugami" (Japanese: 怒れる亡者たち! ヒダル神)	Unknown	Unknown	TBA	TBA	October 12, 2008
79	"The Tenacious Mythological Snake! Tsuchinoko!!"; Transliteration: "Shūnen no Yōja! Tsuchinoko!!" (Japanese: 執念の妖蛇! 槌の子!!)	Unknown	Unknown	TBA	TBA	October 19, 2008
80	"Beautiful Woman and Nebutori! Continuous Yōkai Incidents"; Transliteration: "Bijo to Nebutori! Renzoku Yōkai Jiken" (Japanese: 美女と寝太り! 連続妖怪事件)	Unknown	Unknown	TBA	TBA	October 26, 2008
81	"Duel!! Yōkai Hunter vs. Hari-Onago"; Transliteration: "Kettō!! Yōkai Hantā tai Hari-Onago" (Japanese: 決闘!! 妖怪ハンター対針女)	Unknown	Unknown	TBA	TBA	November 2, 2008
82	"Parched Life! Akashita Hot Spring"; Transliteration: "Inochi Kara Kara! Akashita Onsen" (Japanese: 命カラカラ! 赤舌温泉)	Unknown	Unknown	TBA	TBA	November 9, 2008
83	"Burn! Azuki Union"; Transliteration: "Moero! Azuki Rengō" (Japanese: 燃えろ! 小豆連合)	Unknown	Unknown	TBA	TBA	November 16, 2008
84	"Noderabō! The Bell Which Echoes in the Darkness of Night"; Transliteration: "Noderabō! Yoru no Yami ni Hibiku Kane" (Japanese: 野寺坊! 夜の闇に響く鐘)	Unknown	Unknown	TBA	TBA	November 23, 2008
85	"Kitarō Screams!! Yōkai Castle's Secret Weapon!!"; Transliteration: "Kitarō Zekkyō!! Yōkai-jō no Kirifuda!!" (Japanese: 鬼太郎絶叫!! 妖怪城の切り札!!)	Unknown	Unknown	TBA	TBA	November 30, 2008
86	"Fear Approaching From Behind! Ushirogami"; Transliteration: "Haigo ni Semaru Kyōfu! Ushirogami" (Japanese: 背後に迫る恐怖! 後神)	Unknown	Unknown	TBA	TBA	December 7, 2008
87	"Titan! The Golem's Tears"; Transliteration: "Kyojin! Gōremu no Namida" (Japanese: 巨人! ゴーレムの涙)	Unknown	Unknown	TBA	TBA	December 14, 2008
88	"Yōkai Do-or-Die Spirit!! Hell Traversing Quiz!!"; Transliteration: "Yōkai Kesshi!! Jigoku Ōdan Kuizu!!" (Japanese: 妖怪決死!! 地獄横断クイズ!!)	Unknown	Unknown	TBA	TBA	December 21, 2008
89	"Miracle of Shiwasu! Kitarō is Very Busy!!"; Transliteration: "Shiwasu no Kiseki! Kitarō Dai Isogashi!!" (Japanese: 師走の奇跡! 鬼太郎大いそがし!!)	Unknown	Unknown	TBA	TBA	December 28, 2008
90	"New Year's Great Rampage! Kitarō-Kasha"; Transliteration: "Shin'nen Dai Bōsō! Kitarō Kasha" (Japanese: 新年大暴走!鬼太郎火車)	Unknown	Unknown	TBA	TBA	January 11, 2009
91	"Yōkai Teacher of Brush Writing! Hitotsume-Kozō"; Transliteration: "Yōkai Fudeshi! Hitotsume-Kozō" (Japanese: 妖怪筆師!一つ目小僧)	Unknown	Unknown	TBA	TBA	January 18, 2009
92	"Violent!! Yōkai Waterwheel!! Good Luck Nami-Kozō"; Transliteration: "Mōretsu!! Yōkai Suisha!! Ganbare Nami-Kozō" (Japanese: 猛烈!! 妖怪水車!! がんばれ浪小僧)	Unknown	Unknown	TBA	TBA	January 25, 2009
93	"The Obake Building's Yōkai Gentleman!"; Transliteration: "Obake Biru no Yōkai Shinshi!" (Japanese: おばけビルの妖怪紳士!)	Unknown	Unknown	TBA	TBA	February 1, 2009
94	"The True Form of the Guardian of Okinawa, Shisa!"; Transliteration: "Okinawa no Mamorigami Shīsā no Shōtai!" (Japanese: 沖縄の守り神シーサーの正体!)	Unknown	Unknown	TBA	TBA	February 8, 2009
95	"Yōkai Sweets! Operation Valentine"; Transliteration: "Yōkai Suītsu! Barentain Sakusen" (Japanese: 妖怪スイーツ! バレンタイン作戦)	Unknown	Unknown	TBA	TBA	February 15, 2009
96	"Strange Romance! The Yōka's Invitation"; Transliteration: "Kaiki Roman! Yōka no Sasoi" (Japanese: 怪奇ロマン! 妖花の誘い)	Unknown	Unknown	TBA	TBA	February 22, 2009
97	"Shock!! Kitarō Becomes a Cat!"; Transliteration: "Shōgeki!! Kitarō Neko ni naru!" (Japanese: 衝撃!! 鬼太郎猫になる!)	Unknown	Unknown	TBA	TBA	March 1, 2009
98	"Oyaji's Hyperemia!! Hero Kitarō!!"; Transliteration: "Oyaji Dai Jūketsu!! Yūsha Kitarō!!" (Japanese: おやじ大充血!! 勇者鬼太郎!!)	Unknown	Unknown	TBA	TBA	March 8, 2009
99	"The City's Castle Tower! Yōkai Kame-hime"; Transliteration: "Tokai no Tenshukaku! Yōkai Kame-hime" (Japanese: 都会の天守閣! 妖怪亀姫)	Unknown	Unknown	TBA	TBA	March 15, 2009
100	"Farewell, Father! The Threat of the Tengu King"; Transliteration: "Saraba Chichi yo! Kyōi no Tengu-Ō" (Japanese: さらば父よ! 脅威の天狗王)	Unknown	Unknown	TBA	TBA	March 29, 2009
