= A Regular Frankie Fan =

2000 American documentary film by Scott Mabbutt

- Directed by: Scott Mabbutt
- Written by: Scott Mabbutt
- Narrated by: Paul Williams
- Release date: 2000
- Running time: 72 minutes

A Regular Frankie Fan is a 2000 documentary film on the fans of The Rocky Horror Picture Show. It was narrated by Paul Williams and written and directed by Scott Mabbutt. The majority of the documentary was filmed at theaters screening The Rocky Horror Picture Show in and around Southern California. It was released on DVD by Liberty International Entertainment in 2001.
