= Dave Wilson (director) =

American television director (1933–2002)

Dave Wilson (May 1, 1933 – June 30, 2002) was an American television director, best known for his work as the director of the NBC program Saturday Night Live from 1975 to 1986 and 1989 to 1995. Wilson retired at the end of the show's 20th season, and also appeared on-screen as part of comedy sketches that took place in the show's control room.

During his SNL tenure, Wilson won an Emmy Award for the Paul Simon episode during the show's first season.

== Non-SNL related work ==
Also at NBC, Wilson served as a director for the late-night music performance program Sunday Night during its two-season run from 1988 to 1990, and for many other live events as well, including the Miss America Pageant.

Wilson had a brief part playing the director of the rigged game show "Twenty One" in the 1994 film Quiz Show.

== Death ==
Wilson died of an aortic aneurysm in Parsippany, New Jersey on June 30, 2002. He was 69.
