= Scott Allen Nollen =

American author (born 1963)

Scott Allen Nollen is an American author known for writing about the history of film, music, literature and African American studies.

== Early life ==
He was born on April 2, 1963, in Harlan, Iowa. His father, Harold N. Nollen, served in the United States Coast Guard prior to running a successful petroleum distribution business, to which his mother, Shirley A. (Stoltz) Nollen, also contributed. Nollen was educated at the University of Iowa (1984-1989), where he received Bachelor's Degrees in Broadcasting and Film and Honors History, Phi Beta Kappa, and a Master's Degree in U.S., Modern European and African-American History. From 1991 to 2001, he served as an archivist and historian for the National Archives and Records Administration.

== Career ==
Scott Allen Nollen became intrigued with Boris Karloff when his mother had him watch James Whale's Frankenstein (1931) at the age of five in 1968. He identified with Karloff's "monster", who never spoke in the film, but effectively conveyed a portrait of the misunderstood individual cast out by society.

Nollen knew he wanted to write a book about Karloff and had begun in high school. In 1981, Nollen's parents took him to England and Wales as a graduation present. While there, he contacted Karloff's widow, who appreciated Nollen's interest in and respect for Karloff; they remained in correspondence for the twelve years remaining of her life.

Nollen's literary collaborators include science-fiction legend Ray Bradbury, author-filmmakers Nicholas Meyer and Michael A. Hoey (son of actor Dennis Hoey), British musicians Ian Anderson and Dave Pegg, R&B singer Ruth Pointer, celebrity offspring Dame Jean Conan Doyle (Sir Arthur Conan Doyle), Sara Jane Karloff (Boris Karloff) and Chris Costello (Lou Costello), and film historians Paul M. Jensen and Gregory William Mank.

Nollen says about the 26 books he has produced in 32 years,

Writing scholarly books is a poverty-generating career: One spends far more on the projects than is recouped in royalties. Book sales are now about 25% of what they were just a few years ago, so these volumes are always a labor of love and an attempt to discover the truth for people who like to read, a group dwindling rapidly. The challenge, as a trained research historian—a detective, really—is always the effort to remain as “objective” as possible, to whatever extent that is possible.

Cliff Aliperti states regarding Nollen's incredibly prolific output, "This large body of work is all the more amazing when I take my experience with Boris Karloff: A Gentleman's Life into account... it's as exhaustively-researched a biography as you're going to find on the market, not just about Karloff, but any subject."

Nollen was chosen by the National Film Registry at the Library of Congress to write permanently held essays to accompany a group of films selected by the registry for preservation. Specifically, Nollen wrote the essays for Stagecoach, The Quiet Man, The Searchers and The Man Who Shot Liberty Valance all of which were directed by John Ford. He also wrote the essay for The Emperor Jones, with actor Paul Robeson.

== Death ==
Nollen died in 2021. His wife, Yuyun Yuningsih Nollen, made this announcement on Facebook: "My husband, Scott Allen Nollen had passed away in Thursday, August 12, 2021 at 20:20 o'clock local time at Indonesia." No further details were released.

== Literary and Cinematic Works ==
Nollen's Boris Karloff: A Critical Account of His Screen, Stage, Radio, Television and Recording Work (1991) and Boris Karloff: A Gentleman’s Life (1999) were highly praised by classic film site Immortal Ephemera. His other well-regarded books include Robert Louis Stevenson: Life, Literature and the Silver Screen (1994), Sir Arthur Conan Doyle at the Cinema: A Critical Study of the Film Adaptations (1996), Jethro Tull: A History of the Band, 1968-2001 (2001), Louis Armstrong: The Life, Music and Screen Career (2004), Warners Wiseguys: All 112 Films that Robinson, Cagney and Bogart Made for the Studio (2007), Abbott and Costello on the Home Front: A Critical History of The Wartime Films (2009), Paul Robeson: Film Pioneer (2010), Three Bad Men: John Ford, John Wayne, Ward Bond (2013) and Glenda Farrell: Hollywood's Hardboiled Dame (2014).

In 2016, Nollen published The Making and Influence of I Am a Fugitive from a Chain Gang, regarding the 1932 film. The book was reviewed as "a fascinating account of the film's production," for which Robert E. Burns, the author of the autobiography on which it was based, served as an advisor."

Also a well-known authority on the life, music and films of Frank Sinatra, Nollen wrote The Cinema of Sinatra: The Actor, on Screen and in Song (2003), co-wrote the Grammy-nominated book for the Time-Warner CD box set Frank Sinatra in Hollywood 1940-1964 (2002), and frequently can be heard on the Hawaii Public Radio show Sinatra: The Man and the Music, hosted by Guy Steele.

In July 2018, Nollen was included as a commentator in the BBC2 Radio program Double Acts: Abbott and Costello, hosted by Dame Barbara Windsor, also featuring archival recordings of Bud Abbott, Lou Costello, The Andrews Sisters, Martha Raye and Ella Fitzgerald.

Nollen's 2019 book, Takashi Shimura: Chameleon of Japanese Cinema, was praised by journalist Jordan R. Young as "likely to stand as the definitive study of this versatile character actor." Jordan wrote that Nollen "is to be commended not only for his research but his erudite discourse on Japanese cinema...and Shimura’s role in it—something few Westerners could hope to attempt with such intelligent results."

Nollen and his wife, Yuyun Yuningsih Nollen, collaborated on Chester Morris: His Life and Career in 2019. In his review of the book, author James L. Neibaur called Nollen "one of the foremost film historians in the literary world, [who] now benefits from the assistance of his wife, Yuyun Yuningsih Nollen." Together, they have completed the third volume of Nollen's "Karloff Trilogy," Karloff and the East: Asian, Indian, Middle Eastern and Oceanian Characters and Subjects in His Screen Career, a massive tome covering the actor's entire life and career while devoting separate chapters to many neglected films, and are collaborating on the first-ever book on Asian American trailblazers Keye Luke, Victor Sen Yung and Benson Fong. They also are collaborating on one further classic actor biography and cinematic study, Charlie Red: The Life and Career of Charles Bickford.

In 2019, Nollen provided new commentary for seven films included in a first-ever blu-ray set of the Universal career of Abbott and Costello. He also has completed two new books on specific classic films based on literature: The Body Snatcher: Cold-Blooded Murder, Robert Louis Stevenson and the Making of a Horror Film Classic and Sir Arthur Conan Doyle's Sherlock Holmes at Universal (1942-1946), a collaboration with collector Kris Marentette. Another volume on "golden-age" Japanese cinema, The Films of Setsuko Hara: Madonna of Japanese Cinema is also forthcoming. Alternately, he narrates "audio book" versions of his own works and those of other authors.

Nollen's film work includes writing and directing a series of U.S. government documentaries, co-writing and co-directing (with his nephew, Ryan Baumbach) the independent feature Lofty (2005), and co-writing the scripts for the award-winning documentaries Kreating Karloff (2006) and Finnigan's War (2013), directed by Conor Timmis. Shot entirely on location in West Java, Indonesia, the independent film Five Indo Samurai, an homage to Japanese filmmaker Akira Kurosawa, featuring Yuyun Yuningsih Nollen in the lead role and other performers from Indonesia, Japan and the United States, and written and directed by Nollen, was released in August 2019.

== Books ==
- The Boys: The Cinematic World of Laurel and Hardy. McFarland, 1989. ISBN 978-0786411153.
- Boris Karloff: A Critical Account of His Screen, Stage, Radio, Television and Recording Work. McFarland, 1991. ISBN 978-0786440733.
- Robert Louis Stevenson: Life, Literature and the Silver Screen. McFarland, 1994. ISBN 978-0786467129.
- Sir Arthur Conan Doyle at the Cinema: A Critical History of the Film Adaptations. McFarland, 1996. ISBN 978-0786421244.
- Midnight Marquee Actors Series: Vincent Price. Midnight Marquee, 1998. ISBN 978-1887664219.
- Boris Karloff: A Gentleman’s Life. Midnight Marquee, 1999. ISBN 978-1887664233.
- Midnight Marquee Actors Series: Peter Lorre. Midnight Marquee, 1999. ISBN 978-1887664301.
- Robin Hood: A Cinematic History of the English Outlaw and His Scottish Counterparts. McFarland, 1999. ISBN 978-0786437573.
- Jethro Tull: A History of the Band, 1968-2001. McFarland, 2001. ISBN 978-0786411016.
- Frank Sinatra in Hollywood 1940-1964. Reprise/Warner Bros., 2002. ASIN B000066BN9.
- The Cinema of Sinatra: The Actor, on Screen and in Song. Luminary Press, 2003. ISBN 978-1887664516.
- Louis Armstrong: The Life, Music and Screen Career. McFarland, 2004. ISBN 978-0786418572.
- Midnight Marquee Actors Series: Peter Cushing. Midnight Marquee, 2004. ISBN 978-1887664530.
- Warners Wiseguys: All 112 Films that Edward G. Robinson, James Cagney and Humphrey Bogart Made for the Studio. McFarland, 2007. ISBN 978-0786432622.
- Abbott and Costello on the Home Front: A Critical Study of the Wartime Films. McFarland, 2009. ISBN 978-0786435210.
- Jilly! Sinatra's Right-Hand Man. Vegas Broom Press, 2009. ISBN 978-0578009216.
- Paul Robeson: Film Pioneer. McFarland, 2010. ISBN 978-0786435203.
- Three Bad Men: John Ford, John Wayne, Ward Bond. McFarland, 2013. ISBN 978-0786458547.
- Black Diamond: The Real Illusion. Midnight Marquee, 2013. ISBN 978-1936168361.
- Glenda Farrell: Hollywood's Hardboiled Dame. Midnight Marquee, 2014. ISBN 978-1936168477.
- It's the Disney Version!. Rowman & Littlefield, 2016. ISBN 978-1442266063.
- The Making and Influence of I Am a Fugitive from a Chain Gang. McFarland, 2016. ISBN 978-0786466771.
- The American Civil War on Film and TV: Blue and Gray in Black and White and Color. Lexington Books, 2017. ISBN 978-1498566889.
- Takashi Shimura: Chameleon of Japanese Cinema. McFarland, 2019. ISBN 978-1476670133.
- Chester Morris: His Life and Career. With Yuyun Yuningsih Nollen. McFarland, 2020. ISBN 978-1476677293.
- Karloff and the East: Asian, Indian, Middle Eastern and Oceanian Characters and Subjects in His Screen Career. With Yuyun Yuningsih Nollen. McFarland, 2021. ISBN 978-1476680637.
- The Body Snatcher: Cold-Blooded Murder, Robert Louis Stevenson and the Making of a Horror Film Classic. With Yuyun Yuningsih Nollen. BearManor Media, 2021. ISBN 978-1629336947.
- Sir Arthur Conan Doyle's Sherlock Holmes at Universal (1942-1946). With Kris Marentette. BearManor Media, forthcoming.
- Sons of Charlie Chan: Keye Luke, Sen Yung, Benson Fong. With Yuyun Yuningsih Nollen. BearManor Media, forthcoming.
- The Films of Setsuko Hara: Madonna of Japanese Cinema. McFarland, forthcoming. ISBN 978-1-4766-7265-6.
- Charlie Red: The Life and Career of Charles Bickford. With Yuyun Yuningsih Nollen. BearManor Media, forthcoming.
- Lawman: A Companion to the Classic TV Western Series. By Bill Levy. Narrated by Scott Allen Nollen. BearManor Media/Blackstone Audio book, 2020.ASIN B086VNC9QK.
- Henry Brandon: King of the Bogeymen. By Bill Cassara and Richard S. Greene. Narrated by Scott Allen Nollen. BearManor Digital, 2020.
