= Frankenstein (comics) =

Frankenstein, in comics, may refer to:

- Frankenstein (DC Comics), from DC Comics' Seven Soldiers
- Frankenstein (Dell Comics), the star of a short-lived series by Dell Comics
- Frankenstein's Monster (Marvel Comics), from Marvel Comics' The Monster of Frankenstein
  - Frankenstein, a clone of the Marvel Comics character that appeared in the comic book series Nick Fury's Howling Commandos.
- Frankenstein (Prize Comics), a 1940 to 1954 version by writer-artist Dick Briefer
- Frankenstein Monster, a Wildstorm character who has appeared in Wetworks

It may also refer to:

- I, Frankenstein, a series by Darkstorm Comics which inspired a film
- Doc Frankenstein, a series written by the Wachowskis
- Frankenstein, the central character in Death Race 2020 a comic book sequel to the film Death Race 2000, based on the character played by David Carradine
- "Frankenstein Meets Shirley Temple", a story in A1 by Roger Langridge
- Frankenstein: Monster Mayhem, a 2005 comic from Dead Dog Comics
- Super Frankenstein, a parody produced by Big Bang Comics
- "Universal Monsters: Frankenstein", one-shot from Dark Horse Comics
- Young Frankenstein (comics), a DC character and member of the Teen Titans
- Embalming: The Another Tale of Frankenstein, a Japanese manga series written and illustrated by Nobuhiro Watsuki.
- Frank, a depiction of Frankenstein's Monster in the comic Screamland

It may also refer to the similar-sounding:

- Frankenstein Mobster, a 2003 series from Image Comics

Elseworlds titles that retell the story through well-known superheroes:

- Batman: Castle of the Bat
- The Superman Monster

== See also ==
- Frankenstein (disambiguation)
- Frankenstein in popular culture § Comics, for a list of appearances and comic book adaptations of the story
