= Mary Shelley's Frankenstein =

Frankenstein is a novel by Mary Shelley.

Mary Shelley's Frankenstein may refer to:

- Mary Shelley's Frankenstein (film), 1994 film adaptation of Mary Shelley's novel Frankenstein
  - Mary Shelley's Frankenstein (pinball), 1995 pinball machine based on the film
  - Mary Shelley's Frankenstein (video game), video game for multiple platforms based on the film

== See also ==
- Frankenstein (disambiguation)
