= Frankenstein (disambiguation) =

Frankenstein is a 19th-century novel by Mary Shelley.

Frankenstein may also refer to:

== The novel ==
- Victor Frankenstein, the title character of Shelley's novel
- Frankenstein's monster, the central subject of Shelley's novel

== Castles ==
- Frankenstein Castle, Hesse, a 13th-century hilltop castle near Darmstadt, Germany, speculated to be the eponym for Shelley's novel
- Frankenstein Castle, Palatinate, a 12th-century hilltop castle above the village of Frankenstein, Rhineland-Palatinate in the Palatinate region of Germany

== Film, television, and stage ==
=== Film ===
- Frankenstein (1910 film), written and directed by J. Searle Dawley
- Frankenstein (1931 film), directed by James Whale and the first to star Boris Karloff as the title monster
- Flesh for Frankenstein, titled Andy Warhol's Frankenstein for American release, 1973, directed by Paul Morrissey
- Frankenstein (1973 film), an American made-for-television film written and produced by Dan Curtis
- Frankenstein: The True Story, a 1973 British made-for-television film
- Frankenstein (1992 film), a British made-for-television film
- Mary Shelley's Frankenstein (film), 1994, directed by Kenneth Branagh
- Frankenstein (2004 film), directed by Marcus Nispel
- Frankenstein (2007 film), an adaptation shown on ITV
- Frankenstein (2015 film), a straight-to-video adaptation starring Carrie-Anne Moss and Danny Huston
- Frankenstein (Death Race), a central character in the film series
- Frankenstein (2025 film), directed by Guillermo del Toro

=== Television ===
==== Episodes ====
- "Frankenstein", Astro Boy (1963) episode 2 (1963)
- "Frankenstein", Astro Boy (1980) episode 6 (1980)
- "Frankenstein", NBC Matinee Theater season 2, episode 99 (1957)
- "Frankenstein", Tales of Tomorrow season 1, episode 16 (1952)
- "Frankenstein", The Letdown series 1, episode 2 (2017)
- "Frankenstein: The True Story", The True Story episode 6 (2007)

==== Shows ====
- Frankenstein (miniseries), a 2004 Hallmark Channel adaptation
- Second Chance (2016 TV series), a Fox series originally titled Frankenstein

==== Characters ====
- Dr. Frankenstein and his monster, in the series Penny Dreadful

=== Theatre ===
- Frankenstein (play), any of several stage adaptations
- Frankenstein (2011 play), by Nick Dear, directed by Danny Boyle

== Comics ==
- Frankenstein (DC Comics), a character in Seven Soldiers
- Frankenstein (Dell Comics), the star of a short-lived series
- Frankenstein's Monster (Marvel Comics), a character in The Monster of Frankenstein
- Frankenstein (Prize Comics), a 1940 to 1954 version by writer-artist Dick Briefer
- Frankenstein, a main character in the Korean manhwa series: Noblesse

== Music ==
- "Frankenstein" (instrumental), a 1973 song by The Edgar Winter Group
- "Frankenstein", a song by Accept from Humanoid, 2024
- "Frankenstein", a song by Aimee Mann from I'm with Stupid, 1995
- "Frankenstein", a song by Clutch from Pure Rock Fury, 2001
- "Frankenstein", a song by Iced Earth from Horror Show, 2001
- "Frankenstein", a song by New York Dolls from New York Dolls, 1973
- Frankenstein, an opera by Mark Grey
- Frankenstein: The Modern Prometheus, an opera by Libby Larsen
- Frankenstrat or Frankenstein, a guitar used by Eddie Van Halen

== Games ==
- Frankenstein: The Monster Returns, a 1990 video game for the Nintendo Entertainment System
- Frankenstein: Through the Eyes of the Monster, a 1995 graphic adventure computer game
- Frankenstein (video game), a 1987 text adventure by CRL Group
- Frankenstein's Monster (video game), 1983, published by Data Age

== Places ==
- Frankenstein, Missouri, an unincorporated community
- Frankenstein, Rhineland-Palatinate, a municipality in Germany
- Frankenstein, Saxony, a municipality in Germany
- The former name of Ząbkowice Śląskie, a city in Lower Silesia Voivodeship, Poland

== People ==
- Frankenstein (rapper) (active 1990s – early 2000s), Canadian hip hop artist
- Frankenstein (wrestler) (1976–2010), Mexican professional wrestler
- Alfred Frankenstein (1906–1981), art and music critic
- Clement von Franckenstein (1944–2019), Austrian-British actor
- Doyle Wolfgang von Frankenstein (born 1964), American lead guitarist of Doyle (ex-Misfits)
- Jeff Frankenstein, keyboardist for Newsboys
- Karl Frankenstein (1905–1990), Israeli professor in special education and pedagogy
- Walter Frankenstein (1924–2025), German-Swedish Holocaust survivor
- Willi Mentz (1904–1978), German SS officer at Treblinka extermination camp, nicknamed "Frankenstein"
- Leah Baird (born Ada Frankenstein, 1883–1971), American actress

== Other uses ==
- Dean Koontz's Frankenstein, a series of modern suspense novels

== See also ==
- List of films featuring Frankenstein's monster
- Frankenstein (comics)
- Frankenstein veto, a concept in US legislature
- House of Franckenstein, a Franconian noble family
- Franken Stein, a character in Gangan Comics' Soul Eater
- Franken Stein, a character from Blood Lad
- Frankie Stein, a character from the doll franchise Monster High
- Jacob August Franckenstein (1689–1733), 18th century encyclopedist
