= Frankenstein in popular culture =

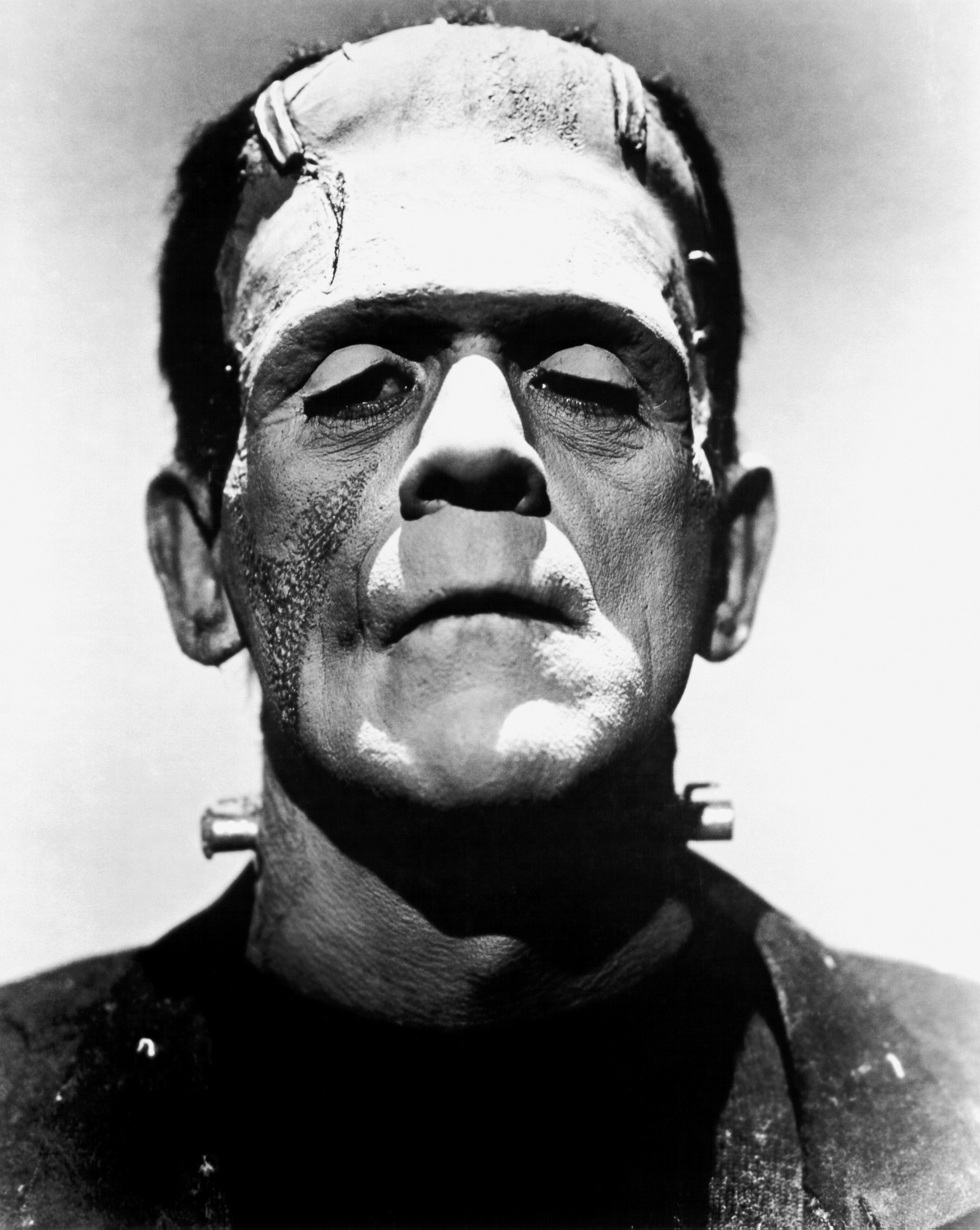
Boris Karloff as Frankenstein's monster in Bride of Frankenstein (1935)

Mary Shelley's 1818 novel Frankenstein; or, The Modern Prometheus, and the famous character of Frankenstein's monster, have influenced popular culture for at least a century. The work has inspired numerous films, television programs, video games and derivative works. The character of the Monster remains one of the most recognized icons in horror fiction.

== Film derivatives ==
=== Silent era ===
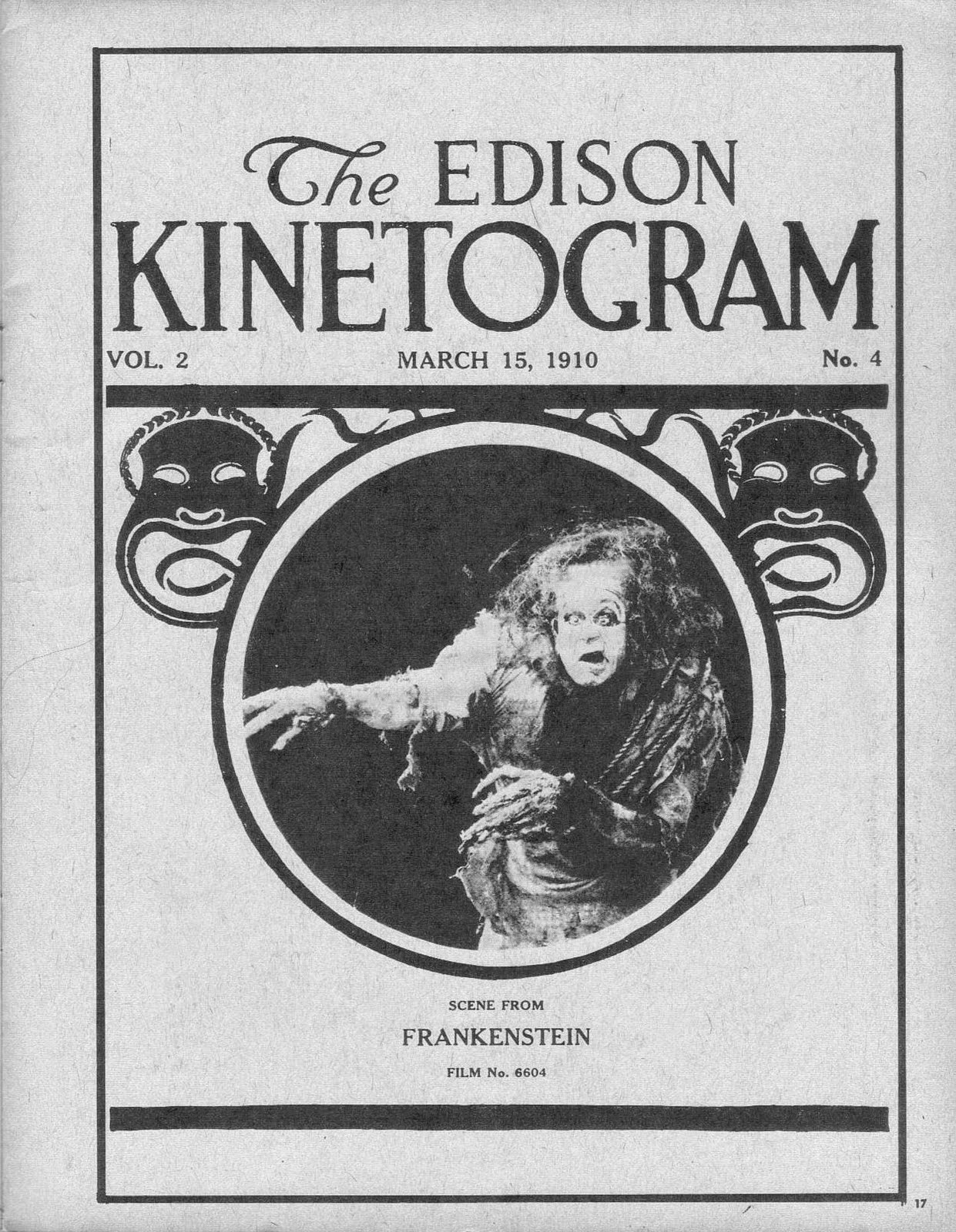
The first film adaptation of Frankenstein in 1910 by Edison Studios

The first film adaptation of the tale, Frankenstein, was made by Edison Studios in 1910, written and directed by J. Searle Dawley, with Augustus Phillips as Frankenstein, Mary Fuerte as Elizabeth, and Charles Ogle as the Monster. The brief (16 min.) story has Frankenstein chemically create the Creature in a vat. The Creature has encounters with the scientist until Frankenstein's wedding night, when true love causes the Creature to vanish. For many years, this film was believed lost. A collector announced in 1980 that he had acquired a print in the 1950s and had been unaware of its rarity.

The Edison version was followed soon after by another adaptation entitled Life Without Soul (1915), directed by Joseph W. Smiley, starring William A. Cohill as Dr. William Frawley, a modern-day Frankenstein who creates a soulless man, played to much critical praise by Percy Standing, who wore little make-up in the role. The film was shot at various locations around the United States, and reputedly featured much spectacle. In the end, it turns out that a young man has dreamed the events of the film after falling asleep reading Mary Shelley's novel. This film is now considered a lost film.

There was also at least one European film version, the Italian The Monster of Frankenstein (Il Mostro di Frankenstein) in 1921. The film's producer, Luciano Albertini, essayed the role of Frankenstein, with the Creature being played by Umberto Guarracino, and Eugenio Testa directing from a screenplay by Giovanni Drivetti. This film is also now considered lost.

=== Universal Pictures ===
Trailer for Universal Pictures' science-fiction horror film Frankenstein (1931)

The first sound adaptation of the story, Frankenstein (1931), was produced by Universal Pictures, directed by James Whale, and starred Boris Karloff as the creature. The film has been selected for preservation in the United States National Film Registry. Its sequel, The Bride of Frankenstein (1935) was also directed by Whale with Karloff as the Creature. It was followed by Son of Frankenstein (1939), the last of the three films with Karloff as the Creature. The Ghost of Frankenstein (1942) marked the Universal series' descent into B movie territory; later efforts by the studio combined two or more monsters, culminating in the comedy Abbott and Costello Meet Frankenstein. The later Universal films in which the Monster appears (and the actors who played him) are:

1. The Ghost of Frankenstein (1942 – Lon Chaney Jr.)
2. Frankenstein Meets the Wolf Man (1943 – Béla Lugosi, with Eddie Parker, Gil Perkins, and a possible third stuntman often doubling)
3. The House of Frankenstein (1944 – Glenn Strange)
4. House of Dracula (1945 – Strange)
5. Abbott and Costello Meet Frankenstein (1948 – Strange, with Lon Chaney Jr. taking the role for one scene).

=== Hammer Films ===
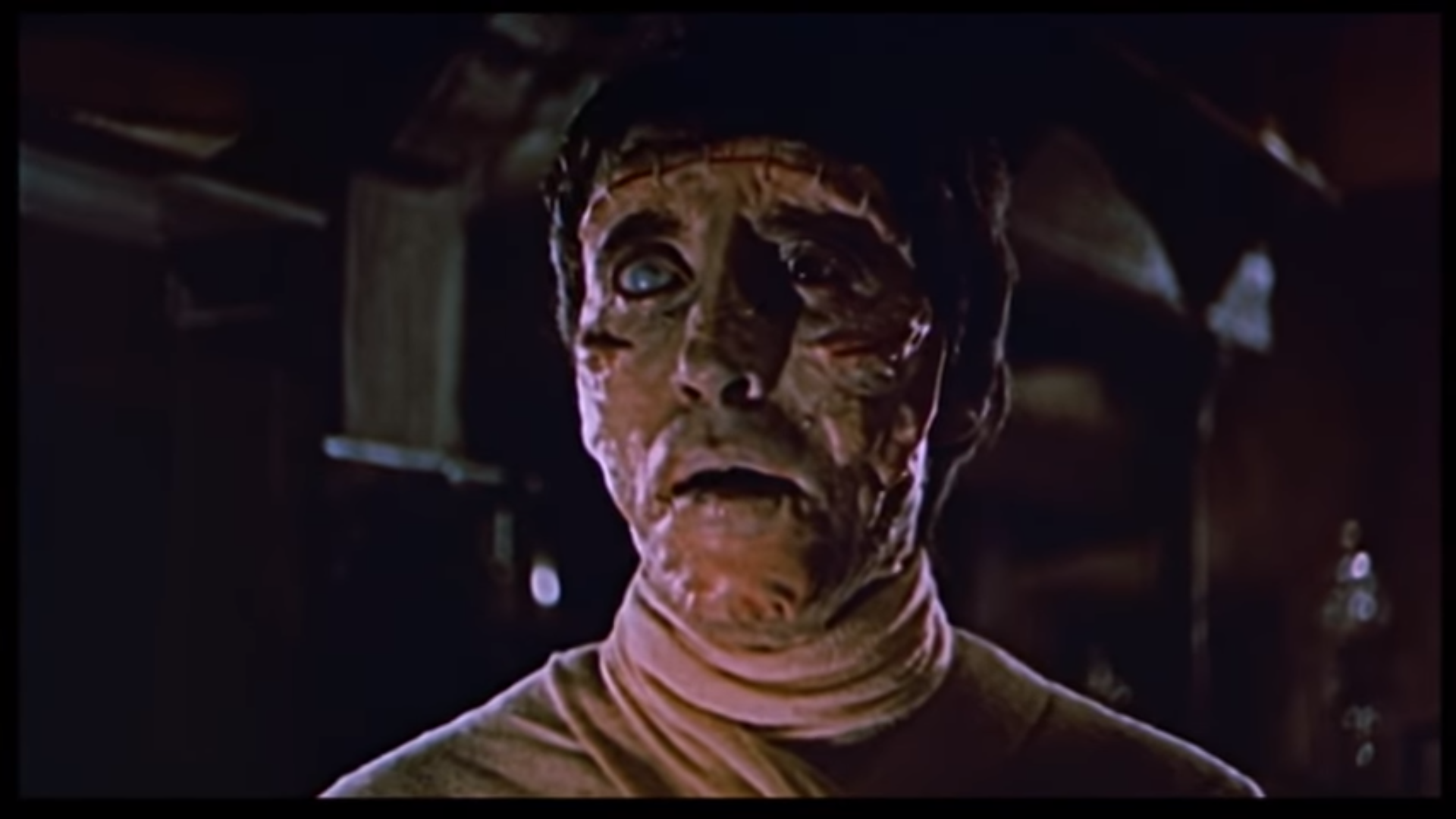
Christopher Lee in The Curse of Frankenstein (1957)

In Great Britain, a long-running series by Hammer Films focused on the character of Dr Frankenstein (usually played by Peter Cushing) rather than his monster. Peter Cushing played Dr Frankenstein in all of the films except for The Horror of Frankenstein, in which the character was played by Ralph Bates. Cushing also played a creation in The Revenge of Frankenstein. David Prowse played two different Creatures.

The Hammer films are a series in the loosest sense since there is only tenuous continuity between the films after the first two (which are, by contrast, carefully connected). Starting with The Evil of Frankenstein, the films are standalone stories with occasional vague references to previous films, much the way the James Bond films form a series. In some of the films, the Baron is a kindly, even heroic figure, while in others he is ruthless, cruel and clearly the villain of the piece.

The Hammer Films series (and the actor playing the Creature) consisted of:

1. The Curse of Frankenstein (1957 – Christopher Lee)
2. The Revenge of Frankenstein (1958 – two Creatures: Michael Gwynn and Peter Cushing)
3. The Evil of Frankenstein (1964 – Kiwi Kingston)
4. Frankenstein Created Woman (1967 – Susan Denberg)
5. Frankenstein Must Be Destroyed (1969 – Freddie Jones)
6. The Horror of Frankenstein (1970 – David Prowse) - a black comedy remake of The Curse of Frankenstein
7. Frankenstein and the Monster from Hell (1974 – David Prowse)

In 1959, Hammer shot a half-hour pilot episode for a TV series to be called Tales of Frankenstein in association with Columbia Pictures. Anton Diffring played the Baron, and Don Megowan his creation. Curt Siodmak directed. The series was scrapped, largely because of the two companies' disagreement over what the basic thrust of the series would be: Hammer wanted to do a series about Baron Frankenstein involved in various misadventures, while Columbia wanted a series of science fiction stories loosely based around the idea of science gone wrong. Though unreleased at the time of its production, the episode is available on DVD from several public domain sources.

=== Other films ===
Depictions of the Monster have varied widely, from a savage, mindless brute to the depiction of the Monster as a kind of tragic hero (closest to the Shelley version in behavior) in Mary Shelley's Frankenstein, The Bride, and Van Helsing. Throughout the Universal series, he evolved from the latter to the former.

Four films have depicted the genesis of the Frankenstein story in 1816: Gothic directed by Ken Russell (1986), Haunted Summer directed by Ivan Passer (1988), and Remando al viento (English title: Rowing with the Wind) directed by Gonzalo Suárez (1988) and Mary Shelley directed by Haifaa al-Mansour (2017). The opening scene of Bride of Frankenstein also dealt with this event.

==== 1950s and 1960s ====
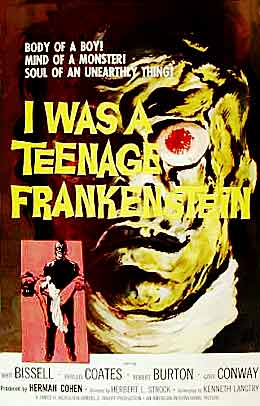
I Was a Teenage Frankenstein (1957)

- 1957: American International Pictures (AIP) released the low-budget I Was a Teenage Frankenstein in November 1957, a few months after its successful I Was a Teenage Werewolf. In a desperate and vain attempt to be viewed as a great scientist, an unscrupulous professor creates a monster out of parts of teenagers killed in a car crash, then later directs his creation to kill a good-looking teenager to replace the monster's disfigured face. Whit Bissell stars as Professor Frankenstein, and Gary Conway plays the creature. A follow-up, How to Make a Monster, was released in July 1958. This film features actor Gary Conway as an actor playing the Teenage Frankenstein in a film.
- 1958: Another differing adaptation is the 1958 film Frankenstein 1970, which focuses on the themes of nuclear power, impotence, and the film industry. Boris Karloff stars as Baron Victor von Frankenstein, who harvests the bodies of actors to create a clone of himself using his nuclear-powered laboratory. His intention is to have this clone carry on his genes into future generations.
- 1958: This year also brought the bizarre Frankenstein's Daughter, in which a modern descendant of Frankenstein (Donald Murphy) experiments with a Jekyll/Hyde type of serum before stitching together a grotesque female creature. John Ashley and Sandra Knight co-starred.
- 1961: Frankenstein, el Vampiro y Cia ("Frankenstein, the Vampire and Company") is a Mexican remake of Abbott and Costello Meet Frankenstein.
- 1965: Ishirō Honda's 1965 tokusatsu kaiju film Frankenstein vs. Baragon was produced by Toho Company Ltd. The film's prologue is set in World War II; the Monster's heart is stolen by Nazis from the laboratory of Dr. Reisendorf in war-torn Frankfurt, and taken to Imperial Japan. Immortal, the heart survives the atomic bombing of Hiroshima and, by 15 years later, has regenerated a new body which feeds on protein, eventually growing into a giant humanoid monster named Frankenstein that breaks loose and battles the burrowing dinosaur Baragon that was destroying villages and devouring people and animals. There is also a loose sequel to this film (see below).
- 1965: Frankenstein Meets the Space Monster. Martians come to Earth to steal Earth's women with the goal of repopulating their planet. When they cause a NASA space craft to crash, the humanoid robot pilot (Captain Frank Saunders) becomes horribly disfigured. Becoming a "Frankenstein"-like monster, he must save the women of Earth.
- 1966: Jesse James Meets Frankenstein's Daughter. Director William Beaudine's sci-fi\Western contribution has what would actually be Frankenstein's granddaughter, Maria Frankenstein, cobbling a monster out of Jesse James' (John Lupton) brawny partner-in-crime, Hank Tracy (Cal Bolder), after an ambush by the law. Frankenstein renames her creation Igor. Narda Onyx plays Maria Frankenstein.
- 1966: The War of the Gargantuas (Furankenshutain no Kaijû: Sanda tai Gaira), also directed by Honda, is a loose sequel to Frankenstein vs. Baragon (although this fact is obscured in the U.S. version), with samples of Frankenstein's cells growing into two giant humanoid brother monsters: Sanda (the Brown Gargantua), the strong and gentle monster raised by scientists in his youth, and Gaira (the Green Gargantua), the violent and savage monster who devours humans. The two monsters eventually battle each other in Tokyo.

==== 1970s and 1980s ====
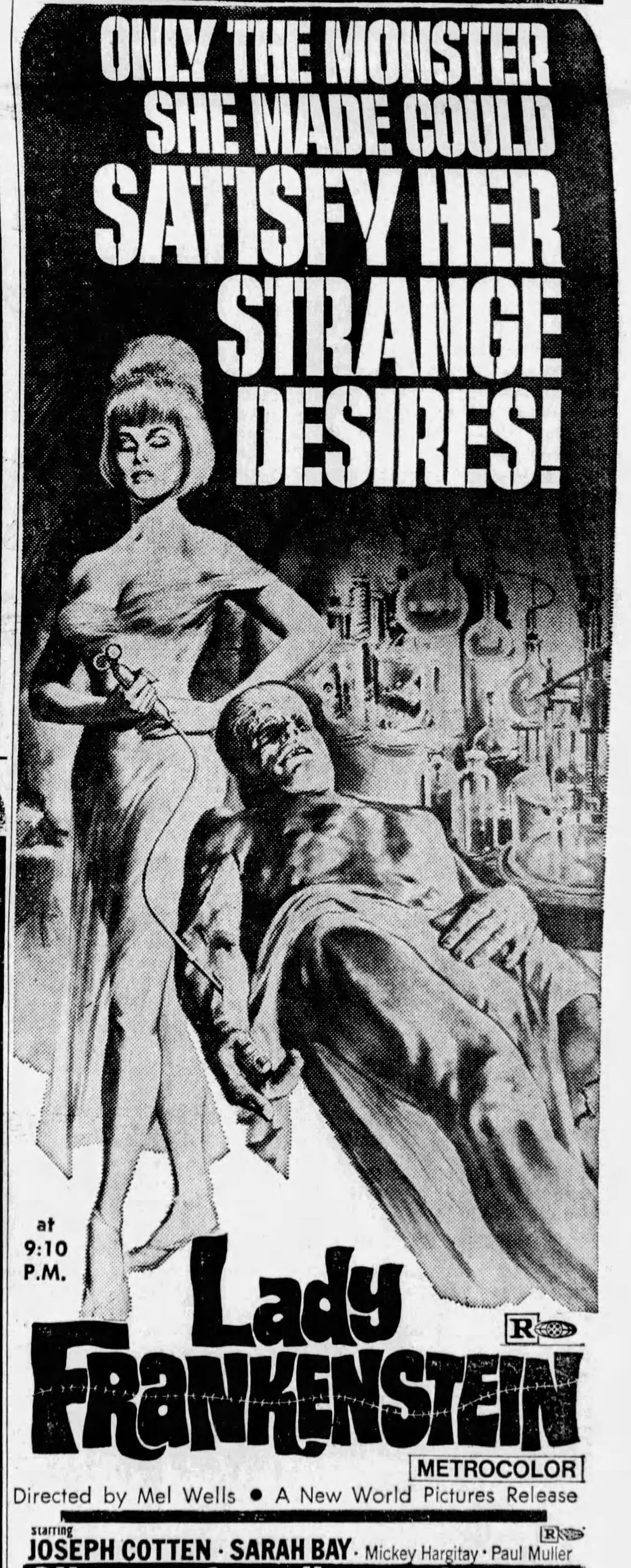
Lady Frankenstein (1971)

- 1971: Dracula vs. Frankenstein by Al Adamson is an extremely low-budget horror thriller, starring aged film stars J. Carroll Naish and Lon Chaney Jr. In the film, Count Dracula (Zandor Vorkov) has the last living descendant of Frankenstein (Naish) revive his famous ancestor's creation (played by John Bloom).
- 1971: The Italian La Figlia di Frankenstein ("The Daughter of Frankenstein"), released in North America as Lady Frankenstein. Joseph Cotten plays Baron Frankenstein, who is killed by his creation early in the film. Sara Bay, as the Baron's daughter, creates her own creature from a handsome young man and the brain of her homely but brilliant lover (Paul Muller).
- 1972: Jesús Franco contributed Dracula contra Frankenstein ("Dracula vs. Frankenstein"), which hit the North American drive-in circuit as Dracula, Prisoner of Frankenstein. Baron Frankenstein (played by Dennis Price) revives Count Dracula (Howard Vernon) in order to enslave an army of vampires to help his Monster (Fred Harrison) conquer the world.
- 1972: Franco followed up his Dracula/Frankenstein effort with The Erotic Rites of Frankenstein (also known as The Curse of Frankenstein, but having no relation to the Hammer film of the same name). Here, Baron Frankenstein (Dennis Price again) is killed off early on by minions of the evil Count Cagliostro (Howard Vernon), who wants to use the Monster in his plots to rule the world.
- 1972: Frankenstein '80, a film by Mario Mancini, featured a modern-day scientist named Albrechtstein (Gordon Mitchell) creating a monster called Mosaico (Xiro Papas). Mosaico is driven to homicidal mania by lust, and by his body's constant rejection of its constituent parts. The ingenue was played by Dalila Di Lazzaro (under the pseudonym "Dalila Parker"), who later appeared as the female creation in 1973's Flesh for Frankenstein (see below).
- 1973: Blackenstein, a low-budget blaxploitation film.
- 1973: Andy Warhol's Flesh for Frankenstein has Udo Kier playing the Baron, a bizarre but brilliant scientist who creates a male and a female creature in the hopes of breeding a superior race. Joe Dallesandro plays the handyman who attempts to thwart the Baron's mad dream, and Monique van Vooren is the Baron's nymphomaniac wife.
- 1974: Young Frankenstein, a comedy/horror film based on Boris Karloff's three Frankenstein films made by Universal.
- 1976: Victor Frankenstein (a.k.a. Terror of Frankenstein), a fairly faithful version of the book, starred Leon Vitali as Frankenstein. Per Oscarson played the creature.
- 1981: Another Japanese version, this one animated, was Kyofu Densetsu: Kaiki! Furankenshutain (titled in the U.S. simply Frankenstein) which was released in 1981.
- 1984: Frankenstein's Great Aunt Tillie, a comedy film based in Transylvania.
- 1984: Frankenstein '90, a French film by Alain Jessua, with Jean Rochefort and Eddy Mitchell.
- 1985: The Bride was an adaptation directed by Franc Roddam. It stars Clancy Brown as the Monster, with rocker Sting as Dr. Charles Frankenstein. The plot features the Monster wandering about Europe with a tragic circus midget (David Rappaport) while the doctor himself engages in a Pygmalion-inspired relationship with a female creation, the eponymous Monster's Bride played by Jennifer Beals. A love triangle between the doctor, the Monster, and the Bride provides the film's conflict.
- 1987: The Monster Squad is a comedy/horror film written and directed by Fred Dekker that was released by TriStar Pictures. The film features the reunion of a number of classic movie monsters, led by Count Dracula and including the Frankenstein Monster (Tom Noonan), the Wolf Man, the Mummy, and the Gill-Man.

==== 1990s and 2000s ====
- 1990: Frankenstein Unbound is a science fiction movie based on the novel by Brian Aldiss and the last movie directed by Roger Corman. In it, a scientist (John Hurt) travels back in time to meet Victor Frankenstein (Raúl Juliá) and his Creature, as well as Mary Shelley herself.
- 1992: In Frankenstein, directed and written by David Wickes, the Creature was not pieced together from body parts but a clone (of sorts) of Frankenstein himself, establishing a psychic bond between creator (Patrick Bergin) and Creature (Randy Quaid). A female Creature was nearly created the same way, using Elizabeth (Fiona Gillies) as the model.
- 1994: Mary Shelley's Frankenstein was directed by Kenneth Branagh, who also portrayed Victor Frankenstein. It featured a star cast with Robert De Niro as the Monster, Tom Hulce as Henry, John Cleese as Professor Waldman, Helena Bonham Carter as Elizabeth, and Aidan Quinn as Captain Robert Walton. Despite the title, it still diverged from Mary Shelley's original novel in many ways.
- 2004: Van Helsing. This film is a reinvention of the famous Universal stable of monsters of the 1930s and 1940s. Shuler Hensley plays the Monster who, contrary to usual practice, is directly referred to by the name Frankenstein in the film's publicity, but he is named mostly in the film as "the Monster" or "the Creature". The portrayal of the Creature in this movie as intelligent, articulate, sympathetic, and as a hero who only wants to live, is somewhat close to the portrayal in the book. Physically, he is large and bulky, as opposed to his tall and thin portrayal in the classic films, and bears many physical features of Boris Karloff's portrayal, such as the bolted neck and flat head. He also has a visible brain and heart, which glow green and are protected under glass casings, and a large engine in his left leg. He plays a vital role in the birth of Dracula's numerous offspring through the combination of his "father's" machine that gave him life in the first place and the use of himself as a power source, allowing the numerous stillborn children Dracula has conceived with his brides over the centuries to be brought to life, requiring Van Helsing to kill Dracula himself in order to destroy the vampires' progeny.
- 2004: Frankenstein, a two-episode miniseries that is faithful to the novel.
- 2005: Frankenstein vs. the Creature from Blood Cove. In this film, Frankenstein's Monster is resurrected to fight terrorists along with a half-fish, half-man creature. However, the plan soon goes awry.
- 2006: Perfect Woman. This film, produced by Olympic Productions, is a modern spin on the tale. The plot follows a reality game show that is looking for the perfect woman to win the perfect man, played by Marcus Schenkenberg. Little do the girls know that the game show is a mask for an evil genius who is literally trying to make the perfect woman, using various body parts.
- 2006: Subject Two. This film, written and directed by Philip Chidel, has a modern nanotechnology spin on the tale. The plot follows a disillusioned medical student's journey to a remote snowbound mountain location where he is met by a man named Dr. Vic.
- 2008: In Death Race, the Jason Statham character takes the place of a race car driver who goes by the name Frankenstein; the same character's beginnings are explored in the two direct-to-video prequels, Death Race 2 and Death Race 3: Inferno.

==== 2010s and 2020s ====
- 2010: Mary Shelley's Frankenhole
- 2011: Frankenstein: Day of the Beast is an independent American horror film directed by Ricardo Islas.
- 2011: "Frankenstein's Wedding – Live in Leeds": Broadcast live on BBC Three, this adaptation uses the romance between Victor and Elizabeth as a basis for a music drama portraying the rest of the story and was filmed live on 19 March 2011 at Kirkstall Abbey in Leeds. The drama used popular music, such as "Wires" by Athlete, sung by Andrew Gower, portraying the Scientist, Frankenstein. Other members of the cast included Lacey Turner as Elizabeth "Liz" Lavenza and David Harewood as the Creature.
- 2012: In Hotel Transylvania, Frankenstein's Monster is one of the monsters to go check in at Hotel Transylvania. This film gives him the name Frank, and he is shown as the uncle of Dracula's daughter Mavis. He is voiced by Kevin James. His Bride appears as well and is given the name Eunice in the film. The Bride is voiced by Fran Drescher in the film.
- 2013: Frankenstein's Army is a found-footage horror film about Soviet troops fighting undead mechanical German soldiers during the Second World War.
- 2014: Army of Frankensteins concerns a time-traveling youth who, along with multiple versions of Frankenstein's monster, is pulled into the American Civil War.
- 2014: I, Frankenstein is a more action-based adaptation, which includes Frankenstein's monster, now named Adam, and a centuries-old feud between two immortal races.
- 2015: Victor Frankenstein tells the story from Igor's point of view. The film featured a prototype version of the Monster called "Prometheus" (portrayed by Spencer Wilding and Guillaume Delaunay).
- 2015: Bernard Rose's Frankenstein is a modern-set adaptation of the novel, with an emphasis on portraying elements which have not typically been included in screen adaptations, particularly the Monster's intelligence and organic (as opposed to reanimated) genesis. In the film, Victor Frankenstein and his wife Elizabeth create the Monster by manipulating DNA instead of reviving corpses, and the film unfolds from the Monster's point of view.
- 2019: Depraved is a modern adaptation of the novel written and directed by Larry Fessenden and centering on a soldier suffering from PTSD who creates life in a Brooklyn loft.
- 2025: Frankenstein is an adaptation of the novel written and directed by Guillermo del Toro.

=== Parodies and satires ===
- Between 1921 and 1922, H.P. Lovecraft wrote the serialized "Herbert West, Reanimator" in six parts, as a satirical send-up of Mary Shelley's original novel.
- In the Mighty Mouse's 1942 cartoon Frankenstein's Cat, a community of mice and birds are living and playing peacefully until the arrival of the title character: a mechanical cat who wants to eat everything that comes his way.
- In the 1964 cartoon Dr. Devil and Mr. Hare, a Frankenstein monster robot beats up both the Tasmanian Devil and Bugs Bunny.
- A 1965–1968 cartoon series featured the overly-nice Milton the Monster and "Fangenstein".
- Dr. Frankenstein and Frankenstein's Monster appeared in Mad Monster Party?.
- In a 1968 episode of The Inspector entitled "Transylvania Mania", a smart Dracula-like character and a stupid Frankenstein-like creature try to steal the Inspector's brain to put it in a new creature that the vampire is building.
- The 1968 Beatles movie, Yellow Submarine, featured a scene with the Frankenstein Monster drinking a potion and becoming John Lennon.
- The 1970 cartoon Groovie Goolies featured Frankie, a friendly version of the Monster. Howard Morris did the voice work.
- Franken Berry (1971), the mascot of the General Mills cereal of the same name, is a friendly parody of the Monster (cartoon and movie clip versions of the actual Frankenstein Monster have appeared in some commercials).
- The Mel Brooks and Gene Wilder comedy Young Frankenstein (1974) borrows heavily from the first three Universal Frankenstein films, especially Son of Frankenstein. The production used many of James Whale's original laboratory set pieces and employed the technical contributions of their original creator, Kenneth Strickfaden. Wilder portrays Dr. Frankenstein's American grandson, Frederick, while Peter Boyle plays the Monster. A Turkish remake, Sevimli Frankestayn was released in 1975. Brooks later adapted his film for musical theater. The musical Young Frankenstein opened on Broadway in November 2007.
- The Rocky Horror Picture Show (1975) was a musical parody of the story. In this twisted comedic tale, Dr. Frank N. Furter creates a creature for his own pleasure (named 'Rocky') and finds that his creature has heterosexual lusts as well.
- In the 1976 live action Saturday morning show, Monster Squad, three monster statues from a wax museum come to life to fight crime, Dracula, Bruce W. Wolf (a werewolf), and Frank N. Stein (Frankenstein's Monster). The monster was portrayed by Michael Lane
- The 1982 young adult novel Frank and Stein and Me by Kin Platt has the protagonist meet the strange Dr. Stein and his hulking creature Frank while on the run from smugglers. In the novel Frank is described as an accident victim that Dr Stein has saved from death and rebuilt. The book features a running joke with Stein being confused by references to Frankenstein, being unfamiliar with the story.
- The 1984 live-action science fiction comedy film Frankenweenie directed by Tim Burton follows a young boy named Victor Frankenstein who brings his dog, Sparky, back to life after being killed by a car through the use of lightening.
- The 1985 teen comedy Weird Science stars two high school students, who are inspired by the original Universal film to create through a Memotech MTX512 home computer a virtual idealistic girlfriend, but the situation degennperates when they, hacking into a government mainframe for more power and engaging in a weird ritual, end up creating an actual girl. The film and the music video for the theme and the song of the same name by Oingo Boingo features a clip of the "It's Alive!" scene and frontman Danny Elfman doing an impression of Dr. Frankenstein in the music video.
- Return of the Killer Tomatoes (1988) includes a scene in which the lead character is watching a movie called Frankenstein's Mummy (as a spoof of the 1940s sequel titles) on nighttime television. Return also features a character named Igor who parodies the "hunchbacked assistant" cliche upon his first appearance in the film.
- Frankenhooker (1990) is a parody of the Universal films in which Jeffrey Franken gathers body parts from various streetwalkers in order to build the "perfect" woman. This same concept was borrowed for 2006's Perfect Woman (mentioned above).
- Frank Enstein (1992) is a direct-to-video children's film about a robot named "Frank Enstein" who goes on an adventure.
- The 1995 Disney Mickey Mouse short Runaway Brain features Mickey going to the nefarious Dr. Frankenollie (voiced by Kelsey Grammer) and having his brain switched with a Pete-resembling Frankenstein monster named Julius (voiced by Jim Cummings).
- Frankenstein's monster appears in the 1999 film Alvin and the Chipmunks Meet Frankenstein where his vocal effects are provided by Frank Welker.
- A 2001 short film called Frankenthumb, directed by Steve Oedekerk, a parody of the 1931 film told with thumbs with superimposed faces and elaborate miniature sets.
- The 2012 stop-motion animated film remake by the same title Frankenweenie directed by Tim Burton, shares similarities in plot to the original 1984 film, but in this newer version, Victor Frankenstein teaches his peers how to resurrect their deceased pets.
- The Addams Family (2019) features a scene where Wednesday brings the dead frogs in science class back to life a la Dr. Frankenstein in a parody of the 1931 film.

== Television derivatives ==
The Frankenstein story and its elements have been adapted many times for television:

- The anthology series Tales of Tomorrow (1951–53) featured a half-hour adaptation starring Lon Chaney Jr. as an atomically animated monster.
- A 1959 Hammer Film Productions half-hour pilot episode called Tales of Frankenstein. Anton Diffring played the Baron, and Don Megowan his creation. Curt Siodmak directed.
- The "Moosylvania" episode of Rocky and His Friends showed Boris and Natasha attempting to pass off some small Western town as Washington, D.C.—and the Capitol Building is topped off with a statue of Frankenstein's Monster.
- Boris Karloff reprised his role wearing the Frankenstein Monster makeup in a 1962 episode of Route 66 titled "Lizard's Leg and Owlet's Wing" for Halloween. Also appearing in the episode were Lon Chaney Jr. as both the Wolf Man and the Mummy, and Peter Lorre.
- Universal produced a television sitcom from 1964 to 1966 for CBS entitled The Munsters with Fred Gwynne as Herman Munster, a character physically resembling Universal's cinematic depiction of Frankenstein's Monster, who was the patriarch of a family of kindly monsters. The rest of the family included a grandfather resembling the Universal Dracula (who may actually be Dracula), a wife that resembles one of the Brides of Dracula, and a werewolf son. The Munsters' house at 1313 Mockingbird Lane can still be seen on the Universal Studios' backlot tour at Universal Studios in Universal City, California.
- In the 1960s series The Addams Family, the family butler was Lurch, who looked and behaved very much like the Creature. Asked about his father in an episode of The Addams Family (1992 TV series), Lurch smiled and replied, "He put me together!" His vocabulary was limited, much like Boris Karloff's creature, but he became iconic for the catchphrases, "You rang?" and "Follow me."
- The 1965 Doctor Who serial The Chase features a sequence set in what appears to be a mysterious old house where various horror film monsters, including Frankenstein's Monster, menace first the Doctor and his companions and later the Daleks. The house is subsequently revealed to be a Haunted House exhibit at an event entitled the "Festival of Ghana, 1996"
  - A 1971 Doctor Who serial, Terror of the Autons features companion Jo Grant, upon learning from the Doctor that the Autons "make bodies" for themselves, enquiring if this is "like Frankenstein?"
  - A 1976 Doctor Who serial, The Brain of Morbius, has a Time Lord criminal brought back to life by a mad scientist, using the Time Lord's brain and a body composed of various alien races who had crashed onto the planet where Morbius' brain had been stored since his defeat.
  - The regeneration sequence of the seventh Doctor, Sylvester McCoy, into the eighth incarnation, Paul McGann, in the 1996 TV movie Doctor Who is set in a hospital morgue. The night attendant at the morgue is watching the 1931 Frankenstein in the next room, and scenes in which the monster is brought to life are intercut with images of the Doctor's "resurrection", his appearance out of the storage room then causing the attendant to pass out.
- In The Famous Adventures of Mr. Magoo episode "Doctor Frankenstein", the titular nearsighted Mr. Magoo plays the mad scientist Victor.
- Milton the Monster (1965–67) was a cartoon character developed shortly after The Munsters about a kind-hearted Frankenstein monster who famously "flipped his lid" (emitted steam out of the top of his head like a whale's blowhole) when angered, and who was constantly nearly kicked out of the lab by his scheming creator, Professor Weirdo.
- In the 1966 animated series Frankenstein Jr. and The Impossibles, a boy scientist Buzz Conroy and his father Professor Conroy fight supervillains with the aid of a powerful heroic robot named "Frankenstein Jr." who is like a mix between "Gigantor" and Frankenstein's Monster.
- The Gothic drama Dark Shadows featured a plotline running from April 1968 until December 1968 in which an artificial man named Adam is stitched together from corpses and reanimated using the life force of vampire Barnabas Collins.
- The 1968 Thames series Mystery and Imagination featured an adaptation starring Ian Holm as both Frankenstein and his creation.
- The 1970-71 Saturday morning cartoon series Groovie Goolies was a parody of both the Universal monsters and Rowan and Martin's Laugh-In. The leads were the Monster Trio of Drac, Wolfie, and Frankie, a friendly version of the Monster. Howard Morris did Frankie's voice.
- The 1971 Canadian series The Hilarious House of Frightenstein included a failed Frankenstein's-monster-like creation named Brucie who needed to be revived by Count Frightenstein in order to return from exile to Transylvania.
- Frankenstein's Monster was one of the monster trio from various skits on The Electric Company, portrayed by Skip Hinnant.
- Dan Curtis' 1973 adaptation had Robert Foxworth as Frankenstein and Bo Svenson as the Creature.
- A 1973 Universal production, Frankenstein: The True Story, was more an amalgamation of various concepts from previous films than a direct adaptation of the novel. It starred Leonard Whiting as Frankenstein and Michael Sarrazin as the Creature, with a star supporting cast including James Mason, David McCallum, John Gielgud, Ralph Richardson, Agnes Moorehead and Jane Seymour.
- Baron Henry von Frankenstein and Frankenstein's monster appear in the 1973 TV film Mad Mad Mad Monsters and Alvin and the Chipmunks Meet Frankenstein
- "Dr. What's-his-name", an episode of the 1975 live action series The Ghost Busters, features a long-suffering Doctor Frankenstein whose goal is to make his gigantic, childlike Creature more obedient with the brain of "the world's most gullible fool". Spenser (Larry Storch), of course, is the world's most gullible fool...
- In the 1976 live-action Saturday morning show Monster Squad, three monster statues from a wax museum come to life to fight crime, Dracula, Bruce W. Wolf (a werewolf), and Frank N. Stein (Frankenstein's Monster). The monster was portrayed by Michael Lane.
- In an episode of Fantasy Island, Dr. Carla Frankenstein (portrayed by Lynda Day George), a descendant of Dr. Frankenstein, visits the island to try to find out about her ancestor. A being (portrayed by William Smith) created by the elder scientist appears and Anne is determined to take the being with her naively believing that it will be treated with proper care in the 1980s.
- CBS Television aired a 1979 series starring Jack Elam as Frank (the Monster) and Jeffrey Kramer as Ted Stein, a descendant of Dr. Frankenstein, called Struck by Lightning.
- An animated segment on Sesame Street showed a mad doctor bringing to life a Frankenstein Monster-like creature that was actually a capital letter H.
- In an episode of The World's Greatest Super Friends titled "The Super Friends Meet Frankenstein", the Super Friends battle the great-great-grandson of Dr. Victor Frankenstein and three of his monsters: a version of Frankenstein's monster, a tentacled tar monster with Kryptonite in it, and a hybrid monster with all of the powers of Superman, Wonder Woman, and Batman.
- The 1980s cartoon Drak Pack featured Frankie, a descendant of the Monster who could assume his form as a superhero guise.
- One of Arale's classmates in Dr. Slump was named Monsuta (a.k.a. Frank).
- A 1984 Yorkshire Television version starring Robert Powell as Victor, David Warner as his Creature, and Carrie Fisher as the doomed Elizabeth.
- In 1986, the BBC television documentary series Everyman broadcast The True Story of Frankenstein, directed by Alan Lewens, dramatizing several scenes of Mary Shelley's novel with Christopher Guard as Victor Frankenstein and Clive Russell as The Creature.
- An episode of The Catillac Cats has Riff Raff as a mad scientist about to be beaten up by the Mungo version of Frankenstein's Monster.
- In Dragonball, young Goku befriends a cyborg named Number 8 (whom he nicknames Ha-chan) who was similar in appearance to Frankenstein's Monster.
- In the original Transformers episode "Autobot Spike", Sparkplug Witwicky creates an Autobot using mismatched robot parts that he names Autobot X (voiced by Corey Burton, vocal effects provided by Don Messick). The parts of Autobot X are duplicate parts of the other Autobots. The robot is a mindless monster and goes berserk. Later, Spike Witwicky is injured and his consciousness is transferred to the giant robot body. Spike makes several direct references to the invention as a "robot Frankenstein Monster". A film of Frankenstein was also shown in that episode with Dr. Frankenstein voiced by Frank Welker, his hunchback assistant voiced by Michael Bell, and Frankenstein's monster voiced by Peter Cullen.
- In The Comic Strip segment "The Mini-Monsters", he has a son named Franky who attends Camp Mini-Mon.
- In the Scooby-Doo television movie Scooby-Doo and the Ghoul School, Scooby, Shaggy and Scrappy-Doo meet the daughters of several monsters at "Miss Grimwood's School for Girls". One of the 'girl ghouls' (as they are called in the movie) is named Elsa Frankenteen, her father being Frankenteen Sr. Frankenteen Sr. is the best representation of Boris Karloff's creature, with his daughter more closely resembling Elsa Lanchester's interpretation of the Bride of Frankenstein. "Frankenteen" is also a portmanteau of "Frankenstein" and "teen" because Elsa is a teenager.
- The New Adventures of Winnie the Pooh episode "Frankenpooh" is a parody in which Pooh is the Monster and Piglet is the scientist who made him.
- Frankenstein's Monster appeared in the 1988 film Scooby-Doo and the Reluctant Werewolf, voiced by Jim Cummings.
- As played by Phil Hartman, the Monster was also a popular recurring comedic character on Saturday Night Live in the early 1990s, often delivering the line, "Fire bad!"
- In The Super Mario Bros. Super Show! episode "Koopenstein", Bowser (under the guise of Dr. Koopenstein) plans to use Mario and Luigi's brains for a robotic Koopa Troopa he has made, but through the result of a horrific accident, he mutates into a Frankenstein's Monster-esque version of himself and proceeds to rampage through a nearby village. A live action segment from another episode, titled "The Mario Monster Mash", features Mario and Luigi meeting Dr. Frankenstein (played by Eugene Liebowitz) and his Monster, where a laboratory mishap causes Mario's brain to be switched with the Monster's.
- In a 15-minute episode of Sonic the Hedgehog, Rotor the Walrus, assisted by Antoine, creates a robot named Ro-Becca. Antoine accidentally activates Ro-Becca and she falls in love with him.
- The 1995 Fox "Tiny Toon Adventures" special Tiny Toons' Night Ghoulery offers about a dozen shorts introduced in the style of the 1970s program Night Gallery, with Babs Bunny stepping in for Rod Serling. One of the segments, "Frankenmyra & Dizzigor", is a parody of Frankenstein.
- An episode of Darkwing Duck had a spoof called "Steerminator" in which dead supervillain Taurus Bulba is rebuilt into a cyborg.
- A 1992 production for the American TNT cable network, with Patrick Bergin as Victor and Randy Quaid as his hapless creation.
- There were instances where the concept of Frankenstein's Monster was used in the Super Sentai and Power Rangers series:
  - In Kyōryū Sentai Zyuranger, the monster Dora Franke was an obvious nod to the Monster and has two other forms known as Zombie Franke and Satan Franke. His Mighty Morphin Power Rangers counterpart was simply referred to as the "Frankenstein Monster" while his Zombie Franke and Satan Franke forms were depicted as a separate monster named Mutitus.
  - In Mahou Sentai Magiranger, one of the main villains named Victory General Branken was inspired by Frankenstein's monster. His Power Rangers: Mystic Force counterpart was Morticon.
  - In Shuriken Sentai Ninninger, the Western Yokai Franken was a Frankenstein's monster/flashlight monster. In Power Rangers Ninja Steel, he was adapted as Deceptron.
- An episode of Goof Troop had a spoof called "Frankengoof". Despite the title, the monster is a mirror image of Pete with Goofy being the descendant of Dr. Frankengoof.
- In the 1994 animated series Monster Force, Frankenstein's Monster, alias "Frankenstein" or "the Monster", becomes humanity's ally in a desperate fight against evil Creatures of the Night.
- The comedy series called Weird Science (1994–98) was inspired by the Frankenstein storyline (just as the 1985 film of the same name was). The series follows the adventures of two high school students who design their "perfect" woman simulation by filling their computer with various forms of data and images, which is accidentally turned into life after a freak lightning storm.* "Frankenbone", a 1995 episode of the PBS children's series Wishbone, had an adaptation of Shelley's novel that stayed true to the original story with the canine star in the role of Victor and Matthew Tompkins as the Monster.
- The Animaniacs episode "Phranken-Runt", featuring Rita and Runt, parodied both the overall Frankenstein plot and elements of The Rocky Horror Picture Show.
- The children's animated series Arthur has an episode depicting a reenactment of the night the novel was created. Titled Fernkenstein's Monster, it was described as: "Inspired by Mary Shelley's Frankenstein, Fern tells a tale so scary that Arthur and the gang become afraid of her. Can Fern prove her skills as a writer and create a different story that's fun instead of frightening?"
- The 1996-98 Fox Kids series Big Bad Beetleborgs (later Beetleborgs Metallix) featured a "hulking stitched-up" character named Frankenbeans (performed by David Fletcher), "brought to life" by Baron von Frankenbeans. The zany character owes a great debt to Herman Munster and Peter Boyle in Young Frankenstein. Strangely, the character is celebrated every year on the Thursday before the last Friday of October on a day called Frankenbeans Thursday. The episode "Bride of Frankenbeans" had Dr. Frankenbeans making a mate for Frankenbeans. Despite the wedding crasher Crimson Creep being defeated, Frankenbeans' relationship with the Bride of Frankenbeans did not work out causing Dr. Frankenbeans to deactivate and dismantle her. In "Son of Frankenbeans", Baron Frankenbeans made a "little brother" for Frankenbeans.
- In the Histeria! episode "Super Writers", at the end of a sketch about Edgar Allan Poe publishing "The Raven", Mary Shelley appears (portrayed by Charity Bazaar dressed as the Bride of Frankenstein) to pitch the book to Sammy Melman.
- Buffy the Vampire Slayer has also faced "Frankensteinian" creations. In the season 2 episode "Some Assembly Required, the creation was Darryl Epps, a reanimated high school jock whose brother reanimated him after an accident, but after his brother refused to complete a project to create a bride for him as the rapid decay rate of brain tissue would have required him to actually kill someone, Darryl allowed himself to die in a fire rather than have to live alone. The season 4 Big Bad was Adam, a conglomeration of robot, human, and demon parts created by a government scientist in charge of a demon research facility who rebelled against his creator, whom he referred to as 'Mother', mirroring the statements of the Creature, who believed that Frankenstein should have been a better father, and tried to create a new society of creatures like him before he was destroyed.
- A season five episode of The X-Files titled "The Post-Modern Prometheus" retold the Frankenstein legend updated with genetic-engineering technology. The episode, the only one of the series filmed exclusively in black and white, was inspired by the film adaptations of the legend. The creature (portrayed by Chris Owens) known as the Great Mutato was depicted with two-faces and reptilian-like hands. He shunned by his mad scientist creator Dr. Francis Pollidori and seeks a mate in a small town.
- The character of Rampage in the Beast Wars: Transformers series has a great many similarities to Frankenstein's Monster, especially his origins as a product of science gone horribly wrong; the main differences are his status as an irredeemable psychopath and that his body was not created by piecing others together. In a later episode, Megatron's cloning of Dinobot bears a strong resemblance to the creation of the Monster.
- The 2000 anime television series Argento Soma draws a large amount of inspiration from Frankenstein. The series' plotline revolves around an ambitious scientist assembling a giant silver creature from scattered components. The giant (aptly nicknamed "Frank") possesses a tender and compassionate nature but has a bizarre and hideous exterior and the potential to inflict death and destruction.
- In The Simpsons had some Treehouse of Horror stories inspired by Frankenstein starting in 2003:
  - In Treehouse of Horror XIV, there is a segment entitled "Frinkenstein", whereby Professor Frink uses his universal multi-tool to resurrect his dead father, who then goes on a rampage stealing organs from others until his son is forced to kill him.
  - In Treehouse of Horror XVIII, Bart wears a costume resembling the Monster. In Treehouse of Horror XX, he appears as one of the monsters at Homer and Marge's Halloween party wearing modern costumes after being teased by Jimbo, Kearney and Dolph.
  - In Treehouse of Horror XXI as the monster Frink created in his lab. Also in Treehouse of Horror III, Lewis is wearing a Halloween costume of the Monster at the Halloween party with Bart and Lisa.
- Nightmare! The Birth of Horror (U.S. title: Nightmare! The Birth of Victorian Horror) was a BBC miniseries with Professor Christopher Frayling. There were four episodes on classic horror tales: Dracula, Frankenstein, Dr. Jekyll and Mr. Hyde, and The Hound of the Baskervilles. Each episode began on looking at the author's nightmares or encounters with the nightmarish and how it inspired their novel.
- An episode of SpongeBob SquarePants called "Frankendoodle" involves SpongeBob using a human artist's "magic pencil" to create a living, evil doodle of himself.
- In the Halloween special of The Adventures of Jimmy Neutron: Boy Genius, Jimmy's invention, the Neutronic Monster Maker, features Frankenstein's monster as one of the choices. Jimmy's father, Hugh, undergoes such mutation turning him into a Frankenstein's Monster-like being after mistaking the machine for a game he calls "Name that Monster".
- The Duck Dodgers episode "Castle High" revolved around the main character explaining to I.Q. High what had happened to his castle; a flashback reveals that he created versions of the Monster and the Monstress.
- A 2004 production titled Frankenstein for the American USA Network starred Thomas Kretschmann as Victor and Vincent Pérez as his original creature, named "Deucalion" (because he was the "son" of the "Modern Prometheus". It was not a direct adaptation but a postmodern Gothic reinvention set in present-day New Orleans.
- The Monster was a recurring character on Late Night with Conan O'Brien (played by Brian Stack), mainly in the segment "Frankenstein Wastes a Minute of Our Time" and as a Jewish character.
- The Cartoon Network series Robot Chicken featured a Frankenstein parody character called "Frank Enstein".
- In the Ben 10 franchise, Transylians are a race of electrokinetic aliens from Anur Transyl that resemble Frankenstein's monster. Frankenstrike (formerly known as Benvicktor) is their representative transformation in the Omnitrix.
- In the series Kamen Rider Kiva, Dogga's race, the Franken, is an obvious nod to the Monster, along with Kiva's Dogga form.
- In an episode of Time Warp Trio entitled "Nightmare on Joe's Street", Mary Shelley accidentally draws her first impression of the Monster in The Book, causing her dream to become a reality. Unlike typical versions of the Creature, which have one-colored complexions, this render of the Monster is seen with patchwork-colored skin, signifying his construction from various corpse parts.
- Two segments from Braingames showed Frankenstein's monster. One was "Splatnarnt", in which two scientists assembling a Frankenstein's-monster-like creature using interior body parts whose names were scrambled; the idea was for the viewer to unscramble the names. The other was "Whosamawhatchamacallits", in which Frankenstein's Monster was the last character portrayed in the game.
- An ITV modern adaptation simply titled Frankenstein was aired on 24 October 2007, where a mother uses lab equipment to try to create a "body of organs" for her dying eight-year-old son.
- The fifth-season episode of Highlander: The Series titled "The Modern Prometheus" has Mary Shelley draw her inspiration from two immortals battling during the long winter in the Swiss Alps. Upon seeing Byron (in the series secretly an Immortal) restored to life by lightning, she asks Methos why her child rots in her grave while Byron simply gets up and walks away. Methos admonishes her to pity their kind, for life can go on when it should not. The isolation he describes enables Shelley to write her classic.
- In the Star Trek: The Next Generation episode "Thine Own Self", android Lt. Commander Data suffers amnesia as a result of a power surge and is misunderstood as a monster by natives of a primitive society.
- Two animated segments from Sesame Street teaching basic geography were hosted by Dr. Geo and his Frankenstein-like unnamed assistant who would mimic everything Geo said behind his back. One segment talked about the concept of a globe and the other about mountains.
- In a season 3 episode of the NBC television series Chuck, Chuck refers to John Casey as "Trank-enstein", due to the NSA colonel's love of weaponry (in this case, tranquilizer darts) and typical brutish mannerisms.
- In the Adult Swim animated series Minoriteam, the title characters frequently fought an opponent named Racist Frankenstein who has the mind of a racist and the body of a monster.
- Frankenstein's Monster and the Bride of Frankenstein's Monster are the father and mother of Frankie Stein in Monster High.
- Frankenstein's Wedding was a live television adaptation broadcast on BBC Three on 19 March 2011.
- 2009: Wizards of Waverly Place, episode 1 season 3 "Franken Girl", Justin's monster.
- In The Venture Bros. episode "¡Viva los Muertos!", Dr. Venture reanimates the corpse of a Monarch henchman killed by Brock Samson, naming the creature "Venturestein".
- In the television series Once Upon a Time, David Anders plays the mysterious Dr. Whale who is revealed to be the "real life" counterpart of Dr. Victor Frankenstein in season 2.
- The season seven Criminal Minds episode "There's No Place Like Home" deals with the serial killer Travis James (portrayed by Alex Weed) who murders young men and removes their body parts in an attempt to build a new body for his deceased brother Tucker. When confronted by the BAU and the police, Travis commits suicide by allowing himself, his creation, and his mobile home to be sucked up by an approaching tornado.
- In the anime/manga Soul Eater, Professor Frank N. Stein is a teacher and meister at the DWMA (Death Weapon Meister Academy).
- In 2014, PBS and Pemberley Digital created a webseries based on the original novel, called Frankenstein, M.D.; the series brings the story to modern days, following the medical student who subsequently becomes Doctor Victoria Frankenstein.
- In the Supernatural season 10 episode "Dark Dynasty", Eldon Styne reveals that his family, the Styne Family and the main enemies of Book of the Damned, Dark Dynasty and The Prisoner are in actuality members of the House of Frankenstein, one of the oldest families in Europe.
- Victor Frankenstein, the Creature, and the Bride are major characters in the Showtime series Penny Dreadful. Scholar Ann Larabee identifies the show as being involved in the cultural phenomenon she calls "Frankenforms" which are modern reinterpretations of Mary Shelley's novel.
- In the television series Grimm, the sixth season episode "The Son Also Rises" features a group of scientists attempting to bring the son of one of their number back to life in a Frankenstein-esque experiment, but their work goes wrong when the reanimated body was created using the body parts taken from dead wesen, causing an extreme reaction that provokes the scientists to try and kill him, prompting the boy to go after them in revenge.
- In the first episode of the animated television series VeggieTales, "Where's God When I'm S-Scared?", the plot of the first story revolves around Junior Asparagus's fear of an in-universe version of Frankenstein's Monster called "Frankencelery."
- The Halloween episode of Animaniacs had a segment parodying Frankenstein called "Bride of Pinky", in which Dr. Brainenstein builds a female monster in a plan to take over his village, only for Pee-Gor to fall in love with her.
- Phineas and Ferb had a Frankenstein parody in "The Monster of Phineas-and-Ferbenstein" in which the boys' ancestors build a giant monster version of Perry. Also, the episodes "One Good Scare Ought to Do It!" and "That's the Spirit!" both feature Ferb dressed as Frankenstein's Monster, with Phineas dressed as Dr. Frankenstein in the former.
- In the Mickey Mouse Halloween special "The Scariest Story Ever!", the first story Mickey tries to scare his and Donald's nephews with is a parody of Frankenstein, with Goofy, Donald and Mickey as Dr. Goofenstein, Duckor and the Monster, respectively.
- Both of the TV shows Mister Magoo and The Famous Adventures of Mr. Magoo had adaptations of Frankenstein.
- In the Cloudy with a Chance of Meatballs, there is an episode called "Flintenstein" when Flint Lockwood and the class watch the original Frankenstein movie. However, Flint is disappointed as he considers it to be "Hollywood science", as Flint believes that Dr. Victor Frankenstein in the movie does not behave the way normal scientists would and says he makes other inventors look bad. However, to prove it is actual science, he just grabs whatever junk he can find in the lab and then Flint's creation comes to life after the lab is struck by a lightning bolt. However, Flint's monster is really kind and friendly and calls him "Daddy", despite Flint trying his best to prove that this monster is not his son. After hanging out though, Flint feels close to his creation until the citizens of Swallow Falls form a mob and try to get rid of him. By the end, however, Flint has to transport his creation into another universe with a portal machine and finds a lover.
- Both versions of Wacky Races have a parody of the Monster as half of the Gruesome Twosome.

== Other derivatives ==
=== Music ===
- The 1962 novelty song "Monster Mash" is narrated by a Dr. Frankenstein-like character, who talks about his Monster learning a new dance.
- American rock band New York Dolls included a song "Frankenstein" on their 1973 self-titled debut album in which they invited the listener to imagine having sex with the Monster.
- "Frankenstein" is a 1973 instrumental by the Edgar Winter Group - so named because it was constructed from bits and pieces of several different takes.
- The video for Yazoo's song "Don't Go" featured a Frankenstein theme.
- In the video for her 1983 song "Telephone (Long Distance Love Affair)", Sheena Easton is pursued through a haunted house by Frankenstein's Monster.
- In The Dead Milkmen video "Big Time Operator" lead singer Rodney is depicted as FrankenElvis.
- For their 1987 single, "Doin' It All for My Baby", Huey Lewis and the News used a Frankenstein theme in a video performance.
- The lyrics of T'Pau's 1987 song "China in Your Hand" reference Frankenstein.
- "Frankenstein" is a song by funk metal band Clutch from Pure Rock Fury.
- "Dr. Stein", a song produced by the power metal band Helloween for their 1988 album Keeper of the Seven Keys, Pt. 2, is based on Victor Frankenstein and his Monster.
- Rock musician Alice Cooper recorded a song titled "Teenage Frankenstein" for his 1986 album Constrictor, and recorded "Feed My Frankenstein" for his 1991 album Hey Stoopid. The latter song was also featured in the 1992 film Wayne's World.
- Electric Frankenstein is an American punk rock band from New Jersey.
- Frankenstein Drag Queens From Planet 13, a horror punk band formed in North Carolina in 1996.
- Frankenstein Girls Will Seem Strangely Sexy is the title of a 2000 album by the band Mindless Self Indulgence.
- "Frankenstein" is a song by American metal band Iced Earth from their 2001 album Horror Show, which features songs themed after classic movie monsters.
- "Some Kind of Monster" is a 2004 song by Metallica which uses themes from Frankenstein.
- "Jesse James meets Frankenstein's Daughter" is a song by American Folk musician Space Mandino.
- The Rammstein song "Mutter" is about a monster that kills its creator or mom in this case.
- The musical The Rocky Horror Picture Show includes a song called "There's A Light (Over At The Frankenstein Place)"
- The Abby Travis music video for her 2011 single Lightning Squared is a cartoon parody of the Frankenstein story, with the Monster and his Bride as doomed lovers forever on the run from an angry mob.
- The punk band Crass referenced Frankenstein in the song "Reject of Society".
- Dr. Frankenstein a concept album/rock opera written by Cuban/Mexican musician José Fors, was based on both the original novel and James Whale's films. It was released in 2009.
- East Bay hardcore punk band The Nerve Agents included a song called "Planet Frankenstein" on a split EP they released in collaboration with New York hardcore punk band Kill Your Idols in 2000.
- Toy Love released a 1980 single, "Bride of Frankenstein".
- The German band Oomph!'s song "Brennende Liebe" details a sort of Frankenstein scenario, and the video features Frankenstein, his wife, and the scientist and his associates.
- The rock band Glass Wave included a song about Frankenstein's Monster (entitled "Creature") on their 2010 album. The lyrics are sung through the Creature's voice.
- Kevin Max's song "Jumpstart Your Electric Heart", from his 2005 album The Imposter is a modern-day retelling of Shelley's Frankenstein.
- Underworld's music used in the 2011 play Frankenstein was released on CD by Underworldlive.com.
- Pop singer Chisu released a single titled "Frankenstein" in 2012 with Finnish lyrics. It was also used as the theme song for a dark comedy TV series in Finland, Helsingin herra, in 2012.
- Bob Dylan's 2020 song "My Own Version of You", featuring a narrator who wants to "bring someone to life" using the body parts of disparate corpses, was inspired by Shelley's novel and makes several explicit references to it in the lyrics.
- In their song "Maniac" from the EP Oddinary (2022), Stray Kids encourages listeners to embrace the odd sides in themselves and show how maniac they can be using the metaphor of Frankenstein. They included the Frankenstein reference in their lyrics, choreography, and promotional photos.
- In Swedish House Mafia and ASAP Rocky's "Frankenstein" from Paradise Again, ASAP Rocky compares himself and frequent collaborator Tyler, the Creator to Victor Frankenstein and Igor, respectively, the latter of whom has an album called Igor which refers to the character's archetype.
- The 2024 CIAO MALZ song "Bad for the Bad Guy" contains references to Frankenstein and Mary Shelley.

=== Audio ===
- On August 3, 1931, Alonzo Dean Cole adapted the novel as a 30-minute episode of his program The Witch's Tale. It was redone on March 7, 1932 and July 17, 1935.
- In 1932, George Edwards produced a 13-part, 3-hour series for radio. It follows the structure and spirit of the novel closely.
- On January 8, 1944 it was adapted as a 30-minute drama on the syndicated program The Weird Circle.
- On December 13, 1947 it was adapted as a 30-minute drama on the program Favorite Story.
- In 1952, an adaptation was broadcast on NBC Presents: Short Story.
- A 30-minute drama version was broadcast on Suspense on November 3, 1952 starring Herbert Marshall and again on June 7, 1955 starring Stacy Harris.
- In 1994, BBC Radio 4 broadcast a two-part adaptation written by Nick Stafford and directed by Claire Grove, with Michael Maloney as Frankenstein and John Wood as the Creature.
- In 1999, the Radio Tales drama series presented an adaptation of Mary Shelley's novel for National Public Radio.
- In 2012, BBC Radio 4 broadcast a two-part adaptation as part of their Gothic Imagination series written by Lucy Catherine and directed by Marc Beeby, with Jamie Parker as Frankenstein, Shaun Dooley as the Monster and Susie Riddell as Elizabeth.
- In 2014, Big Finish Productions released an audio version by Jonathan Barnes directed by Scott Handcock starring Arthur Darvill as Victor Frankenstein, Nicholas Briggs as Waldman/the Creature, Geoffrey Beevers as Alphonse Frankenstein/DeLacey, Georgia Tennant as Elizabeth and Terry Molloy.

Parodies have been broadcast on radio:

- On January 12, 1945 Boris Karloff guest-starred on Duffy's Tavern and appeared in a parody of Frankenstein.
- On January 27, 1957 The Goon Show broadcast The Curse of Frankenstein (which actually had nothing to do with the Frankenstein story except for the title).
- On March 10, 1968 the BBC Radio comedy series Round the Horne broadcast as part of its "Movies Gone Wrong" segment "Frankenstein's Monster".
- On August 7, 2008, in the Bleak Expectations episode "A Happy Life, Cruelly Re-Kippered", the antagonist Gently Benevolent is brought back to life using electricity by the mad scientist Francis Norman 'Frank N.' Sternbeater, one of many of Benevolent's step-siblings who serve as his evil accomplices.
- On November 20, 2014, in Series 4 Episode 6 of the BBC Radio comedy series John Finnemore's Souvenir Programme, when Finnemore's storyteller character is invited to Castle Krupenstein for a scientific demonstration, he is greeted by a slow, groaning character (voiced by Simon Kane) who he believes is 'Krupenstein's monster', but who is in fact her husband. Dr. Gretchen Krupenstein is revealed to have invented a time machine, not a means of reanimation.

=== Stage ===
- Presumption; or, the Fate of Frankenstein, written by Richard Brinsley Peake, was produced at the English Opera House in London in 1823.
- Frankenstein, or The Vampire's Victim is an 1887 musical burlesque composed by Meyer Lutz and written by Richard Henry.
- Frankenstein is an experimental theatre play created by The Living Theater, a company founded in 1947 and originally based in New York, but mainly touring in Europe in the late 1960s.
- Frankenstein: The Man Who Became God (1974), by Alden Nowlan and Walter Learning.
- A Broadway adaptation of the story by Victor Gialanella played for one performance on January 4, 1981 (after 29 previews) and was considered the most expensive non-musical flop ever produced to that date, losing $2 million. However, The New York Times' writer Carol Lawson observed that "critics have remarked that Mr. (Bran) Ferren's work on this play (the special effects and sound designer), which included the spectacular destruction of Dr. Frankenstein's laboratory by his Monster, had the lavishness that audiences have come to expect in films, but have never before seen in the theater." It is noteworthy for John Carradine's playing the part of the blind "DeLacey". Also starring were David Dukes as "Victor Frankenstein", Dianne Wiest as "Elizabeth", John Glover as "Henry Clervel", and Keith Joachim as "the Creature".
- The Guthrie Theater in Minneapolis commissioned Barbara Field to write a response/adaptation to Shelley's novel. The play, called "Frankenstein - Playing with Fire," went on a national tour in early 1988 before playing at the Guthrie during the summer of 1988. The Guthrie restaged the play in September–October 2018.
- Catalyst Theatre's musical adaptation premiered in 2007 in Edmonton and had subsequent productions in Banff (Eric Harvie Theatre), Vancouver (The Cultch), Saskatoon (Persephone Theatre), Calgary (Theatre Calgary/High Performance Rodeo), Whitehorse (Yukon Arts Centre), and Toronto (Canadian Stage). Book, music and lyrics by Jonathan Christenson, from the original novel.
- Joined At The Heart is a musical with music and lyrics by Graham Brown and Geoff Meads, book by Frances Anne Bartam and directed by Frances Brownlie. It tells the love story of Victor Frankenstein and his step-sister Elizabeth, a young orphan girl taken in by Victor's parents and cared for as if she were their own daughter. When Victor's mother dies, he vows to end the suffering that death brings by pursuing eternal life. Joined At The Heart reached the final of the Worldwide Search for Musicals competition. The show was produced at The Junction 2 in Cambridge, UK from 1–4 August 2007 and at the Edinburgh Fringe in Scotland from 12–18 August 2007.
- Young Frankenstein, a musical theatre adaptation of Mel Brooks' Young Frankenstein, opened in November 2007 and closed in January 2009.
- Frankenstein - A New Musical, a pop-opera adaptation which adhered closely to the original novel, opened at 37 Arts Theatre, New York, in autumn 2007 and closed in December 2007. The first UK performance was at The Stables Theatre Hastings in May 2009. Music was by Mark Baron, book by Jefferey Jackson and Gary P. Cohen.
- Frankenstein, a 2008 Brechtian play written by Lally Katz for Sydney Theatre Company. The original production starred Yael Stone as a gender-flipped Creature and Ben Winspear as Frankenstein. In 2017, Melbourne based company Theatre Works presented their staging of the play featuring Michael McStay as Frankenstein and Chantelle Jamieson as The Creature.
- A performance storytelling production of Frankenstein is currently touring both in the UK and internationally. It is performed by storyteller Ben Haggarty and the composer, singer and musician Sianed Jones.
- Frankenstein, a play adapted by Nick Dear from the original novel, premiered at the Royal National Theatre in 2011. This production originally starred Benedict Cumberbatch and Jonny Lee Miller alternating in the roles of Victor Frankenstein and the Creature. A recording of the performance was broadcast live in cinemas worldwide in March 2011. It was later produced in the Sydney Opera House and the Denver Center for the Performing Arts.
- A Korean musical adaptation of the book, written and directed by Wang Yong-beom and songs by Lee Seong-joon, premiered on March 11, 2014. The show achieved unprecedented level of success for an original domestic production, and it has since been produced in Japan and China as well. Each country's top stars, such as Park Eun Tae and Akinori Nakagawa have been in it.
- The Royal Ballet's production of Frankenstein in collaboration with San Francisco Ballet was produced and choreographed by Liam Scarlett, score by Lowell Liebermann and costume and set by John Macfarlane, with Federico Bonelli as Victor, Laura Morera as Elizabeth and Steven Mcrae as 'the Creature' on opening night. It was also broadcast live to cinemas on 18 May 2016. The production premiered 4 May 2016 and the run lasted until 24 May 2016. The ballet is being revived for the first time in the 2018/2019 season from the 5–23 March 2019 with a run of nine shows.
- Frankenstein, a play adapted by Christine Davey, premiered at La Mama Courthouse in 2023. This production updates the original story to explore the themes of gender rights, wealth, class and the patriarchy.
- Frankenstein, a play adaptation by Shake & Stair Theatre Co, premiered at Queensland Performing Arts Centre in 2023. The production design included modern technology to highlight the story's backdrop of the Industrial Revolution. Locations were represented as digital backdrops that would be shown on multiple screens across the stage. In 2024, the play was revived for a tour national, receiving seasons at the Princess Theatre in Melbourne and the Theatre Royal in Sydney.

=== Novels ===
The story of Frankenstein and "Frankenstein's monster", has formed the basis of many original novels over the years, some of which were considered sequels to Shelley's original work, and some of which were based more upon the character as portrayed in the Universal films. Yet others were completely new tales inspired by Frankenstein.

- 1913: Edgar Rice Burroughs' The Monster Men features a scientist going to a remote Indonesian island, there to try to create an artificial human being. He actually creates no less than thirteen of them – but there are many problems.
- 1957: French screenwriter Jean-Claude Carrière wrote six Frankenstein novels in 1957 and 1958 for Angoisse, the horror imprint of publisher Fleuve Noir, under the house pseudonym of Benoît Becker (with plotting assistance from Guy Bechtel for the first novel).
  - 1. La Tour de Frankenstein [The Tower of Frankenstein] (FNA No. 30, 1957)
  - 2. Le Pas de Frankenstein [The Step of Frankenstein] (FNA No. 32, 1957)
  - 3. La Nuit de Frankenstein [The Night of Frankenstein] (FNA No. 34, 1957)
  - 4. Le Sceau de Frankenstein [The Seal of Frankenstein] (FNA No. 36, 1957)
  - 5. Frankenstein Rôde [Frankenstein Prowls] (FNA No. 41, 1958)
  - 6. La Cave de Frankenstein [The Cellar of Frankenstein] (FNA No. 50, 1959)

Carrière followed the footsteps of the Monster, christened Gouroull, as he made his way back from Iceland, to Scotland, and then Germany and Switzerland, from the late 1800s to the 1920s. The plots have the Monster pursuing his own evil agenda, unafraid of the weaker humans. Even people who try to help or reason with him are just as likely to be killed by the inhuman fiend. Three further novels were published in the series by Black Coat Press. The books, The Quest of Frankenstein, The Triumph of Frankenstein and "The Spells of Frankenstein", were written by Frank Schildiner.

- 1972: Popular Library published a series of nine novels called The Frankenstein Horror Series. Despite the title of the series, only the first book, The Frankenstein Wheel (catalog #01544), by Paul W. Fairman, actually concerns the further exploits of Frankenstein's creation. The remaining eight books were unrelated stories using different horror themes.
- 1973: Frankenstein Unbound, by Brian Aldiss, combining the titles of Mary Shelley's novel with Percy Bysshe Shelley's Prometheus Unbound (1820), sends a time traveler from the 21st century back to Geneva in 1816, when Mary Wollstonecraft Godwin (as she was known then) was engaged in writing the original Frankenstein story.
- 1975: Robert J. Myers wrote a sequel to Shelley's novel called The Cross of Frankenstein (ISBN 0-397-01086-9), in which the illegitimate son of Victor Frankenstein finds the Creature alive and well and plotting the destruction of mankind in the wilds of America in 1816. Myers followed up the novel in 1976 with a second novel called The Slave of Frankenstein (ISBN 0-397-01126-1), where racism is added to the Creature's long list of sins as Frankenstein's illegitimate son again thwarts his plans to create a race of perfect slaves in the pre-Civil War America of 1859. A third novel in the series was announced, but never published.
- 1978: Allan Rune Pettersson wrote two novels in 1978 and 1989
  - Frankenstein's Aunt
  - Frankenstein's Aunt Returns
- 1986: In The Frankenstein Papers, Fred Saberhagen retells Shelley's story (with significant modifications) from the Monster's point of view. It is revealed that the novel had actually taken place during the American Revolution and Benjamin Franklin and his son play a major role in the novel. It is revealed through a series of letters, as well as the Monster's journal, that the Monster is actually an amnesiac humanoid alien who was disfigured by the electric explosion used in Victor's experiments, and that the creature that Victor had stitched together never in fact came to life. It is also revealed that Victor had performed the experiments under the behest of the sinister British nobleman Roger Seville, who had wished to create a race of supermen so as to form a colony of slaves and to defeat the American rebels. It is also implied that Seville and his hunchbacked assistant Small had murdered Victor's family in order to blackmail him, and that the novel was actually written by Robert Walton (who wanted to profit from the slave business) as a means to spread distrust to the Monster. However, Benjamin rescues the alien and helps him regain his memory with the help of Cagliostro; the book ends with the alien departing Earth, and deciding that, despite the cruelty men like Seville are capable of, men like Benjamin Franklin are the true examples of the human race.
- 1986: In Stephen King's It, the monster "It" takes the form of Frankenstein's Monster.
- 1994: Leonore Fleischer wrote a novelization of the Kenneth Branagh film.
- 1997: Frankenstein According to Spike Milligan is one of a series of parody novels by Spike Milligan. In this, Milligan crafts a bizarre story, with many gags based on specific moments and instances from the text of the novel, such as "I am self-educated: for the first fourteen years of my life I ran wild on the common. At the end of that time I fell exhausted to the ground."
- 2003: Jim Benton has written a series of children's chapter books about a female mad scientist that goes by the name Franny K. Stein
- 2004: Dean Koontz has written a series of Frankenstein novels titled Dean Koontz's Frankenstein. These stories are set in modern-day New Orleans, looking at Victor Frankenstein and his Monster (now known as Deucalion) having survived to the present day, with Deucalion recruiting a pair of New Orleans detectives to oppose the plans of Victor Helios (Frankenstein's modern alias) to destroy humanity and replace them with his 'New Race'.
- 2007 Larry Correia's Monster Hunter International series features a government agent known as Special Agent Franks, who is eventually revealed to have been a golem created in the 1700s by Johann Konrad Dippel that inspired Mary Shelley. In contrast to the novel, Dippel educates Franks before sending him out into the world.
- 2008: Peter Ackroyd's The Casebook of Victor Frankenstein is a postmodern retelling of the original story in which Victor Frankenstein encounters Percy Bysshe Shelley while studying in London. (ISBN 978-0-7011-8295-3)
- 2012: Monster: A Novel of Frankenstein by Dave Zeltserman, retells Mary Shelley's 1818 novel Frankenstein; or, The Modern Prometheus from the perspective of the Creature, presenting him as a tragic hero and Dr. Victor Frankenstein as a sadistic villain.
- 2012: The Fear Index by Robert Harris uses artificial intelligence as a metaphor for Frankenstein's Monster.
- 2015: Mackenzi Lee's debut novel,This Monstrous Thing, is a young adult retelling of Frankenstein set in an alternate fantastical world. The novel's protagonist, Alastair Finch, uses clockwork technology to resurrect his (deceased) brother. Shelley's Frankenstein is published in Finch's world, so both men (human and Monster) hide as society tries to identify the "real" subjects in Shelley's tale. (ISBN 978-0062382788)
- 2017: The Strange Case of the Alchemist's Daughter by Theodora Goss depicts Adam as an antagonist to a group of "monstrous" women, each of whom "must contend with the monstrous bodies they've been given, in most cases against their will, by men acting on ideological impulse." As well as Adam himself, the protagonists include Justine Frankenstein, the "bride" Frankenstein created in the novel from the corpse of the family's dead servant, who was brought back to life without her original memories.

=== Comics ===
The Monster has also been the subject of many comic book adaptations, ranging from the ridiculous (a 1960s series portraying The Monster as a superhero; see below), to more straightforward interpretations of Shelley's work.

==== Dick Briefer's Frankenstein (1940–1954) ====
In 1940, cartoonist Dick Briefer wrote and drew a Frankenstein's-Monster comic book title for Crestwood Publications's Prize Comics, beginning with a standard horrific version, updated to contemporary America, but then in 1945 crafting an acclaimed and well-remembered comedic version that spun off into his own title, Frankenstein Comics. The series ended with issue #17 (Jan.-Feb. 1949, but was revived as a horror title from #18-33 (March 1952 - Oct.-Nov. 1954). The original Prize version served as catalyst for an intra-company crossover, where all characters starring in Prize Comics at the time teamed up to fight Frankenstein.

==== DC Comics ====
DC Comics' Movie Comics #1 (April 1939) featured an eight-page fumetti adaptation of the film Son of Frankenstein.

The Monster appeared in Superman No. 143 (February 1961), in a story entitled "Bizarro Meets Frankenstein!"

In 1973 the "Spawn of Frankenstein" appeared in the Phantom Stranger comic, written by Len Wein. The portrayal of the Monster was as a reclusive, sympathetic character who had been living alone in the Arctic since the death of his creator.

A 1995 Batman special called Batman: Castle of the Bat by Jack C. Harris and Bo Hampton amalgamates Batman and Frankenstein. Bruce Wayne fills the role of Victor Frankenstein, wishing to revive his deceased father. Having successfully done so, his creation becomes the monstrous "Bat-Man", a hulking figure in a rough analogue of the Batman costume who preys upon highwaymen, similar to the one who took the lives of the (this story's) parents of Bruce Wayne. Batman's butler Alfred Pennyworth is changed to a hunchbacked dwarf named Alfredo, filling the "Igor" role.

In The Superman Monster (1999), Lex Luthor is Viktor Luther, the creator. He discovers the spacecraft that would have carried the infant Superman to Earth. Inside, however, is only the skeleton of a child. Using the Kryptonian technology, he is able to animate his (unintentionally) super-powered creature, which initially resembles Bizarro. The creature flees and is raised by the kindly couple Johann and Marta Kant. They name the creature Klaus, after their dead son. The story features the Lois Lane character becoming "the Bride" to Superman's Creature.

DC Comics and Roy Thomas revived the character "The Spawn of Frankenstein" in Young All-Stars; he then appeared in Grant Morrison's Seven Soldiers of Victory. Here, Frankenstein is a Milton-quoting, gun-toting warrior battling to prevent the end of the world. In addition, DC's team of movie monster-esque soldiers known as the Creature Commandos featured a character that resembled the Universal Pictures version of Frankenstein's Monster; Private Elliot "Lucky" Taylor was nearly killed after stepping on a land mine, but was grotesquely reconstructed into a "Patchwork Creature" (as designated by the Who's Who in the DC Universe entry on the Creature Commandos), and later rendered mute by a suicide attempt. Later, DC Comics debuted an unrelated superhero (and member of the Teen Titans) called "Young Frankenstein."

In Warren Ellis and John Cassaday's Planetary, the protagonist, Elijah Snow, discovers an abandoned laboratory, filled with patchwork undead monsters. It is heavily implied that the lab belonged to Victor Frankenstein, and that, alongside Count Dracula, the Invisible Man, and Sherlock Holmes, Frankenstein had been part of a covert 19th century conspiracy to shape the direction of the future.

In the comic book Major Bummer, Louie defends the common misnaming of the monster as "Frankenstein": Dr. Frankenstein is, so to speak, the monster's "father", and it is only right that a son should have his father's family name. This is also the argument taken by the Seven Soldiers incarnation.

In September 2011, The New 52 rebooted DC's continuity. In this new timeline, the Seven Soldiers' version of the character is re-established in the ongoing series Frankenstein, Agent of S.H.A.D.E..

==== Marvel Comics ====
The monster appeared as a foe to Marvel Comics' X-Men in issue #40 of their eponymous series (January 1968). In the story, written by Roy Thomas, the monster had various powers, including incredible strength, optic beams, and magnetized feet. He was an ambassador sent to Earth by aliens in the 1850s, but upon arrival, he went berserk. His fellow aliens followed him to the North Pole, where he was frozen. In the present, he was discovered by scientists and thawed. According to Professor X, this android was the inspiration for Shelley's novel.

The Monster of Frankenstein, the first five issues of which (Jan.-September 1973) contained a faithful (in spirit at least) retelling of Shelley's tale before transferring the Monster into the present day and pitting him against James Bond-inspired evil organizations. The artist, Mike Ploog, recalled, "I really enjoyed doing Frankenstein because I related to that naive monster wandering around a world he had no knowledge of — an outsider seeing everything through the eyes of a child."

In Invaders #31, the Invaders, searching for the Human Torch and Toro, disappear in Switzerland. The Invaders' investigation brings them face to fist with Frankenstein. A wheelchair-using Nazi scientist and a Japanese doctor plan to transplant said Nazi scientist's brain into Captain America's body. The Invaders have to fight Frankenstein in the issue (Frankenstein is dressed as a Nazi officer).

==== Other publishers ====
Classic Comics #26 (December 1945), reprinted in Classics Illustrated #26, had versions of the Shelley novel.

Dell Comics published a superhero version of the character in the comic book series Frankenstein #2-4 (September 1966 - March 1967; issue #1, published Oct. 1964, featured a very loose adaptation/update of the 1931 Universal Pictures movie).

In 1972, French comics publisher Aredit devoted seven issues of its digest-sized Hallucinations horror comic magazine to adapt Jean-Claude Carrière's Frankenstein novels.

In 1973, Dargaud published Dracurella, by Spanish born comic creator Julio Ribera (1927–2018), in the French comic magazine Pilote, which featured both Victor Frankenstein and his monster.

In 1991, Dark Horse Comics issued an adaptation of the 1931 Universal film.

In 1992, issue #2 of Archie Comics' Teenage Mutant Ninja Turtles Adventures Special had story that involved a horror movie that the Teenage Mutant Ninja Turtles were watching where Frankenstein's monster, a vampire that might be Count Dracula, a werewolf that might be the Wolf Man, and the gill-man working together to save the Bride of Frankenstein from an unnamed mad scientist. Because of Krang attacking the Ninja Turtles in their lair and trying to zap them with his mutation ray, their television was destroyed and a two-headed hybrid monster called Monsterex manifested out of thin air. Besides one of heads being of Frankenstein's monster, Monsterex also had its super-strength.

The Monster is Monster in My Pocket #13. He appears among the good monsters in the comic book (1991), the video game (1991), the animated special (1992), and the 2003 animated series. In the comics, he was relatively inarticulate, represented by hyphens between each syllable he spoke, but possessed of simple wisdom and strong morals. This characterization was essentially characterized in the video game, where he was a playable character, and his only line of dialogue in the cut scenes was "Yeah..." In the animated special, he was known as "Big Ed" and was essentially a comic simpleton.

Junji Ito serialized a manga adaptation of the novel, which was collected and published by Asahi Sonorama as the last tankōbon volume of The Junji Ito Horror Comic Collection in 1999.

In 2001, Curtis Jobling released a picture book titled Frankenstein's Cat, which focused on Frankenstein's first creation; a cat named Nine (due to being made up of nine different cats). A television adaptation aired in 2008 on CBBC.

2004 saw the debut of Doc Frankenstein, written by the Wachowskis (the writer-director team of The Matrix) and drawn by Steve Skroce. The book tells the continuing adventures of Frankenstein's monster, who has since adopted his creator's name and became a hero through the ages.

In 2005, Dead Dog Comics produced a sequel to the Frankenstein mythos with Frankenstein: Monster Mayhem, written by R. D. Hall with art by Jerry Beck. In Dead Dog's version, the Monster sets out to create his own Necropolis.

Also in 2005, Speakeasy Comics put out their sequel, The Living and the Dead, written by Todd Livingston and Robert Tinnell, with art by Micah Farritor. In it, Victor, now calling himself Hans, must create a new body for his first cousin who wants her syphilitic son to remain alive after a vicious beating, and she coerces him to do so under fear of exposing him for who he really is. Half-crazed due to the disease, the newly-born monster proceeds to start a Grand Guignol theater in Ingolstadt until Victor puts him down with the help of the first Monster he ever created. As thanks, Victor begins work on the last attempt he will make at playing God, and begins to build the original Creature a mate.

In 2005, Puffin Books released a graphic novel adaptation adapted by Gary Reed with art from Frazer Irving.

The 2006 Beckett Entertainment/Image comics graphic novel The Cobbler's Monster: A Tale of Gepetto's Frankenstein features an amalgamation between Gepetto and Victor Frankenstein, who reanimates his dead son.

In 2006, Eros Comix published Adult Frankenstein, a comic book with Frankenstein X-rated stories (featuring also other classic monsters) all written by Enrico Teodorani (creator of Djustine), with cover by Joe Vigil and interior art by some of the best Italian authors in the erotic comics field.

Also in 2006, Big Bang Comics published an issue of Big Bang Presents featuring a superhero incarnation of the Monster called Super Frankenstein.

Manga artist Mitsukazu Mihara published a collection of six short stories entitled Beautiful People on October 20, 2001. The main story, also titled "Beautiful People", follows a woman who had plastic surgery done hoping to become beautiful and loved, but after she meets a young girl stitched together from corpses, she realizes that girl was the truly beautiful one because of the love that she gave.

The 2007 manga series Embalming: The Another Tale of Frankenstein, published by Shueisha, is based on the idea that Victor Frankenstein actually existed and created an artificial human from body parts of dead people and that 150 years after this event, numerous doctors across Europe are using what is left of his notes to try and create their own monsters. The series also features characters reading Frankenstein; or, The Modern Prometheus.

In 2017 Boom! Studios published Victor LaValle's Destroyer as a limited series comic book serving as a sequel to Shelley's work in which Dr. Frankenstein's descendant resurrects her son after he was murdered by police. The series features Frankenstein's monster and applies the original novel's themes of vengeance, horror, and scientific hubris to medical and police violence against Black people. The series was well-received, receiving the 2018 Bram Stoker Award for Best Graphic Novel.

=== Toys and games ===
Frankenstein's Monster appears in the Konami video game series Castlevania numerous times, with its name being "the Monster" or "the Creature", often as a major boss, but sometimes as a regular enemy. The Monster usually has the appearance of the Karloff/Universal version; however, the 2010 series reboot Castlevania: Lords of Shadow features a completely different-looking boss known as the "Mechanical Monstrosity", created some time prior to 1047 by "Friedrich von Frankenstein".

Several other video game version are also available, including Bride of Frankenstein (Commodore 64 and ZX Spectrum), Frankenstein: Through the Eyes of the Monster - A Cinematic Adventure Starring Tim Curry (PC CD-ROM) and Mary Shelley's Frankenstein, (Super NES, Genesis, Sega CD) based on the 1994 film of the same name. Other games featuring the monster include Frankenstein: The Monster Returns for the original Nintendo Entertainment System and Frankenstein's Monster for the Atari 2600.

A Frankenstein-like monster called Victor von Gerdenheim is a playable character in the fighting game series Darkstalkers, along with many other monsters from popular culture.

Frankenstein's Monster also appears in the video game adaptation of the film Van Helsing. He only appears as a non-playable character.

The role-playing game Promethean: The Created by White Wolf Publishing, focuses on beings created from human remains and animated by "the Divine Fire" who seek to attain humanity. One of the "Lineages" (groupings) of said creatures is that of the Frankensteins, who, like their namesake, are crafted from the best parts of multiple corpses and brought to life by lightning. The Monster himself, going by the name John Verney, appears in some of the book's fiction and illustrations.

In 1989, the line of action figures for The Real Ghostbusters featured figures of several Universal Monsters, including Frankenstein's Monster.

In 2002, LEGO released a Dr. Frankenstein and Monster set as part of the LEGO Studios toy line. In 2011, a new green-skinned Minifigure called Monster resembles the creature.

The 2008 video game Fable II contains a quest in which a man named Victor is attempting to reanimate the body of a deceased woman, both homages to the book. Upon completion of the quest, if the player buys the house, it unlocks an area known as "the Shelley Tomb", a reference to the author of the novel.

In the 2009 Wii game MadWorld, Frankenstein's Monster appears as a boss battle at the base of a dungeon, and is simply called "Frank" with bolts in his back, rather than in his neck as common stereotypes depict. He is also shown as being regenerative when connected to an electric chair, and his size well exceeds the usually large 7'0" to go as much as 20'0".

In Atlus' popular Persona series, the residents of the "Velvet Room", a supernatural room that is "Between mind and matter", are named after characters from the Frankenstein series, namely Igor, Elizabeth, Margaret, Theodore, Marie, Lavenza, Caroline, and Justine.

In 2019, Plaid Hat Games released Abomination: The Heir of Frankenstein, a board game sequel to Mary Shelley's Frankenstein; or, The Modern Prometheus, taking place 20 years after the events of the novel. In Abomination, the Creature lives and recruits scientists in Paris (the role of the players) to carry on the work of Victor Frankenstein, while Captain Walton seeks to stop the competition and fulfill his vow.

Also in 2019, Steel Wool Studios released Curse of Dreadbear, a Halloween-themed downloadable content pack to their virtual reality game Five Nights at Freddy's: Help Wanted. The eponymous Dreadbear is a Frankenstein version of series mascot Freddy Fazbear, and was initially named "Franken Freddy" during Curse of Dreadbear's development. Dreadbear is included in merchandise and cameos in Five Nights at Freddy's: Security Breach on cardboard cutouts.

Frankenstein's Monster appears in the horror fighting game Terrordrome 2: Reign of the Legends. This version of the Monster considers himself the legitimate son of Victor Frankenstein, explaining why the game calls him 'Frankenstein' instead of 'Frankenstein's Monster'.

Valve Corporation's upcoming third person shooter Deadlock features the Creature as a playable character named "Victor". His appearance is inspired by the description of Frankenstein's Monster in the original novel, although it also takes cues from the Karloff/Universal version, like bolts embedded in his neck and back as well as association with lightning.

The Creature of Dr. Frankenstein appears as the main character in the 2019 video game 'The Wanderer: Frankenstein's Creature' (Nintendo Switch, PC, iOS/Android). The game was co-produced by La Belle Games and Arte and is a point-and-click narrative adventure which features a story based more closely on Mary Shelley's novel than a number of modern popular culture references to Frankenstein.

The popular Fashion-Doll line Monster High (the concept of the line being children of famous monsters attending a high school) has a character called "Frankie Stein", who is the daughter of Frankenstein's Monster and his Bride.

The Transformers: Collaborators toyline features a Decepticon called Frankentron in its crossover with the Universal Classic Monsters. While his robot form resembles Frankenstein's monster, he is a retooled version of Impactor from the War for Cybertron: Siege toyline.

=== Other usages ===
In the 1920s, carbon monoxide was regarded as the Frankenstein of civilization in the context of humankind's industrial production of the gas and widespread problems with carbon monoxide poisoning leading to the notion of carbon monoxide as "the automaton that turns on its maker, pursues him to the ends of the earth and finally destroys him”.

Science fiction author Isaac Asimov coined the term Frankenstein complex for the fear of robots.

Frankensteining is a term used by abusers of crystal methamphetamine to calm themselves by disassembling and reassembling objects. The term is used in that subculture and is recently gaining wider currency: it has been used in an episode of CSI: Miami and has four different definitions in Urban Dictionary, all with the same meaning of assembling parts from diverse sources.

Frankenstein or Franken- is sometimes used as a prefix to imply artificial monstrosity as in "Frankenfood", a politically charged name, coined by the American academic Paul Lewis, for genetically manipulated foodstuffs. The Franken- prefix can also mean anything assembled haphazardly from originally disparate elements, especially if those parts were previously discarded by others—for example, a car built from parts salvaged from many other cars. For many years Eddie Van Halen played a guitar built in such a manner which he called the "Frankenstrat".

In 1971, General Mills introduced "Franken Berry", a strawberry-flavored corn cereal whose mascot is a variation of the Monster from the 1931 movie.

"Frankenstein" is the name of a character in the 1975 movie Death Race 2000 and its 2008 remake Death Race. The first incarnation was portrayed by veteran actor David Carradine and the second by Jason Statham.

The 1984 novel Gothic Romance by Emmanuel Carrère is about the writing of Frankenstein, told from John William Polidori's perspective.

George A. Romero's 1985 film Day of the Dead features a scientist conducting experiments on zombies nicknamed "Frankenstein".

The hit song China in Your Hand by the British rock band T'Pau employs the story of Frankenstein, and Mary Shelley's writing of it, in its role as a classic cautionary tale.

In David Brin's science fiction novel Kiln People, defective golems that become autonomous are called "frankies".

Mewtwo of the Pokémon franchise has been likened to Frankenstein's Monster in regards to being born through an artificial means and discontent with the fact.

In season 3 of Beast Wars Megatron clones Dinobot, making a Frankenstein's Monster out of the clone by transmetallizing him with the Transmetal Driver and adding the half of Rampage's mutant spark he cut out earlier. The result was an extremely mutated Transmetal II minion under the influence of his "half-brother's" evil.

In 2006, the book The 101 Most Influential People Who Never Lived listed Dr. Frankenstein's Monster [sic] at #6.

The California Medical Association, in a rather humorous gesture, chose Halloween 2006 to announce that Dr. Richard Frankenstein had been elected president of the organization. He had previously been president of the Orange County Medical Association in 1995-1996.

Frankenstein is a character in the Korean web-comic manhwa Noblesse. He, like that of the actual character Frankenstein, is a scientist, but the similarities end there. Through his research he has gained immortality and immense power. He now serves the most powerful of all vampires, the Noblesse.

Pop artist Eric Millikin created a large mosaic portrait of Frankenstein's Monster out of Halloween candy and spiders as part of his "Totally Sweet" series in 2013.

The character Professor Franken Stein from Soul Eater is a composite of Victor Frankenstein and the Monster, covered in stitches with a screw through his head as the result of self-experimentation.

In Hellsing, Alexander Anderson is based on Frankenstein's Monster, given that his name came from a song that has a reference about Frankenstein's Monster, his abilities are similar and he is referred to as God's Monster after using the nail of Helena.

Frankenstein's Monster appears as the Berserker class Servant of the Black Faction in the Fate/stay night spin-off Fate/Apocrypha. This depiction of the Monster is a young female homunculus in a wedding gown.

== See also ==
- Dracula in popular culture
