= Space Mandino =

American singer-songwriter

- Born: Illinois
- Genres: Folk, Indie rock, Experimental
- Instrument(s): Vocals, Banjo, Guitar, Overtone singing, Dulcimer, Harmonium
- Years active: 2003–present
- Labels: Ear Cabbage Records
- Website: www.earcabbage.com

“Space” Mandino is an American singer-songwriter from Chicago, Illinois, known for his overtone singing, five-string banjo and harmonium. His music is experimental and contains folk, rockabilly, and bluegrass elements. The lyrics are those of old horror movies and misshapen folklore, with song titles that include "Jesse James meets Frankenstein's Daughter", "Satan in a Jesus Suit", and "Ballad of the Space Zombies". His instrumentation ranges from guitar to appalachian dulcimer to washtub bass. The overtone singing style is called Sygyt and is a form of Tuvan Khoomei.

Under the label Ear Cabbage Records, Mandino released his solo album Robots from the Graveyard in 2003 under the name "Space Mandino". His follow-up Experimental Experimentation (with bio-mechanical laboratory scraps) was released in 2007.

The singing of Joy Dumas is featured on songs "Intergalactic Zombies from Outer Space" and "The Sun Shines on my Grave".

== Discography ==
Albums:

- Robots from the Graveyard (2003)
- Experimental Experimentation (with bio-mechanical laboratory scraps) (2007)
