= Frankenstein: The Monster Returns =

1991 video game

- Cover art
- Developer: Tose
- Publisher: Bandai America
- Platform: Nintendo Entertainment System
- Release: July 1991
- Genre: Action
- Mode: Single-player

Frankenstein: The Monster Returns is an action video game developed by Tose. The game has a player confront the recently resurrected Frankenstein's monster who had kidnapped Emily, the daughter of the village elder. The game has the player moving through side-scrolling levels collecting fighting monsters while collecting weapon and health upgrades in order to rescue Emily from the monster.

Like other games that draw influence from the characters in Mary Shelley's Frankenstein; or, The Modern Prometheus (1818), it predominantly is influenced by the iconography of the Universal's Frankenstein films. It was published by Bandai America on July 1991 for the Nintendo Entertainment System. The game received unenthusiastic response in Electronic Gaming Monthly who found not standing out from various other recent action games, while VideoGame found it exciting with a challenging final boss.

== Gameplay ==
Gameplay in Frankenstein: The Monster Returns. The game features side-scrolling stages where the player character must traverse levels and overcome their various enemy characters.

After years of the Monster laying in his grave in the cemetery, the local villagers were at peace. When lightning strikes the monster's tombstone, it returns from the dead and attacks the nearby village. The creature kidnaps Emily, the daughter of the village elder. The creature uses his magic to gather group of monsters to protect him from anyone who dare to challenge him. The goal of the game is for the player to rescue Emily from the monster.

Contemporary reviewers in Electronic Gaming Monthly described Frankenstein: The Monster Returns as an action game. The game features side-scrolling with beat-'em up style elements. In each of the four levels in the game, the player will be confronted by various monsters which can be defeated by punching or kicking them. Items may be found by defeating enemies, being offered by characters in the game, or appear in treasure chests. At the end of each stage, the player can enter into a combat with a boss character that takes several successful strikes to defeat. Upon beating a boss, the player can receive bonuses such as increased life and enhanced weapons.

The player can also find various weapons such as swords, clubs and maces that increase their fighting ability. Various other items include red balls, slings, fire and bombs which add a projectile attack to the player's arsenal. Other items are used to restore health such as hearts and life and blue potions can be used to raise the maximum amount of health. Life is used as a collectable item, which is stored and used later at the player's discretion. If the player is struck by a monster, their weapon's strength is lowered.

== Development and release ==
Frankenstein: The Monster Reborn was developed by Tose. Tose was a company that had a reputation as being what Chris Kerr of Game Developer described as a "ghost developer", as a company who is usually never credited on the games they work on.

Academic Tanya Krzywinska said the game was not a direct adaptation of Mary Shelley's Frankenstein; or, The Modern Prometheus (1818), but drew from the iconography of the Universal's Frankenstein films. This was an approach to a number of games that drew from Shelley's book at the period such as Bride of Frankenstein (1987) or Dr. Franken (1992).

Bandai America presented Frankenstein at the 1990 Summer Consumer Electronics Show (CES) in Chicago alongside Dick Tracy and The Adventures of Gilligan's Island (1990). The game was released for the Nintendo Entertainment System in July 1991.

== Reception ==
Reception

Review scores
Publication	Score
Electronic Gaming Monthly	6/10, 6/10, 5/10, 6/10
VideoGame	7/10

In Electronic Gaming Monthly, the four reviewers each commented on the game saying its controls were not precise and its graphics were "just OK". Ed Semrad of the magazine said it was "good by last year's standards." and did not stand out from other similar games. A reviewer in the Brazilian magazine VideoGame called it an exciting game with the final battle being very difficult.

From retrospective reviews, Mike Wilson of Bloody Disgusting said despite the games small amount of levels, it was compensated by its challenge due to issues involving hit detection and "overly cheap enemies". He summarized that the game as not bad, but not in the same league as the similar Castlevania (1986) by Konami.

== See also ==
- Frankenstein in popular culture
- List of Nintendo Entertainment System games
