= Joined at the Heart =

Joined at the Heart was a musical with music and lyrics by Graham Brown & Geoff Meads (latterly of successful UK country music duo Tennessee Twin), book by Frances Anne Bartam and directed by Frances Brownlie. A new musical, the show told the love story of Victor Frankenstein and his step sister Elizabeth, a young orphan girl taken in by Victor's parents and cared for as if she were their own daughter. When Victor's mother dies, he vows to end the suffering that death brings. While in pursuit of eternal life, the love story between Victor and Elizabeth evolves to a thrilling climax all set to an enthralling musical and lyrical score.

Joined at the Heart reached the final of the Worldwide Search for Musicals competition. The show saw its first performance at The Junction 2 in Cambridge, UK from 1–4 August 2007. Following its Cambridge run it moved to the 2007 Edinburgh Festival Fringe for a one-week run at C Venues featuring a cast of 35 onstage and several back stage personnel.

Joined at the Heart was the first musical to be streamed live on the Internet via the Second Life virtual world, on Saturday 4 August 2007.

== See also ==
- Frankenstein; or, The Modern Prometheus, 1818 novel by Mary Shelley
