= Screamland =

Comic Book Series

Publication information
- Publisher: Image Comics
- Format: Limited series
- Genre: see below
- Publication date: 2008
- No. of issues: 10

Creative team
- Created by: Harold Sipe; Héctor Casanova
- Written by: Harold Sipe; Christopher Sebela
- Artist(s): Héctor Casanova; Lee Leslie

Screamland is an independent comic book series that was created by Harold Sipe and Héctor Casanova. The series was first launched as a five issue miniseries in 2008 and was followed by a second five-issue miniseries, Death of the Party, in 2011. Both miniseries were released through Image Comics. Sipe served as the writer for both miniseries and Héctor Casanova worked as the artist for the 2008 miniseries and as the cover artist for Death of the Party.

There are currently plans to create a third miniseries that follow the character of Frank as he travels to Japan and meets with other horror movie icons.

== Synopsis ==
Screamland follows the lives of three monsters turned Hollywood movie actors, Frank, the lupine Carl London, and The Count. Frank and Carl are washed up "has beens" that find it extremely difficult to gain regular work and are often forced to make money by very dodgy means- something that is made more difficult by Frank's rampant alcoholism and Carl's short temper and tendency to overindulge in everything. The Count has been more fortunate, as his eternal youth and an ongoing fascination with vampires has ensured that he will always have lucrative work, but the public scrutiny also has his price. While The Count is still popular, he feels that he has to hide his homosexuality in fear that the public will turn on him. The comic frequently mentions a fourth monster, The Mummy, that is only shown in flashbacks, various media, and in conversations by various characters.

The first volume is episodic in nature and looks at the daily lives of Frank, Carl, and The Count and sets up some of their personal history and interactions with one another. During this volume we learn about Frank's drinking problem, Carl's rampant and self-destructive hedonism, and The Count's willingness to achieve fame at the cost of his own personal happiness. Readers are shown that Carl and Frank's lack of work is something a direct result of their own actions, especially in Carl's case as his own actions frequently lead to him pushing all but his most steadfast friends away from him. Volume two, Death of the Party, tells a more linear story and has Carl and his friend, former television star Travis Walters, investigating the murder of "Izzy", The Invisible Man. He was murdered after promising to show Phantasmagorgya, a pornographic film starring several movie monsters that was deliberately kept out of the public eye. Carl and Travis solve the mystery, but almost ruining their fragile friendship in the process when Travis is told that Phantasmagorgya was never released because it was a sex tape-turned snuff film that could ruin the lives of multiple monster stars. (Prior to this Travis believed that the film was merely a sex tape recorded during a party he and Carl had attended in the 1970s.) Travis is horrified that Carl and other monsters murdered two women during Phantasmagorgya, as the monsters covered it up and did not do "the right thing" by reporting it. Carl responds by saying that Travis would have participated in the snuff film if he had not been passed out from drinking too much and that while the monsters may have killed her because of their own natures, Travis would have participated because he could and because he would have been able to get away with it. It's ultimately revealed that Izzy faked his own murder in order to receive attention but did not plan on the police and media paying little serious attention to his murder. He had been following Travis and Carl around during their investigations and realized that he was the biggest monster of them all, as he was willing to put all of monster-kind at risk of being hunted due to the snuff film, all in the pursuit of fame. Izzy gives Travis and Carl the movie, as he has decided to remain "dead" and spend the rest of his life in obscurity. Travis and Carl then reconcile.

== Characters ==
- Frank: The character of Frank references Frankenstein's monster. He is an alcoholic, which is mostly due to how he was created, his past prior to being brought on to the movie scene, his current lack of a fulfilling career or lifestyle, and his own sense of melancholy and self-defeat. The Count manages to persuade him into seeing a therapist. This character is a main character in the 208 miniseries but is only briefly shown in Death of the Party.
- Carl London: Carl is an extremely hedonistic and self-destructive werewolf based on the Wolfman. He is shown to have an extremely short temper and is frequently rude to others, as in the case of the vampire Tempest. Carl is willing to take on any job, which keeps him employed for the most part, but his own extremes often lead him to be at odds with the other characters. He's friends with Travis, who is shown to be one of the few characters willing to remain in constant contact with him- despite Travis's own disgust with Carl.
- The Count. The Count is a vampire based on Count Dracula. He is shown to be a closeted homosexual and in the first volume this leads to tensions between him and a popular entertainment show host with whom The Count previously had a one-night stand. He is frequently calmer than the other characters and regularly sees a therapist.
- The Mummy: The Mummy is based on the character Imhotep. He is not an active character in the series and is only referenced through conversations, various media, and flashbacks. The Mummy had previously attempted to start a career as a war-protesting folk singer, but was ultimately unsuccessful. He is shown to have left the country for various reasons, one of which was because he had murdered a stand-up comedian for heckling him, and in Death of the Party it is revealed by way of a news story that he is currently active in an anti-America terrorist group.
- Travis Walters: Travis Walters is a human character that had previously starred as a space ship technician similar to James Doohan's Star Trek character Montgomery Scott. Like his friend Carl, Travis is unable to find work like he used to and makes much of his money by appearing at fan conventions. Travis and Carl have been shown to have been friends for decades and while Travis was briefly horrified by Carl's reaction to the truth of the film Phantasmagorgya, he realizes that he has always known who Carl ultimately was and makes peace with this.
- Andrea Silverman: Andrea is the Hollywood agent of most of the monsters in the series. She is a ruthless character that is willing to do anything for her stars, including covering up murders perpetrated by her clients.

== Development ==
While creating the series, Sipe drew on his own experiences in Los Angeles and stated that "The first volume really became a meditation on my time there and a lot of thinking on fame culture and all the really awful stuff about pop culture filtered in as well." For the first volume Sipe chose to focus predominantly on monsters considered to be the most recognizable horror movie icons. In the second volume Sipe teamed up with fellow writer Christopher Sebela and as the two wanted to "go in a different direction" they chose to focus on lesser known monsters and how fame has treated them.

== Release history ==
- Screamland (2008, writer - Harold Sipe, artist - Héctor Casanova)
- Screamland: Death of the Party (2011, writer - Harold Sipe, artist - Lee Leslie, covers - Héctor Casanova)

== Reception ==
Critical reception for the Screamland series has been mostly positive and the first volume was named one of SF Site's "Editors' Choice Top 10 Best Books of the Year" for 2008. Ain't It Cool News praised the series, which they described as "classic monsters meet ENTORAGE [sic]". Wizard magazine awarded it the "Best Satire" category in 2008. The Library Journal was more mixed in their review for the first volume and wrote that "The mystery is complex, and the characterization is solid, but the story is disjointed and thin."
