= Monster: A Novel of Frankenstein =

2012 horror novel by Dave Zeltserman

- Author: Dave Zeltserman
- Publisher: The Overlook Press
- Publication date: 2012

Monster: A Novel of Frankenstein is a 2012 gothic horror novel by American author Dave Zeltserman. It retells Mary Shelley's 1818 novel Frankenstein; or, The Modern Prometheus from the perspective of the Creature, presenting him as a tragic hero and Dr. Victor Frankenstein as a sadistic villain.

== Plot ==
In nineteenth-century Bavaria, Friedrich Hoffmann, a young chemist, is framed for the brutal murder of his fiancée, Johanna. After being condemned and broken on the wheel, Friedrich re-awakens on a laboratory table with his brain inside a new body which has been assembled from material, presumably from animals and other corpses. Frankenstein is not a conflicted man of science, as he is depicted in Shelley's novel, but as an amoral sadist and devil-worshipper who uses alchemy and the occult, and who seeks to prove that humanity is inherently corrupt.

As Friedrich lies incapacitated in the laboratory, another of Frankenstein's victims, Charlotte/Sophie, who exists as a disembodied head, keeps him company. Friedrich remembers Frankenstein from when he was a chemist and suspects Frankenstein of being responsible for Johanna's death and framing him for her murder, all to obtain an educated brain. After many months, Frankenstein abandons his lab. Once Friedrich grows strong enough to break free of his bonds, he embarks on a vengeful journey across Europe to hunt down Frankenstein. Along the way he encounters many Gothic figures, including vampires, and Satanists. One chance encounter is with Samuel Hahnemann, the founder of homeopathy. A monk, Brother Theodore, gives him refuge and offers an outlook that serves as a counterpoint to Frankenstein's philosophy. He saves a young woman, Henriette, from being burned alive by villagers who have accused her of being a witch, only to lose her to a pack of shape-shifting vampires. Driven by a Frankenstein's satanic spells, he finds in the French Alps the castle Frankenstein has joined with the Marquis de Sade so that they may enact de Sade's unfinished novel Les 120 Journées de Sodome in reality.

Inside the castle Friedrich discovers that Frankenstein's satanic spells have made him Frankenstein's obedient slave. Frankenstein is amazed to learn that Friedrich has retained his memories. Hundreds of kidnapped young girls and children have been imprisoned within the castle's dungeon so that they may be used as actors in the planned drama. Frankenstein has kept Johanna's brain alive for future experiments and offers to restore her to life if Friedrich chooses which prisoner to be sacrificed for Johanna's new body. The girl, Mariel, that Friedrich chooses is sent to an isolated island off the coast of Scotland while Friedrich and Frankenstein travel to London so that Frankenstein can consult with other occultists and scientific researchers to gain the necessary knowledge for his planned operation. Once in London, Frankenstein takes Friedrich to a secret Hellfire Club where Friedrich encounters a gentleman vampire.

Friedrich, Frankenstein, and Henry Clervil travel to the Orkney island where Mariel is being kept. Frankenstein commands Friedrich to stay in the same cabin with Mariel, with the operation panned for the next day. Over the course of the night, Friedrich remembers the jimson weed that Hahnemann had given him and he makes a homeopathic tincture from the instructions he had been given. By morning, the remedy has freed him from Frankenstein's control. He forces Clervil to admit his role in framing him. In Clervil's panic to escape, he trips and hits his head on a rock, killing him. Friedrich allows Frankenstein to escape, rescues Mariel, and follows Frankenstein to the town of Clogherhead where Frankenstein's rowboat washes ashore. Friedrich frames Frankenstein for Clervil's murder.

Frankenstein is released from prison and returns to the castle to retrieve his occult books. Friedrich is waiting for him, having turned the castle into rubble. For months, Friedrich torments and spies on Frankenstein. Nightly, he uses one of the occult spells so that he may draw Frankenstein to him when desired. Frankenstein marries Elizabeth Lavenza, and on their wedding night, Friedrich attempts to tell Elizabeth about Frankenstein's many crimes. She accuses him of being the fiend, and in a blind rage he murders her.

Friedrich uses his spell to bring Frankenstein to the arctic so that Frankenstein will die in desolation. Captain Walton ends up rescuing Frankenstein, and after Frankenstein dies on Walton's ship, Friedrich travels to a remote lake to live out his life. Decades pass by. Frankenstein rescues women and children from Nazis. Death seems impossible for him. After many more years, he travels to Leipzig to visit Johanna's grave, and it's there that he sees a copy of Shelley's Frankenstein, and he decides to write the true story to counter the lies Frankenstein told Walton.

== Style ==
Ed Siegal, writing for WBUR, describes the prose as "spare and unfettered, the better to keep those pages turning". Joe Hartlaub at Bookreporter says it has "a highly literary style so that his book reads as if it were written during or shortly after the literary classic". Siegal identifies Universal Studios' 1930s horror films as an influence for the supernatural elements of the story. Dale Baily, writing for the Los Angeles Times, says the novel creates "a voice that sounds authentically like Shelley's while remaining entirely lucid to the contemporary reader." The Historical Novel Society says "Dave Zeltserman's highly readable style harmonizes beautifully with its 19th century European setting."

== Reception ==
Monster was named one of Booklist's Top 10 Horror Fiction books of 2013, and a top book of 2012 by WBUR. It received a starred review in Booklist, and was also reviewed by Publishers Weekly who calls the book a "rich and fun response to Shelley's classic". The Los Angeles Times writes how the novel's plot "maps almost perfectly onto the plot of Shelley's novel", Newsday, and Bookreporter says of the novel that it "follows Shelley's roadmap just enough to infuse the proceedings with a degree of familiarity, yet his point of view and unique deviations from the original story make every page a joy to read."

== Major themes ==
=== The corrosive nature of vengeance ===
The narrative is driven primarily by Friedrich's single-minded quest for revenge, which prompts an ongoing internal conflict regarding his remaining humanity. After being falsely executed and reanimated into an abomination, Friedrich's focus is entirely on hunting down Frankenstein. However, critics have pointed out that the novel pairs this brutal, noir-infused quest for justice with a poignant exploration of what it costs to preserve human decency. While Friedrich's rage is tightly focused, his journey increasingly shifts from personal retribution to a broader moral mission to save innocent lives from his creator's machinations. Ed Siegel at WBUR asks, "If Friedrich pursues vengeance will it make him as bad as Frankenstein? And if we cheer him on do we not prove Frankenstein right, that we, too, are as base as animals?"

=== What makes a monster ===
A central theme of the novel is the inversion of traditional roles regarding who or what constitutes a "monster". In contrast to Mary Shelley's original 1818 novel and typical cinematic adaptations where the creature acts as a tragic but ultimately homicidal force, Zeltserman flips the narrative polarities entirely. Publishers Weekly notes that the Friedrich is an articulate and likable hero who brings up questions of morality in response to extreme evil. Conversely, Dr. Victor Frankenstein is stripped of any tragic or noble scientific ambition and is instead presented as a sadist, occultist, and unmitigated villain. Reviewing for WBUR, Ed Siegel described Zeltserman's Dr. Frankenstein as a "Mengele-like sadist", emphasizing that the character embodies pure human evil rather than misguided scientific curiosity. Siegel further writes about Friedrich's mournfulness over what he has to do to stay alive, whether killing wolves who attack him or having to kill a woman to save her from life as a vampire, makes him an utterly sympathetic character, a Candide with no hope of reuniting with his Cunegonde.
