= Kiwi Kingston =

New Zealand wrestler and actor (1914–1992)

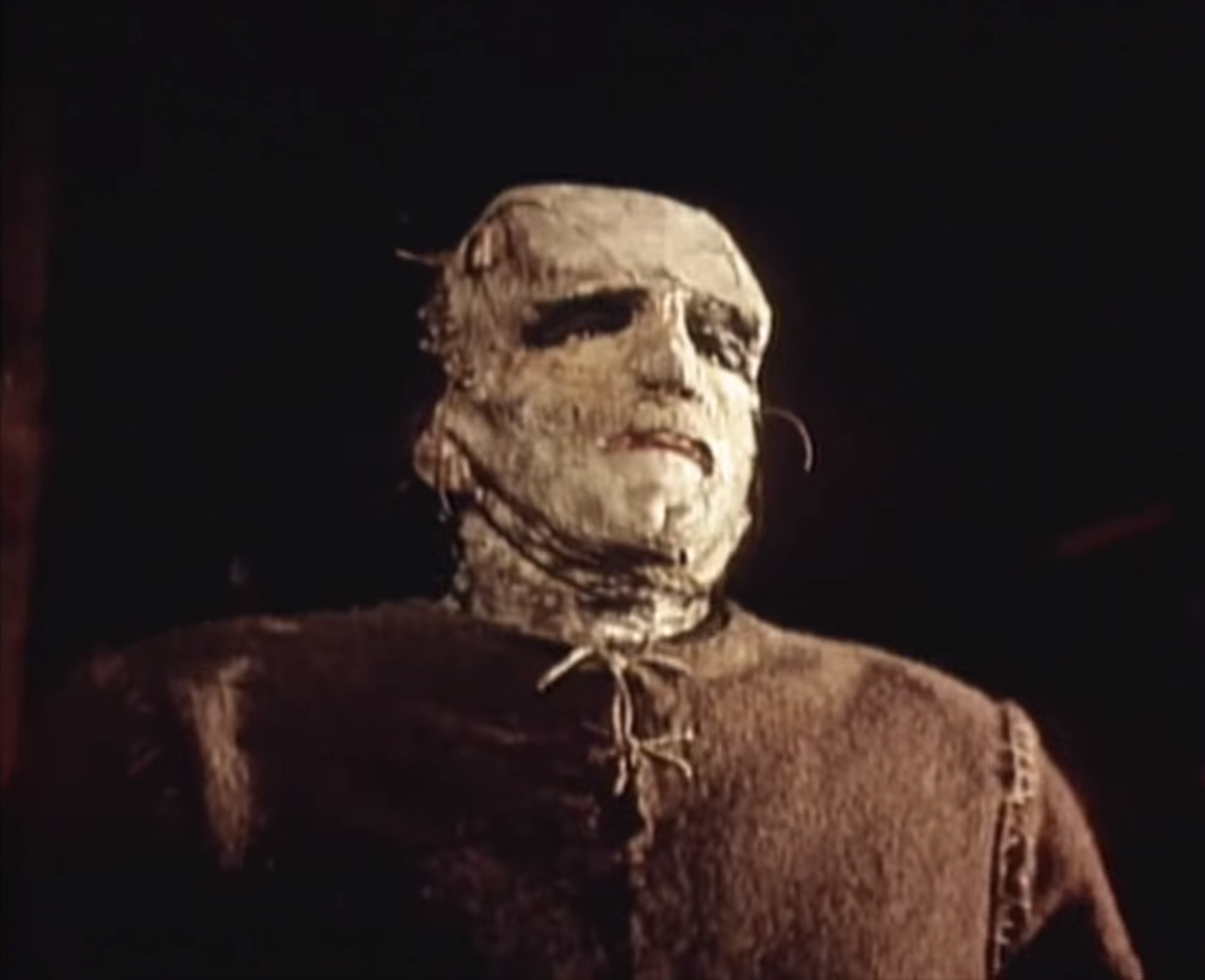
- Kingston as Frankenstein's monster in The Evil of Frankenstein
- Born: Ernest Walter Kingston; 1914; Banks Peninsula, New Zealand
- Died: 1992 (aged 77–78); Christchurch, New Zealand
- Occupations: Actor professional wrestler
- Years active: Professional wrestling career
- Ring name(s): Cowboy Kiwi; Ernie Kingston; Kiwi Kingston; Gaucho Kiwi
- Billed height: 6 ft 5 in (196 cm)
- Trained by: Anton Koolmann
- Debut: 1939
- Retired: 1970

Ernest Walter "Kiwi" Kingston (1914–1992) was a wrestler and film actor from New Zealand. He is relatively unknown, but still remembered for his role as the Karloff-like Frankenstein's monster in Hammer's The Evil of Frankenstein (1964). He also appeared in the film Hysteria (1965).

== Professional wrestling ==
Kingston was trained by Anton Koolmann. He was billed as 6 '5" in height, although New Zealand sources give his height at 6' 2" or 3". He experienced success in Europe starting in the late 1930s. He had matches with Bert Assirati and would often ride to the ring on horseback, dismounting on the ring apron.

== Filmography ==
Year	Title	Role	Notes
1964	The Evil of Frankenstein	The Creature	
1965	Hysteria	French Girl's Husband	
1967	They Came From Beyond Space	Garage mechanic (Small speaking role)	uncredited
