= Hysteria (1965 film) =

British murder mystery by Freddie Francis

- Theatrical release poster
- Directed by: Freddie Francis
- Written by: Jimmy Sangster
- Produced by: Jimmy Sangster
- Starring: Robert Webber; Anthony Newlands
- Cinematography: John Wilcox
- Music by: Don Banks
- Production company: Hammer Films
- Distributed by: Metro-Goldwyn-Mayer
- Release dates: 28 April 1965 (US); 27 June 1965 (UK)
- Running time: 85 minutes
- Country: United Kingdom
- Language: English

Hysteria is a 1965 British murder mystery film directed by Freddie Francis and starring Robert Webber and Anthony Newlands. It was written by Jimmy Sangster, produced by Hammer Films and released by Metro-Goldwyn-Mayer.

== Plot ==
American Chris Smith wakes up in an English hospital unable to remember anything of his life before a recent car accident.

Four months later, he has recovered physically but has still not retrieved his memory. His amnesia is being treated by Dr. Keller, a psychiatrist, who tells him that his bills are being paid by an anonymous benefactor, who has made an apartment available to him. Dr. Keller warns him that he might suffer hallucinations.

The only other link to his past is a photograph torn from a newspaper. Chris has fallen in love with Gina, his nurse.

Upon release from the hospital, Chris moves into a flat and hires Hemmings, a private investigator. Chris visits the photographer of the photo, who tells him that the subject is dead, the victim of a shower murder.

In his flat, Chris hears strange voices coming from next door: a couple arguing. He keeps seeing a woman around town, from time to time, who reminds him of the woman in the photo, and he discovers a bloody knife in his shower.

Chris receives a late night visit from Denise, who claims to be the widow of the man responsible for the automobile accident that caused Chris to lose his memory. Denise bears a remarkable resemblance to the woman in the photograph.

Denise plies Chris with drugs, and after one such episode, he discovers in his shower the body of a murdered woman, which later disappears.

Assisted by Hemmings, Chris tricks Denise and Keller into admitting that they are the murderers, having planned to frame him for the crime, and that the victim is the physician's wife. Chris is reunited with Gina.

== Cast ==
- Robert Webber as Chris Smith
- Anthony Newlands as Dr. Keller
- Jennifer Jayne as Gina McConnell
- Maurice Denham as Hemmings
- Lelia Goldoni as Denise James
- Peter Woodthorpe as Marcus Allan
- Sandra Boize as English girl
- Sue Lloyd as French girl
- John Arnatt as Mr. James
- Marianne Stone as Miss Grogan, Marcus Allan's secretary
- Irene Richmond as Mrs. Keller
- Kiwi Kingston as French girl's husband

== Reception ==
=== Critical ===
The Monthly Film Bulletin wrote:

Although the initial exposition is promising, this macabre melodrama develops less successfully and in an all too familiar vein, while the twist ending seems hardly good enough. The compensations are a few choice macabre or unanticipated moments, and Maurice Denham's intriguingly seedy private-eye.

Kine Weekly wrote:

Producer-writer Jimmy Sangster has been caught here in the web of his own cleverness. The plot is so intricate and involved that it leaves little opportunity for breath-taking moments and the surprise twist ending is thus made to seem trite: whilst far too many loose ends are left lying about. This is a pity because the opening scenes promise well, when Chris is, apparently, trying to remember his past, and the director has used the camera intelligently to create atmosphere. Robert Webber makes quite a good impression in the fantastically misleading role of Chris, and Anthony Newlands is a softly-spoken murderer as Dr. Keller, whilst Lelia Goldoni's Denise is beautifully bogus. Jennifer Jayne has a colourless job as Gina, and Maurice Denham enjoys himself as a quite incredible but amusingly seedy detective.

Leslie Halliwell wrote "Complicated and rather unsympathetic Hammer twister."

In The Radio Times Guide to Films David Parkinson gave the film 2/5 stars, writing:

Having presented Hammer with the sizeable hits, Paranoiac and Nightmare, Freddie Francis reteamed with screenwriter Jimmy Sangster to complete his psycho trilogy. Sadly, the bemusing experiences of amnesiac American tourist Robert Webber rarely set pulses racing, despite the menacing ministrations of nursing home shrink Anthony Newlands and a mysterious murder. Strewn with mind-bending visuals and preposterous dialogue, this is more mediocre than macabre.

=== Box office ===
The film performed disappointingly at the box office.

== Home media ==
Hysteria was released to DVD by Warner Home Video on 2 November 2011 via the Warner Archive DVD-on-demand service as a Region 0 widescreen DVD.
