= Frankenstein's monster =

1818 fictional character by Mary Shelley

- Frankenstein character
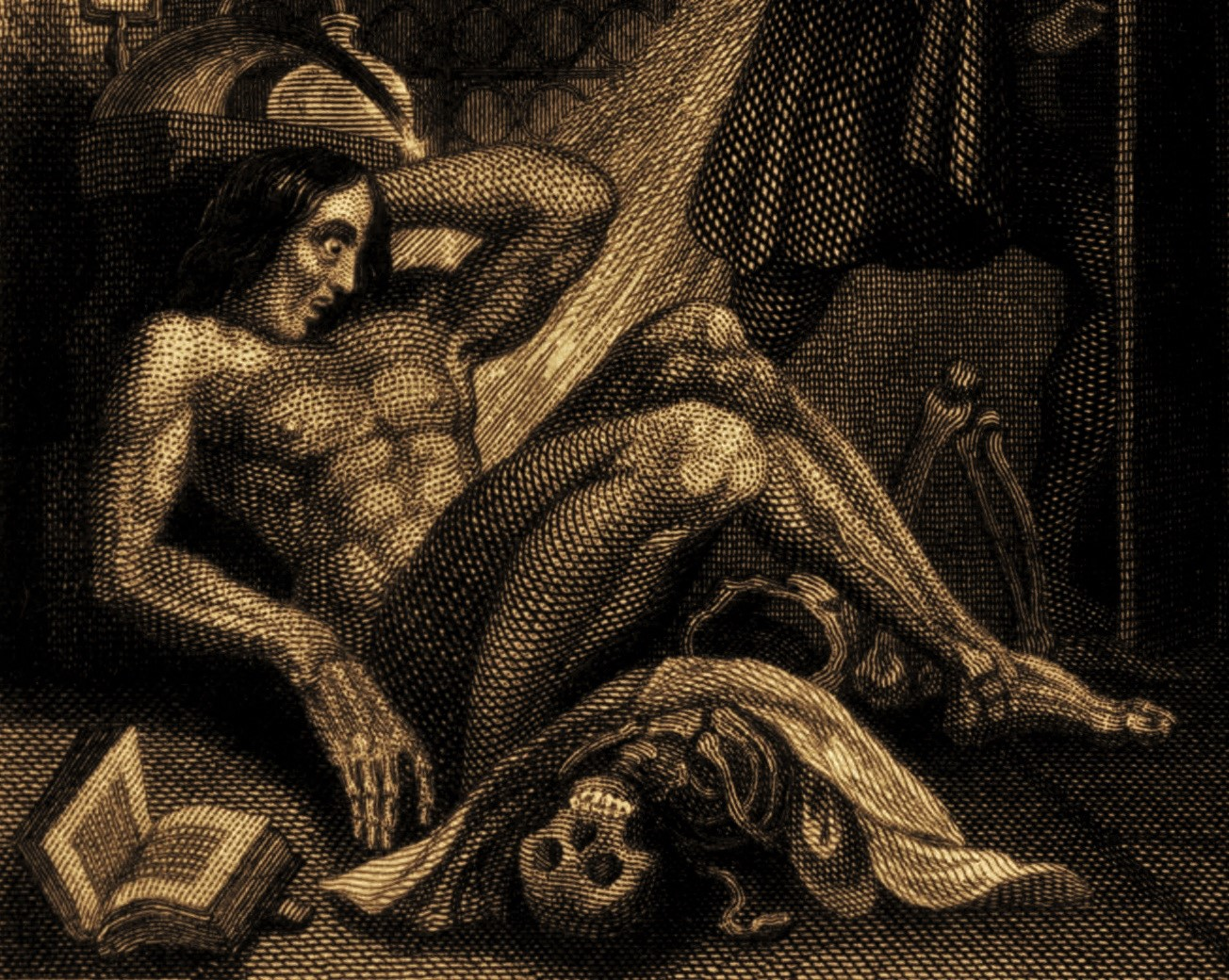
- Steel engraving (993 × 78 mm), for the frontispiece of the 1831 revised edition of Mary Shelley's Frankenstein; or, The Modern Prometheus, published by Colburn and Bentley, London
- First appearance: Frankenstein; or, The Modern Prometheus
- Created by: Mary Shelley

In-universe information
- Nicknames: "Creature", "fiend", "spectre", "the dæmon", "wretch", "devil", "thing", "being", "ogre" Adam
- Species: Simulacrum (made from different human body parts)
- Gender: Male
- Family: Victor Frankenstein (creator); Bride of Frankenstein (companion/predecessor; in some adaptions)

Frankenstein's monster, commonly referred to as Frankenstein, (Note: Frankenstein is properly the family name of the monster's creator, Victor Frankenstein. See § Names for explanation and other names.) is a fictional character that first appeared in Mary Shelley's 1818 novel Frankenstein; or, The Modern Prometheus as its main antagonist. Shelley's title compares the monster's creator, Victor Frankenstein, who later became the monster's namesake, to the mythological character Prometheus, who fashioned humans out of clay and gave them fire.

In Shelley's Gothic story, Victor Frankenstein builds the creature in his laboratory through an ambiguous method based on a scientific principle he discovered. Shelley describes the monster as 8 feet (240 cm) tall and emotional. The monster attempts to fit into human society but is shunned, which leads him to seek revenge against Frankenstein. According to the scholar Joseph Carroll, the monster occupies "a border territory between the characteristics that typically define protagonists and antagonists".

Frankenstein's creature became iconic in popular culture, and has been featured in various forms of media, including films, television series, merchandise and video games. The most popularly recognized version is Boris Karloff's portrayal of the monster in the films Frankenstein (1931), Bride of Frankenstein (1935), and Son of Frankenstein (1939), though that incarnation bears little resemblance to the source material.

== Names ==
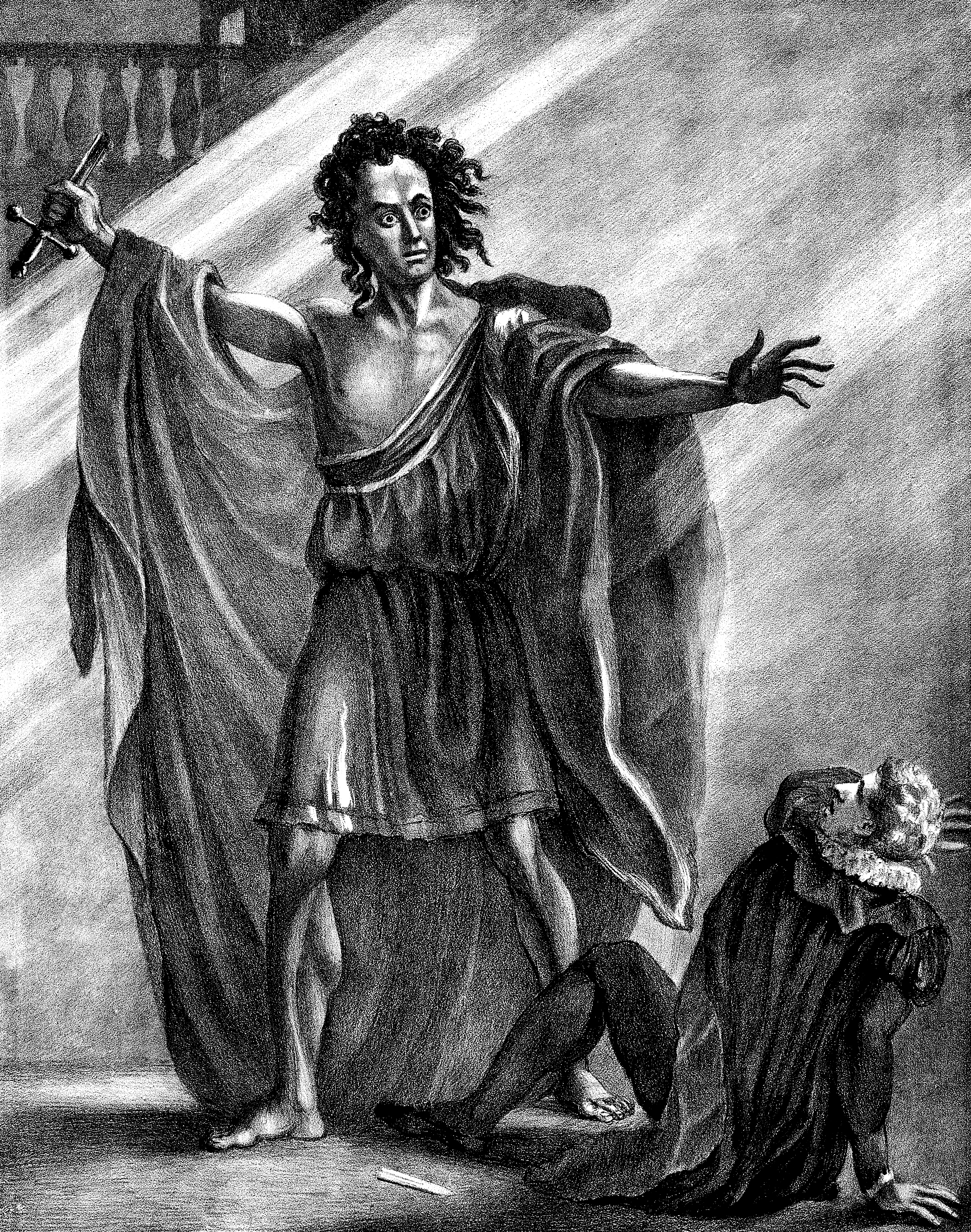
The actor T. P. Cooke as the monster in an 1823 stage production of Shelley's novel

Mary Shelley's original novel does not give the character a specific name. In the 1818 novel, Victor Frankenstein variously refers to his creation as the "creature", "fiend", "spectre", "dæmon", "wretch", "devil", "thing", "being", and "ogre". Frankenstein's creation refers to himself as a "monster" at least once, as do the residents of a hamlet who saw the creature towards the end of the novel.

As in Shelley's story, the creature's namelessness became a central part of the stage adaptations in London and Paris during the decades after the novel's first appearance. In 1823, Shelley herself attended a performance of Richard Brinsley Peake's Presumption, the first successful stage adaptation of her novel. "The play bill amused me extremely, for in the list of dramatis personae came, -------- by Mr T. Cooke," she wrote to her friend Leigh Hunt. "This nameless mode of naming the unnameable is rather good."

Within a decade of publication, the name of the creator, "Frankenstein", was used to refer to the creature, but it did not become firmly established until much later. The story was adapted for the stage in 1927 by Peggy Webling, and Webling's Victor Frankenstein does give the creature his name. However, the creature has no name in the Universal film series starring Boris Karloff during the 1930s, which was largely based upon Webling's play. The 1931 Universal film treated the creature's identity in a similar way as Shelley's novel: in the opening credits, the character is referred to merely as "The Monster" (the actor's name is replaced by a question mark, but Karloff is listed in the closing credits). However, in the sequel Bride of Frankenstein (1935), the frame narration by a character representing Shelley's friend Lord Byron does refer to the monster as Frankenstein. Nevertheless, the creature soon enough became best known in the popular imagination as "Frankenstein". This usage is sometimes considered erroneous, but some usage commentators regard the monster sense of "Frankenstein" as well-established and not an error.

Modern practice varies somewhat. For example, in Dean Koontz's Frankenstein, first published in 2004, the creature is named "Deucalion", after the character from Greek mythology, who is the son of the Titan Prometheus, a reference to the original novel's title. Another example is the 2014 film I, Frankenstein, where the Queen of the Gargoyles Leonore gives him the name "Adam" after understanding Victor never gave him one. The creature is also referred to as Adam in the 2017 novel The Strange Case of the Alchemist's Daughter by Theodora Goss. In the second episode of Showtime's Penny Dreadful, also from 2014, Victor Frankenstein briefly considers naming his creation "Adam", before deciding instead to let the monster "pick his own name". Thumbing through a book of the works of William Shakespeare, the monster chooses "Proteus" from The Two Gentlemen of Verona. It is later revealed that Proteus is actually the second monster Frankenstein has created, with the first, abandoned creation having been named "Caliban", from The Tempest, by the theatre actor who took him in and later, after leaving the theatre, named himself after the English poet John Clare. Another example is an attempt by Randall Munroe of webcomic xkcd to make "Frankenstein" the canonical name of the monster, by publishing a short derivative version which directly states that it is. The 2004 film Van Helsing, a Universal production, depicts updated versions of some of its characters, including the Monster who is addressed directly by the title character as "Frankenstein".

In the 2026 film The Bride!, a remake of Bride of Frankenstein, the Monster is directly named Frankenstein (Frank for short).

== Shelley's plot ==
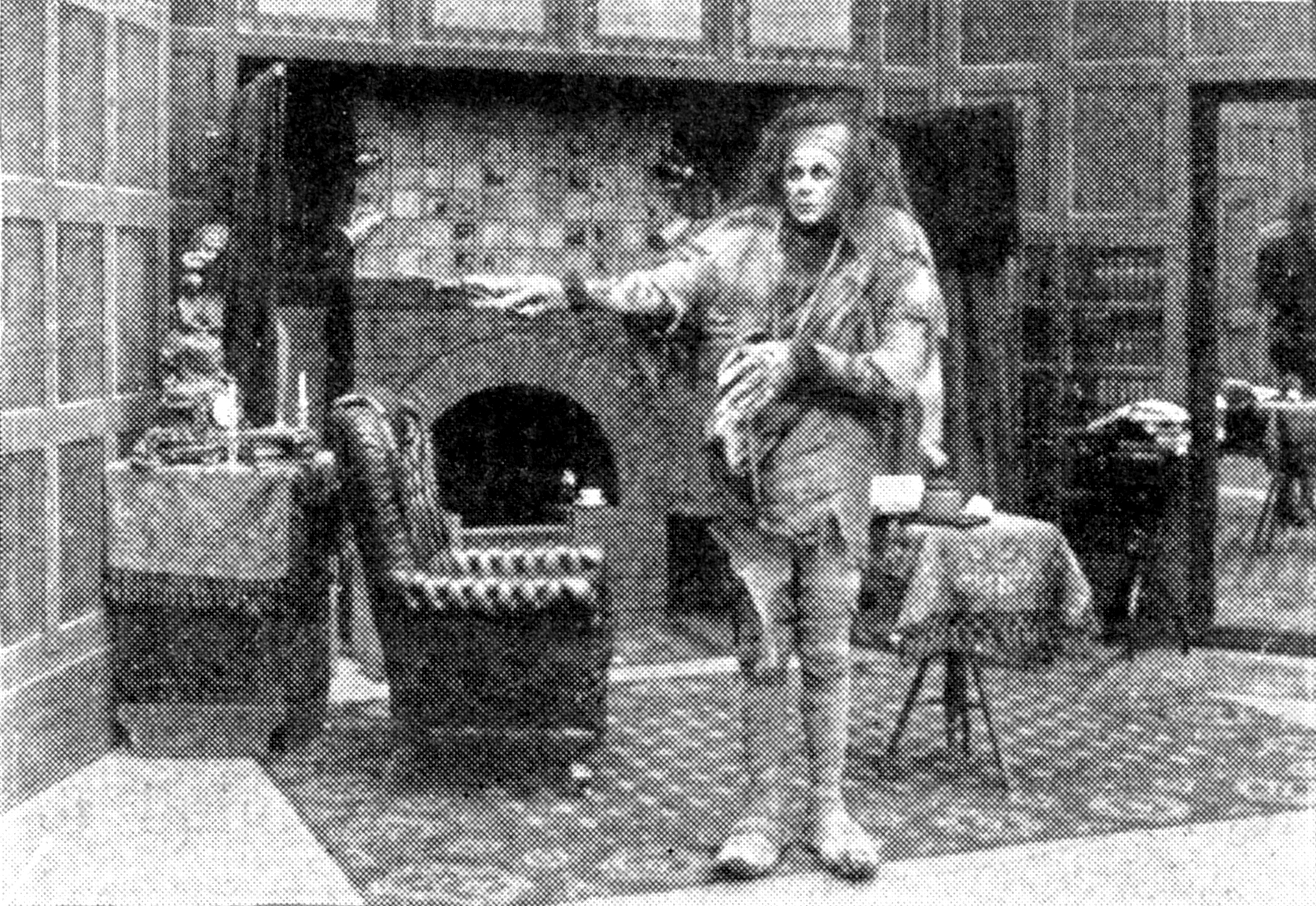
Charles Stanton Ogle in the Thomas Edison silent film Frankenstein (1910)

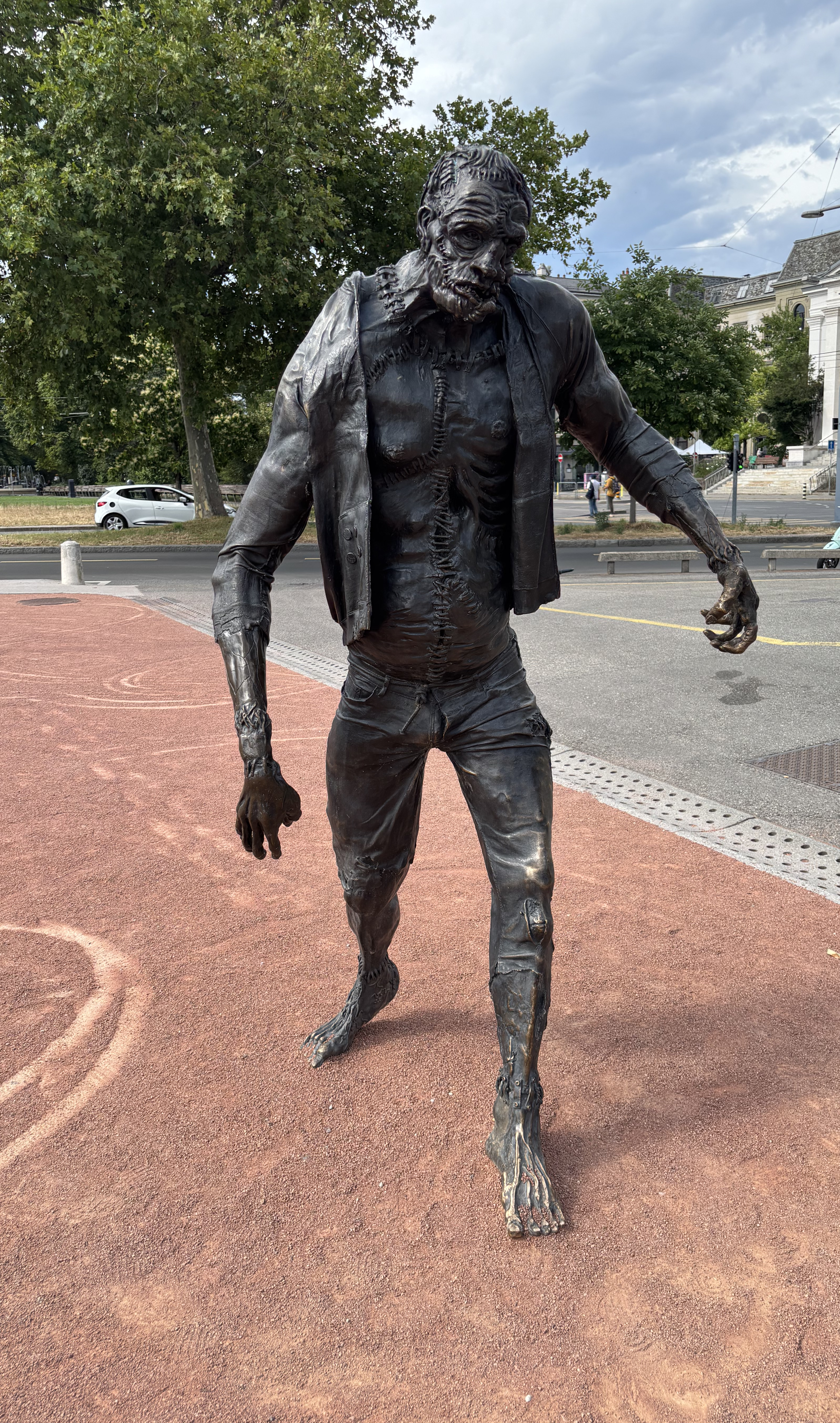
Statue showing a modern depiction of Frankenstein's monster in Geneva

Victor Frankenstein builds the creature over a two-year period in the attic of his boarding house in Ingolstadt after discovering a scientific principle which allows him to create life from non-living matter. Frankenstein is disgusted by his creation, however, and flees from it in horror. Frightened, and unaware of his own identity, the monster wanders through the wilderness.

He finds solace beside a remote cottage inhabited by an older, blind man and his two children. Eavesdropping, the creature familiarizes himself with their lives and learns to speak, whereby he becomes an eloquent, educated, and well-mannered individual. During this time, he also finds Frankenstein's journal in the pocket of the jacket he found in the laboratory and learns how he was created. The creature eventually introduces himself to the family's blind father, De Lacey, who treats him with kindness. When the rest of the family returns, however, they are frightened of him and drive him away. Enraged, the creature feels that humankind is his enemy and begins to hate his creator for abandoning him. Although he despises Frankenstein, he sets out to find him, believing that he is the only person who will help him. On his journey, the creature rescues a young girl from a river but is shot in the shoulder by the child's father, believing the creature intended to harm his child. Enraged by this final act of cruelty, the creature swears revenge on humankind for the suffering they have caused him. He seeks revenge against his creator in particular for leaving him alone in a world where he is hated. Using the information in Frankenstein's notes, the creature resolves to find him.

The monster kills Victor's younger brother William upon learning of the boy's relation to his creator and frames Justine Moritz, a young woman who lives with the Frankensteins, as the culprit (causing her execution afterwards). When Frankenstein retreats to the Alps, the monster approaches him at the summit, recounts his experiences, and asks his creator to build him a female mate. He promises, in return, to disappear with his mate and never trouble humankind again, but threatens to destroy everything Frankenstein holds dear should he fail or refuse. Frankenstein agrees, and eventually constructs a female creature on a remote island in Orkney, but aghast at the possibility of creating a race of monsters, destroys the female creature before it is complete. Horrified and enraged, the creature immediately appears, and gives Frankenstein a final threat: "I will be with you on your wedding night."

After leaving his creator, the creature goes on to kill Victor's best friend, Henry Clerval, and later kills Frankenstein's bride, Elizabeth Lavenza, on their wedding night, whereupon Frankenstein's father dies of grief. With nothing left to live for but revenge, Frankenstein dedicates himself to destroying his creation, and the creature goads him into pursuing him north, through Scandinavia and into Russia, staying ahead of him the entire way.

As they reach the Arctic Circle and travel over the pack ice of the Arctic Ocean, Frankenstein, suffering from severe exhaustion and hypothermia, comes within a mile of the creature, but is separated from him when the ice he is traveling over splits. A ship exploring the region encounters the dying Frankenstein, who relates his story to the ship's captain, Robert Walton. Later, the monster boards the ship, but upon finding Frankenstein dead, is overcome by grief and pledges to incinerate himself at "the Northernmost extremity of the globe". He then departs, never to be seen again.

== Appearance ==
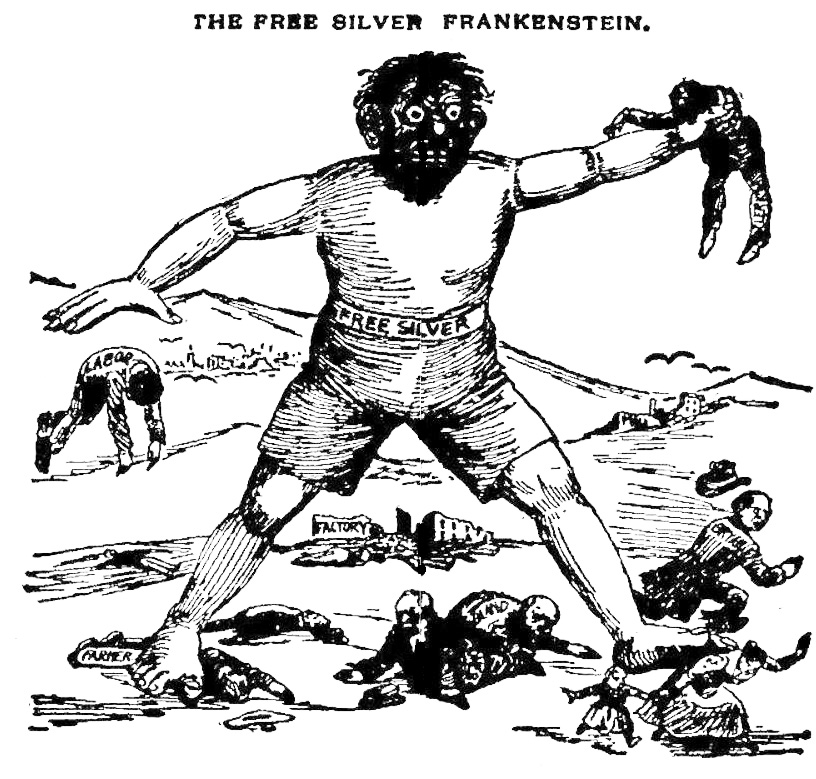
Frankenstein's monster in an editorial cartoon in the Fort Wayne Weekly Gazette, 1896, an allegory on the Silverite movement displacing other progressive factions in late 19th century U.S.

Shelley described Frankenstein's monster as an 8-foot-tall (2.4 m) creature of hideous contrasts:

His limbs were in proportion, and I had selected his features as beautiful. Beautiful! Great God! His yellow skin scarcely covered the work of muscles and arteries beneath; his hair was of a lustrous black, and flowing; his teeth of a pearly whiteness; but these luxuriances only formed a more horrid contrast with his watery eyes, that seemed almost of the same colour as the dun-white sockets in which they were set, his shrivelled complexion and straight black lips.

A picture of the creature appeared in the 1831 edition. Early stage portrayals dressed him in a toga, shaded, along with the monster's skin, a pale blue. Throughout the 19th century, the monster's image remained variable according to the artist.

=== Universal Pictures films ===
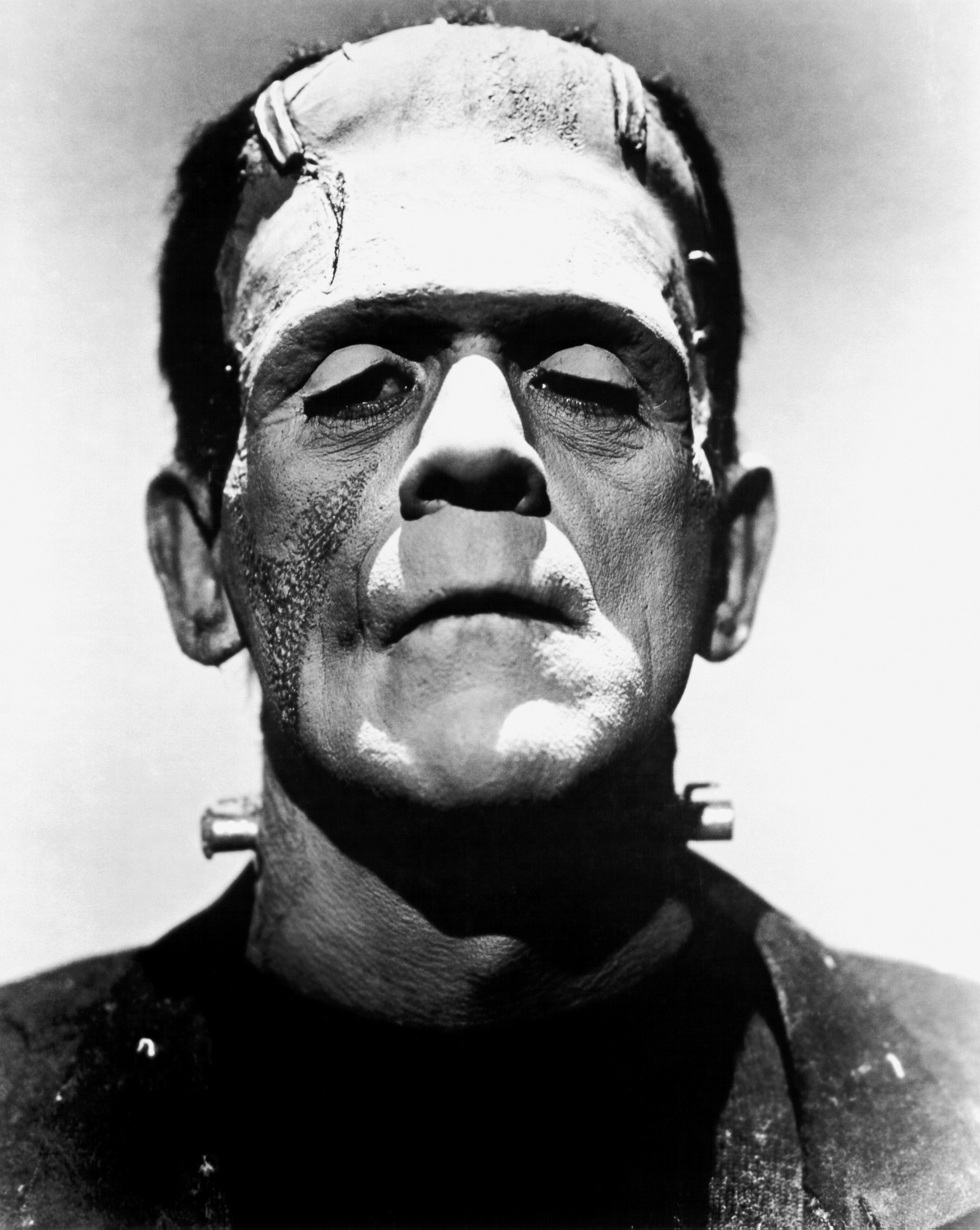
Boris Karloff in Bride of Frankenstein (1935) in a variation of the classic 1931 film version with an assist from make-up artist Jack Pierce. Karloff had gained weight since the original iteration and much of the monster's hair has been burned off to indicate having been caught in a fire. Some of the hair was gradually replaced during the course of the film to simulate it beginning to grow back.

The best-known image of Frankenstein's monster in popular culture derives from Boris Karloff's portrayal in the 1931 movie Frankenstein, in which he wore makeup applied and designed by Jack P. Pierce, who based the monster's face and iconic flat head shape on a drawing Pierce's daughter (whom Pierce feared to be psychic) had drawn from a dream. Universal Studios, which released the film, was quick to secure ownership of the copyright for the makeup format. Karloff played the monster in two more Universal films, Bride of Frankenstein and Son of Frankenstein; Lon Chaney Jr. took over the part from Karloff in The Ghost of Frankenstein; Bela Lugosi portrayed the role in Frankenstein Meets the Wolf Man; and Glenn Strange played the monster in the last three Universal Studios films to feature the character – House of Frankenstein, House of Dracula, and Abbott and Costello Meet Frankenstein. However, the makeup worn by subsequent actors replicated the iconic look first worn by Karloff. The image of Karloff's face is currently owned by his daughter's company, Karloff Enterprises, secured for her in a lawsuit for which she was represented by attorney Bela G. Lugosi (Bela Lugosi's son), after which Universal replaced Karloff's features with those of Glenn Strange in most of their marketing. In 1969, the New York Times mistakenly ran a photograph of Strange for Karloff's obituary.

Since Karloff's portrayal, the creature almost always appears as a towering, undead-like figure, often with a flat-topped angular head and bolts on his neck to serve as electrical connectors or grotesque electrodes. He wears a dark, usually tattered, suit having shortened coat sleeves and thick, heavy boots, causing him to walk with an awkward, stiff-legged gait (as opposed to the novel, in which he is described as much more flexible than a human). The tone of his skin varies (although shades of green or gray are common), and his body appears stitched together at certain parts (such as around the neck and joints). This image has influenced the creation of other fictional characters, such as the Hulk.

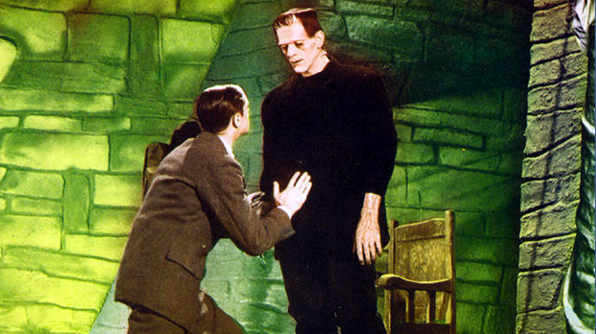
Colin Clive and Karloff in Frankenstein (1931)

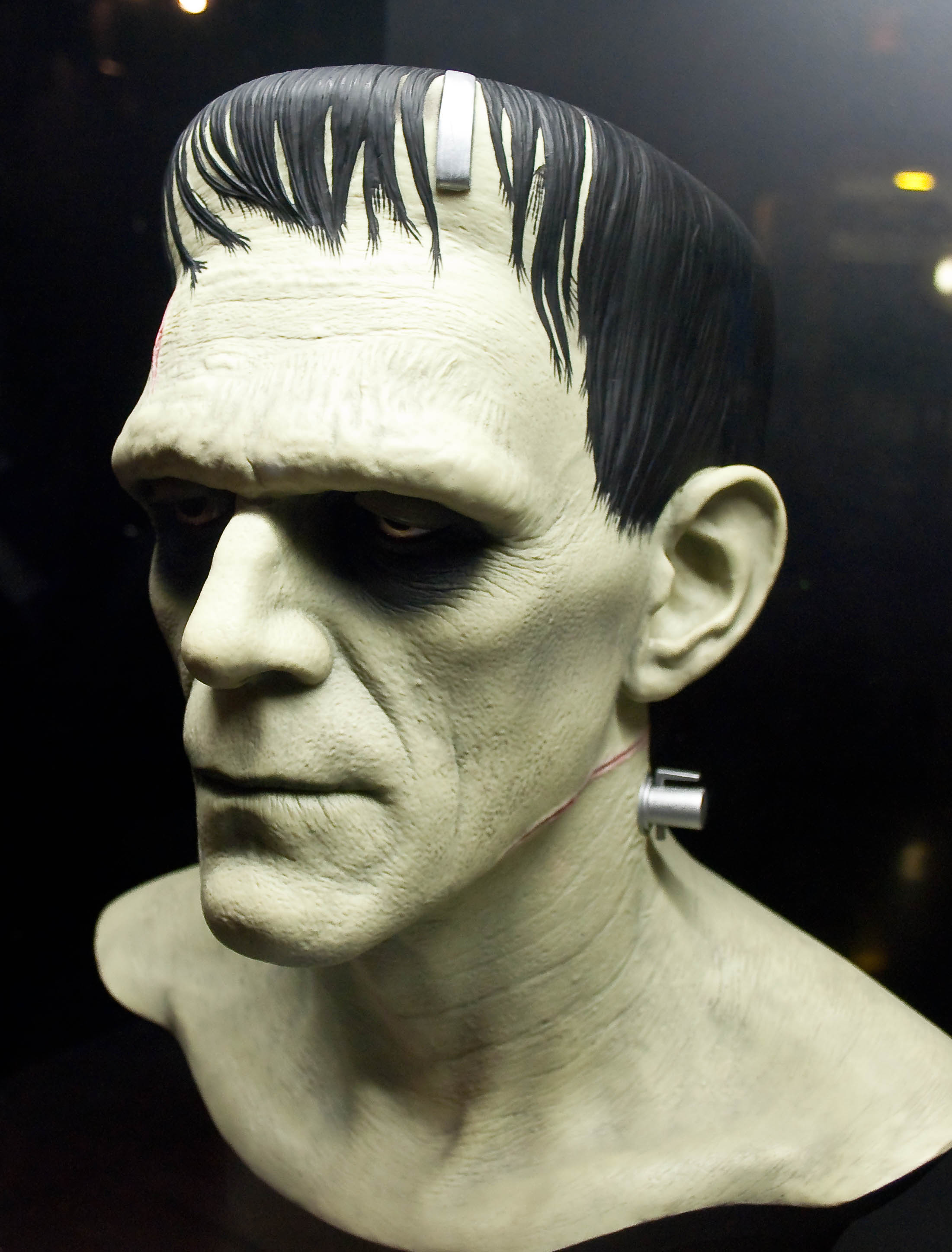
Frankenstein's monster's bust, based on Boris Karloff, in the National Museum of Cinema of Turin, Italy

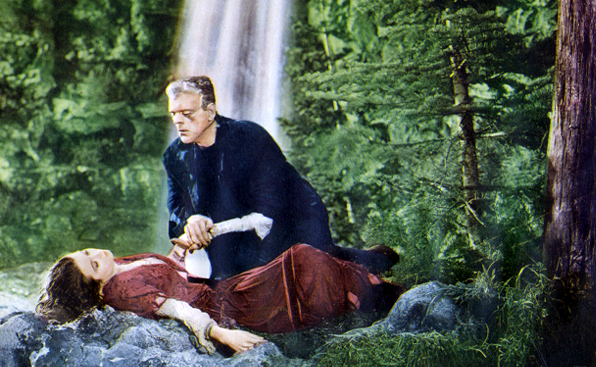
Colored publicity shot of Bride of Frankenstein (1935).

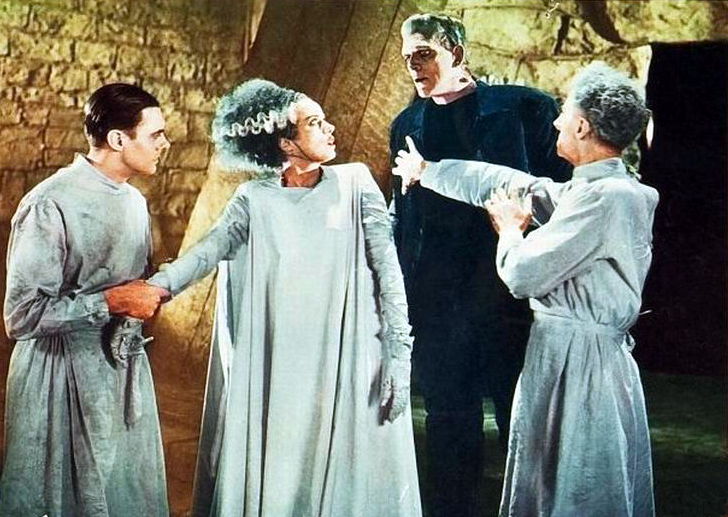
Another colored publicity shot of Bride of Frankenstein (1935).

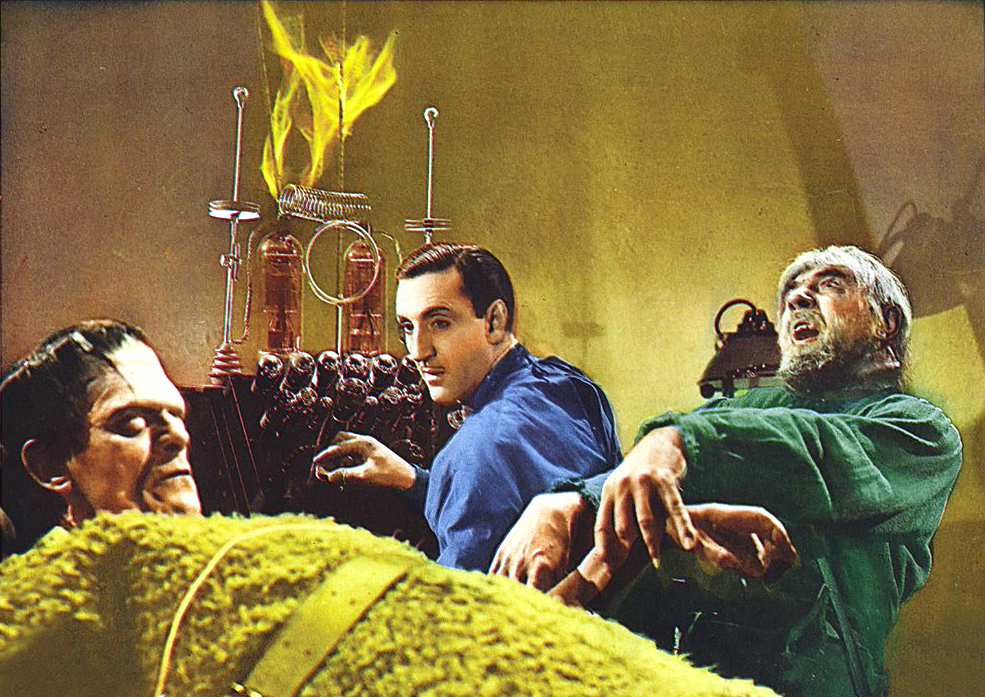
Colored publicity shot of Son of Frankenstein (1939).

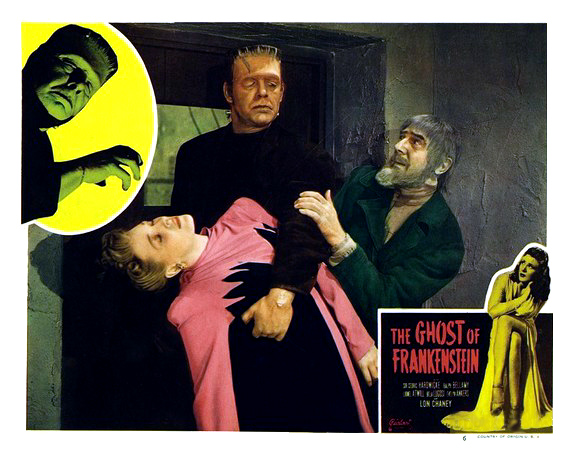
Evelyn Ankers, Lon Chaney Jr. as the monster and Bela Lugosi as Ygor in The Ghost of Frankenstein (1942)

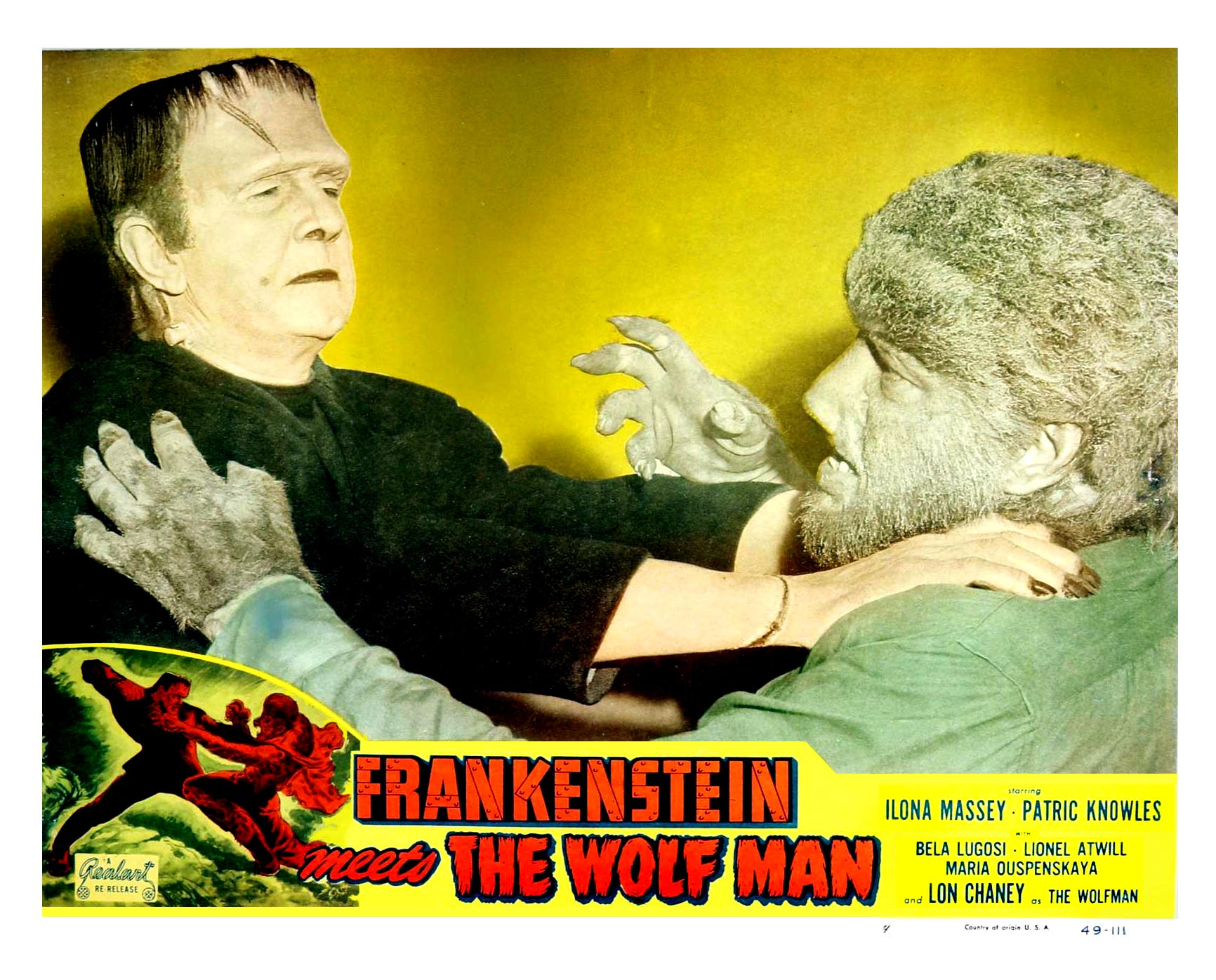
Re-release lobby card for Frankenstein Meets the Wolf Man (1943) with Bela Lugosi and Lon Chaney Jr.

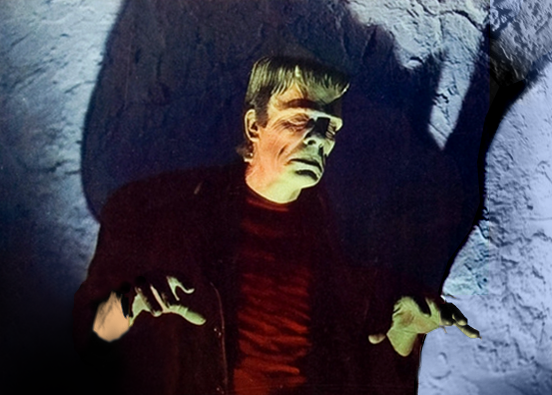
Glenn Strange as the monster in House of Dracula (1945)

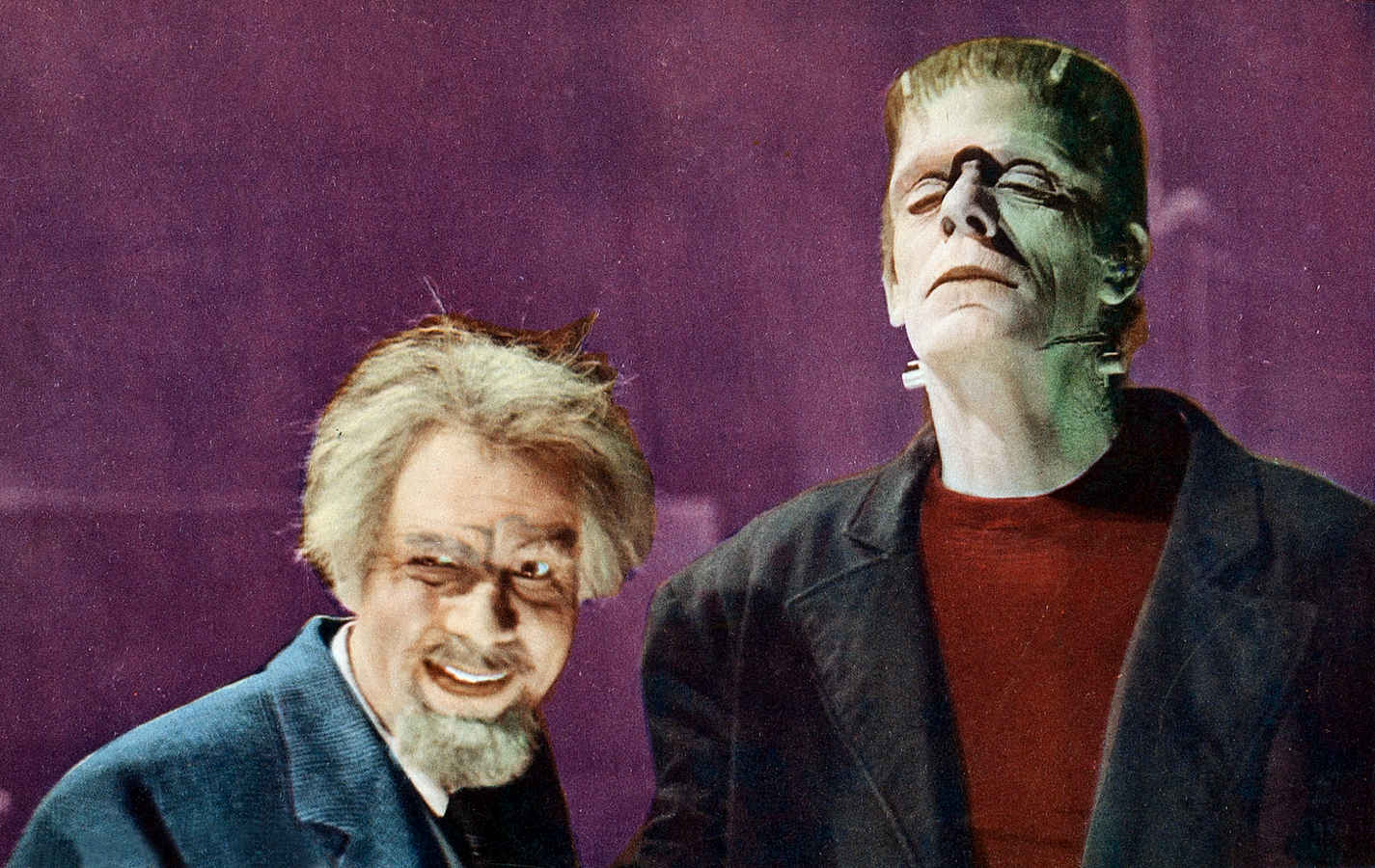
Onslow Stevens and Glenn Strange in House of Dracula (1945)

=== Hammer Films Productions version ===
In the 1957 film The Curse of Frankenstein, Christopher Lee was cast as the creature. The producers Hammer Film Productions refrained from duplicating aspects of Universal's 1931 film, and so Phil Leakey designed a new look for the creature bearing no resemblance to the Boris Karloff design created by Jack Pierce. For his performance as the creature Lee played him as a loose-limbed and childlike, fearful and lonely, with a suggestion of being in pain. Author Paul Leggett describes the creature as being like an abused child; afraid but also violently angry. Christopher Lee was annoyed on getting the script and discovering that the monster had no dialogue, for this creature was totally mute. According to Marcus K. Harmes in contrasting Lee's creature with the one played by Karloff, "Lee's actions as the monster seem more directly evil, to judge from the expression on his face when he bears down on the helpless old blind man but these are explained in the film as psychopathic impulses caused by brain damage, not the cunning of the literary monster. Lee also evokes considerable pathos in his performance." In this film the aggressive and childish demeanour of the monster are in contrast with that of the murdered Professor Bernstein, once the "finest brain in Europe", from whom the creature's now damaged brain was taken.

The sequels to The Curse of Frankenstein would feature Victor Frankenstein creating various different Frankenstein monsters, none of which would be played by Christopher Lee:

- The film The Revenge of Frankenstein has Victor Frankenstein placing the brain of a hunchback named Karl (portrayed by Oscar Quitak) into a makeshift body (portrayed by Michael Gwynn). Though the procedure works, Karl starts to redevelop his deformities and later dies in front of Victor.
- The film The Evil of Frankenstein reveals that Victor Frankenstein had made a prototype version of his monster which was kept in a frozen cave. This version sported a square forehead. After being thawed out and reanimated, the Monster (portrayed by Kiwi Kingston) has his brain awakened by a hypnotist named Zoltan (portrayed by Peter Woodthorpe). When Frankenstein's lab was destroyed, it apparently killed Victor and the Monster.
- The film Frankenstein Created Woman has Victor Frankenstein surviving the lab's destruction and making a female monster from the remains of a cowardly innkeeper's half-disfigured daughter Christina Kleve (portrayed by Susan Denberg) after she threw herself in the river following the death of Victor's ally Hans. He and Dr. Hertz transferred Hans' soul into Christina's body causing her to become possessed by him. After coming to her senses, Christina commits suicide by drowning herself in the river.
- The film Frankenstein Must Be Destroyed has Victor Frankenstein making a monster out of the remains of the asylum's administrator Professor Richter (portrayed by Freddie Jones) that involves placing the brain of Victor's former assistant Dr. Frederick Brant (portrayed by George Pravda) into Professor Richter's body. The Monster later drags Victor into the burning house.
- The film Frankenstein and the Monster from Hell has Victor surviving the fire and making a monster from the hulking ape-like asylum inmate Herr Schneider (portrayed by David Prowse) who died from suicide. Victor gives Her Schneider's body a new brain and eyes from the late asylum inmate Professor Durendal and the hands of a sculptor inmate named Tarmut before reanimating him. During its plans for revenge, the Monster is killed by a mob of asylum inmates.
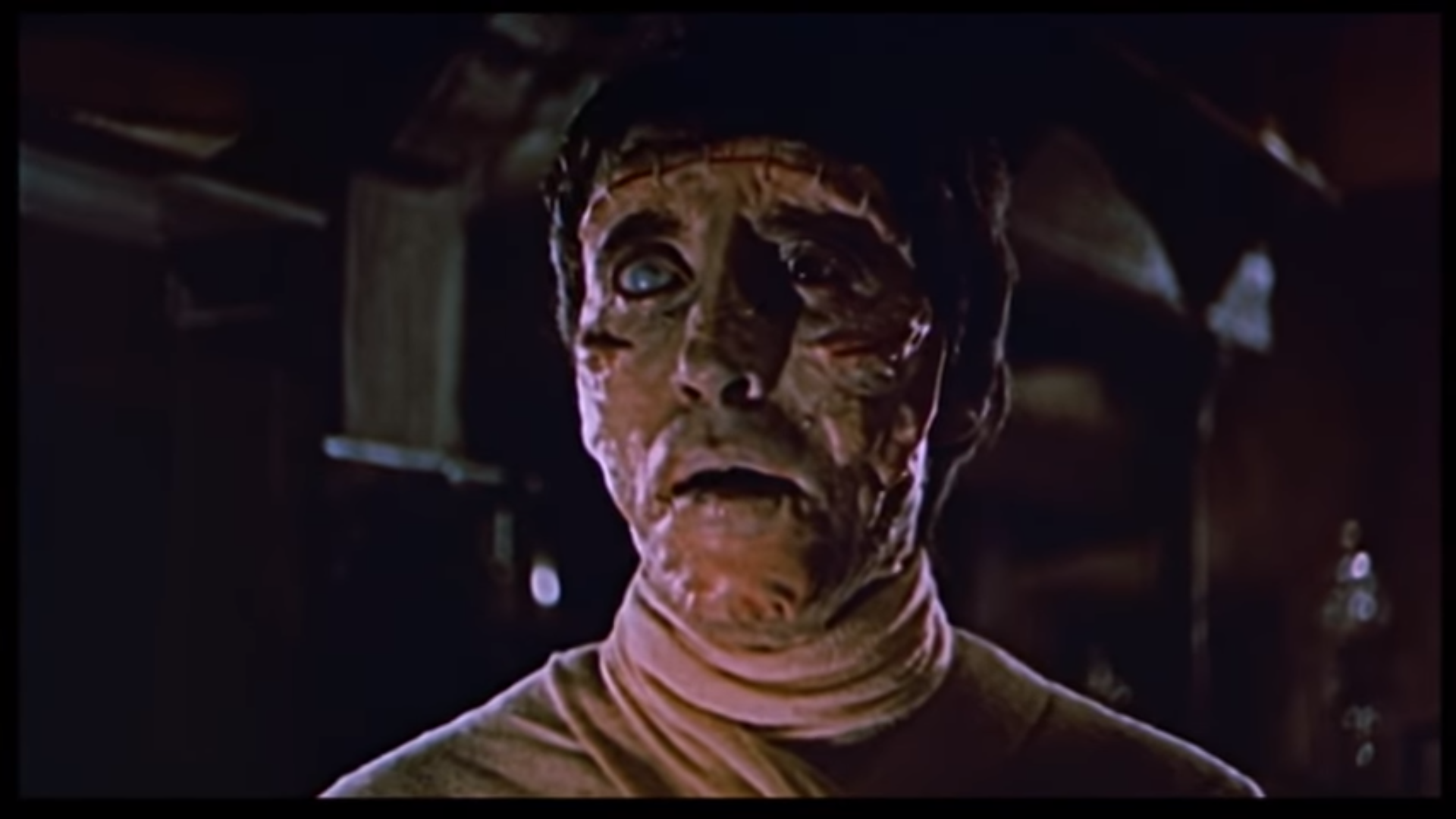
Christopher Lee as the creature in The Curse of Frankenstein (1957)

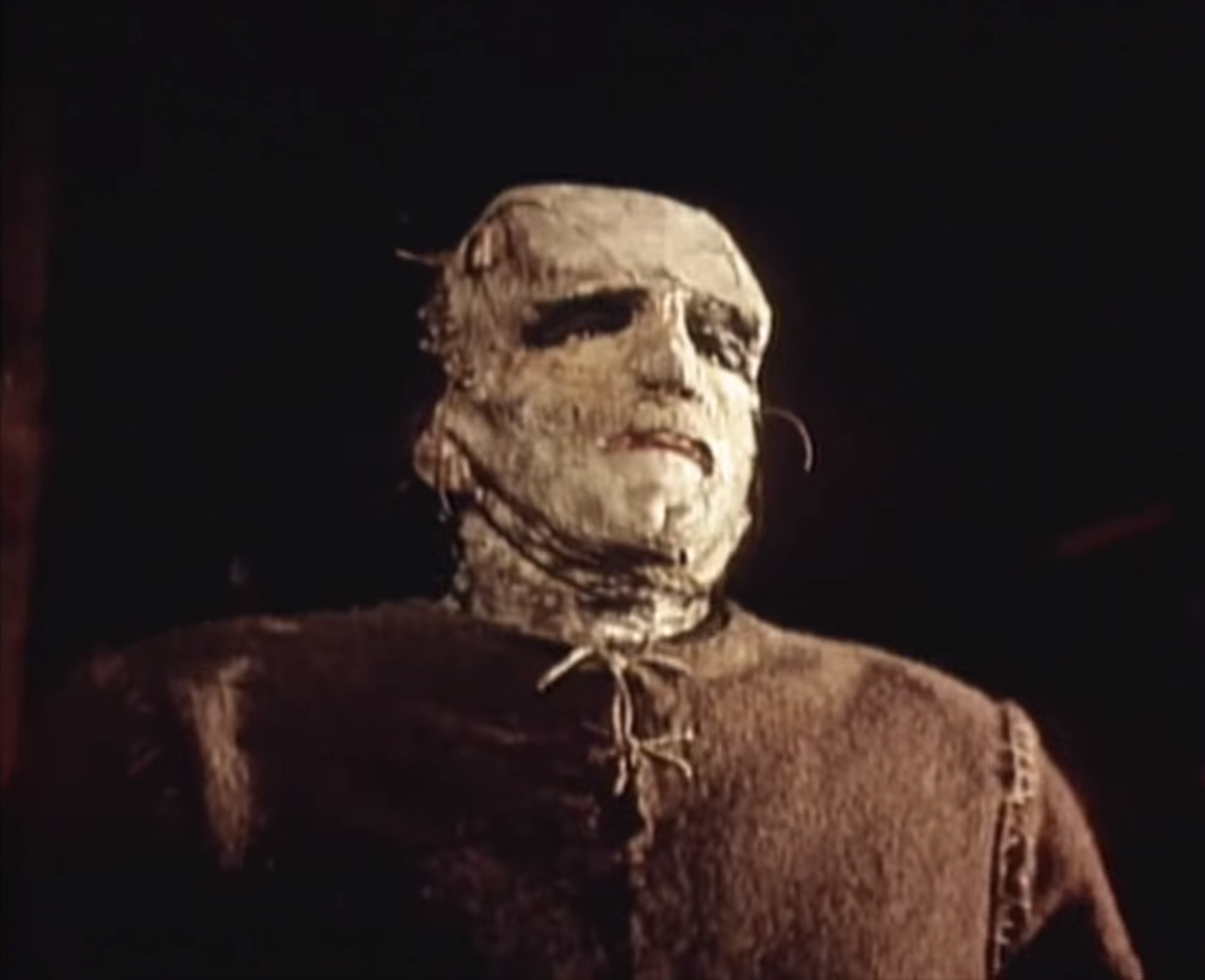
Kiwi Kingston as a Frankenstein's monster in The Evil of Frankenstein (1964)

=== Toho versions ===
In the 1965 Toho film Frankenstein vs. Baragon, the heart of Frankenstein's monster was transported from Germany to Hiroshima as World War II neared its end, only to be irradiated during the atomic bombing of the city, granting it miraculous regenerative capabilities. Over the ensuing 20 years, it grows into a complete human child, who then rapidly matures into a giant, 20-metre-tall man after he is rediscovered. Frankenstein escapes a laboratory in the city after being agitated by news reporters using flash photography on him, and goes to fend for himself in the countryside, only to be accused of attacking villages and killing people, actually the victims of the underground monster Baragon. The two monsters face off in a showdown that ends with Frankenstein's monster victorious, though he falls into the depths of the Earth after the ground collapses beneath his feet.

The film's sequel The War of the Gargantuas would see cell samples of Frankenstein's monster regenerate into the titular Gargantuas, two hairy Frankenstein's monster-like giants consisting of the malicious green sea monster Gaira and the friendly brown mountain monster Sanda. Sanda was grown from the leftover cell tissue on the Earth's surface while Gaira was grown from Sanda's tissue that washed out into the ocean and fed off of some of the plankton. Gaira and Sanda later appeared in the series Ike! Godman and the IDW Publishing comic Godzilla: Rulers of Earth.

=== Other film versions ===
In the 1958 movie Frankenstein 1970, the monster (performed by Mike Lane) was put together by Victor Frakenstein using an atomic reactor, the brain of his butler Schutter and the eyes of his finance-handling friend William Gottfried. When the bandaged monster was finally completed, it turned on Victor where it accidentally unleashed a radioactive steam that killed both of them. Once the radiation levels are down, the police and film director Doug remove the monster's bandages to see that its face resembled Victor's face prior to his torture at the hands of the Nazi Party.

In the 1973 TV miniseries Frankenstein: The True Story, in which the creature is played by Michael Sarrazin, he appears as a strikingly handsome man who later degenerates into a grotesque monster due to a flaw in the creation process.

In the 1977 film Terror of Frankenstein (also released under the title Victor Frankenstein), "the Monster" is played by Per Oscarsson. This adaptation closely resembles the creature as described in the novel, both intelligent and articulate, but with dark blond hair and black lips.

In the 1994 film Mary Shelley's Frankenstein, the creature is played by Robert De Niro and has an appearance closer to that described in the original novel, though this version of the creature possesses balding grey hair and a body covered in bloody stitches. He is, as in the novel, motivated by pain and loneliness. In this version, Frankenstein gives the monster the brain of his mentor, Doctor Waldman, while his body is made from a man who killed Waldman while resisting a vaccination. The monster retains Waldman's "trace memories" that apparently help him quickly learn to speak and read.

In the 2004 film Van Helsing, the monster is shown in a modernized version of the Karloff design. He is 8 to 9 feet (240–270 cm) tall, has a square bald head, gruesome scars, and pale green skin. The electrical origin of the creature is emphasized with one electrified dome in the back of his head and another over his heart, and he also has hydraulic pistons in his legs, with the design being similar to that of a steam-punk cyborg. Although not as eloquent as in the novel, this version of the creature is intelligent and relatively nonviolent.

In 2004, a TV miniseries adaptation of Frankenstein was made by Hallmark. Luke Goss plays the creature. This adaptation more closely resembles the monster as described in the novel: intelligent and articulate, with flowing, dark hair and watery eyes.

The 2005 film Frankenstein Reborn portrays the creature as a paraplegic man who tries to regain the ability to walk by having a nanobots surging through his body but has side effects. Instead, the surgeon kills him and resurrects his corpse as a reanimated zombie-like creature. This version of the creature has stitches on his face where he was shot, strains of brown hair, black pants, a dark hoodie, and a black jacket with a brown fur collar.

Frankenstein's monster appears in the Sony Pictures Animation film series, Hotel Transylvania, voiced by Kevin James in the first three films and Brad Abrell in 2022's Hotel Transylvania: Transformania. The character, commonly referred to as Frank, is Count "Drac" Dracula's best friend who acts as an uncle to Drac's daughter, Mavis. He also regularly hangs out with Drac's other best friends, notably Murray (voiced by CeeLo Green in the first film and Keegan-Michael Key in the sequels), and is married to the series' portrayal of The Bride named Eunice (voiced by Fran Drescher).

The 2014 TV series Penny Dreadful also rejects the Karloff design in favour of Shelley's description. This version of the creature has the flowing dark hair described by Shelley, although he departs from her description by having pale grey skin and obvious scars along the right side of his face. Additionally, he is of average height, being even shorter than other characters in the series. In this series, the monster names himself "Caliban", after the character in William Shakespeare's The Tempest. In the series, Victor Frankenstein makes a second and third creature, each more indistinguishable from normal human beings.

Frankenstein's monster appears in the Reiwa era film The Great Yokai War: Guardians.

The 2024 film Monster Mash by The Asylum features a Frankenstein's monster variant called Boris (portrayed by Erik Celso Mann).

In the 2025 version of the film by director Guillermo del Toro, the monster as portrayed by Jacob Elordi retains some elements of Shelley's novel and later interpretations (mainly physical aspects), but diverges significantly in new ways. A stitched-together look, watery eyes, and imposing size are familiar, but del Toro's version of the creature is implied to be immortal, with its wounds self-healing even when exposed to bullets or a stick of dynamite. Also noted by many critics was the focus on the inner emotions and intellectual development of the creature. Unlike some previous portrayals that depict the creature as brutish, Elordi's performance is more graceful, childlike, and reveals the deep loneliness and pain of the creature once it learns to speak, read, and therefore understand its true origins and nature.

The 2026 film The Bride! sees Frankenstein's monster (portrayed by Christian Bale) surviving into the 1930s.

== Personality ==
=== In the novel ===
As depicted by Shelley, the creature is a sensitive, emotional person whose only aim is to share his life with another sentient being like himself. The novel portrayed him as versed in Paradise Lost, Plutarch's Lives, and The Sorrows of Young Werther, books he finds after having learnt language.

From the beginning, the creature is rejected by everyone he meets. He realizes from the moment of his "birth" that even his own creator cannot stand the sight of him; this is obvious when Frankenstein says "…one hand was stretched out, seemingly to detain me, but I escaped…". Upon seeing his own reflection, he realizes that he too is repulsed by his appearance. His greatest desire is to find love and acceptance; but when that desire is denied, he swears revenge on his creator.

The creature is a vegetarian. While speaking to Frankenstein, he tells him, "My food is not that of man; I do not destroy the lamb and the kid to glut my appetite; acorns and berries afford me sufficient nourishment...The picture I present to you is peaceful and human." At the time the novel was written, many writers, including Percy Shelley in his 1813 A Vindication of Natural Diet, argued that practicing vegetarianism was the morally right thing to do.

Contrary to many film versions, the creature in the novel is very articulate and eloquent in his speech. Almost immediately after his creation, he dresses himself; and within 11 months, he can speak and read German and French. By the end of the novel, the creature is able to speak English fluently as well.

=== In adaptations ===
In the 1931 film adaptation, the creature is depicted as mute and bestial; it is implied that this is because he is accidentally implanted with a criminal's "abnormal" brain. In the subsequent sequel, Bride of Frankenstein, the creature learns to speak, albeit in short, stunted sentences. However, his intelligence is implied to be fairly developed, since what little dialogue he speaks suggests he has a world-weary attitude to life, and a deep understanding of his unnatural state. When rejected by his bride, he briefly goes through a suicidal state and attempts suicide, blowing up the laboratory he is in. In the second sequel, Son of Frankenstein, the creature is again rendered inarticulate. Following a brain transplant in the third sequel, The Ghost of Frankenstein, the creature speaks with the voice and personality of the brain donor. This was continued after a fashion in the scripting for the fourth sequel, Frankenstein Meets the Wolf Man, but the dialogue was excised before release. The creature was effectively mute in later sequels, although he refers to Count Dracula as his "master" in Abbott and Costello Meet Frankenstein. The creature is often portrayed as being afraid of fire, although he is not afraid of it in the novel.

The 2004 film Van Helsing and 2014 television series Penny Dreadful depict the character more closely to the literary original, although the latter version is the only one to retain the character's violent reactions to rejection.

== Interpretations ==
=== The monster as a metaphor ===
Scholars sometimes look for deeper meaning in Shelley's story, and have drawn an analogy between the monster and a motherless child; Shelley's own mother died while giving birth to her. The monster has also been analogized to an oppressed class; Shelley wrote that the monster recognized "the division of property, of immense wealth and squalid poverty". Others see in the monster the dangers of uncontrolled scientific progress, especially as at the time of publishing; Galvanism had convinced many scientists that raising the dead through use of electrical currents was a scientific possibility.

Another proposal is that Victor Frankenstein was based on a real scientist who had a similar name, and who had been called a modern Prometheus – Benjamin Franklin. Accordingly, the monster would represent the new nation that Franklin helped to create out of remnants left by England. Victor Frankenstein's father "made also a kite, with a wire and string, which drew down that fluid from the clouds," wrote Shelley, similar to Franklin's famous kite experiment.

Nick Groom considers adaptations of the story to have "become more and more warped" over time, with Frankenstein's creation becoming a mindless zombie, without any thought, any soul; an unredeemable, intolerable, and indubitably unjustifiable monster.

=== Racial interpretations ===
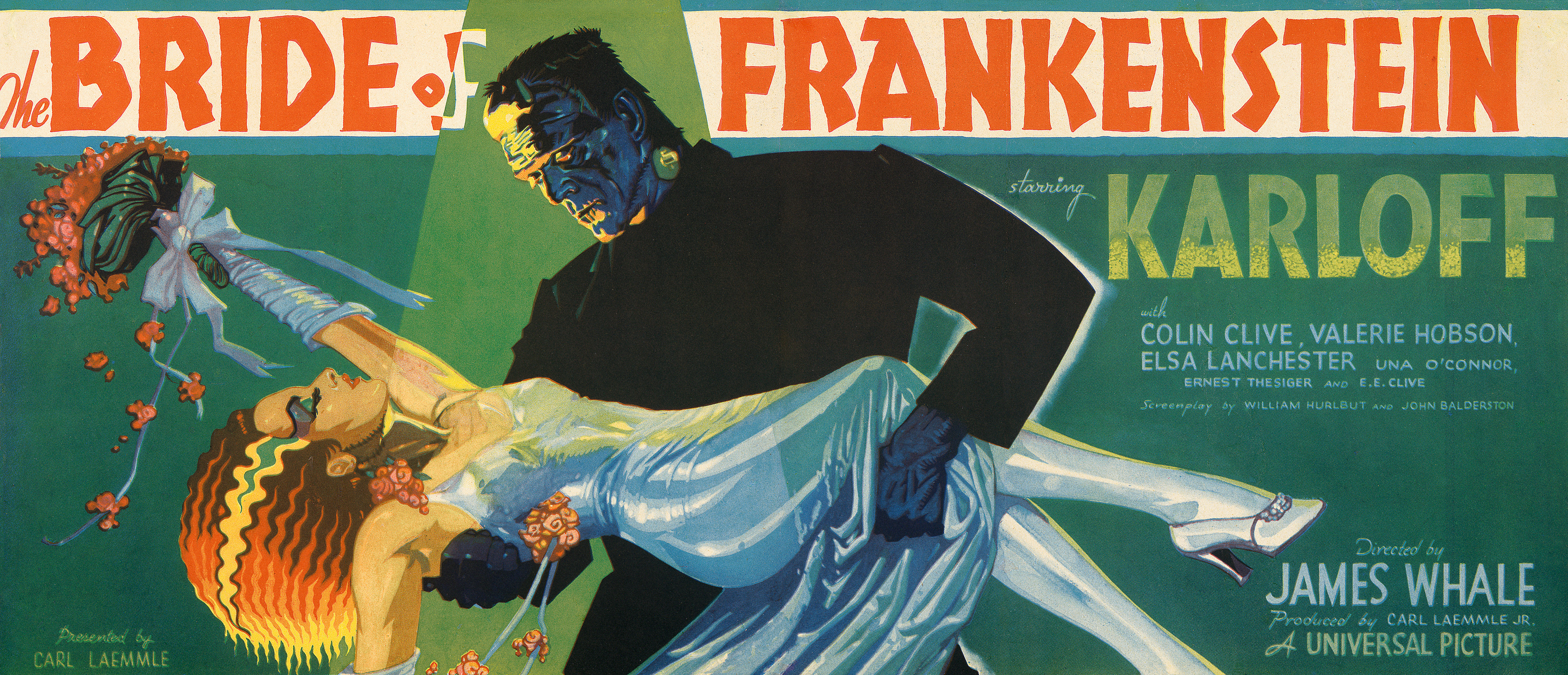
1930s Universal's art director Karoly Grosz (illustrator) designed this offbeat 1935 advertisement

In discussing the physical description of the monster, there has been some speculation that his design may be rooted in common perceptions of race during the 18th century. Three scholars have noted that Shelley's description of the monster seems to be racially coded; one argues that, "Shelley's portrayal of her monster drew upon contemporary attitudes towards non-whites, in particular on fears and hopes of the abolition of slavery in the West Indies."

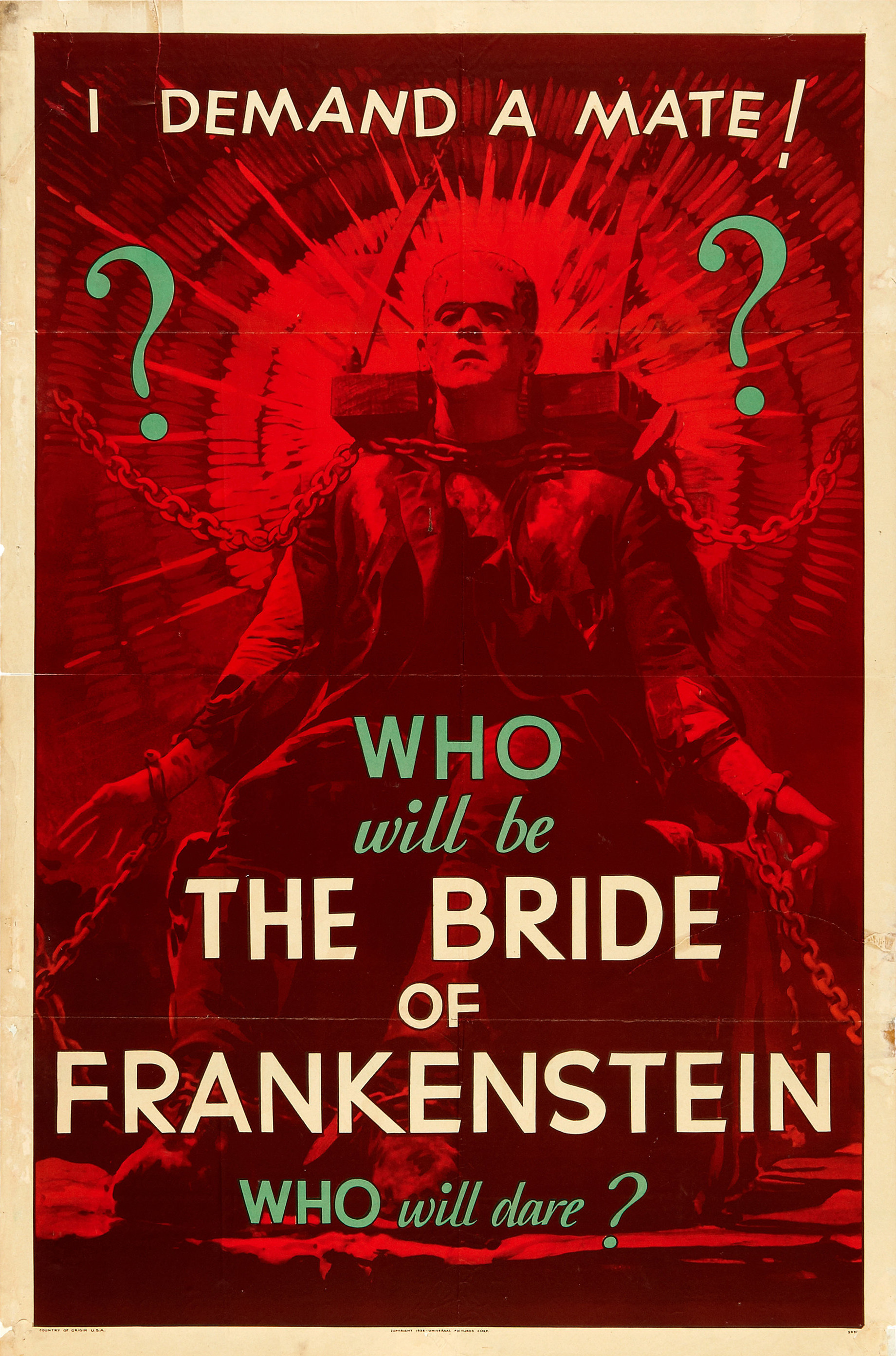
Karloff in 1935 teaser ad

In her article "Frankenstein, Racial Science, and the Yellow Peril", Anne Mellor claims that the monster's features share a lot in common with the Mongoloid race. This term, now out of fashion and carrying some negative connotations, is used to describe the "yellow" races of Asia as distinct from the Caucasian or white races. To support her claim, Mellor points out that both Mary and Percy Shelley were friends with William Lawrence, an early proponent of racial science and someone whom Mary "continued to consult on medical matters and [met with] socially until his death in 1830."

While Mellor points out to allusions to Orientalism and the Yellow Peril, John Malchow in his article "Frankenstein's Monster and Images of Race in Nineteenth-Century Britain" explores the possibility of the monster either being intentionally or unintentionally coded as black. Malchow argues that the monster's depiction is based in an 18th-century understanding of "popular racial discourse [which] managed to conflate such descriptions of particular ethnic characteristics into a general image of the 'Negro' body in which repulsive features, brute-like strength and size of limbs featured prominently." Malchow makes it clear that it is difficult to tell if this alleged racial allegory was intentional on Shelley's part or if it was inspired by the society she lived in (or if it exists in the text at all outside of his interpretation), and he states that "There is no clear proof that Mary Shelley consciously set out to create a monster which suggested, explicitly, the Jamaican escaped slave or maroon, or that she drew directly from any person knowledge of either planter or abolitionist propaganda." In addition to the previous interpretations, Karen Lynnea Piper argues in her article, "Inuit Diasporas: Frankenstein and the Inuit in England" that the symbolism surrounding Frankenstein's monster could stem from the Inuit of the Arctic. Piper argues that the monster accounts for the "missing presence" of any indigenous people during Waldon's expedition, and that he represents the fear of the savage, lurking on the outskirts of civilization.

== Portrayals ==
Actor	Year	Production
Thomas Cooke	1823	Presumption; or, the Fate of Frankenstein (stage play)
O. Smith	1826	The Man and The Monster; or The Fate of Frankenstein (stage play)
Charles Stanton Ogle	1910	Frankenstein
Percy Standing	1915	Life Without Soul
Umberto Guarracino	1920	The Monster of Frankenstein
Boris Karloff	1931	Frankenstein
Boris Karloff	1935	Bride of Frankenstein
Boris Karloff	1939	Son of Frankenstein
Boris Karloff	1962	Route 66': "Lizard's Leg and Owlet's Wing" (TV series episode)
Joel Ashley	1939	Frankenstein (stage play)
Dale Van Sickel	1941	Hellzapoppin
Lon Chaney Jr.	1942	The Ghost of Frankenstein
Lon Chaney Jr.	1952	Tales of Tomorrow: "Frankenstein" (TV series episode)
Bela Lugosi	1943	Frankenstein Meets the Wolf Man
Glenn Strange	1944	The House of Frankenstein
Glenn Strange	1945	House of Dracula
Glenn Strange	1948	Abbott and Costello Meet Frankenstein
Gary Conway	1957	I Was a Teenage Frankenstein
Christopher Lee	1957	The Curse of Frankenstein
Gary Conway	1958	How to Make a Monster
Michael Gwynn	1958	The Revenge of Frankenstein
Mike Lane	1958	Frankenstein 1970
Harry Wilson	1958	Frankenstein's Daughter
Don Megowan	1958	Tales of Frankenstein (TV pilot)
Danny Dayton	1963	Mack and Myer for Hire: "Monstrous Merriment" (TV series episode)
Kiwi Kingston	1964	The Evil of Frankenstein
Fred Gwynne	1964	The Munsters (as "Herman Munster")
Koji Furuhata	1965	Frankenstein vs. Baragon
John Maxim	1965	Doctor Who: "The Chase" (TV series episode)
Robert Reilly	1965	Frankenstein Meets the Space Monster
Yû Sekida and Haruo Nakajima	1966	The War of the Gargantuas
Allen Swift	1967	Mad Monster Party?
Allen Swift	1972	Mad Mad Mad Monsters
Susan Denberg	1967	Frankenstein Created Woman
Robert Rodan	1967	Dark Shadows
David Prowse	1967	Casino Royale
David Prowse	1970	The Horror of Frankenstein
David Prowse	1974	Frankenstein and the Monster from Hell
Freddie Jones	1969	Frankenstein Must Be Destroyed
Manuel Leal	1969	Santo y Blue Demon contra los monstruos (as "Franquestain")
Howard Morris	1970	Groovie Goolies (as "Frankie")
John Bloom and Shelley Weiss	1971	Dracula vs. Frankenstein
Xiro Papas	1972	Frankenstein 80
Bo Svenson	1973	The Wide World of Mystery "Frankenstein" (TV series episode)
José Villasante	1973	The Spirit of the Beehive
Michael Sarrazin	1973	Frankenstein: The True Story
Srdjan Zelenovic	1974	Flesh for Frankenstein
Peter Boyle	1974	Young Frankenstein
Mike Lane	1976	Monster Squad
Per Oscarsson	1977	Terror of Frankenstein
Jack Elam	1979	Struck by Lightning
John Schuck	1979	The Halloween That Almost Wasn't
Peter Cullen	1984	The Transformers
David Warner	1984	Frankenstein (TV movie)
Clancy Brown	1985	The Bride
Clancy Brown	2020	DuckTales
Clive Russell	1986	The True Story of Frankenstein (TV Documentary)
Tom Noonan	1987	The Monster Squad
Paul Naschy	1987	El Aullido del Diablo
Chris Sarandon	1987	Frankenstein (TV movie)
Phil Hartman	1987–1996	Saturday Night Live
Zale Kessler	1988	Scooby-Doo and the Ghoul School
Jim Cummings	1988	Scooby-Doo! and the Reluctant Werewolf
Craig Armstrong	1989	The Super Mario Bros. Super Show!
Nick Brimble	1990	Frankenstein Unbound
Randy Quaid	1992	Frankenstein
Maroshi Tamura	1992	Kyōryū Sentai Zyuranger (as "Dora Franke"; footage reused for Mighty Morphin Power Rangers in 1993, with voice dubbed by Tom Wyner)
Robert De Niro	1994	Mary Shelley's Frankenstein
Deron McBee	1995	Monster Mash: The Movie
Peter Crombie	1997	House of Frankenstein
Thomas Wellington	1997	The Creeps
Frank Welker	1999	Alvin and the Chipmunks Meet Frankenstein
Shuler Hensley	2004	Van Helsing
Luke Goss	2004	Frankenstein
Vincent Perez	2004	Frankenstein
Joel Hebner	2005	Frankenstein Reborn
Julian Bleach	2007	Frankenstein
Shuler Hensley	2007	Young Frankenstein
Scott Adsit	2010	Mary Shelley's Frankenhole
Benedict Cumberbatch	2011	Frankenstein
Jonny Lee Miller	2011	Frankenstein
Tim Krueger	2011	Frankenstein: Day of the Beast
David Harewood	2011	Frankenstein's Wedding
Kevin James	2012	Hotel Transylvania
Kevin James	2015	Hotel Transylvania 2
Kevin James	2018	Hotel Transylvania 3: Summer Vacation
David Gest	2012	A Nightmare on Lime Street
Mark Hamill	2012	Uncle Grandpa
Roger Morrissey	2013	The Frankenstein Theory
Chad Michael Collins	2013	Once Upon a Time
Aaron Eckhart	2014	I, Frankenstein
Eric Gesecus	2014	Army of Frankensteins
Rory Kinnear	2014	Penny Dreadful
Dee Bradley Baker	2014	Winx Club (in "A Monstrous Crush")
Michael Gladis	2015	The Librarians (in "And the Broken Staff")
Spencer Wilding and Guillaume Delaunay (Note: This version of Frankenstein's monster was a prototype that was nicknamed "Prometheus" which took two actors to physically perform.)	2015	Victor Frankenstein
Xavier Samuel	2015	Frankenstein
Kevin Michael Richardson	2015	Rick and Morty
Takayuki Sugō (original Japanese version); R. Bruce Elliott (English dub)	2015	The Empire of Corpses (as "The One")
Brad Garrett	2016	Apple holiday commercial
John DeSantis	2017	Escape from Mr. Lemoncello's Library
Ai Nonaka (original Japanese version); Sarah Anne Williams (English dub)	2017	Fate/Apocrypha
Grant Moninger	2017	Teenage Mutant Ninja Turtles
Skylar Astin	2019	Vampirina
Will Ferrell	2019	Drunk History
Brad Abrell	2022	Hotel Transylvania: Transformania
Itaru Yamamoto	2023	Undead Girl Murder Farce
David Harbour	2024	Creature Commandos
Jacob Elordi	2025	Frankenstein
Christian Bale	2026	The Bride!

== See also ==
- Frankenstein in popular culture
- List of films featuring Frankenstein's monster
- Allotransplantation, the transplantation of body parts from one person to another
- Xenotransplantation – Transplantation of cells or tissue across species
- Frankenstein's Promethean dimension
- Plainpalais
