= Army of Frankensteins =

- Directed by: Ryan Bellgardt
- Screenplay by: Ryan Bellgardt
- Story by: Ryan Bellgardt; Andy Swanson; Josh McKamie
- Based on: Frankenstein by Mary Shelley
- Produced by: Ryan Bellgardt; Andy Swanson; Josh McKamie
- Starring: Jordan Farris; Christian Bellgardt; Rett Terrell; John Ferguson; Raychelle McDonald; Eric Berger
- Cinematography: Josh McKamie
- Edited by: Andy Swanson
- Music by: David Hamilton
- Production companies: Six Stitches Entertainment; Boiling Point
- Distributed by: Transformer
- Release date: August 2, 2014 (Japan)
- Country: United States
- Language: English
- Budget: $65,000

Army of Frankensteins is a 2014 American science fiction horror film written and directed by Ryan Bellgardt. It stars Jordan Farris as a time-traveling youth who, along with multiple versions of Frankenstein's monster (Eric Berger), are pulled into the American Civil War.

== Plot ==
Alan Jones is a recently unemployed grocery store worker. One night he decides to go back to find his coworker Ashley and propose to her, but when he sees her kissing his former boss, he leaves.

While heading home, Alan’s kidnapped by a child genius named Igor and taken to a warehouse of Dr. Tanner Finski. There they remove one of Alan’s eyeballs and put it into his Frankenstein monster. While Igor injects Frankenstein with a special regeneration liquid, Alan stumbles and activates the process which brings Frankenstein to life. Suddenly a lightning bolt comes and overloads the system. An interdimensional portal appears creating multiple Frankenstein copies before the portal swallows everyone and takes them to 1865 in the middle of a battle of the American Civil War.

The Frankensteins immediately start attacking the Confederate and Union soldiers, killing many of them. Alan is rescued by Corporal Solomon Jones, who Alan found out earlier is his Great-great-great grandfather. He is taken to the infirmary next to the dying Dr. Finski where he begins seeing images of what the original Frankenstein sees. Igor is behind Confederate lines where Lt. Swanson takes his injector before letting him leave to the Union side. Swanson shows the injector to Capt. Walton, who injects a cat and watching it turn into a giant beast that runs into the woods.

Dr. Finski tells them that they must kill the Frankenstein to create a portal back before dying. So Alan, Igor, Solomon, and Virginia (a medic and Solomon’s girlfriend) go out and find them. They eventually track them down to another Union camp. During the fight, Virginia is cornered by the original Frankenstein in a hot air balloon and they fly off. Virginia is able to explain to Frankenstein her life as a slave and explain what they’re fighting for. Frankenstein understands and agrees to help the Union, causing the duplicate Frankensteins to relax. Their balloon is then shot down by the Confederacy and they get captured. While heading back to camp, Solomon is attacked by the cat beast and has his left forearm removed.

At the Confederate camp, Walton sees how strong Frankenstein is from the injection, so he orders Swanson to inject himself with the regeneration liquid, which turns him into a larger stronger Confederate monster. Thinking the war is now won, Walton lets them go to tell the Union about their doom. Virginia arrives at the Union camp along with all the Frankensteins. She’s able to convince the soldiers they are on their side, giving them hope.

The next day a big and gory battle takes place. With the help of the Frankensteins and the disintegration ray Igor built to replace Solomon’s left forearm, they are victorious. As the Frankenstein surround Walton and the Confederate monster, Virginia’s sister Maggie stabs the original Frankenstein in revenge for killing her soldier boyfriend earlier. With the other Frankensteins falling in pain, the Confederate monster disables Solomon’s ray gun and kills Maggie before leaving.

When Abraham Lincoln hears about the battle, he invites Alan, Igor and Frankenstein to the White House. Before leaving, Igor starts ingesting the regeneration liquid and gives Solomon a bag not to open until he’s gone. Once there, Lincoln mentions that Walton and the Confederate monster also arrived and he needs to find out why. They track them down at a tavern, where Igor tries to sneak in. He’s able to find out they’re talking with John Wilkes Booth about killing Lincoln before he’s spotted. As he tries to run, he’s shot by Walton. As Igor dies, Frankenstein calls on the other Frankensteins to join him, followed by Solomon and Virginia.

Alan and Frankenstein meet Walton, Booth and the Confederate monster at the theatre. The two monsters fight while Alan and Booth battle inside. As Solomon and the Frankensteins arrive, the Confederate monster had knocked out Frankenstein. With the other Frankensteins out, Solomon tries to take him on himself. Meanwhile, Booth is able to knock out Alan and continue.

Eventually, Frankenstein regains consciousness and the other Frankensteins recover and save Solomon by beating down the Confederate monster. When Walton begins insulting the Confederate monster, he throws Walton into the Frankensteins allowing them to rip him into pieces. As Booth fires the gun, Frankenstein steps in front of Lincoln and is shot instead. The bullet staggers Frankenstein, causing him to knock Lincoln over the balcony before Frankenstein goes over squashing Lincoln. As Booth tries to leave, Solomon disintegrates him. As Frankenstein dies, the other Frankensteins disappear and the portal appears allowing Alan to go back.

Alan is back at the warehouse just as a portal is opening. He warns Igor about his death, but since Igor believes that Alan would die if he didn’t go, he leaves anyway. Alan goes back to the grocery store where he punches out his ex-boss and asks Ashley to marry him. She refuses since they’re not ready. When Alan gives Ashley a $5 bill, he sees that it has Frankenstein’s face on it. When he does an ancestry search on Solomon Jones, he finds that he married Virginia and adopted Igor, making him his Great-great grandfather. The bag Igor gave to Solomon contained a metal rod with instructions to stick it in his grave during a stormy night. A lightning bolt hits it, activating the regeneration fluid to bring him back to life.

== Cast ==
- Jordan Farris as Alan Jones
- Christian Bellgardt as Igor
- Rett Terrell as Solomon Jones
- John Ferguson as Dr. Tanner Finski
- Raychelle McDonald as Virginia
- Eric Berger as Frankenstein's monster
- Gary Olinghouse as Eugene

== Production ==
Shooting took place entirely within Oklahoma. Bellgardt recruited local actors to star in his film. For Dr. Finski, he always sought John Ferguson, who had played horror host Count Gregore. Berger, a fan of classic Frankenstein films, won his part partially through his knowledge of the classic monster. Berger was initially wary of becoming involved in a local, low budget effort, but his love for the character won out.

== Release ==
Army of Frankensteins played at the DeadCENTER Film Festival in October 2014. It was released in Japan on August 2, 2014. It was released in the U.S. and Canada on Blu-ray, DVD, on demand, and digital on September 1, 2015.

== Reception ==
Megan Sando of the Stillwater News Press called it a "hilarious sci-fi adventure" whose "gory special effects make up for the sometimes questionable acting". Mark L. Miller of Ain't It Cool News wrote that it is "a love letter to those classic horror films of old". Miller criticized the monster design but said that "seeing an army of them is amazingly fun". Amanda Hunt of Scream magazine rated it 3.5/5 stars and wrote that the film's creative and fun gore effects make up for its occasionally unconvincing acting. Jeremy Blitz of DVD Talk rated it 2/5 stars and wrote, "This film is doomed not so much by its badness, but by its mediocrity."

It won Best Fantasy Film at the 2014 PollyGrind Film Festival and Best Musical Score at the 2014 Melbourne Independent Filmmakers Festival.
