= Víctor Meliveo =

Spanish photographer and video artist

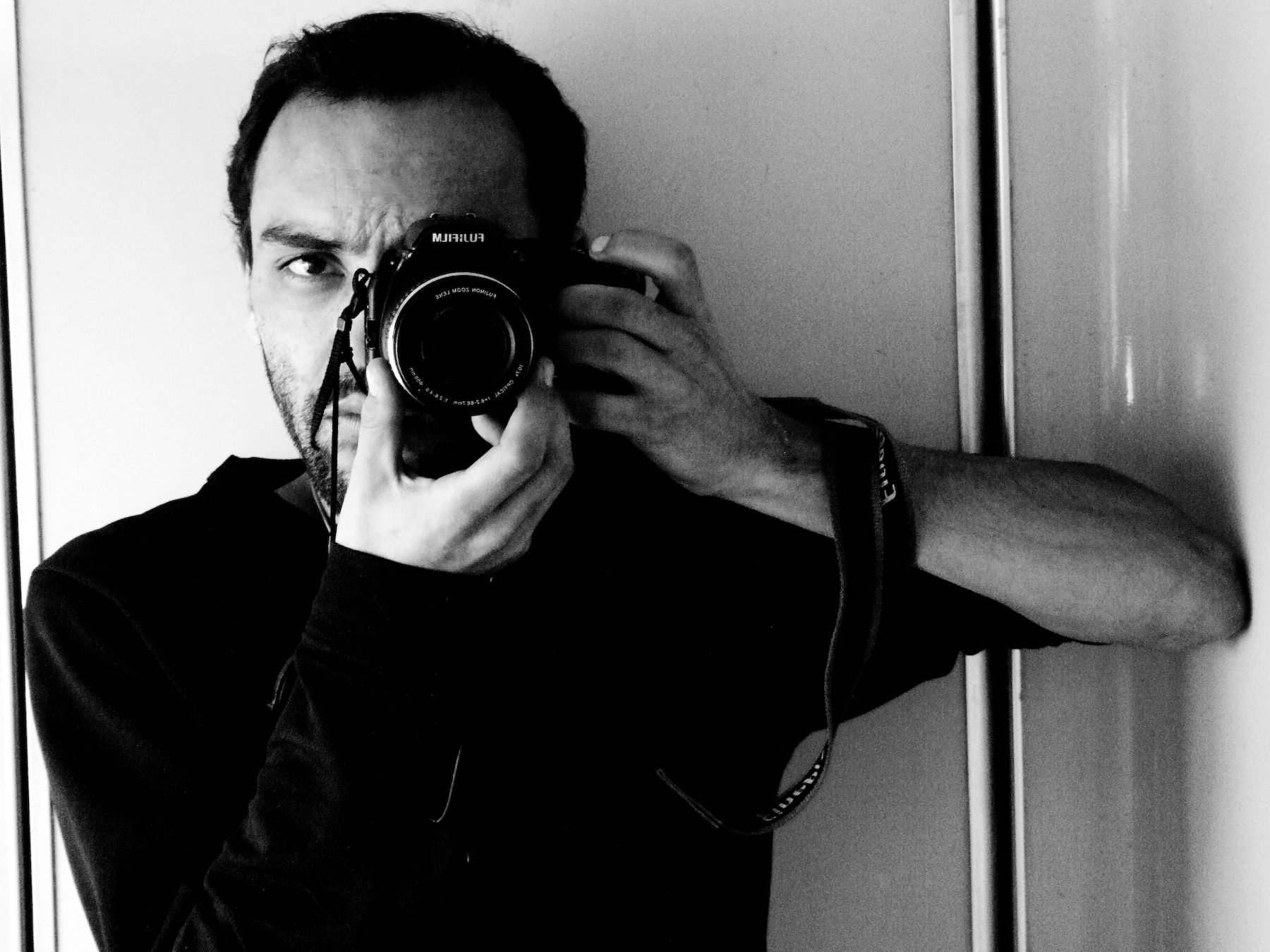
- Born: 1980 (age 45–46); Málaga
- Education: ESAD
- Awards: Málaga Film Festival Prize
- Website: www.victormeliveo.com

Víctor Meliveo (born 1980, Málaga) is a Spanish photographer and video artist. After an accident he lost most of his vision. Throughout his professional career he has won several awards highlighting the Malaga Film Festival Prize (2006).

== Career ==
Seduced by theater and circus, he studied Dramatic Art in Malaga (ESAD, 1999–2003) and began to act and direct shows of street theater and juggling, with his theater company "Supersonic".

At age 23 he had an accident juggling, affecting both eyes. After seven surgical operations, he managed to keep his eyesight enough to continue working. He lost 90% of the vision of one eye and 60% of the other, and had to rethink his life. He could no longer direct theater, but could edit, so his professional life turned upside down, towards audiovisual production and editing.

After working as editor in the film "Summer Rain" (Spanish El camino de los ingleses, Antonio Banderas, 2006), he studied a Master in editing and postproduction (Final Cut Studio. CICE Madrid. 2008) and Professional Lighting (EFTI Madrid, 2008). He specialized in video art and video production, creating small artistic pieces in the video format. His first graphic exhibition was in 2005 in Malaga, and from there he began to exhibit in different cities in Spain and abroad: Japan, United States, France, London, Ireland, Berlin, Shanghai.

In 2008 he presented the series "Dermocartographies", with scanned images of bodies and faces of some generation partners. The proposal was exhibited at the National Blind Organization, ONCE Foundation, and was curated by Julio César Abad. He also took as part editor in the documentary feature “Action” (ZDF Kultur TV and RTVE), at the thirtieth anniversary of La Fura dels Baus, achieving the union between the audiovisual and theatrical world.

Through the "Asia full of Contrasts" project, it toured five Southeast Asian countries, reflecting on cultural diversity and global awareness. At the Biennial of Contemporary Art (ONCE Foundation, 2014) he showed the video "Sufrían por la luz", based on a surrealist poem by Vicente Aleixandre, which had already been awarded by the Malaga Film Festival with the first prize and the audience prize. He worked with Antonio Banderas again, when the actor began his activity in the world of fashion and design.

In 2016 Meliveo returned to the ONCE Biennial with the "Scan and Tech Project".The first time he had used the scanner as artistic technology was with José Luis Aguilera "Bongore" at the Matadero in Madrid (2008). In the Scan and Tech Project he was merging the video art and the audiovisual installation with the experimental photography, a kind of research on the relationship between technology and disability, through portraits obtained with a scanner. The portraits were made to musicians, photographers, artists ..., with their work tools, mixing the tactile with the visual. Through the scanner he touched the image, as if it were braille. He used the scanography new technique: the image is deformed when the object is moved or the scanner itself.

He is professor in the Higher Degrees of Realization and Sound, and in Lighting, teaching the subjects of Registry, Sound Expression, Television, Lighting, Digital Photography, Editing and Projects.

== Featured filmography as director ==
- Travel Reflexions (and Maybe Mirrors) (2016)
- Scan and Tech, video installation (2016)
- Mad World, Videoclip Malaka Youth band (2015)
- Concha Buika World Tour, videoclips & promotional videos (2013).
- Asia Full of Contrasts, documentary (2013)
- Neukölln Berlin Wake Up Dance, videodance (2012)
- Dermocartografías, videocreation (2009)
- La violación, (2007)
- Sufrían por la luz, (2006)
- BITss, (2005)
- Vrutal Communication, videocreation (2004)
- Manhattan Photo (2003)
- "Acción. 30 años de la Fura del Baus" (2011)

== Awards ==
- Festival de Cine de Málaga 2006- Sufrían por la luz, First Prize and Prize of the Public
- Emmy Awards 2015, Nomination - “Take Back The Mic”. USA/Spain. Edition, Post-production and Sound Design.
- 2001 First Award. Arte y Creación Joven del Instituto Andaluz de la Juventud.

== Video exhibitions and festivals ==
- 2018 Museo Picasso 15 Aniversario VR Tech
- 2016 “Scan and Tech”. VI Contemporary Art Biennial ONCE Foundation
- 2014 “Sufrían por la Luz”. V Contemporary Art Biennial ONCE Foundation
- 2012 “Berlin Wake Up Dance”. VideoArt Germany/Spain. San Francisco, Atlanta, Marsella, Madrid...
- 2008 “Picasso Vive aquí”. Patronato de Turismo. Exhibition in Berlín, Tokio, Bruselas, Shangai, Seul, Londres, Roma, Ámsterdam, Madrid, Dublín
- 2008 “Bitss”. Biennale dei Giovani Artisti dell'Europa e del Mediterraneo, Bari, Italia.
