= Liri Blues Festival =

Music festival

- Genre: Blues
- Dates: late June - first fortnight of July
- Locations: Isola del Liri (between Rome and Naples, Italy)
- Years active: 1988 - present
- Founders: Luciano Duro
- Website: http://www.liribluesfestival.it

The Liri Blues Festival, founded in 1988, is one of the main blues music festivals in Italy. It takes place every year in July in Isola del Liri, a small town twinned with the city of New Orleans since 1997.

== Festival ==
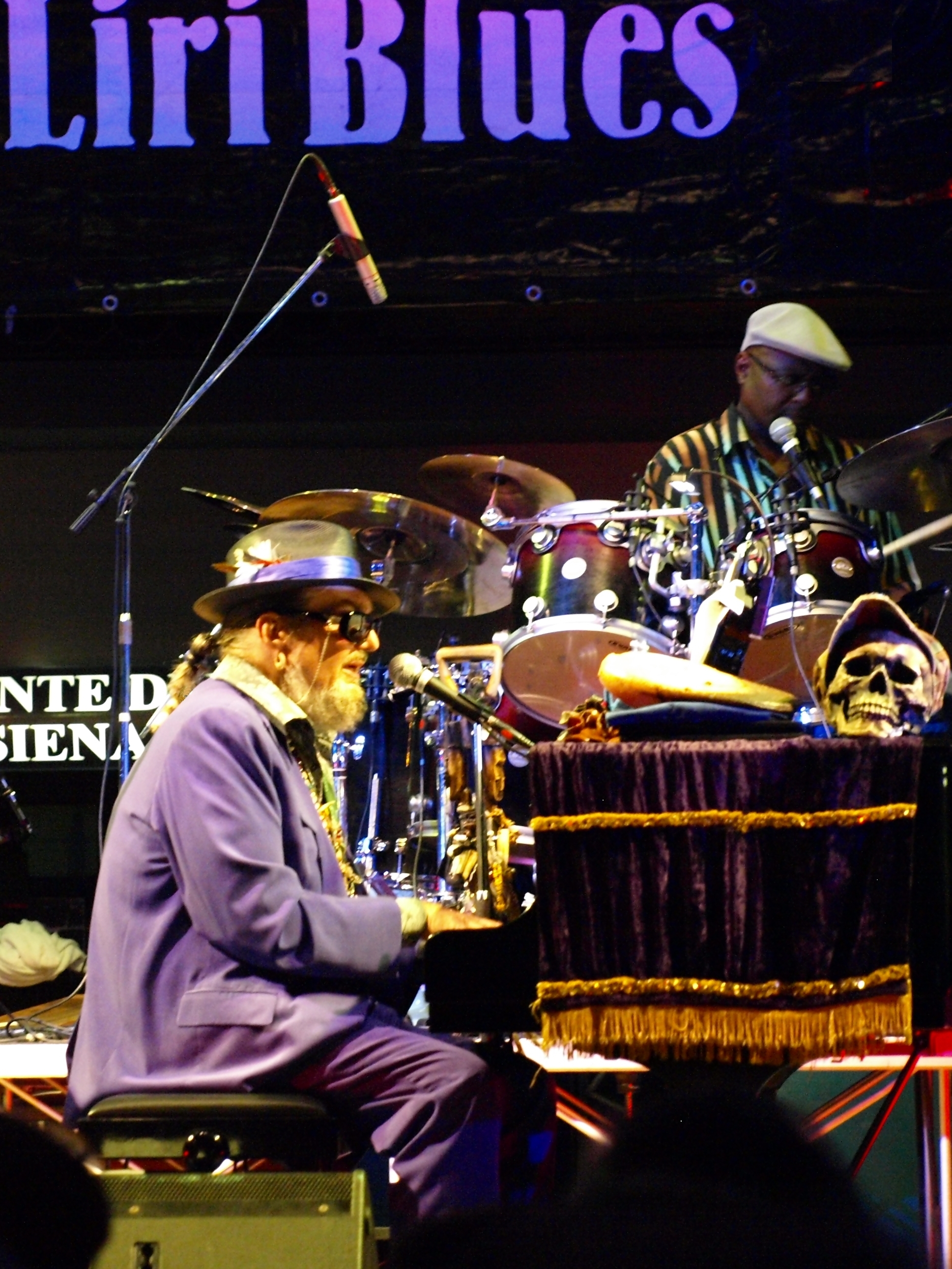
Dr. John at Liri Blues 2010

The Liri Blues Festival, known as "Liri Blues", has been taking place since 1988 in Isola del Liri, a small Italian town famous for its waterfall, which is 90 feet (28 m) high and situated in the centre. The festival is a free, annual event and usually occurs during the month of July. Concerts are held in the main square (Piazza Boncompagni), in the streets and jam sessions happen late at night.

Following its initial success in the first few years, the Liri Blues Festival was shared with neighbouring towns, in particular Ferentino and Veroli. However, since the early years of the 21st century, Isola del Liri is once again the central location for the festival. Boncompagni Square plays host to the main events just as it did for the very first gig in 1988.

A winter session of the festival was briefly introduced in the early part of the century (“Liri Blues Winter”) and saw performing some famous Italian bluesmen such as Roberto Ciotti, Fabio Treves and Paolo Bonfanti.

The festival, organised by Duke & Bird, has always counted on the important help of volunteers and blues connoisseurs like Mario Insenga (Blue Stuff), who has been a supporter of Liri Blues ever since its initial formation.

== History ==
=== Early years ===
When the first annual festival took place in 1988, Isola del Liri had been seeing its paper mills close one after the other. For more than 100 years these factories had provided work for the local population. The first three evenings of this festival symbolised an attempt to overcome years of deep industrial crisis.

The festival was created thanks to Luciano Duro, who managed to bring big international bluesmen to a small town in central Italy.

In the first years, organized by the jazz club Big Mama, important bluesmen like Albert King, Pinetop Perkins and Buddy Guy performed at Liri Blues.

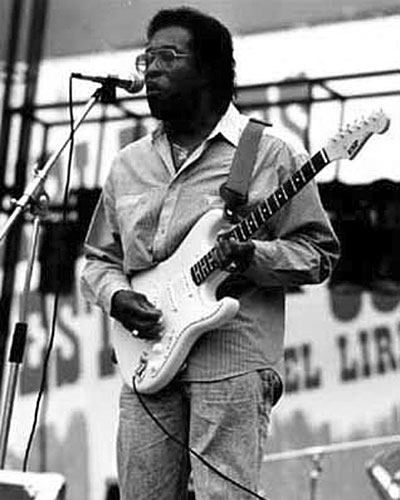
Buddy Guy at Liri Blues 1989

In the 1990s the festival gradually opened to different genres and influences. Musicians such as Jorma Kaukonen of Jefferson Airplane, Canned Heat, Art Ensemble of Chicago, Pentangle, Fairport Convention, Elliott Murphy, and The Fleshtones played in Isola del Liri. The latter, after the concert had finished, gave another encore from their hotel room just behind the stage!

Liri Blues, however, remained distinctly a blues festival, with artists like Luther Allison, Son Seals and Jimmy Rogers. Blue Stuff played neapolitan blues in dialect together with James Cotton and Rockin' Dopsie.

The festival was organized by Jazz'n'Arts until its tenth year; management then changed over to Duke & Bird. The festival grew, and more dates in neighbouring towns were added, such as Ferentino for jazz concerts (Mike Stern, Yellowjackets) and Veroli for gospel and soul (Shemekia Copeland, The Soul Stirrers). Isola del Liri, however, remained the heart of Liri Blues, with artists the likes of Bo Diddley, R. L. Burnside and Honeyboy Edwards performing in the main square.

By the end of the century the festival covered a period of eleven days throughout the province.

=== Tenth year and twinning with New Orleans ===
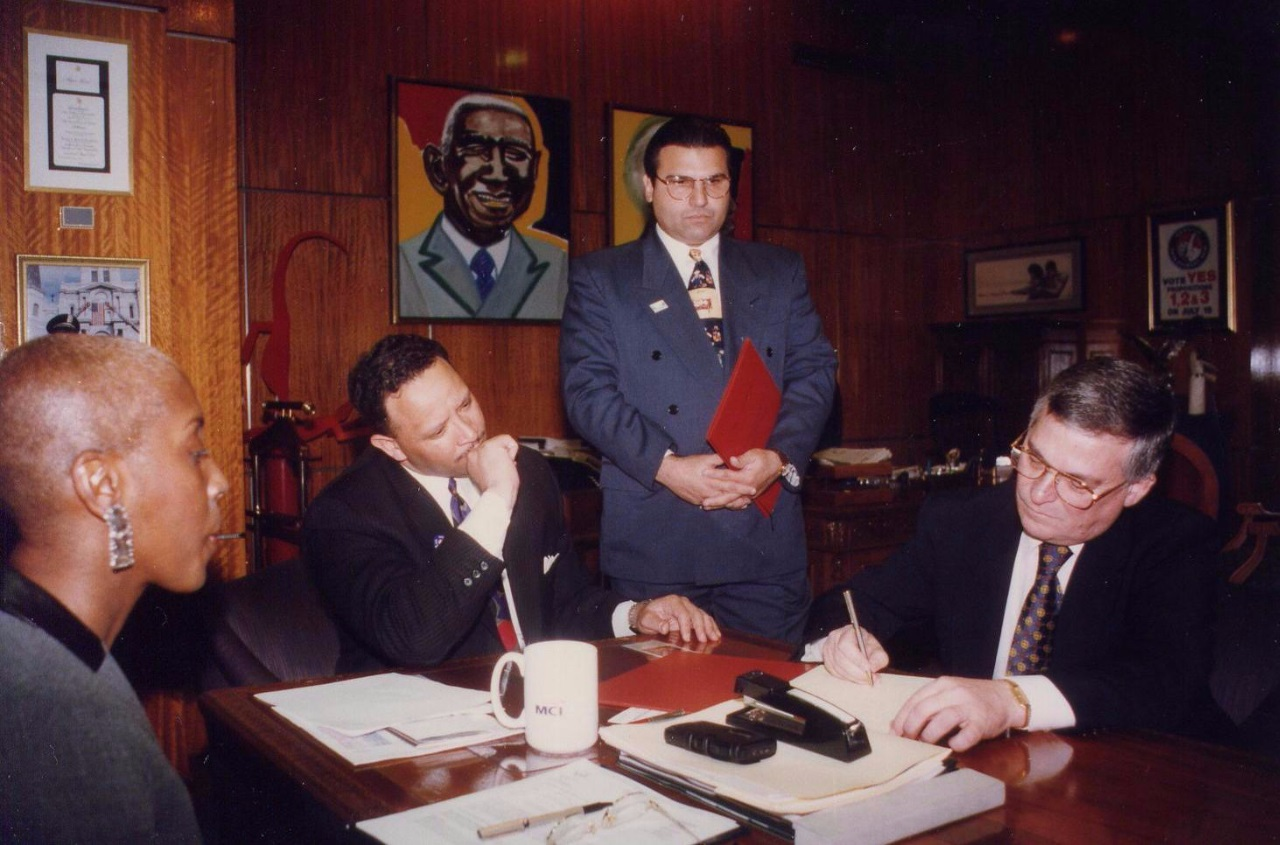
Signing of the twinning between the communities of Isola del Liri and New Orleans (New Orleans, January 7, 1997).

On January 7, 1997, for the tenth annual Liri Blues, the then mayor of Isola del Liri and the initiator of the festival went to Louisiana to sign the twinning between the two towns and to receive the freedom of the city of New Orleans.

"The City of New Orleans is honored that you have chosen its rich heritage and culture as the centerpieces of your tenth annual Liri Blues Festival"

— Marc. H. Morial, ex-mayor of New Orleans, thanking the then mayor of Isola del Liri after the twinning between the two towns - January 31st, 1997

The celebrations of the twinning continued in Isola del Liri, where the clarinettist Alvin Batiste, who once taught Branford Marsalis, gave a concert involving musicians from Isola and New Orleans.

Batiste performed, among others, a jazz song called Isola del Liri, conceived for the occasion, he later included it in the album Songs, Words and Messages, Connections.

As a token of their strong relationship over the years, Liri Blues was instrumental in helping the musicians of New Orleans following the devastation caused by hurricane Katrina in August 2005. On November 9 a charity concert (the "New Orleans Day") was organized. Corey Harris (protagonist of Scorsese's Feel Like Going Home) and a few other groups performed.

=== Return to Isola del Liri ===
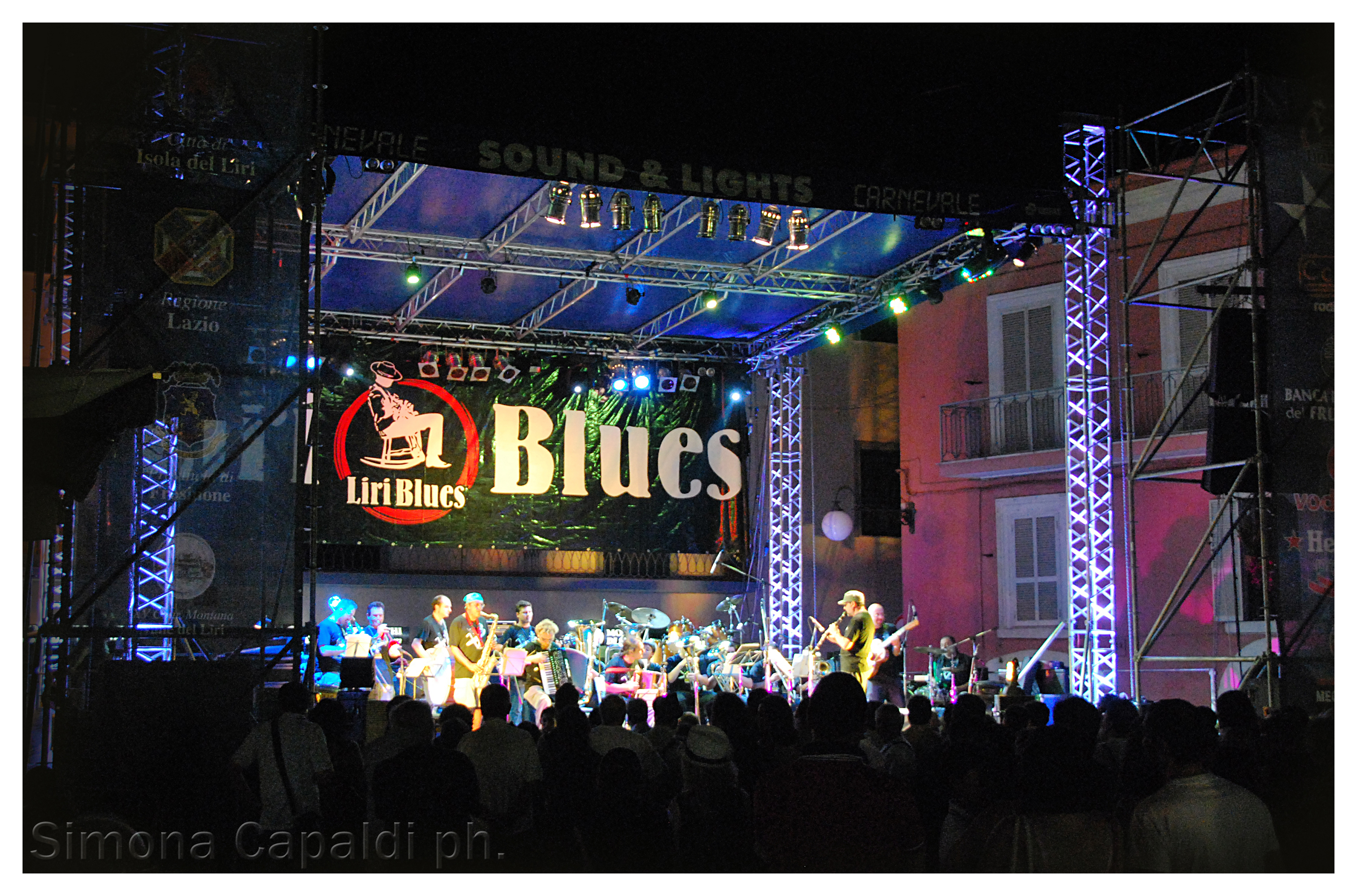
An evening at the 23rd Liri Blues (July 2010) in Boncompagni Square, Isola del Liri

In 2001 there was a memorable performance by John Mayall, Isola del Liri went back to being the central location for the festival. In the following three years the location changed to SS. Triade Square and then came back to the original Boncompagni Square.

In 2002 RAI Radio 1, the main Italian public radio station, started to follow the whole festival. They transmitted live recordings (such as the concert of Robben Ford) and interviews with Roy Rogers and others, through their programme Radioscrigno. The collaboration with RAI has continued ever since.

In 2007 the festival celebrated 20 years of concerts and 10 years of twinning with New Orleans. In a courageous project, Piccola Orchestra La Viola and Dr. Sunflower, an orchestra of squeeze boxes and a jug band, played traditional blues from Louisiana. The CD Tribute to New Orleans, recorded live at Liri Blues 2006, was presented. Willy DeVille and Charlie Musselwhite performed.

Dr. John closed the 2010 festival, cementing the permanent link between the small Italian town and the Louisiana metropolis.

== Music ==
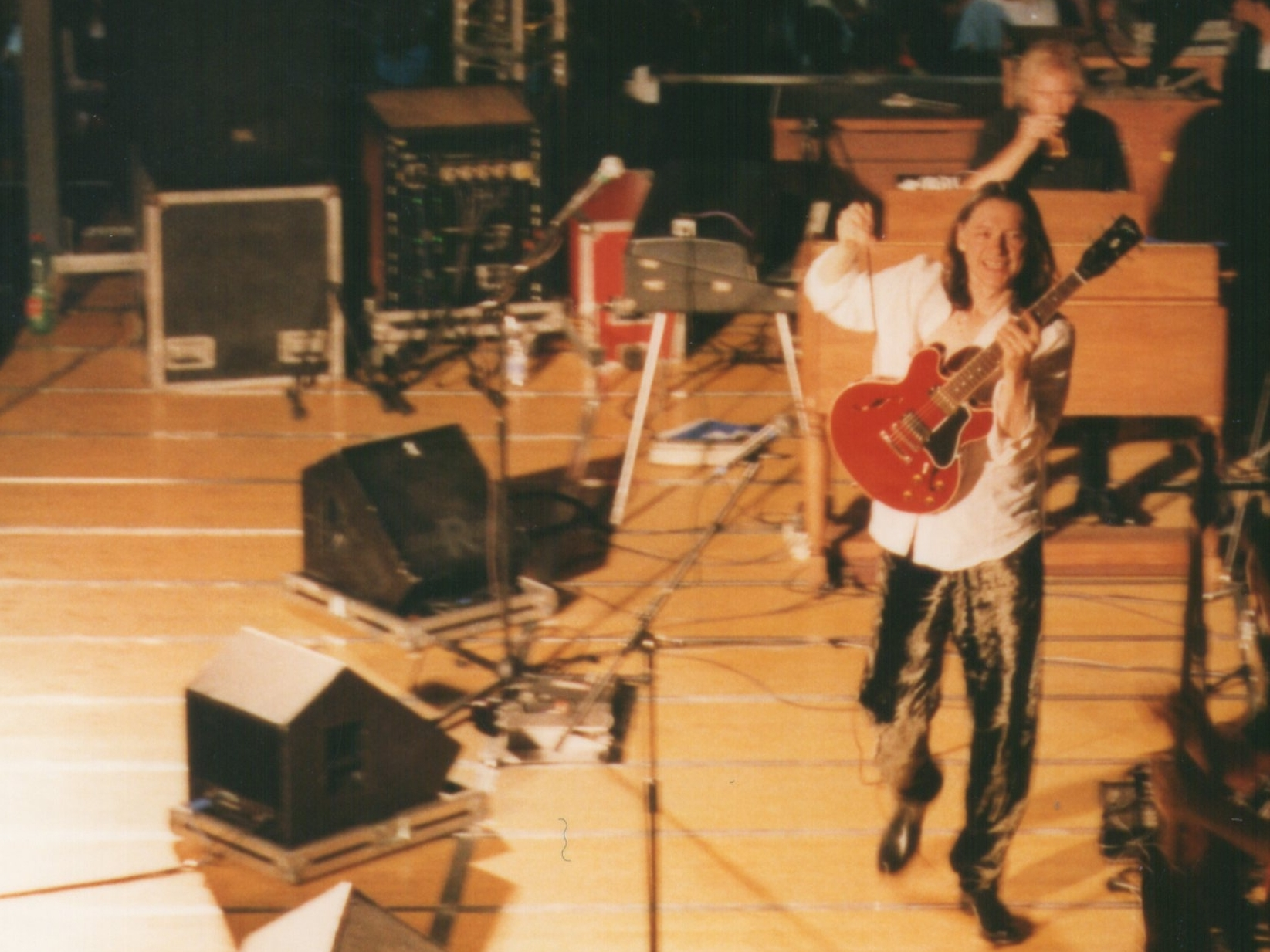
Robben Ford at Liri Blues (SS. Triade Square, Isola del Liri, October 2002)

Liri Blues and Isola del Liri have become very attached to Louisiana and in particular to the twin city New Orleans. Various artists who have performed at the festival, like Dr. John, Alvin Batiste, Rockin' Dopsie, C. J. Chenier and Zachary Richard with his zydeco style, have been and still are ambassadors of the music of Louisiana throughout the world.

As a rule, however, the bluesmen from the U.S. have been the main protagonists, with leading figures like Dr. John, Jimmy Smith, Charlie Musselwhite and more modern artists like Scott Henderson, Robben Ford and Eric Bibb.

European musicians have also been prominent, especially English performers like Paul Lamb, John Martyn and Robin Trower. British Blues in general has been represented by the likes of John Mayall & the Bluesbreakers, Mick Taylor and Eric Burdon and The Animals.

Among Italians, apart from those already mentioned, noteworthy artists have been Rudy Rotta, Alex Britti, Tolo Marton, Robi Zonca, Guido Toffoletti.

In the more recent years there have been traditional bluesmen like Al Kooper and Taj Mahal, original characters like Otis Taylor, Maceo Parker, Colosseum and skillful guitarists like Sonny Landreth, Derek Trucks and Albert Lee.

== Performers ==
Some of the artists who have performed at Liri Blues since 1988 include:

- Johnny Adams
- Albert King (1989)
- Luther Allison (1996)
- Art Ensemble of Chicago
- Alvin Batiste (1997)
- Carey Bell (1999, 2005)
- Edoardo Bennato (alias Joe Sarnataro) (1993)
- Eric Bibb (2000, 2003, 2011)
- R. L. Burnside (1992)
- Blue Stuff (1991, 2004)
- Billy Branch (1995, 1999)
- Alex Britti (1991)
- The Campbell Brothers (2008)
- Buddy Guy (1989)
- Hiram Bullock (1998)
- Eric Burdon & The Animals (2005)
- Canned Heat (2000)
- C. J. Chenier (1998)
- Roberto Ciotti (1990, 2004)
- Jon Cleary (2008)
- Michael Coleman (1992, 1995)
- James Cotton (1993)
- Popa Chubby
- Colosseum (2011)
- Shemekia Copeland (2000)
- Guy Davis (2012)
- Jimmy Dawkins (1994)
- Willy DeVille (2007)
- Bo Diddley (1997)
- Rockin' Dopsie (1993)
- Honeyboy Edwards (1991, 2003)
- Fairport Convention (2003)
- The Fleshtones (1990)
- Robben Ford (2001)
- Ruthie Foster (2010)
- John Hammond (1990, 2001)
- Corey Harris (1999, 2005)
- Alvin Youngblood Hart (2003)
- Scott Henderson (1998)
- Holmes Brothers (2009)
- Dr. John (2010)
- Jimmy Johnson (1998)
- Jorma Kaukonen (2003)
- Keb' Mo' (2012)
- Willie Kent (2001)
- Al Kooper (2006)
- Sonny Landreth (2004, 2011)
- Paul Lamb (2003)
- Bettye LaVette (2011)
- Albert Lee (2011)
- Louisiana Red (1988)
- Magic Slim (1988, 2000)
- John Martyn (1990)
- John Mayall & the Bluesbreakers (2001)
- Mighty Sam McClain (1999, 2004)
- Elliott Murphy (2003)
- Matt 'Guitar' Murphy (1999)
- Charlie Musselwhite (2000, 2007)
- Kenny Neal (1999, 2003)
- Maceo Parker (2009)
- Pentangle
- Pinetop Perkins (1989)
- Lucky Peterson (1999, 2004)
- Noel Redding (1989)
- John Renbourn
- Zachary Richard (2003)
- Duke Robillard
- Jimmy Rogers (1997)
- Roy Rogers (2002, 2005)
- Roomful of Blues (1998)
- Son Seals (2000)
- Archie Shepp (1990)
- Jimmy Smith (2004)
- The Soul Stirrers (1996)
- Mike Stern (1998)
- Dr. Sunflower Jug Band
- Taj Mahal (2005)
- Melvin Taylor (1996)
- Mick Taylor
- Otis Taylor (2004, 2010)
- Nada, Daniele Silvestri, Têtes de Bois (2006)
- Hans Theessink (1994)
- Robin Trower (2005)
- Derek Trucks (2009)
- Ike Turner (1999)
- Joe Louis Walker (1999)
- Katie Webster (1996)
- Junior Wells (1989)
- Yellowjackets (2000)

== Discography ==
Albums recorded at the festival

- Dr. Sunflower and Piccola Orchestra La Viola: Omaggio a New Orleans (Live at Liri Blues 2006) (production: Liri Blues Festival and Terre in Moto, TIM011), 2010

== Photo gallery ==
=== Portraits ===
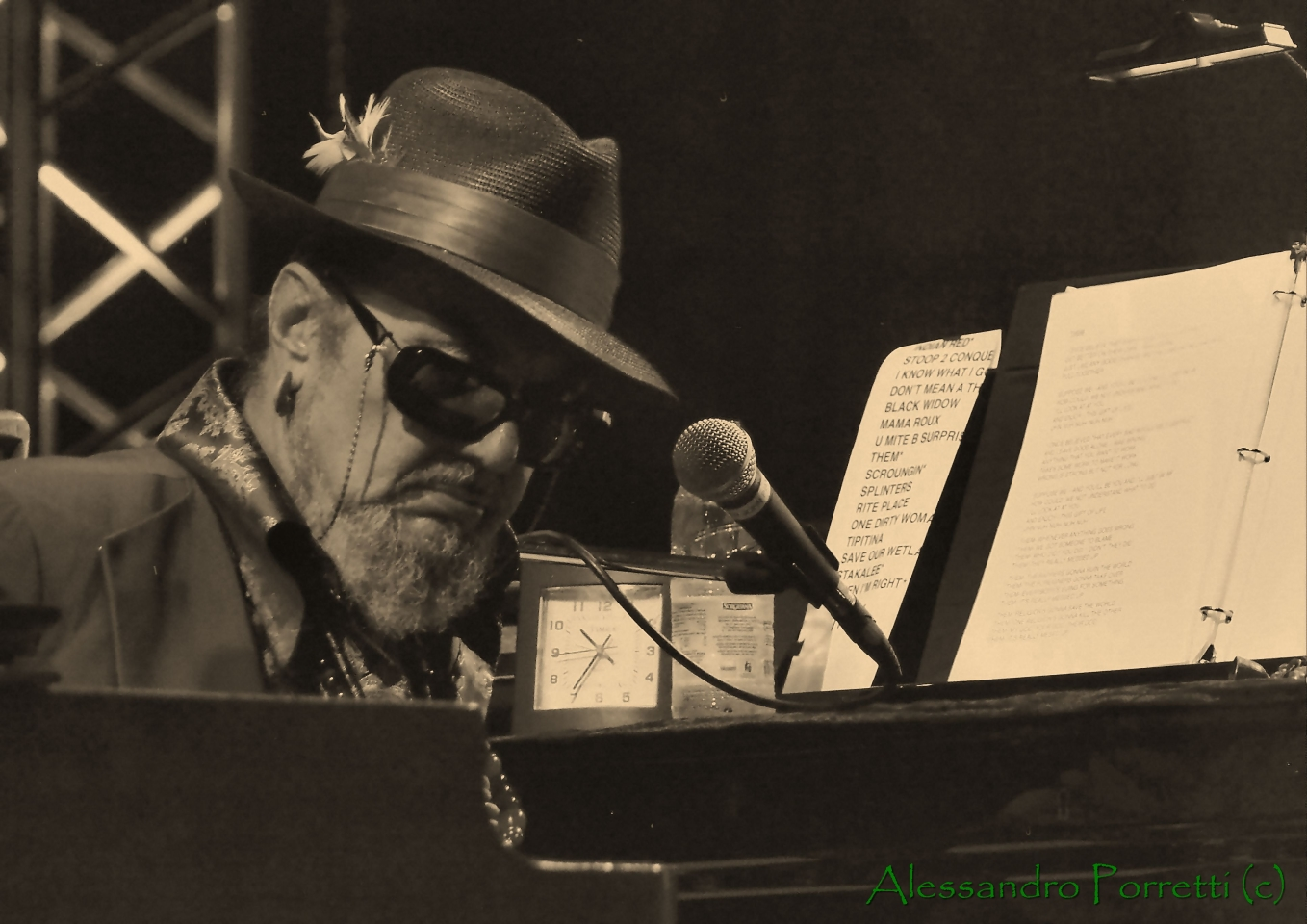
Dr. John

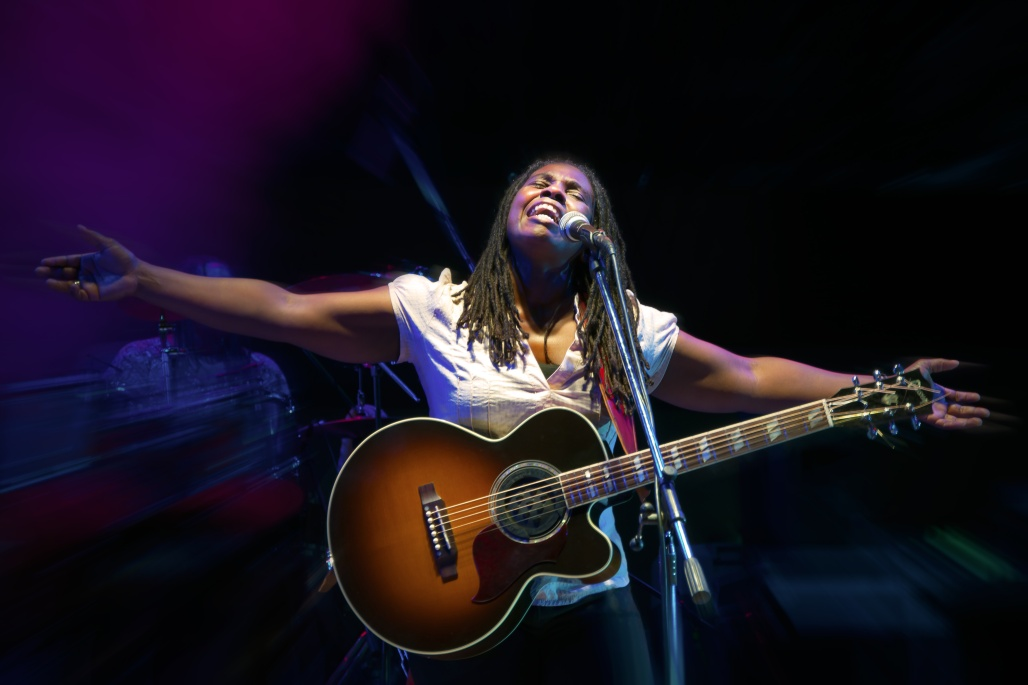
Ruthie Foster

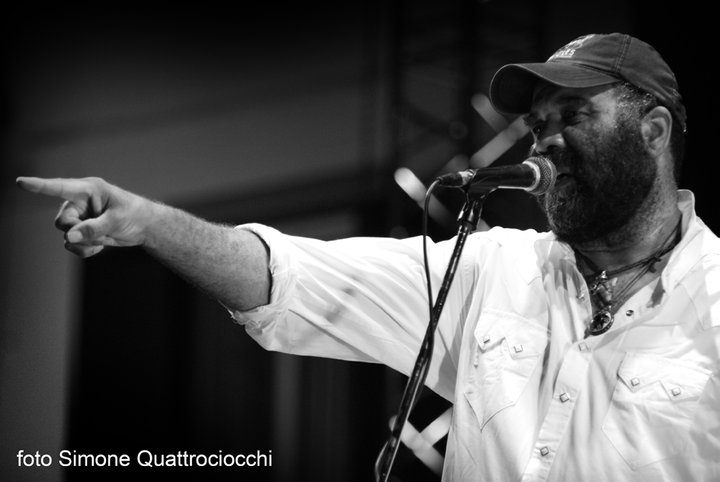
Otis Taylor

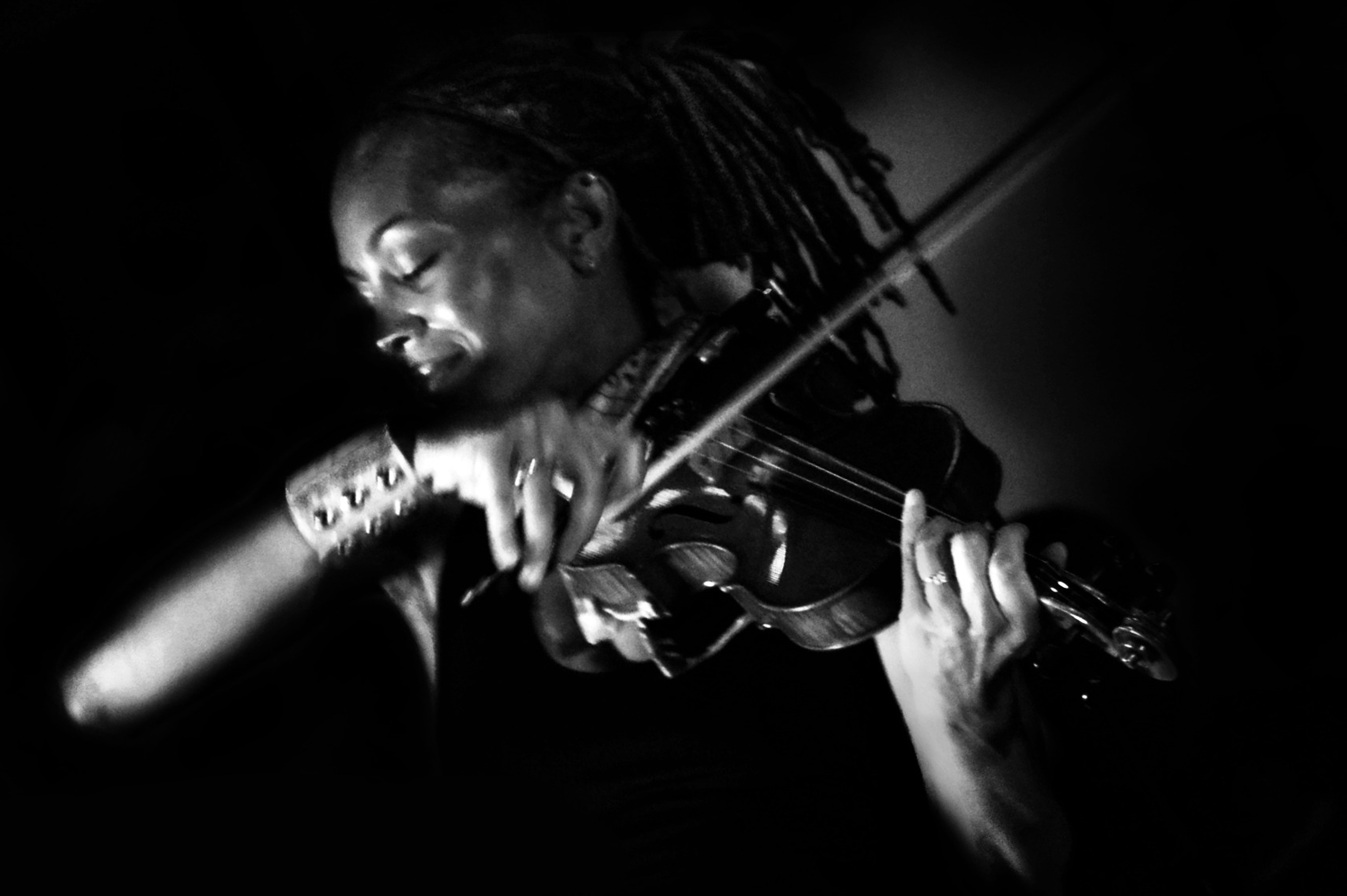
Anne Harris (Otis Taylor Band)

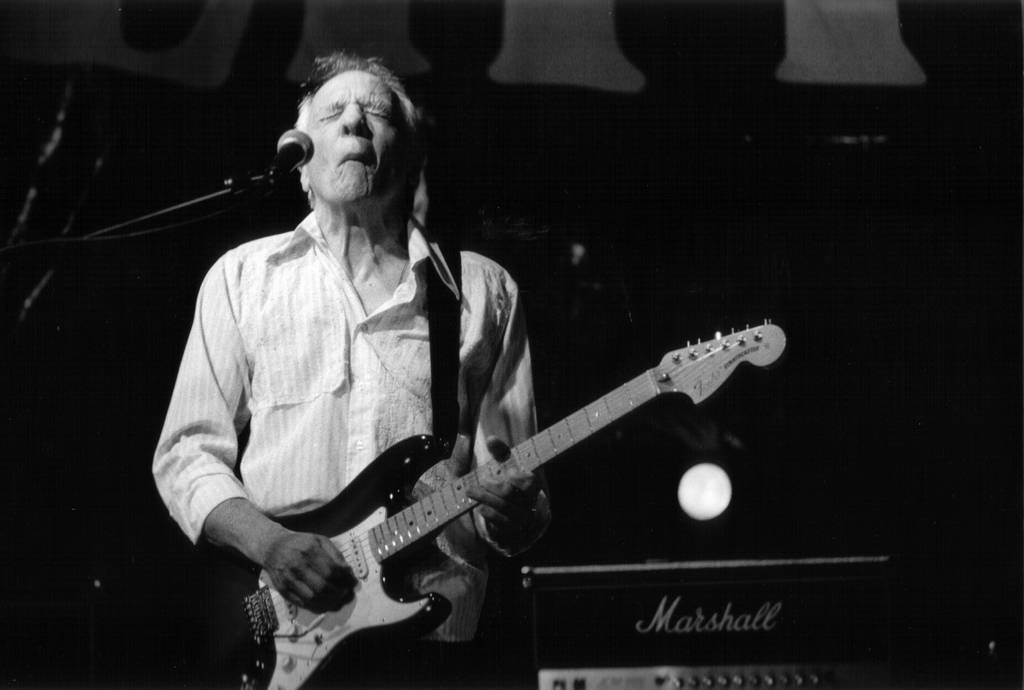
Robin Trower

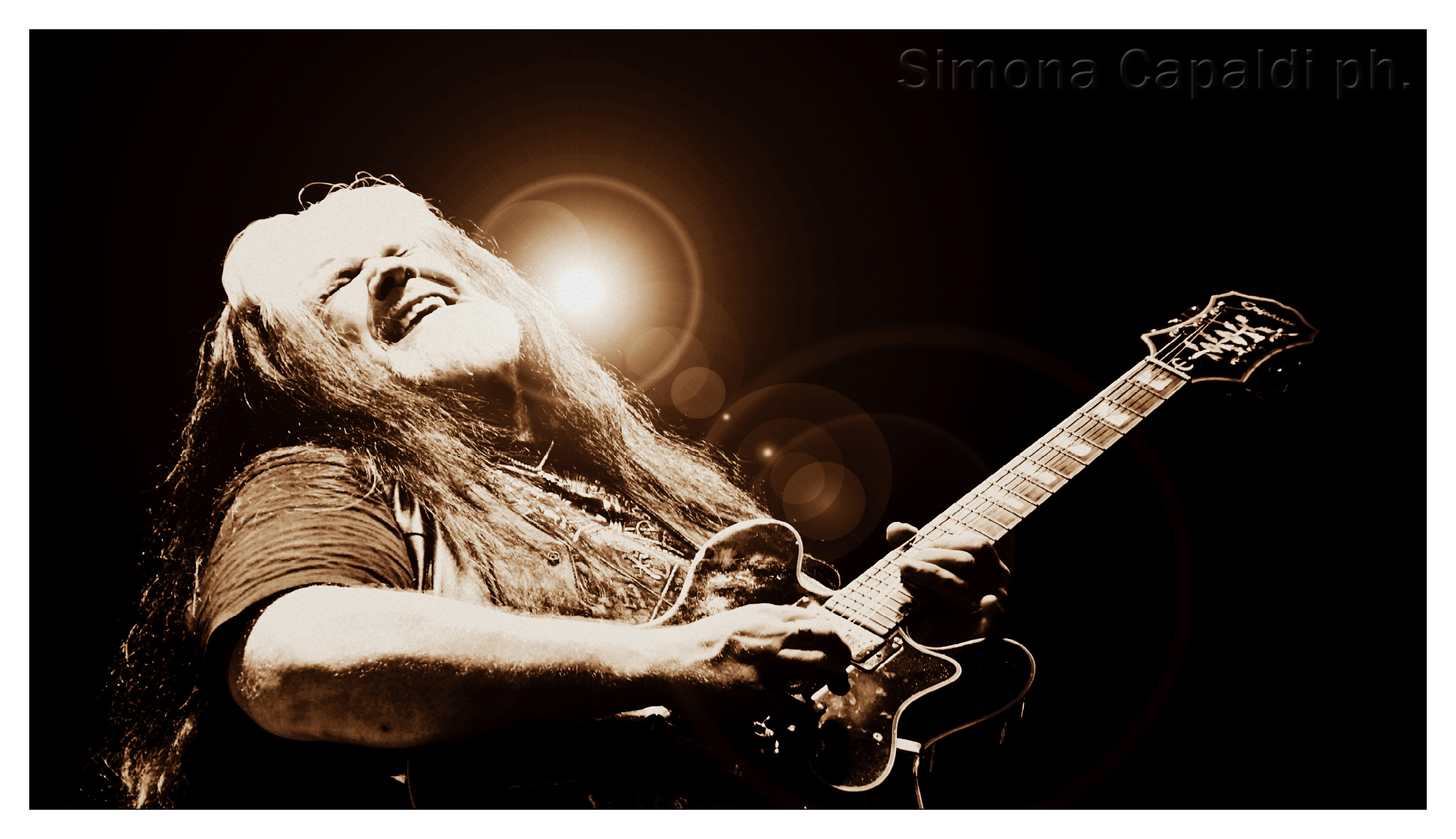
Rusty Wright

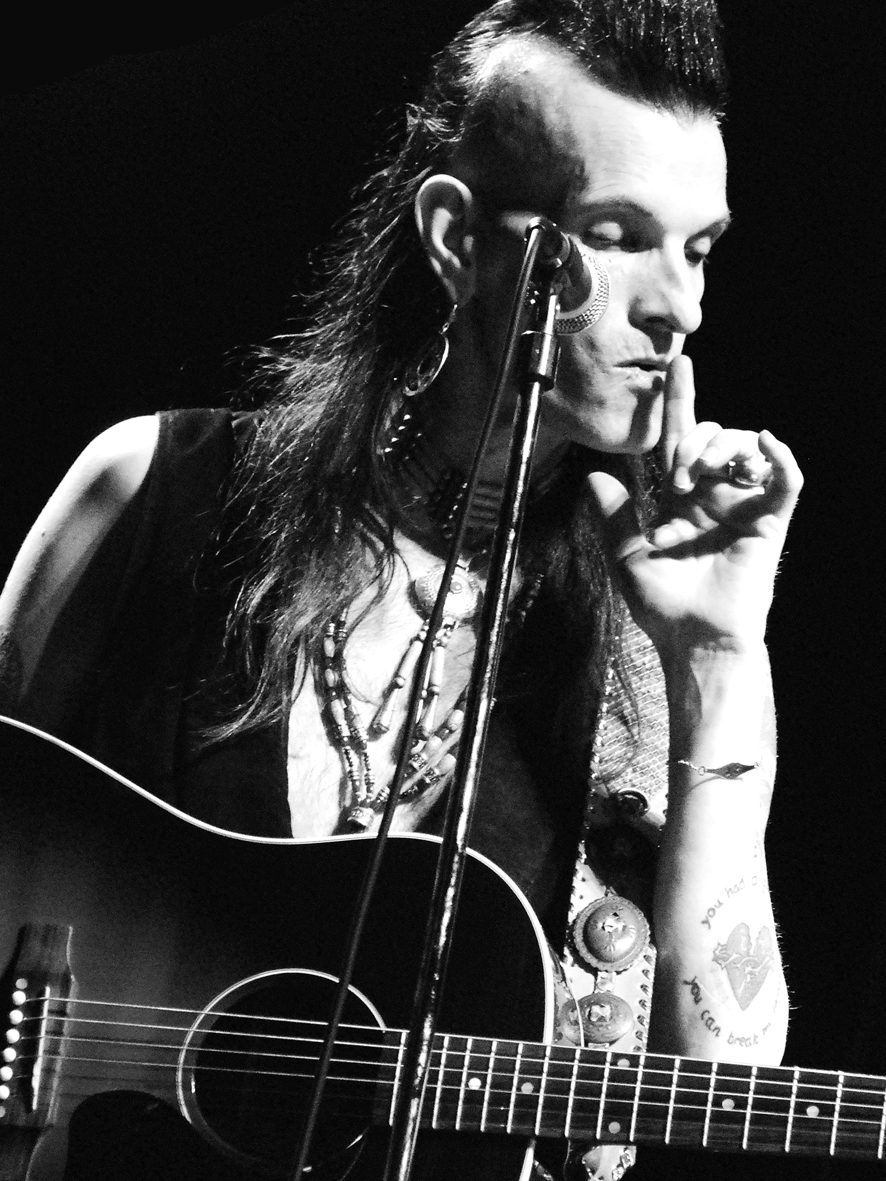
Willy DeVille

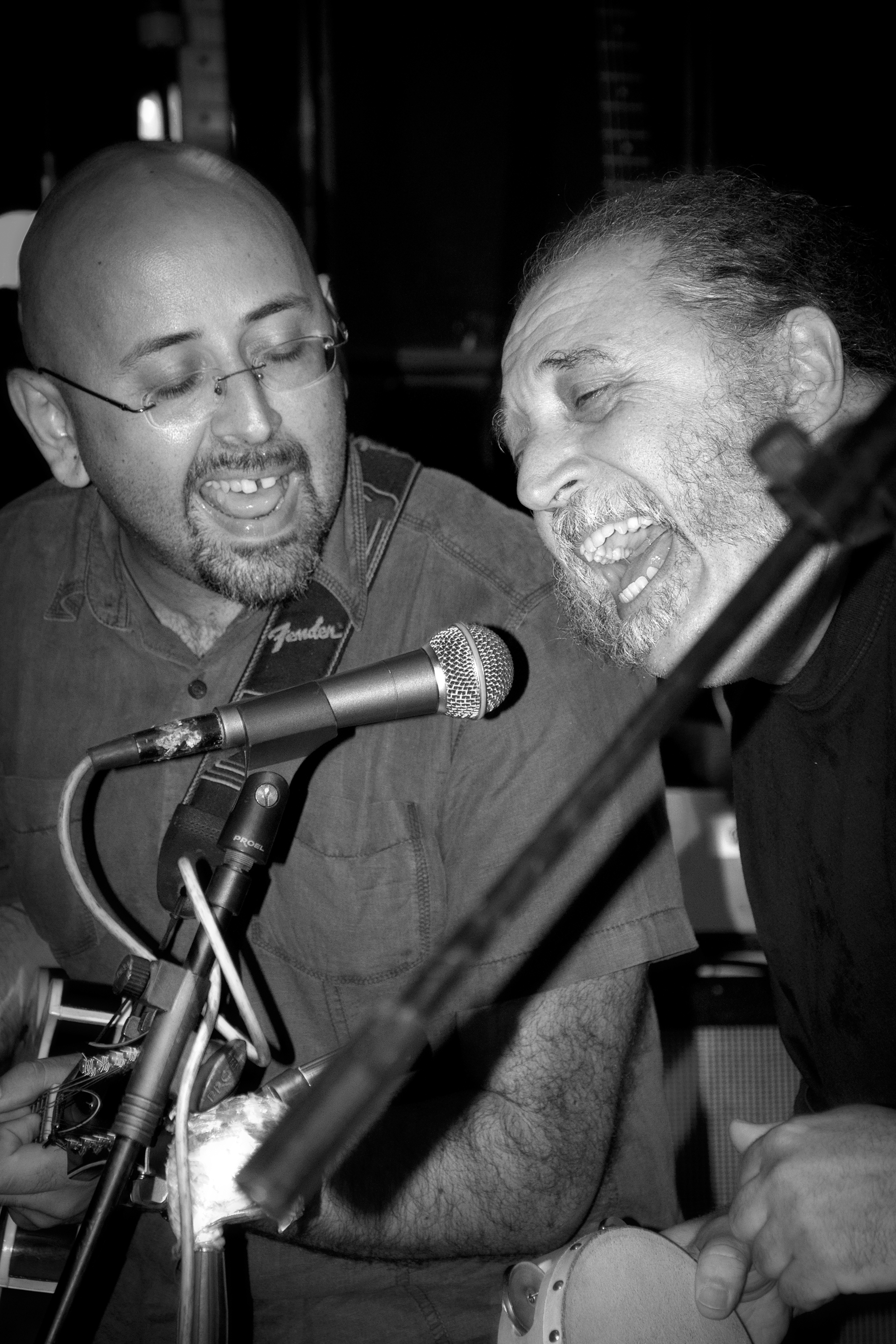
Mario Insenga and Lino Muoio

== See also ==
- List of blues festivals
- Isola del Liri
