= Marrakech Express =

- Film poster
- Directed by: Gabriele Salvatores
- Written by: Umberto Contarello; Carlo Mazzacurati; Enzo Monteleone
- Produced by: Gianni Minervini
- Starring: Diego Abatantuono; Fabrizio Bentivoglio; Cristina Marsillach; Giuseppe Cederna; Gigio Alberti
- Cinematography: Italo Petriccione
- Edited by: Nino Baragli
- Music by: Roberto Ciotti
- Distributed by: Columbia Tri-Star Films Italia
- Release date: 1989
- Running time: 110 minutes
- Country: Italy
- Language: Italian

Marrakech Express is a 1989 Italian film directed by Gabriele Salvatores and starring Diego Abatantuono, Fabrizio Bentivoglio, Cristina Marsillach, Giuseppe Cederna, and Gigio Alberti. A classical road movie, it was the first installment of Salvatores' trilogia della fuga ("escape trilogy"), followed by On Tour (1990) and the Academy Award winning Mediterraneo (1991). The cast of the three movies is partly the same; most notably, Diego Abatantuono has a leading role in all of them.

The plot revolves around a group of ex-high school friends that reunite in their 30s for a long journey together, and has been compared to Lawrence Kasdan's The Big Chill and Kevin Reynolds' Fandango. The soundtrack, that contributes to the nostalgic atmosphere of the movie, features original songs by blues guitarist and songwriter Roberto Ciotti as well as Italian evergreens from the 1970s such as L'anno che verrà by Lucio Dalla and La leva calcistica del '68 by Francesco De Gregori.

The screenplay was nominated for Premio Solinas.

== Plot ==
Marco (Bentivoglio) is visited at home by a girl named Teresa (Marsillach) who claims to be the girlfriend of Rudy (Massimo Venturiello), an old college and friend of Marco's. She tells Marco that Rudy has been jailed in Morocco for possession of hashish, and has sent her over to his old friends to collect the 30 million lire that are needed to bribe a judge and buy his acquittal.

Marco reconnects with two more members of the old company, Maurizio Ponchia (Abatantuono) and Paolino (Cederna), and they eventually resolve to bring the money to Rudy in Morocco in person. Ponchia, who is a used car dealer, provides a Mercedes offroad car for the journey, with a hiding spot for the money. Along the way, they also pick up Cedro, a fourth friend who has chosen to abandon everything and live in isolation somewhere on the Alps (inspired by the reading of Kerouac's Desolation Angels). Marco, Ponchia, Paolino, Cedro, and Teresa thus begin their journey through France and Spain and across the Strait of Gibraltar to Marrakesh.

Once in Marrakesh, the four men are shown around by Teresa while they are supposedly waiting for Rudy to get out of jail. Amongst other things, they experience a turkish bath and get a tattoo. Meanwhile Teresa disappears, and much to their dismay, they realize that the money and the car are also gone. At the time due for Rudy's liberation from jail, another Italian comes out in his place, Salvatore (Ugo Conti). He knows nothing about Rudy or Teresa, but helps them find out the truth. Rudy was never jailed, the whole story was a fabrication, and he actually lives in an oasis in the desert.

The friends resolve to search for Rudy, Teresa, and their money. Having lost their car, they have to adapt to travelling on a local bus and then by bike. As they try to cross the desert towards Rudy's oasis, fatigue and dehydration eventually knocks them off, but they are timely saved by Rudy himself who brings them to his place. Rudy reveals that he needed the 30 million to install a drill and start an orange plantation. After a first reaction of anger, the friends enjoy themselves participating in the installation and first activation of the drill, which finally finds water. This marks however also the end of their journey, and the time for going back their normal life and reality.

On their way back home, the four friends mention reuniting the group somehow (more specifically, reuniting the futsal team); but along the way their enthusiasm fades away as they realize that these aspirations are not going to be realised. The group finally disbands as Cedro and Paolino choose to stop over at Cedro's place in the Alps, and Marco and Ponchia drive back home alone.

== References in popular culture ==
In a scene, while they are on their way in Morocco, the company loses the pipe where the money is hidden. They then find out that the pipe has been taken by some Moroccans who use it as a pole for a soccer goal. As the Moroccans refuse to give the pipe back, it is eventually settled that it will be the trophy for those who win a soccer game. This scene is directly quoted by an analogous scene in the 1997 movie Tre uomini e una gamba ("Three men and a leg") by Italian comedians Aldo, Giovanni & Giacomo.

== Location ==
- Milan, Italy
- Saint-Tropez, France
- Barcelona, Spain
- Wilderness of Tabernas, Spain
- Marrakesh, Morocco
- Erfoud, Morocco
- Merzouga, Morocco
