= Giuseppe Cederna =

Italian actor and author (born 1957)

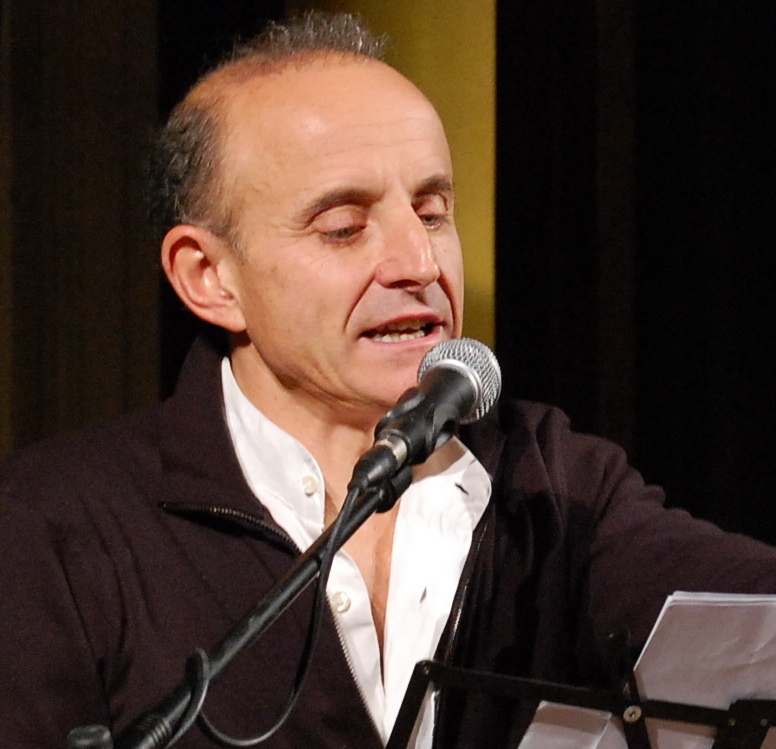
- Cederna in 2009
- Born: 25 June 1957 (age 68); Rome
- Occupation: Actor
- Height: 1.65 m (5 ft 5 in)

Giuseppe Cederna (born 25 June 1957) is an Italian actor and author.

== Life and career ==
Born in Rome, the son of the journalist and politician Antonio Cederna and nephew of the writer and journalist Camilla Cederna, from his youth Cederna was attracted by the profession of mime and clown, and after several theatrical experiences in 1977 he founded the company Anfeclown. Invited by the Teatro dell'Elfo for several collaborations, there Cederna met the director Gabriele Salvatores with whom he worked, on stage and later in films, including the Academy Award winner Mediterraneo.

After a minor role in the 1972 Marco Bellocchio's drama film Slap the Monster on Page One, in the 1980s Cederna started a career as a film character actor, in both brilliant and dramatic roles.

Cederna is a passionate about mountaineering and is also a writer.

== Partial filmography ==
- Dream of a Summer Night (1983)
- Mamma Ebe (1985) - Bruno Corradi
- Who Is Afraid Of Dracula? (1985)
- The American Bride (1986)
- Under the Chinese Restaurant (1987)
- Crystal or Ash, Fire or Wind, as Long as It's Love (1989)
- Marrakech Express (1989)
- Captain Fracassa's Journey (1990)
- Italia-Germania 4-3 (1990)
- Mediterraneo (1991)
- Gangsters (1992)
- A Soul Split in Two (1993)
- Love Burns (1994)
- Porzûs (1997)
- You Laugh (1998)
- Excellent Cadavers (1999)
- Johnny the Partisan (2000)
- El Alamein: The Line of Fire (2002)
- Ricordare Anna (2004)
- Different from Whom? (2009)
- Nine (2009)
- Men vs. Women (2010)
- Women vs. Men (2011)
- Garibaldi's Lovers (2012)
- Hammamet (2020)
- Marcel! (2022)
- Nuremberg (2025)
