= Frankenstein '80 =

- Italian film poster
- Directed by: Mario Mancini
- Screenplay by: Ferdinando De Leone; Mario Mancini
- Story by: Ferdinando De Leone
- Starring: John Richardson; Xiro Papas; Renato Romano; Dalila Parker; Anna Odessa; Bob Fiz; Renata Kasché; Dada Gallotti; Marisa Traversi; Enrico Rossi; Fulvio Mingozzi; Gordon Mitchell; Luigi Bonos
- Cinematography: Emilio Varriano
- Edited by: Enzo Micarelli
- Music by: Daniele Patucchi
- Production company: M.G.D. Film
- Distributed by: Variety Distribution
- Release date: 12 December 1972 (Italy)
- Running time: 89 minutes
- Country: Italy

Frankenstein '80 is a 1972 Italian film directed by Mario Mancini.

== Plot summary ==
By day, Dr. Frankenstein (Gordon Mitchell) works innocuously in his lab. But at night, he works to perfect Mosaic (Xiro Papas), a monstrosity pieced together from dead bodies. Once completed, the behemoth escapes from the lab and embarks on a killing spree. Local beauties begin popping up dead, murdered in a variety of gruesome ways, as authorities attempt to stop Mosaic's rampage.

== Cast ==
- John Richardson as Karl Schein
- Gordon Mitchell as Dr. Otto Frankenstein
- Renato Romano as Inspector Schneider
- Xiro Papas as Mosaic - the Frankenstein Monster
- Dalila Di Lazzaro as Sonia
- Roberto Fizz as Professor Schwarz
- Dada Gallotti as Butcher
- Marisa Traversi as Second Prostitute
- Lemmy Carson as Head Nurse
- Marco Mariani as Track Spectator
- Luigi Bonos as Hobo
- Enrico Rossi as First Investigator
- Fulvio Mingozzi as Second Investigator
- Umberto Amambrini as Vice Straus
- Luigi Antonio Guerra as Agent
- Anna Odessa as Stripper
- Renata Kasché as Redhead

== Production ==
Despite the film's title alluding to Mary Shelley's character, the film has little in common with her creation. The inspiration of Ferdinando De Leone and Mario Mancini's script was from the adult only comics such as Oltretomba. Future Academy Awards winner Carlo Rambaldi provided the special effects in the film such as the monster named Mosaic. Curti referred to the special effects as "crude" and was an "early hint of the tendency towards excess that will characterise Italian genre cinema of the decade"

Lou Castel was originally going to act in the film but was not allowed after being expelled from Italy in April 1972 due to his political views. Actor Gordon Mitchell stated that parts of the film were possibly shot in Bavaria, but not any of the scenes he was involved in. The rest of the film was shot in Munich and Rome.

== Release ==
Frankenstein '80 was released in Italy on 12 December 1972 where it was distributed by Les Films 2R Roma. Film historian Roberto Curti stated that the film "passed almost unnoticed in Italy at the time of its release" A photonovel version of the film was released in the Italian issue of Cinesex in May 1973.

As of 2017, the film is in the public domain in the United States.

== Reception ==
From retrospective reviews, AllMovie called the film "stupid, sickening, and obscene", but "seekers of psychotronic cinema will have a field day with this ridiculous Italian exploitation product." In his book on Italian horror film directors, Louis Paul referred to the film as "strange" and "a lurid sex film dressed as a horror movie."
