= Luigi Montini =

Italian actor

- Born: 24 February 1934 (age 92); Milan, Italy
- Occupation: Actor
- Years active: 1962-2017

Luigi Montini (born 24 February 1934) is an Italian actor in over a hundred films and TV shows since 1962.

== Selected filmography ==
Year	Title	Role	Notes
1968	Satanik	Dodo La Roche	
1972	The Hassled Hooker	Police Superintendent	
1976	Lezioni di violoncello con toccata e fuga	Taxi driver	
1979	Life Is Beautiful		
1980	The Blue-Eyed Bandit	Brigadeer Mannella	
1982	Il tifoso, l'arbitro e il calciatore	Dr. Moroni	
1988	The Third Solution		
1990	On Tour	Pavia	
1991	Mediterraneo	Pope	
1991	The Invisible Wall	Air Force General	
1999	Li chiamarono... briganti!		
2007	Don't Waste Your Time, Johnny!	Discografico	
