= Isola del Liri =

- Comune
- Comune di Isola del Liri
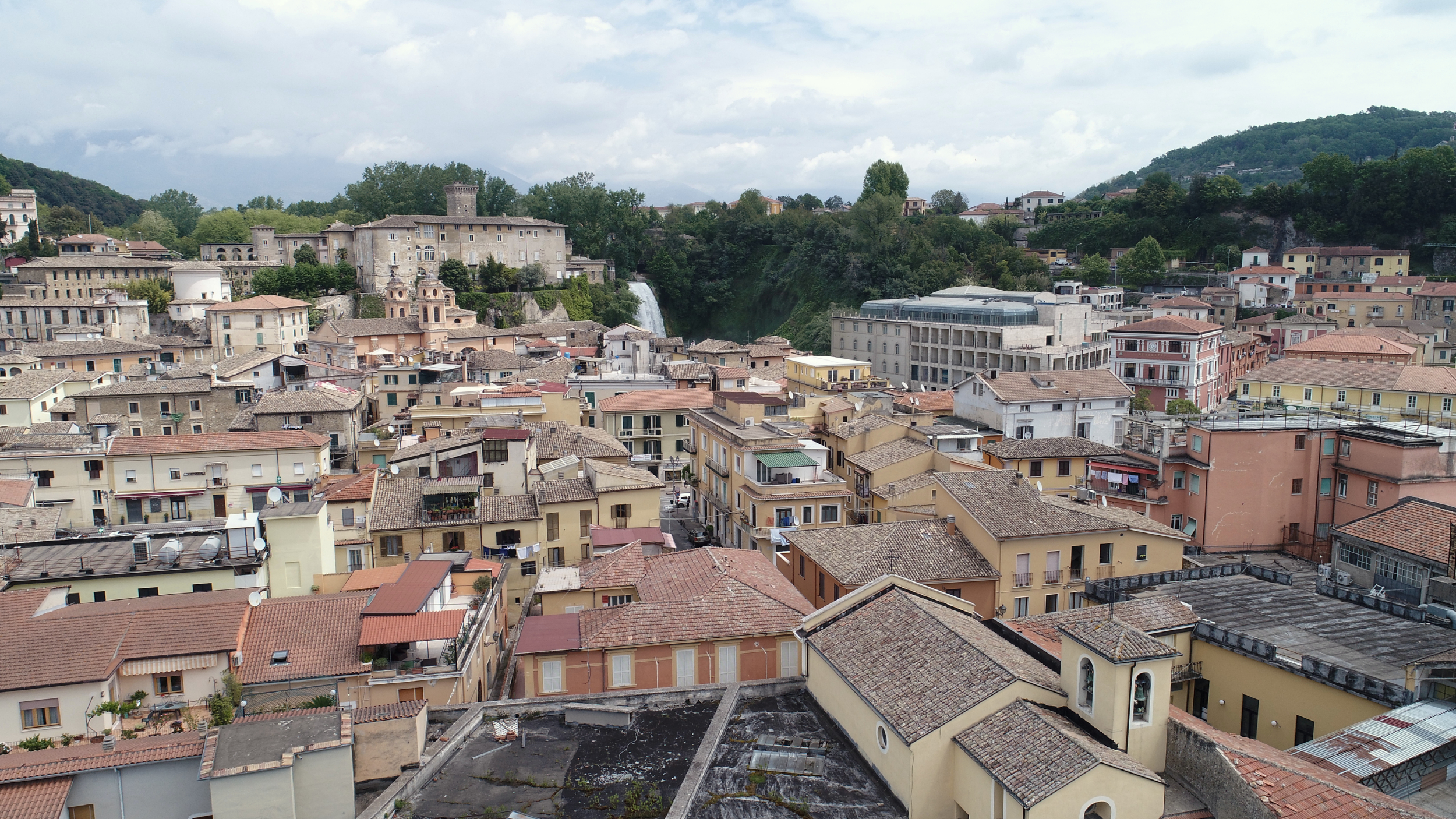
- View of Isola del Liri

- Coat of arms

- Location within Italy Location within Lazio
- Coordinates: 41°40′46″N 13°34′22″E
- Country: Italy
- Region: Lazio
- Province: Frosinone (FR)
- Frazioni: Borgo Nuovo, Capitino, Capitino San Paolo, San Domenico, Selva Alta, Selva Forlì, Via Maria, Pirandello

Government
  - Mayor: Massimiliano Quadrini since 10-6-2024

Area
  - Total: 16 km^{2} (6.2 sq mi)
- Elevation: 217 m (712 ft)

Population (31 August 2017)
  - Total: 11,516
  - Density: 720/km^{2} (1,900/sq mi)
- Demonym: Isolani
- Time zone: UTC+1 (CET)
  - Summer (DST): UTC+2 (CEST)
- Postal code: 03036
- Dialing code: 0776
- Patron saint: Madonna of Loreto
- Website: Official website

Isola del Liri (simply known as Isola Liri, Campanian: Lisera) is an Italian town of Lazio, in the province of Frosinone. As its name implies, Isola is situated between two arms of the Liri. The many waterfalls of this river and of the Fibreno are used by factories.

== History ==
Of Volscan origin, after the fall of the Western Roman Empire Isola del Liri was ruled by the Byzantines and then the Lombards.

In the early Middle Ages the town was, alternatively, under the rule of the Byzantines and the Lombards, until it became part of the county of Sora in the Principality of Capua. Isola del Liri was the feud of the dell'Isola (de Insulae) family from the 12th century to the 14th century. Members of the family include Roffredo dell'Isola, Abbot of Monte Cassino, Count d'Arce, and Bartholomew dell'Isola who enjoyed the honors in the seat of Capuano Naples. At the end of the 14th century, Isola del Liri was ceded to the Cantelmo family.

Later it was part of the Duchy of Sora, becoming a ducal seat under the Boncompagni family. In 1796 it was annexed to the Papal States.

It was once in the old Terra di Lavoro region of Campania, but was transferred to the Lazio during the Fascist period.

== Main sights ==
The town's main sight is the Castello Boncompagni-Viscogliosi, a fortified palace near two waterfalls, Cascata Grande and Cascata del Valcatoio, each about 30 metres (98 ft) high, and a bridge on river. It is mentioned for the first time in 1100. After the acquisition of the Duchy of Sora by the della Rovere family, it became one of their main residences. It was also housed by their successors as dukes, the Boncompagni; in the 17th century Costanza Sforza turned into a luxurious palace, with biblica frescoes and basreliefs of the duchy's lands, as well as a garden.

About 2 kilometres (1.2 mi) north of the town is the church of San Domenico, erected in the 12th century, which is said to mark the site of the villa of Cicero.

== Culture ==
The official logo of the Liri Blues Festival.

Isola del Liri is the seat of the eponymous blues festival since 1988. Liri Blues is an international festival has been free ever since its first year. Liri Blues is an event that happens every year during a week in July. Concerts are held in the main square (Piazza Boncompagni), in the streets and jam sessions happen late at night.

In 1997, for the 10th edition of the festival, the town of Isola del Liri signed a twinning with the city of New Orleans (Louisiana, USA).

== Twin towns ==
- New Orleans, United States

== See also ==
- Liri Blues Festival
- Province of Frosinone
- Liri
- Eustachio Pisani
