= The Blue-Eyed Bandit =

- Original theatrical poster
- Directed by: Alfredo Giannetti
- Written by: Alfredo Giannetti
- Starring: Franco Nero; Dalila Di Lazzaro
- Cinematography: Giuseppe Maccari
- Music by: Ennio Morricone
- Release date: 7 August 1980
- Running time: 96 min.
- Country: Italy
- Language: Italian

Il bandito dagli occhi azzurri (internationally released as The Blue-Eyed Bandit) is a 1980 Italian poliziottesco film written and directed by Alfredo Giannetti. It marked the film debut of Fabrizio Bentivoglio.

== Plot ==
Renzo Dominici is an accountant for a company in Genoa, apparently lame and in poor health; in reality he is pretending to be in order to be able to carry out a robbery in the company without being recognized, and to disguise himself he uses a wedge in his shoe to limp, a brown wig and brown contact lenses to hide his blue eyes.

In the days before the blow, Renzo first comes into contact with Riccardo, a homosexual boy who works in a sauna, and after he has discovered him stealing in his wallet, he falls in love with him and follows him, being able to recognize him by the scent, and later with Stella, the young and attractive maid of the canteen of the company where he works, bored by the ménage he entertains with the head of the canteen and with another assistant, who tries to seduce him but is rejected.

Renzo organizes the robbery in all the details, including the escape from Italy, also bribing a port employee to board a transport ship that will sail to Panama. The day when there is a large amount of money in the company, Renzo carries out the robbery with his face covered, stealing the sum of two billion lire from the safe, dropping his sunglasses and uncovering his eyes, which due to their peculiarity become a sort of legend for the media and the bandit has since been called "the blue-eyed bandit".

The police at first are clueless, but, due to some unforeseen events, some people who know Renzo begin to suspect him and endanger his cover: during the escape through the dungeons, where Stella is flirting with her lover, he drops a lighter which is picked up by her, and, remembering having seen it in his office when she went to bring him lunch, she reports it to the head of the canteen; together they go searching for clues in his office but are seen by Renzo who from that moment will try to eliminate them: the first will die locked up in the cold room, while the girl will be spared after being stunned.

Two other people are aware of his role in the robbery: one of the company's security guards, who identified him thanks to the cufflinks of his shirt that he also wore during the action, who, after having searched his home, claims a part of the loot but Renzo will kill him before going to recover the money. The second is Riccardo who recognized him after seeing him take off his glasses in the sauna, without reporting it to the police, who stopped him as a suspect, and also attempting, with the help of two accomplices, to steal the stolen goods but Renzo will be able to neutralize them before escaping.

The last unexpected event is represented by the mother, hospitalized in a psychiatric clinic and whom he occasionally visits, who seeing the identikit of the bandit in the newspaper, immediately recognizes him as the son in front of the nurse nun, who immediately warns the police. giving the man's name and surname but Renzo, using a secret passage in his house, manages to get away before being captured, managing to board the ship for Panama and, in the last scene, waking up on the deck, receives breakfast by a sailor, rewarding him with a generous tip.

== Cast ==
- Franco Nero as Renzo Dominici
- Dalila Di Lazzaro as Stella
- Carlos de Carvalho as Police Commissioner
- Pierfrancesco Poggi as Stella's Lover
- Luigi Montini as Brigadeer Mannella
- Sergio Tabor as Palamitessa
- Jole Fierro as Renzo's Mother
- Fabrizio Bentivoglio as Riccardo aka Rick
- Paolo Maria Scalondro as Policeman
- Franco Javarone as Watchman
- Mickey Knox as De Biase

== Reception ==
The film was described as "old fashioned and pleasantly cartoonish."

== See also ==
- List of Italian films of 1980
