= Leopoldo Mastelloni =

Italian actor, comedian, and singer

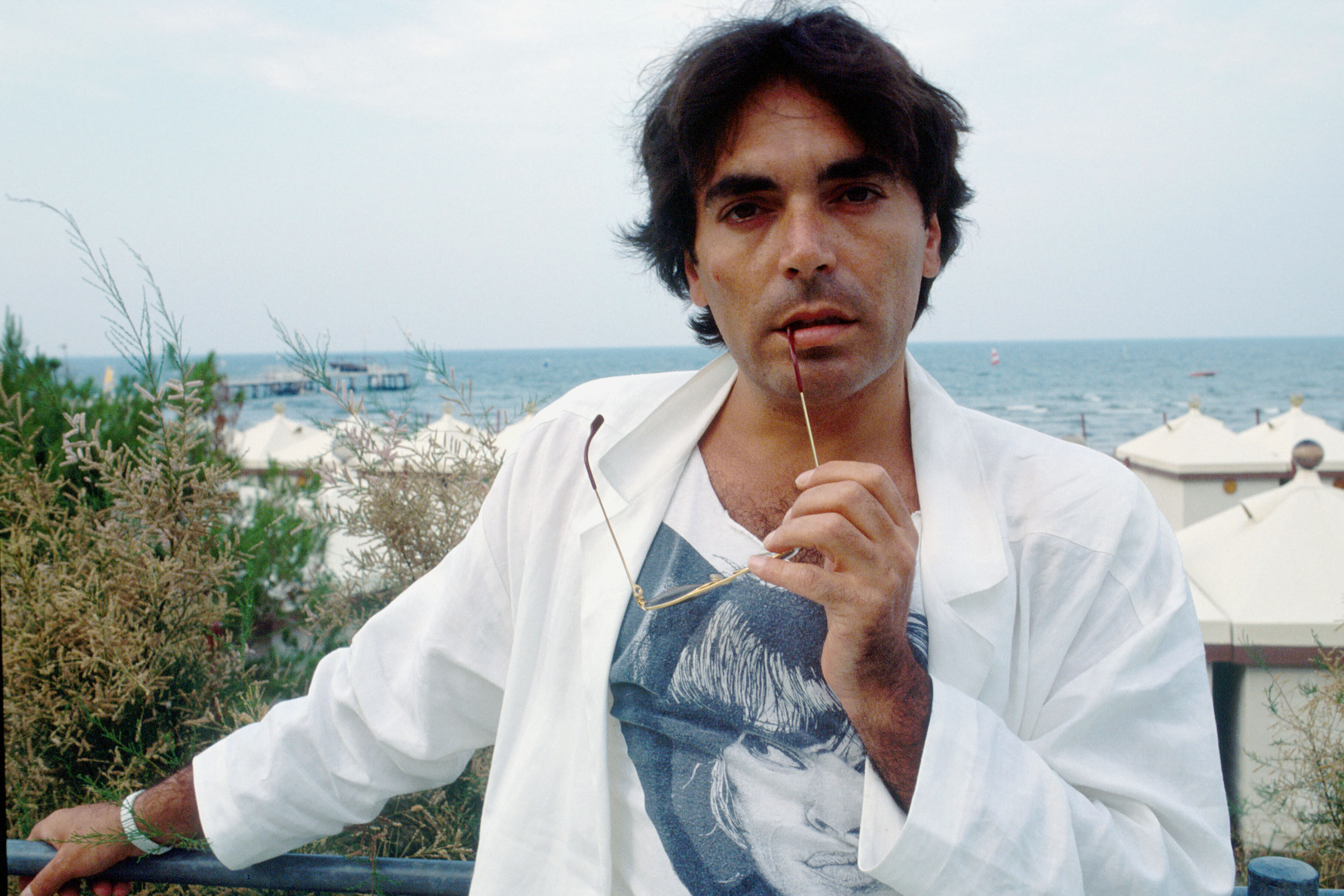
- Born: 12 July 1945 (age 80); Naples
- Occupations: Actor, singer
- Years active: 1965–present

Leopoldo Mastelloni (born 12 July 1945) is an Italian actor, comedian and singer.

== Biography ==
Born in Naples, Mastelloni made his debut in his hometown, performing in theatre and cabaret. He got his first success on television with the RAI variety show Giochiamo al varietà directed by Antonello Falqui. In films, he is best known for the role of butler John in Dario Argento's Inferno.

== Filmography ==
Year	Title	Role	Notes
1972	Gang War in Naples	Cardillo - Prisoner	
1975	Sex Pot	Singer in Drag	
1976	Frou-frou del tabarin	The Choreographer	Uncredited
1978	To Be Twenty	Arguinas	
1978	Napoli serenata calibro 9	Transsexual	
1980	Inferno	John, the Butler	
1981	Per favore, occupati di Amelia	Adone	
1981	Culo e camicia	Alberto Maria Saracino	
1982	Canto d'amore		
1987	Barbablù, Barbablù	Beniamino	
1988	The Third Solution	Father Isidoro	(final film role)
