= Eustachio Pisani =

Italian entrepreneur

- Born: September 15, 1866; Sant'Elia Fiumerapido, Kingdom of Italy
- Died: March 10, 1947 (aged 80); Isola del Liri, Italy
- Occupation: Entrepreneur
- Known for: Owner and managing director of Ditta Ippolito & Pisani
- Spouse: Speranza Ippolito
- Awards: Cavaliere del Lavoro (1916)

Eustachio Pisani (Sant'Elia Fiumerapido, 15 September 1866 – Isola del Liri, 10 March 1947) was an Italian entrepreneur.

== Biography ==
Orphaned at an early age, he divided himself between working during the day and studying in the evening.

In 1892, after completing his military service, he moved to Isola del Liri, where he was hired at the Cartiere Meridionali as an assistant until he became head of manufacture.

After marrying Speranza Ippolito, heir of the Lanificio Ippolito, he took over the leadership, changing its name, in 1901, to Ditta Ippolito & Pisani. In a few years he expanded the production plant which went from 560 square meters (6,000 sq ft) to 11,000 square meters (120,000 sq ft), exploiting the waters of the Liri river for the production of electricity through the construction of a derivation canal. The production was gradually adapted to the flourishing paper industry in the area, with felts for technical articles of excellent quality, so much so that they were also in demand abroad. His merits in the entrepreneurial field were recognized in 1916, when he was awarded the title of Cavaliere del Lavoro.

In 1935, he was chosen as the representative of the Province of Frosinone in the General Council of the Banco di Napoli and decorated with a Gold Medal of Merit.

In 1945, he was called to be part of the Regency Committee in the management of the General Confederation of Italian Industry for central-southern Italy.

He paid subsidies in the event of seniority, disability or illness, guaranteeing an indemnity to those who left their work at the Feltrificio Ippolito & Pisani for any reason and granting three days of bonuses at Christmas and Easter to allow employees to celebrate anniversaries with loved ones. He donated a large sum of money for the construction of the hospital in Isola del Liri, as well as taking care of getting electricity and drinking water to many districts of the country that did not have them and building buildings to give a home to his less well-off employees.

== Honours and awards ==
- Cavaliere del lavoro, "Merits in entrepreneurship", 9 January 1916
- Cavaliere dell'Ordine della Corona d'Italia, 21 December 1911
- Grande Ufficiale dell'Ordine della Corona d'Italia, 19 January 1940
