= The American Bride =

1986 film by Giovanni Soldati

- Directed by: Giovanni Soldati
- Written by: Mario Soldati; Gino Capone; Brian Freilino
- Starring: Thommy Berggren; Stefania Sandrelli
- Cinematography: Romano Albani
- Music by: Gino Paoli
- Release date: 1986
- Running time: 92 minutes
- Languages: Italian; English

The American Bride (Italian: La sposa americana) is a 1986 Italian romance film written and directed by Giovanni Soldati. It is based on the novel with the same name written by the director's father.

== Plot ==
Edoardo, a young professor of literature, is married to the Czechoslovak-American Edith, but he betrays her with her sister who is married to the homosexual Sacha.

== Cast ==
- Stefania Sandrelli : Anna
- Thommy Berggren : Edoardo
- Harvey Keitel : Sacha
- Trudie Styler : Edith
- Richard Borg
- Florence Sheppard
- Mike Metzel
- Giuseppe Cederna
- Giovanni Lombardo Radice
