= Dalila Di Lazzaro =

Italian model, actress and writer (born 1953)

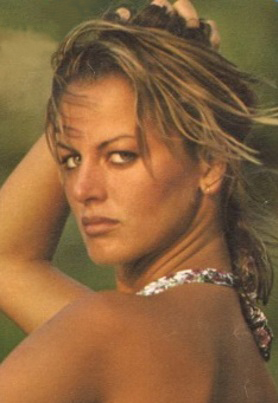
- Di Lazzaro in 1975
- Born: 29 January 1953 (age 73); Udine, Italy
- Other name: Dalila Parker
- Occupations: Actress; model; writer
- Years active: 1972–2015

Dalila Di Lazzaro (born 29 January 1953) is an Italian model, actress and writer.

== Life and career ==
Born in Udine, Di Lazzaro started as a fashion model and was the subject of famous photographers such as Andy Warhol. She then gained attention in the tabloid press as a supposed relative of Sophia Loren and even a potential rival in love.

Between the mid-1970s and the early 1980s Di Lazzaro worked in notable films with directors such as Alberto Lattuada, Luigi Comencini, Florestano Vancini, Alberto Sordi, Dario Argento, Klaus Kinski and Jacques Deray, then focused primarily on television. In 1983 she refused the role of Domino, later played by Kim Basinger, in Never Say Never Again.

In 1997 she was involved in a motorcycle crash on a Rome street which caused a fracture of a vertebra in her neck. The result was chronic pain which severely limited her career.

Her last role in a movie was in 2015 in 80 Voglia di te, directed by Andrea Vialardi.

She considers herself Catholic.

== Partial filmography ==
- 1972: It Can Be Done Amigo
- 1972: Il sindacalista - Girl at New Year's Eve party (uncredited)
- 1972: Your Vice Is a Locked Room and Only I Have the Key - Stripper (uncredited)
- 1972: The Scientific Cardplayer - Nurse (uncredited)
- 1972: Frankenstein 80 - Sonia
- 1973: Canterbury n° 2 - Nuove storie d'amore del '300 - Blonde Girl on the Beach (uncredited)
- 1973: Da Scaramouche or se vuoi l'assoluzione baciar devi sto... cordone! - Granduchessa Olimpia
- 1973: Andy Warhol's Frankenstein - Female Monster
- 1974: The Beast - Magda
- 1975: Sex Pot - Anna Chino
- 1975: Night Train Murders - Nurse Pauline (uncredited)
- 1976: Oh, Serafina! - Serafina Vitali
- 1976: L'Italia s'è rotta - Domenica Chiaregato
- 1977: Three Tigers Against Three Tigers - La Contessa
- 1977: The Cat - Wanda Yukovich
- 1978: The Pyjama Girl Case - Glenda Blythe
- 1978: The Last Romantic Lover - Dalila Di Lazzaro, la star
- 1979: Mimi - Therese
- 1980: Stark System - Lauda
- 1980: The Blue-Eyed Bandit - Stella
- 1980: Eugenio - Fernanda
- 1980: Three Men to Kill - Béa
- 1981: Quando la coppia scoppia - Angela - Enrico's wife
- 1981: Prima che sia troppo presto - Janet D'Angelo
- 1982: Una di troppo - Andrea Cooper
- 1982: Miss Right - Art Student
- 1984: Everybody in Jail - Singer Iris Del Monte
- 1985: Phenomena - Headmistress
- 1985: Killer contro killer - Cherry
- 1987: Sicilian Connection - Secretary
- 1989: Paganini - Helene von Feuerbach
- 1989: Spogliando Valeria - Eva
- 1990: Breath of Life - Teresa
- 1990: Alcune signore per bene - Allegra
- 1991: Strepitosamente... flop - Carla
- 1991: L'ulivo e l'alloro
- 1992: Dov'era lei a quell'ora? - Lucia
- 1993: Rose rosse per una squillo
- 1998: Kidnapping - La sfida (TV Movie) - Avvocato Iorio
- 1998: Mashamal - ritorno al deserto - Veruska
- 2013: The Fifth Wheel - Signora veneta
- 2015: 80 Voglia di te - (final film role)
