= The Third Solution =

- Directed by: Pasquale Squitieri
- Screenplay by: Pasquale Squitieri; Valerio Riva; Robert Balchus
- Story by: Enzo Russo; Mario Cecchi Gori; Pasquale Squitieri
- Produced by: Mario Cecchi Gori; Vittorio Cecchi Gori
- Starring: Treat Williams
- Cinematography: Giuseppe Tinelli
- Music by: Renato Serio
- Production companies: Cecchi Gori Group; RAI
- Distributed by: Columbia Pictures
- Release date: 1988
- Country: Italy
- Language: English

The Third Solution (Italian: Russicum - I giorni del diavolo, also known as Russicum) is a 1988 Italian crime-thriller film written and directed by Pasquale Squitieri and starring Treat Williams.

== Cast ==
- Treat Williams as Mark Hendrix
- F. Murray Abraham as Father Carafa
- Danny Aiello as George Sherman
- Rita Rusic as Alexandra
- Robert Balchus as Michael Wessling
- Rossano Brazzi as Marini
- Nigel Court as Father Hanema
- Leopoldo Mastelloni as Father Isidoro
- Luigi Montini
- Rada Rassimov
- María Baxa
- Franco Diogene
- Lorenzo Piani
