= On Tour (1990 film) =

1990 film

- Film poster
- Directed by: Gabriele Salvatores
- Written by: Francesca Marciano; Alessandro Vivarelli; Fabrizio Bentivoglio; Paolo Virzì
- Produced by: Vittorio Cecchi Gori; Gianni Minervini
- Starring: Diego Abatantuono
- Cinematography: Italo Petriccione
- Edited by: Nino Baragli
- Music by: Roberto Ciotti
- Release date: 6 April 1990
- Running time: 91 minutes
- Country: Italy
- Language: Italian

On Tour (Italian: Turnè) is a 1990 Italian comedy-drama film directed by Gabriele Salvatores. It was screened in the Un Certain Regard section at the 1990 Cannes Film Festival. It is the second installment of Salvatores' "escape trilogy", after Marrakech Express; like its predecessor, it is a road movie, and features Diego Abatantuono playing the protagonist.

== Plot ==
Two thirty-five-year-old actors, Dario and Federico, friends since school, set off on a "tour" from Apulia to Emilia Romagna to play "The Cherry Orchard" by Anton Chekhov. Extroverted and with precise cinematographic ambitions, Dario tries to encourage the introverted Federico, now depressed because neglected by Vittoria, a radio announcer. She, unbeknownst to Federico, is romantically linked with Dario, to whom she gave the unpleasant task of informing his friend. Concerned by the state of prostration of Federico, who continually messes up theatrical performances, Dario hides the truth from him. Disappointed by this situation, Vittoria, after having reached them, confesses that she loves both, who seem to complement each other. Disconcerted by the behavior of the woman and a failed project of a film, Dario and Federico decide to give up the woman who has set them against each other and, unexpectedly, abandon by mutual agreement the precarious profession of actor going, still friends, to the fortune.

== Cast ==
- Diego Abatantuono as Dario Nigri
- Fabrizio Bentivoglio as Federico Lolli
- Laura Morante as Vittoria
- Luigi Montini as Leonardo Pavia (credited as Gigi Montini)
- Barbara Scoppa as Olimpia
- Ugo Conti as Attilio
- Eva Vanicek as Ida Florio
- Leonardo Gajo as Mattia
- Giovanni Bosich as Gobetti
- Isabella Perricone as Margherita
- Nini Salerno as Peruzzi
- Claudio Bisio as Tank station man
- Piero Vivarelli as The American
