= Roberto Ciotti =

Italian blues musician and composer

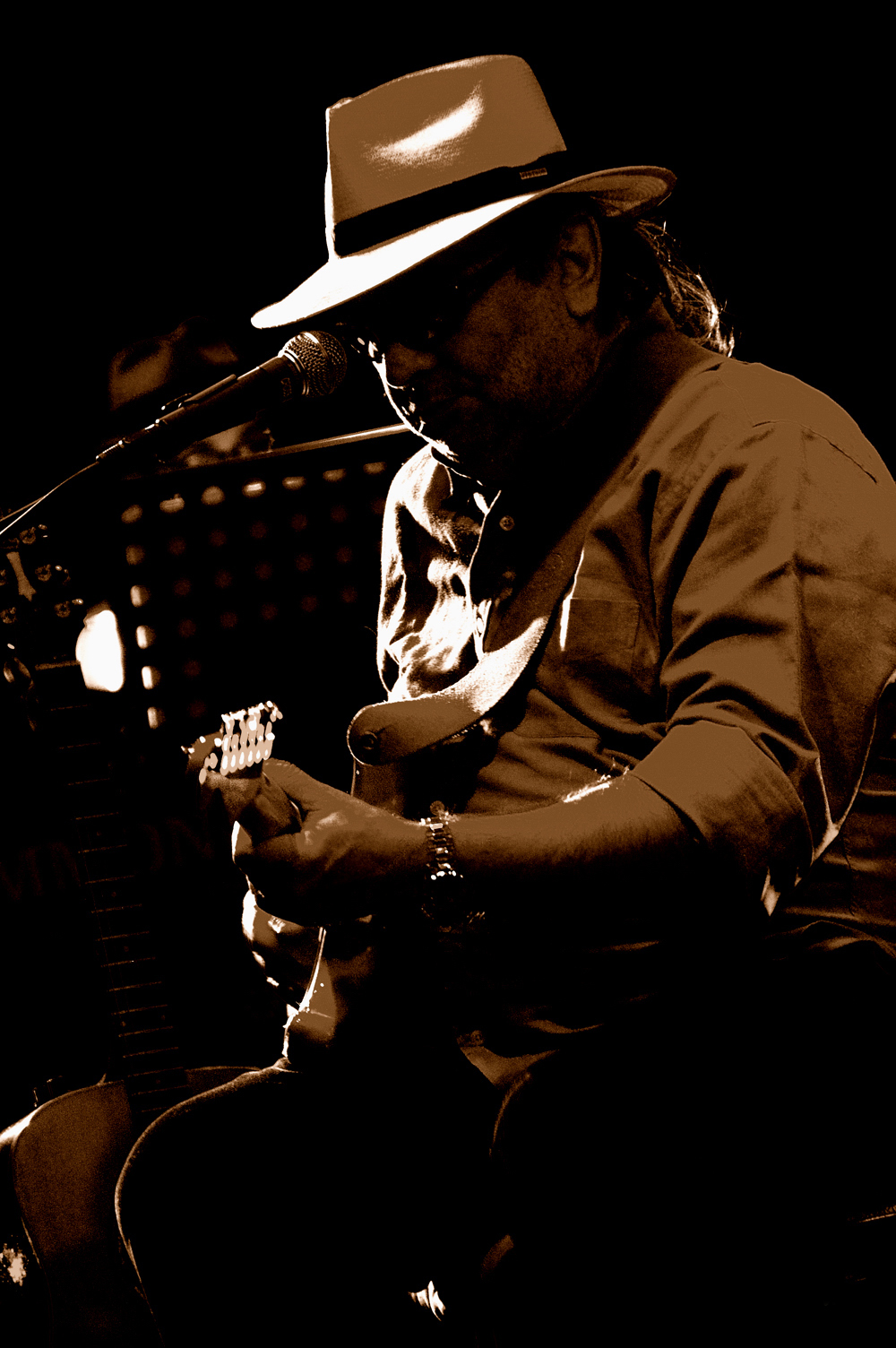
- Roberto Ciotti in 2010
- Born: 20 February 1953; Rome
- Died: 31 December 2013 (aged 60); Rome
- Occupations: Musician, composer

Roberto Ciotti (20 February 1953 – 31 December 2013) was an Italian blues musician, composer and guitarist.

== Life and career ==
Born in Rome, Ciotti began playing the guitar at the age of 12. From 1970 to 1972 he was a member of the jazz band Blue Morning, then he started a solo career as a bluesman, a composer and a professional guitarist, collaborating with Chet Baker, Francesco De Gregori and Edoardo Bennato, among others.

His debut album was Supergasoline Blues, released in 1978. In 1980, he opened the Italian concerts of Bob Marley. In 1989 he got critical and commercial success with the musical score of Marrakech Express by Gabriele Salvatores, with whom he collaborated again two years later in On Tour. After the 2002 album Behind the Door he devoted himself mainly to the live concerts. In 2006 he published an autobiography, Unplugged, in which he recounted the difficulty of coherence in doing blues without ever yielding to the lure of show business and easy money.

Following a long illness, Ciotti died on 31 December 2013, at the age of 60.

== Discography ==
=== Albums ===
- Supergasoline Blues (1978, Cramps, 5205 751)
- Bluesman (1979, Cramps, 5205 752)
- Rockin' Blues (1982, RCA Italiana)
- No More Blue (1989)
- Road 'n' Rail (1992)
- Marrakech Express - Turné (1992)
- King of Nothing (1994)
- Changes(1996)
- Walking (1999, Il Manifesto)
- Behind the Door (2002)
- Troubles & Dreams (2010)
- Equilibrio Precario (2013)
