= Mediterraneo =

- Original release poster
- Directed by: Gabriele Salvatores
- Written by: Enzo Monteleone
- Based on: The novel Sagapò by Renzo Biasion
- Produced by: Mario Cecchi Gori; Vittorio Cecchi Gori; Gianni Minervini
- Starring: Diego Abatantuono; Claudio Bigagli; Giuseppe Cederna; Claudio Bisio
- Cinematography: Italo Petriccione
- Edited by: Nino Baragli
- Music by: Giancarlo Bigazzi; Marco Falagiani
- Distributed by: Variety Distribution
- Release date: 31 January 1991
- Running time: 96 minutes
- Country: Italy
- Languages: Italian; English; Greek
- Box office: US$4.5 million

Mediterraneo is a 1991 Italian war comedy-drama film directed by Gabriele Salvatores and written by Enzo Monteleone. The film is set during World War II and concerns a group of Italian soldiers, who become stranded on an island of the Italian Dodecanese in the Aegean Sea, and are left behind by the war. It won the Academy Award for Best Foreign Language Film in 1992.

== Plot ==
In 1941, one year after Italy joined Germany against the Allies in World War II, a small group of misfit Italian soldiers is sent to Megisti, a small Greek island in the Aegean Sea, for four months of lookout duty. The soldiers include a lieutenant who likes art, a macho sergeant, a ski instructor accompanied by his beloved donkey Silvana, and other quirky people. They are not very good soldiers, but a cross-section of average, independent men. The catchphrase "One face, one race" occurs throughout the story.

Expecting an attack, the soldiers take many inept precautions. They find a small town with no people. That night, they see bombing on the horizon, and, by radio interception, discover that the ship that was intended to pick them up has been destroyed. Mysteriously, people reappear in the village; the villagers say they hid because the Germans had taken all the men, but having seen that the Italians are harmless, they have decided to return to their normal lives. It's not long before everyone's sunny nature appears. The Italian soldiers, unacquainted with a war they clearly do not sense as theirs, are absorbed into the life, heat, and landscape of the idyllic island.

The local Orthodox priest befriends the lieutenant, an amateur painter, and asks him to restore the murals in his church. Meanwhile, two soldiers, who are brothers, befriend a young woman who is a shepherdess. They eventually consummate their friendship with the shepherdess, who in turn loves them equally. Sergeant Lo Russo, the only member of the crew with a fiery spirit for war, takes up folk dancing and begins to reflect on his place in the universe. Meanwhile, the shyest soldier, Farina, falls in love with the island's prostitute named Vasilissa. The two get married and remain on the island to pursue Vasilissa's dream of opening a restaurant. The rest of the group returns to Italy.

In their old age, three of the men are reunited on the island after visiting the tomb of Vasilissa, who had died.

== Cast ==
- Diego Abatantuono as Sgt. Nicola Lo Russo, a North African Campaign veteran.
- Claudio Bigagli as Lt. Raffaele Montini, a former Latin and Greek school teacher and amateur painter.
- Giuseppe Cederna as Pvt. Antonio Farina, Montini's batman.
- Claudio Bisio as Pvt. Corrado Noventa, a former deserter.
- Luigi Alberti as Pvt. Eliseo Strazzabosco, a muleteer and former ski teacher.
- Ugo Conti as Pvt. Luciano Colasanti, a radio operator.
- Memo Dini as Pvt. Libero Munaron, an Alpino from Veneto.
- Vasco Mirandola as Pvt. Felice Munaron, an Alpino from Veneto.
- Antonio Catania as Lt. Carmelo La Rosa, a Sicilian aviator.
- Vana Barba (credited as Vanna Barba) as Vasilissa, a Greek prostitute.
- Luigi Montini as Orthodox priest.
- Irene Grazioli as shepherdess.
- Alessandro Vivarelli as Aziz, a Turkish merchant.

== Production ==
The film's producers are Penta Film, A.M.A. Film, Silvio Berlusconi Communications and Cecchi Gori Group Tiger Cinematografica.

The script was written by Enzo Monteleone and is loosely based on the 1954 autobiographical novel Sagapò by Renzo Biasion (with Sagapò meaning "I love you" in the Greek language); the script and novel show marked differences in how they portray the Italian army in Greece, with the novel giving a more realistic account of both.

Filming took place in the Greek Dodecanese on the island of Kastellórizo.

== Release ==
Mediterraneo was released in Italy on 31 January 1991 by Penta Distribuzione before premiering at the 1991 Toronto International Film Festival on 9 September 1991, where its North American distribution rights were purchased by Miramax Films. Internationally, the film was truncated by 10 minutes, resulting in an 86-minute cut.

The film was submitted as the Italian entry for the Academy Award for Best Foreign Language Film in November 1991. It was released in the United States in March 1992, a week before the Academy Awards, and made its worldwide run over the next two years.

== Reception ==
=== Box office ===
The film grossed US$4.5 million in the United States and Canada, and was the highest-grossing non-English language film at the US box office that year, but was later surpassed by Indochine, which was released at Christmas 1992 and grossed most of its revenue in 1993.

=== Critical response ===
Mediterraneo was received mostly positively by film critics. On the review aggregator website Rotten Tomatoes, the film has an 80% score, based on 15 reviews, with an average rating of 6.4/10.

Several critics linked the movie to the tradition of Italian neorealism. Nevertheless, the victory of the Academy Award raised some eyebrows, with The Washington Post describing the movie as a "schmaltzy island fantasy", and the Film Journal calling it a "clichéd number". Roger Ebert claimed that this was the only film he ever walked out of because it was "utterly without redeeming merit". However, he previously wrote that he had walked out of films like Jonathan Livingston Seagull and Caligula.

Among historians, the movie was discussed as a prime example of the myth of Italiani brava gente, the popular Italian belief that Italian soldiers were not complicit in war crimes and had distinguished themselves through humanity and compassion during World War II — in stark contrast to their ideologically motivated and brutal German allies. It has been argued that the movie does not make any reference to the atrocities committed by Italians during the Axis occupation of Greece while portraying Royal Italian Army soldiers as essentially good-natured people, if not innocent buffoons. In reality, the burning of villages, shooting of civilians, and rapes were common features of the Italian occupation. However, the film shows Italian aggressors mingling with the locals and even establishing consensual erotic relationships with Greek women.

=== Awards ===
It won the Academy Award for Best Foreign Language Film in 1992.

| Award | Category | Recipient(s) | Result |
|---|---|---|---|
| David di Donatello Awards | Best Film | Gabriele Salvatores, Mario Cecchi Gori, Vittorio Cecchi Gori, and Gianni Minervini | Won |
| David di Donatello Awards | Best Editing | Nino Baragli | Won |
| David di Donatello Awards | Best Sound | Tiziano Crotti | Won |
| David di Donatello Awards | Best Director | Gabriele Salvatores | Nominated |
| David di Donatello Awards | Best Actor | Diego Abatantuono | Nominated |
| David di Donatello Awards | Best Supporting Actor | Giuseppe Cederna | Nominated |
| David di Donatello Awards | Best Supporting Actress | Vana Barba | Nominated |
| David di Donatello Awards | Best Screenplay | Enzo Monteleone | Nominated |
| David di Donatello Awards | Best Producer | Mario and Vittorio Cecchi Gori and Gianni Minervini | Nominated |
| David di Donatello Awards | Best Cinematography | Italo Petriccione | Nominated |
| David di Donatello Awards | Best Score | Giancarlo Bigazzi and Marco Falagiani | Nominated |
| David di Donatello Awards | Best Costume Design | Francesco Panni | Nominated |
| Globo d'oro | Best Film | Gabriele Salvatores, Mario Cecchi Gori, Vittorio Cecchi Gori, and Gianni Minervini | Nominated |
| Globo d'oro | Best Music | Giancarlo Bigazzi and Marco Falagiani | Won |
| Nastro d'argento | Best Director | Gabriele Salvatores | Won |
| Nastro d'argento | Best Producer | Mario and Vittorio Cecchi Gori and Gianni Minervini | Nominated |
| Nastro d'argento | Best Story | Enzo Monteleone | Nominated |
| Nastro d'argento | Best Screenplay | Enzo Monteleone | Nominated |
| Nastro d'argento | Best Actor | Diego Abatantuono | Nominated |
| Nastro d'argento | Best Supporting Actor | Giuseppe Cederna | Nominated |
| Ciak d'oro | Best Actor | Diego Abatantuono | Won |
| Ciak d'oro | Best Supporting Actor | Giuseppe Cederna | Nominated |
| Ciak d'oro | Best On-Set Sound | Tiziano Crotti | Nominated |

== See also ==
- Captain Corelli's Mandolin, a 2001 war film set on the Greek Island of Cephalonia.
- List of submissions to the 64th Academy Awards for Best Foreign Language Film
- List of Italian submissions for the Academy Award for Best Foreign Language Film

== Bibliography ==
- Giovacchini, Saverio (21 November 2007). "Soccer with the Dead: Mediterraneo and the Myth of Italiani Brava Gente". In Paris, Michael (ed.). Repicturing the Second World War: Representations in Film and Television. Springer. ISBN 978-0-230-59258-2.
