= The Wolf Man (franchise) =

American horror/adventure film series

- Directed by: George Waggner (1); Roy William Neill (2); Erle C. Kenton (3–4); Charles Barton (5); Joe Johnston (2010); Leigh Whannell (2025)
- Written by: Curt Siodmak (1–2); Edward T. Lowe (3–4); Robert Lees (5); Frederic I. Rinaldo (5); Gertrude Purcell (5); Andrew Kevin Walker (2010); David Self (2010); Leigh Whannell (2025); Corbett Tuck (2025)
- Produced by: George Waggner (1–2); Paul Malvern (3–4); Robert Arthur (5); Scott Stuber (2010); Benicio del Toro (2010); Rick Yorn (2010); Sean Daniel (2010); Jason Blum (2025)
- Starring: Lon Chaney Jr. (1–5); Benicio del Toro (2010); Christopher Abbott (2025)
- Edited by: Ted J. Kent (1); Edward Curtiss (2); Philip Cahn (3); Russell F. Schoengarth (4); Frank Gross (5); Dennis Virkler (2010); Walter Murch (2010); Mark Goldblatt (2010); Andy Canny (2025)
- Music by: Hans J. Salter (1–3); Frank Skinner (1 and 5); Charles Previn (1); Paul Dessau (3); William Lava (4); Danny Elfman (2010); Benjamin Wallfisch (2025)
- Production companies: Universal Pictures (1–5); Relativity Media (2010); Stuber Pictures (2010); Blumhouse Productions (2025); Clock & Co. (2025)
- Distributed by: Universal Pictures
- Country: United States
- Language: English

The Wolf Man is a horror film series centered on Larry Talbot, a man who upon being bitten by a werewolf becomes one himself, and his subsequent attempts to cure himself of his murderous condition. The film series was created by Curt Siodmak.

== Feature films ==
Number	Title	Release date	Director	Continuity
1	The Wolf Man	December 12, 1941	George Waggner	Universal Classic Monsters
2	Frankenstein Meets the Wolf Man	March 5, 1943	Roy William Neill	Universal Classic Monsters
3	House of Frankenstein	December 15, 1944	Erle C. Kenton	Universal Classic Monsters
4	House of Dracula	December 7, 1945	Erle C. Kenton	Universal Classic Monsters
5	Abbott and Costello Meet Frankenstein	June 15, 1948	Charles Barton	Universal Classic Monsters
A	Alvin and the Chipmunks Meet the Wolfman	August 29, 2000	Kathi Castillo	Stand-alone films
6	Van Helsing	May 7, 2004	Stephen Sommers	Stand-alone films
7	The Wolfman	February 12, 2010	Joe Johnston	Remake
8	Wolf Man	January 17, 2025	Leigh Whannell	Reboot

== Universal Monsters film series (1941–1948) ==
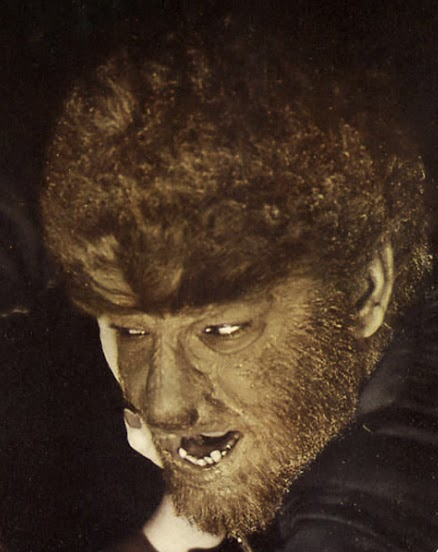
Lon Chaney Jr. as The Wolf Man (1941)

The original series of films consisted of five installments, all of which starred iconic horror actor Lon Chaney Jr. as Larry Talbot. The series of films is part of the larger Universal Classic Monsters series.

Year	Film	The Wolf Man actor
1941	The Wolf Man	Lon Chaney Jr.
1943	Frankenstein Meets the Wolf Man	Lon Chaney Jr.
1944	House of Frankenstein	Lon Chaney Jr.
1945	House of Dracula	Lon Chaney Jr.
1948	Abbott and Costello Meet Frankenstein	Lon Chaney Jr.

- The Wolf Man (1941)
  When his brother dies, Larry Talbot (Lon Chaney Jr.) returns to Wales and reconciles with his father (Claude Rains). While there, he visits an antique shop and, hoping to impress Gwen (Evelyn Ankers), the attractive shopkeeper, buys a silver walking cane. That same night he kills a wolf with it, only to later learn that he actually killed a man (Bela Lugosi). A gypsy (Maria Ouspenskaya) explains that it was her son, a werewolf, that he killed, and that Larry is now one himself.
- Frankenstein Meets the Wolf Man (1943)
  Lawrence Stewart Talbot (Lon Chaney Jr.) is plagued by a physical oddity that turns him into a crazed werewolf after sundown. His desire to rid himself of this ailment leads him to the castle owned by mad scientist Dr. Frankenstein. Frankenstein, it turns out, is now dead, yet Talbot believes that the scientist's daughter, Baroness Elsa Frankenstein (Ilona Massey), can help him. However, his quest to right himself puts him on a collision course with Frankenstein's monster (Bela Lugosi).
- House of Frankenstein (1944)
  After escaping from prison, the evil Dr. Niemann (Boris Karloff) and his hunchbacked assistant, Daniel (J. Carrol Naish), plot their revenge against those who imprisoned them. For this, they recruit the powerful Wolf Man (Lon Chaney Jr.), Frankenstein's monster (Glenn Strange) and even Dracula himself (John Carradine). Niemann pursues those who wrong him, sending each monster out to do his dirty work. But his control on the monsters is weak at best and may prove to be his downfall.
- House of Dracula (1945)
  This monster movie focuses on the iconic vampire, Count Dracula (John Carradine), and Lawrence Talbot (Lon Chaney), better known as the Wolf Man. Both beings of the night are tired of their supernatural afflictions, so they seek out Dr. Franz Edelmann (Onslow Stevens) for cures for their respective curses. While trying to aid the imposing creatures, Edelmann himself develops a transformative condition, adding to the many ghouls lurking around the foreboding landscape.
- Abbott and Costello Meet Frankenstein (1948)
  In the first of Bud Abbott and Lou Costello's horror vehicles for Universal Pictures, the inimitable comic duo star as railway baggage handlers in northern Florida. When a pair of crates belonging to a house of horrors museum are mishandled by Wilbur (Lou Costello), the museum's director, Mr. MacDougal (Frank Ferguson), demands that they deliver them personally so that they can be inspected for insurance purposes, but Lou's friend Chick (Bud Abbott) has grave suspicions, after receiving a phone call from Lawrence Talbot (Lon Chaney Jr.) warning him of their contents (Bela Lugosi and Glenn Strange).

== Remake and reboot (2010–present) ==
In March 2006, Universal Pictures announced the remake of The Wolf Man with Puerto Rican actor Benicio del Toro, a huge fan of the original and collector of Wolf Man memorabilia, in the lead role, who was "cast for his resemblance to Lon Chaney Jr., with his clouded, thick features and his air of suffering". Lawrence is depicted as an "Anglo-Indian, which explains his complexion, and the film notes that he was educated in America, to explain his accent". Screenwriter Andrew Kevin Walker was attached to the screenplay, developing the original film's story to include additional characters as well as plot points that would take advantage of modern visual effects. Del Toro also looked towards Werewolf of London and The Curse of the Werewolf for inspiration.

In February 2007, director Mark Romanek was attached to helm The Wolfman. Romanek's original vision was to "infuse a balance of cinema in a popcorn movie scenario": "When there’s a certain amount of money involved, these things make studios and producers a little nervous. They don’t necessarily understand it or they feel that the balance will swing too far to something esoteric, and we could never come to an agreement on the right balance for that type of thing. Ultimately it made more sense for them to find a director that was gonna fulfill their idea of the film that they wanted, and we just sort of parted ways". In January 2008, Romanek left the project because of creative differences. Brett Ratner emerged as a frontrunner to replace Romanek, but the studio also met with Frank Darabont, James Mangold and Joe Johnston. They were also interested in Bill Condon, and Martin Campbell was interested. Johnston was hired to direct on in February, and the film's shooting schedule and budget remained as intended. Johnston hired David Self to rewrite the script.

Following the financial and critical disappointment of the 2010 remake, Universal Pictures announced its plan to reboot the Universal Classic Monsters in July 2014 as part of a shared universe known as the Dark Universe. In November 2014, Aaron Guzikowski was confirmed to be writing the reboot of Universal's The Wolf Man (1941). In June 2016, Deadline Hollywood reported on rumors that Universal wanted to cast Dwayne Johnson in the title role. By October, development on the film began moving forward, and David Callaham was hired to rewrite the screenplay. In 2017, The Mummy was released as the first film in the Dark Universe; its launch was both a critical and commercial failure, and resulted in Universal deciding to shift its focus on individual storytelling and move away from the shared universe concept with the cancelation of The Wolf Man and other films in development.

Following the success of Leigh Whannell's The Invisible Man in 2020, Universal Pictures "scrap[ped] the universe concept" and loosened restrictions for the talent in front and behind the camera, allowing them to decide how they wanted to execute their films and inviting "big name talent" to pitch their ideas. By early 2020, Universal had been hearing project ideas for a year and a half from a variety of filmmakers seeking to develop other characters in the franchise. This included Ryan Gosling's pitch to remake The Wolf Man, in the vein of Nightcrawler, with Lauren Schuker Blum and Rebecca Angelo writing the screenplay. Several filmmakers were considered to direct, including Cory Finley and Whannell, who initially demurred and was advised by producer Jason Blum to reconsider. In July, Whannell entered negotiations to both write a film treatment and direct. Derek Cianfrance briefly took over directing and writing responsibilities in October 2021, before both Gosling and Cianfrance were reported to have exited the project in December 2023. Whannell returned to direct, along with writing the screenplay alongside Corbett Tuck, Schuker Blum, and Angelo. Christopher Abbott was also announced to be replacing Gosling in the lead role.

- The Wolfman (2010)
  Though absent from his ancestral home of Blackmoor for many years, aristocrat Lawrence Talbot (Benicio Del Toro) returns to find his missing brother at the request of the latter's fiancée, Gwen (Emily Blunt). He learns that a creature has links to an ancient curse turning people into werewolves when the moon is full. To save the village and protect Gwen, he must slay the bloodthirsty beast, but he contends with a horrifying family legacy.
- Wolf Man (2025)
  A man seeks to protect himself and his family from a dangerous werewolf at night during a full moon.

== Cast and characters ==
List indicators
- A dark grey cell indicates the character was not in the film.
- A ^{P} indicates the character was shown in a photograph and/or mentioned.
- A ^{U} indicates an uncredited role.
- A ^{V} indicates a voice-only role.
- A ^{C} indicates a cameo appearance.
- An ^{L} indicates an appearance wherein an actor's facial features were digitally imprinted upon another actor's face.
- A ^{Y} indicates an appearance as a younger version of a pre-existing character.
- An ^{A} indicates an appearance through archival footage, audio or stills.

Character	Universal Classic Monsters					Stand-alone films			Remake	Reboot
Character	The Wolf Man	Frankenstein Meets the Wolf Man	House of Frankenstein	House of Dracula	Abbott and Costello Meet Frankenstein	Alvin and the Chipmunks Meet the Wolfman	Van Helsing	House of the Wolf Man	The Wolfman	Wolf Man
Character	1941	1943	1944	1945	1948	2000	2004	2009	2010	2025
Monsters
Lawrence Stewart Talbot Larry, The Wolf Man Velkan Valerious Blake Lovell	Lon Chaney Jr.	Lon Chaney Jr.	Lon Chaney Jr.	Lon Chaney Jr.	Lon Chaney Jr.	Maurice LaMarche Frank Welker^{V}	Will Kemp	Billy Bussey	Benicio del Toro Mario Marin-Borquez^{Y}	Christopher Abbott Zac Chandler^{Y}
Frankenstein's Monster		Bela Lugosi Eddie Parker & Gil Perkins	Glenn Strange	Glenn Strange	Glenn Strange Lon Chaney Jr.	Mentioned	Shuler Hensley	Craig Dabbs		
Count Vladislaus Dracula			John Carradine	John Carradine	Bela Lugosi	Mentioned	Richard Roxburgh	Michael R. Thomas		
The Hunchback Daniel / Nina / Igor / Barlow			J. Carrol Naish	Jane "Poni" Adams			Kevin J. O'Connor	John McGarr		
Dr. Bela Reinhardt The WereWolf	Bela Lugosi							Ron Chaney	Rick Baker	
Sir John Talbot The Wolf Man	Claude Rains								Anthony Hopkins	
Dr. Franzec "Franz" Edelmann		Don Barclay		Onslow Stevens						
Sir Geoffrey Radcliffe The Invisible Man					Vincent Price^{U}^{V}^{C}					
Theodore Seville The WereWolf						Janice Karman Frank Welker^{V}				
Gabriel Van Helsing							Hugh Jackman			
Verona The First Bride of Dracula							Silvia Colloca			
Aleera The Second Bride of Dracula							Elena Anaya			
Marishka The Third Bride of Dracula							Josie Maran			
Recurring Supporting Characters
Madame Maleva Raya The Gypsy Fortune Teller	Maria Ouspenskaya	Maria Ouspenskaya				April Winchell			Geraldine Chaplin	
Frank Andrews Dr. Mannering Inspector Francis Aberline	Patric Knowles	Patric Knowles							Hugo Weaving	
Dr. Lloyd	Warren William								Michael Cronin	
Colonel Paul Montford	Ralph Bellamy								Nicholas Day	
Gwen Conliffe	Evelyn Ankers								Emily Blunt	
Mayor Inspector Arnz Police Inspector Holtz		Lionel Atwill	Lionel Atwill	Lionel Atwill						
Other Characters
Charles Conliffe	J. M. Kerrigan									
Jenny Williams	Fay Helm									
Twiddle	Forrester Harvey									
Baroness Elsa Frankenstein		Ilona Massey								
Inspector Owen		Dennis Hoey								
Vazec		Rex Evans								
Rudi		Dwight Frye								
Guno		Harry Stubbs								
Dr. Mannering's Nurse		Doris Lloyd								
Dr. Gustav Niemann			Boris Karloff							
Ilonka			Elena Verdugo							
Rita Hussman			Anne Gwynne							
Karl Hussman			Peter Coe							
Bürgermeister Hussman			Sig Ruman							
Bruno Lampini			George Zucco							
Fejos			William Edmunds							
Tobermann			Charles F. Miller							
Müller			Philip Van Zandt							
Hertz			Julius Tannen							
Meier			Hans Herbert							
Born			Dick Dickinson							
Strauss			Michael Mark							
Milizia Morelle				Martha O'Driscoll						
Ziegfried				Ludwig Stössel						
Steinmuhl				Skelton Knaggs						
Villager				Harry Lamont^{U}						
Chick Young					Bud Abbott					
Wilbur Grey					Lou Costello					
Dr. Sandra Mornay					Lenore Aubert					
Joan Raymond					Jane Randolph					
Mr. McDougal					Frank Ferguson					
Professor Stevens					Charles Bradstreet					
Simon Seville						Ross Bagdasarian Jr.				
Alvin Seville						Ross Bagdasarian Jr.				
Principal Milliken						Miriam Flynn				
Mr. Rochelle						Rob Paulsen				
Nathan						Elizabeth Daily				
Anna Valerious							Kate Beckinsale			
Carl							David Wenham			
Cardinal Jinette							Alun Armstrong			
Top Hat The Grave Digger							Tom Fisher			
Dr. Victor Frankenstein							Samuel West			
Reed Chapel								Dustin Fitzsimons		
Conrad Sullivan								Jeremie Loncka		
Mary Chapel								Sara Raftery		
Elmira Cray								Cheryl Rodes		
Archibald Whitlock								Jim Thalman		
Vadoma								Saba Moor-Doucette		
Singh									Art Malik	
Dr. Hoenneger									Antony Sher	
Constable Nye									David Schofield	
Kirk									David Sterne	
Ben Talbot									Simon Merrells Asa Butterfield^{Y}	
Solona Talbot									Cristina Contes	
MacQueen									Clive Russell	
Official Arm Thrower									Dave Tamarro	
Reverend Fisk									Roger Frost	
Elderly Man									Max von Sydow^{C}	
Charlotte Lovell										Julia Garner
Ginger Lovell										Matilda Firth
Grady Lovell The Wolf Man										Sam Jaeger Ben Prendergast
Derek Kiel										Benedict Hardie
Dan Kiel										Leigh Whannell^{V}

== Crew ==
Crew/detail	Universal Classic Monsters					Stand-alone films			Remake	Reboot
Crew/detail	The Wolf Man	Frankenstein Meets the Wolf Man	House of Frankenstein	House of Dracula	Abbott and Costello Meet Frankenstein	Alvin and the Chipmunks Meet the Wolfman	Van Helsing	House of the Wolf Man	The Wolfman	Wolf Man
Crew/detail	1941	1943	1944	1945	1948	2000	2004	2009	2010	2025
Director(s)	George Waggner	Roy William Neill	Erle C. Kenton	Erle C. Kenton	Charles Barton	Kathi Castillo	Stephen Sommers	Eben McGarr	Joe Johnston	Leigh Whannell
Producer(s)	George Waggner	George Waggner	Paul Malvern	Paul Malvern	Robert Arthur	Kathi Castillo	Stephen Sommers Bob Ducsay	Eden and John P. McGarr Roland R. Rosenberg Jr. David & Larry Sontag	Scott Stuber Benicio del Toro Rick Yorn & Sean Daniel	Jason Blum
Writer(s)	Curt Siodmak	Curt Siodmak	Edward T. Lowe	Edward T. Lowe	Robert Lees, Frederic I. Rinaldo & Gertrude Purcell	John Loy	Stephen Sommers	Eben McGarr	Andrew Kevin Walker and David Self	Leigh Whannell, Corbett Tuck, Lauren Schuker Blum, and Rebecca Angelo
Composer(s)	Charles Previn, Hans J. Salter and Frank Skinner (uncredited)	Hans J. Salter	Hans J. Salter and Paul Dessau	William Lava	Frank Skinner	Mark Watters	Alan Silvestri	Nate Scott	Danny Elfman	Benjamin Wallfisch
Editor(s)	Ted J. Kent	Edward Curtiss	Philip Cahn	Russell F. Schoengarth	Frank Gross	Jay Bisxen	Bob Ducsay & Kelly Matsumoto	Cyrus Navarro	Dennis Virkler, Walter Murch and Mark Goldblatt	Andy Canny
Cinematographer	Joseph Valentine, ASC	George Robinson	George Robinson	George Robinson	Charles Van Enger	—N/a	Allen Daviau	Royce A. Dudley	Shelly Johnson	Stefan Duscio
Production companies	Universal Pictures	Universal Pictures	Universal Pictures	Universal Pictures	Universal Pictures	Bagdasarian Productions; Universal Cartoon Studios; Tama Productions	Sommers Company; Stillking Films	My Way Pictures	Relativity Media; Stuber Pictures	Blumhouse Productions; Cloak & Co.
Distributor(s)	Universal Pictures	Universal Pictures	Universal Pictures	Universal Pictures	Universal Pictures	Universal Studios Home Video	Universal Pictures	Taurus Entertainment Company	Universal Pictures	Universal Pictures
Runtime	70 minutes	75 minutes	71 minutes	67 minutes	83 minutes	77 minutes	131 minutes	75 minutes	103 minutes	103 minutes
Release date	December 12, 1941	March 5, 1943	December 15, 1944	December 7, 1945	June 15, 1948	August 29, 2000	May 7, 2004	October 1, 2009	February 12, 2010	January 17, 2025

== Reception ==
Film	Rotten Tomatoes	Metacritic
The Wolf Man	91% (45 reviews)	72 (9 reviews)
Frankenstein Meets the Wolf Man	25% (12 reviews)	—N/a
House of Frankenstein	55% (11 reviews)	—N/a
House of Dracula	56% (9 reviews)	—N/a
Abbott and Costello Meet Frankenstein	90% (29 reviews)	—N/a
Van Helsing	24% (225 reviews)	35 (38 reviews)
The Wolfman	32% (220 reviews)	43 (36 reviews)

== Sequel novel series ==
- In Jeff Rovin's 1998 novel Return of the Wolf Man it is revealed Talbot and Dracula had survived the fall they took at the end of Abbott and Costello Meet Frankenstein. Talbot subsequently kills Charles Stevens and, upon reverting to human form, has Joan Raymond kill him and perform a specific burial so Talbot could never be revived. Nonetheless, Talbot is inadvertently revived and befriends Raymond's niece Caroline Cooke. Talbot turns his attention from being killed once and for all to stopping the also returning Dracula and Frankenstein's monster. In the end, Talbot, in his werewolf form, kills Dracula only to be beaten to death by Caroline with a silver candelabrum.

== See also ==
- Universal Classic Monsters
  - Dracula (Universal film series)
  - Frankenstein (Universal film series)
  - The Invisible Man (film series)
  - The Mummy (franchise)
