= Patrick O'Bryan =

American actor

- Born: February 17, 1962 (age 64)
- Other names: Pat O'Bryan, Patrick Aloysius O'Bryan

Patrick O'Bryan (born February 17, 1962) is an American actor known for his appearances in a variety of television shows and films in the late 1980s and early 1990s. He is perhaps best known for his starring role as "Spike" in the 1988 cult film 976-EVIL, which also marked the directorial debut of A Nightmare on Elm Street star Robert Englund.

== Career ==
Patrick O'Bryan's first television role came in 1986, where he portrayed Phillip in the television series Heart of the City. O'Bryan continued television acting throughout the next few years making appearances on television shows such as "You are the Jury" and the popular "Highway to Heaven," among others. In 1988, O'Bryan received his first starring role alongside Stephen Geoffreys in the film 976-EVIL, directed by Robert Englund, who is most well known for his role as Freddy Krueger. Despite being panned by critics, the film has maintained a cult following amongst enthusiasts.

O'Bryan would continue to appear in both television and film before returning to reprise his role in the sequel to 976-EVIL, which would be his last known film.

== Works ==
=== Film ===
Year	Title	Role	Notes
1988	976-EVIL	Spike	Credited as Pat O'Bryan
1989	No Holds Barred	Craig	Credited as Pat O'Bryan
1989	Relentless	Todd Arthur	Credited as Patrick O'Bryan
1990	Pastime	Walsh	Credited as Pat O'Bryan
1991	Blood and Concrete	Barton	Credited as Pat O'Bryan
1991	976-Evil II	Spike	Credited as Patrick O'Bryan

=== Television ===
Year	Title	Role	Notes
1986	Heart of the City	Phillip	Episode: "Cezanne, and Other Dreams" Episode: "Growing Up and Grinding Down"
1986	You are the Jury	Jimmy Wolsky	Episode: "The State of Ohio vs. James Wolsky"
1987	The New Gidget	Jason	Episode: "Dead Man's Curl" (Credited as Patrick Aloysius O'Bryan)
1987	Highway to Heaven	Gary Davis	Episode: "Heavy Date" (Credited as Patrick Aloysius O'Bryan)
1987	The Bronx Zoo	Johnny Reese	Episode: "The Power of a Lie" Episode: "Runaway Hearts"
1987	Head of the Class	The Kid	Episode: "Child of the 60s"
1988	Tour of Duty	'Long John' Vivian	Episode: "USO Down"
1988	"I Saw What You Did"	Louis	Television Movie
1989	China Beach	Connor McMurphy	Episode: "The World: Part 1" Episode: "The World: Part 2"
