= Secret Admirer (film) =

1985 film by David Greenwalt

- Theatrical release poster
- Directed by: David Greenwalt
- Written by: David Greenwalt; Jim Kouf
- Produced by: Steve Roth
- Starring: C. Thomas Howell; Lori Loughlin; Kelly Preston; Fred Ward; Dee Wallace Stone; Leigh Taylor-Young; Cliff DeYoung
- Cinematography: Victor J. Kemper
- Edited by: Dennis Virkler
- Music by: Jan Hammer
- Distributed by: Orion Pictures
- Release date: June 14, 1985
- Running time: 100 minutes
- Country: United States
- Language: English
- Budget: $7 million
- Box office: $8.6 million (US)

Secret Admirer is a 1985 American teen romantic comedy film co-written and directed by David Greenwalt in his feature film directorial debut, and starring C. Thomas Howell, Lori Loughlin, Kelly Preston, and Fred Ward. The original music score was composed by Jan Hammer. The film was produced at the height of the teen sex comedy cinema craze in the mid-1980s.

== Plot ==
Michael Ryan is a high school Junior who receives an anonymous love letter on his last day of the school year. He is obsessed with Deborah Ann ("Debbie") Fimple, the class beauty, and his best friend, Roger, suggests that the letter is from her. However, he is totally oblivious that his friend Toni Williams is in love with him.

Michael writes Deborah Ann an anonymous love letter in return, and asks Toni to give it to her. She reads it and, realizing it's poorly written and unromantic (since Michael had copied words from greeting cards), she rewrites it.

Elizabeth Fimple, Deborah Ann's mother, discovers the letter. Her jealous police officer husband, Lou Fimple, sees her reading it. He steals the letter, and believes that his wife is having an affair. He suspects his neighbor (and bridge partner) George Ryan. George also reads the letter (although by mistake) because Lou's wife is his night school teacher and it ends up in his book by his younger son, Jeff. When George asks her about it, he assumes she wants to have an affair with him, despite the fact that she is friends with his wife. Meanwhile, Lou shows the letter to George's wife, Connie, and proposes that they expose the adulterers.

Having not received a response from Deborah Ann, and learning that she loved the first one, Michael writes a second letter, which Toni again rewrites. He then experiences a series of wacky adventures with his friends throughout the summer before his Senior year in High School. Toni arranges a meeting between Michael and Debbie, where he confesses to Debbie that he wrote the love letters. Enamored, she finally agrees to a real date, during which they are almost caught by Debbie's jock college "quasi boyfriend," Steve. However, Toni intervenes by pretending to seduce him and later ditches him.

After a short while, Michael realizes Debbie is snobby and shallow — not like he expected her to be — and begins to realize his true feelings for Toni. Eventually, Michael and Deb break up at his birthday party when he is not able to sleep with her after she intends for it to be his birthday present. Meanwhile, Lou and Connie cannot control themselves at a bridge party: Lou assaults George, and Connie has a breakdown in front of their friends.

When Michael returns home, he finds his parents arguing about his anonymous love letter. He angrily tells them it actually belongs to him while scolding them for invading his private mail, leaving them in shock. At Debbie's, Lou confronts Elizabeth about the letter. Debbie overhears him reading the letter out loud and tearfully reprimands him, revealing the letter is hers, which leaves Lou in shock. Angered that her parents invaded her privacy, she heads to her room and breaks down into tears. Michael returns to Toni's, confessing that nothing happened between him and Deborah and in the process declares his feelings for Toni, wondering if anything can ever happen between them. However, refusing to admit her feelings after everything that happened, she rejects Michael.

Just as the fall semester is about to start, Debbie confronts Michael about the love letters, but upon seeing them, Michael learns they aren't the letters he wrote and realizes that Toni wrote the original love letter (by comparing Debbie's letter to Toni's handwriting). He races to her home, but is told that she already left on a study abroad program aboard a ship that will keep her away for their Senior Year. Michael rushes to the dockyard after a brief scuffle with Steve and takes his convertible, and then professes his love for Toni when he sees her boat setting sail. He dives into the water, but cannot reach the ship. Toni shouts her love and dives into the water after him, where they embrace and share a kiss.

== Cast ==
- C. Thomas Howell as Michael Ryan
- Kelly Preston as Deborah Ann Fimple
- Lori Loughlin as Toni Williams
- Fred Ward as Lieutenant Lou Fimple
- Dee Wallace Stone as Connie Ryan
- Cliff DeYoung as George Ryan
- Leigh Taylor-Young as Elizabeth Fimple
- Casey Siemaszko as Roger Despard
- Geoffrey Blake as Ricardo
- Scott McGinnis as Steve Powers
- Corey Haim as Jeff Ryan
- Courtney Gains as Doug
- J.J. Cohen as Barry
- Janet Carroll as Toni's Mother

== Reception ==
Rotten Tomatoes, a review aggregator, reports that 33% of 12 surveyed critics gave the film a positive review; the average rating was 5.2/10. In a negative review, Janet Maslin of The New York Times wrote that the initial concept might have sounded good. Maslin called Fred Ward the film's "sole ray of sunshine". Time Out London compared it negatively to French sex farces and said that it offers no insights. TV Guide rated it 1/5 stars and wrote, "This cross between theatrical farce and teen sex comedy is a moronic package that liberally insults the intelligence of both its viewing audience and the hapless adult actors locked into career low points." Reviewing the film retrospectively, Sarah D. Bunting of Slant Magazine called it "relatively good", which she defines as "not unwatchable" in terms of teen films.

In 1985, the Los Angeles Times asked a group of teens to judge their interest in a series of released films. After seeing preview and press materials, the teens rated Secret Admirer "C" on an "A to F" range; their opinion was divided over whether they wanted to see it or not.

== Vasos de papel plagiarism controversy ==
In 2016, the Puerto Rican film Vasos de papel (literal translation: Paper Cups) was object of criticism, and mockery, after it was discovered that the film, produced and directed by Eduardo "Transfor" Ortiz, was an unauthorized, almost-exact copy of Secret Admirer. The film had been playing on 25 screens at local cinemas for less than a week when Puerto Rican film critic Orlando Maldonado wrote an article comparing four sequences from each of the films, and pointing out how they were carbon copies of each other.

Once the film was no longer in cinemas across Puerto Rico, Ortiz, who had previously attributed the writing of the film's screenplay only to himself, first said that there were only "certain similarities between one film and the other, not plagiarism. Everything is a matter of interpretation". A few hours after making that statement, Ortiz changed it, saying in a radio interview that he "had done something terribly wrong", apologizing to his cast and crew. Ortiz refused to comment on the issue until singer-songwriter and the film's lead actress, Natalia Lugo, released a statement on her Facebook page where she both condemned the film, which was her acting debut, and expressed the embarrassment she felt when she saw Secret Admirer, and came to understand how she and her fellow actors and crew had been duped.
