= 976-Evil II =

976-EVIL II
- VHS cover
- Directed by: Jim Wynorski
- Written by: Erik Anjou; Rick Glassman
- Produced by: Lisa M. Hansen (executive producer); Paul Hertzberg (producer); Catalaine Knell (associate producer)
- Starring: Patrick O'Bryan; Debbie James; René Assa
- Cinematography: Zoran Hochstätter
- Edited by: Nina Gilberti
- Music by: Chuck Cirino
- Distributed by: CineTel Films
- Release dates: October 1991 (Italy); April 22, 1992 (United States)
- Running time: 93 minutes
- Country: United States
- Language: English

976-EVIL II (also known as 976-EVIL 2: The Astral Factor) is a 1991 American supernatural horror film directed by Jim Wynorski. The film is a sequel to the 1988 horror film 976-EVIL. It was referenced in Invasion of the Scream Queens (1992). 976-Evil II premiered at the MIFED (Mercato internazionale del film e del documentario) festival in Italy in October 1991 and was subsequently released on VHS in the United States on April 22, 1992.

== Plot ==
Leonard "Spike" Johnson returns to battle the supernatural in a small Californian college town. Someone is killing college students at an alarming rate. A pretty student, Robin, learns that her dean, Professor Grubeck, is a ghost, using astral projection and a satanic 976 "horrorscope" hotline to kill students.

== Cast ==
- Debbie James as Robin
- René Assa as Mr. Grubeck
- Patrick O'Bryan as Leonard "Spike" Johnson
- Philip McKeon as Taylor
- Leslie Ryan as Paula
- Brigitte Nielsen as Agnes
- Rod McCary as Dr. Jamison
- Paul Coufos as Stone
- Karen Mayo-Chandler as Laurie
- George Buck Flower as Turrell
- Sigal Diamant as Barmaid
- Joy Ballard as Stripper
- Yavone Evans as Reporter
- Eric Anjou as Detective
- Angela Gordon as Cashier
- Christopher Garr as "Skeech"
- David Rogge as Keith
- Lou Bonacki as Neelan
- Chuck Montalbano as Gross
- Ace Mask as Lemisch
- Monique Gabrielle as Lawlor
- Deborah Dutch as Commercial Wife
- Ronald Green as Commercial Husband
- Mindy Seeger as Nurse

== Production ==
The film was directed by Jim Wynorski, who had gained a reputation for making numerous sequels, such as Deathstalker 2. "People would just come to me and ask," said Wynorski. "And I always said 'yes'. I wanted the money and the experience. There were only a couple of films that I turned down. I always wanted to make a sequel only if the previous film was bad. There wasn't much point to a sequel if the previous release was really great. I wanted to make a sequel that was better than the first one."

Wynorski later said, "I hate that film... It was tough to make. I was handed a script, and I didn't think it was very good." The only part of the film he liked was a sequence in which a female student was meant to be sucked into a Pac-Man machine. This was too expensive to film, so Wynorski came up with the idea, based on a dream, to recreate a scene from It's a Wonderful Life (1946). He could do this because that film was in the public domain. "For me, that's the one standout aspect of that film, 'cause it's so weird," he said.

The film featured Brigitte Nielsen in a small role. Wynorski met her at a party, and they played pool together. Wynorski challenged her to a wager - if he won, she would do a day for him for scale on his next picture; if she won, he would "put on a maid's outfit and clean your house. And she was up for that. We had a good game; it was close, but I won." So Nielsen did a day on the film. Wynorski said she did "an ok job... she wasn't difficult to work with. She was working for pretty big bucks at the time, and she was working for scale, and she didn't really come in super prepared, and we had to go over her lines, but in the end she did a great job."

== Home media ==
The movie was released in April 1992 on videocassette by Vestron Video. A DVD was released in the UK. In the U.S., the film was released on DVD by Lionsgate as part of an 8 horror film DVD set.
