= Next Stop Wonderland =

- Theatrical release poster
- Directed by: Brad Anderson
- Written by: Brad Anderson; Lyn Vaus
- Produced by: Mitchell Robbins; Laura Bernieri; Rachael Horovitz
- Starring: Hope Davis; Alan Gelfant; Victor Argo; Jon Benjamin; Cara Buono; Larry Gilliard, Jr.; Philip Seymour Hoffman; Jason Lewis; Roger Rees; Sam Seder; Robert Stanton; Holland Taylor; Callie Thorne; Jimmy Tingle; Lyn Vaus; José Zúñiga; Robert Klein
- Cinematography: Uta Briesewitz
- Edited by: Brad Anderson
- Music by: Claudio Ragazzi
- Production company: Robbins Entertainment
- Distributed by: Miramax Films
- Release dates: January 17, 1998 (Sundance); August 21, 1998 (United States)
- Running time: 104 minutes
- Country: United States
- Language: English
- Budget: $1 million
- Box office: $3.4 million

Next Stop Wonderland is a 1998 American romantic comedy film directed by Brad Anderson, written by Anderson and Lyn Vaus, and starring Hope Davis and Alan Gelfant. It premiered at the Sundance Film Festival on January 17, 1998, where it was nominated for a Grand Jury Prize.

== Plot ==
Two people live unlucky in love in Boston: Erin, whose activist boyfriend Sean has just walked out on their relationship to help a Native American tribe fight off a land development deal, and Alan, a plumber struggling to pay off family obligations while pursuing a career as a marine biologist. Both deal with personal and professional problems and stumble through relationships, continually crossing one another's paths without ever truly meeting and realizing how perfect they are for one another. Time and time again one almost catches the other's eye, but circumstances intervene. After a series of ups and downs both of their budding relationships with others crash and burn, just in time for a chance meeting on the MBTA train (the Blue Line) heading to Wonderland station in Revere, Massachusetts, on the outskirts of Boston.

== Cast ==
- Hope Davis as Erin Castleton
- Alan Gelfant as Alan Monteiro
- Philip Seymour Hoffman as Sean
- Cara Buono as Julie
- José Zúñiga as Andre de Silva
- Sam Seder as Kevin Monteiro
- Callie Thorne as Cricket
- Jimmy Tingle as bartender
- Holland Taylor as Piper Castleton
- Robert Klein as Arty Lesser
- H. Jon Benjamin as Eric
- Frank L. Ridley as whale watch captain (voice)
- Lawrence Gilliard Jr. as Brett

== Release ==
The film, which cost $1 million to make, was an audience favorite at the Sundance Film Festival in 1998. A bidding war among studio distributors resulted in Miramax Films paying $6 million for the film's North American distribution rights. The film grossed $3.3 million during its theatrical release.

=== Home media ===
The film was released on VHS in 1999, and also received a 2001 US DVD release from Buena Vista Home Entertainment, a home video arm of Miramax owner The Walt Disney Company. It also received a Region 2 DVD release in the UK.

In 2010, Miramax was sold by The Walt Disney Company (their owners since 1993), with the studio being taken over by private equity firm Filmyard Holdings that same year. Filmyard sublicensed the home video rights for several Miramax titles to Echo Bridge Entertainment, who re-released Next Stop Wonderland on DVD in 2012, with new artwork. Miramax was then taken over by Qatari company beIN Media Group during March 2016. In April 2020, ViacomCBS (now known as Paramount Skydance) acquired the rights to Miramax's library, after buying a 49% stake in the studio from beIN. Next Stop Wonderland was one of the 700 titles Paramount acquired in the 2020 deal. The film was later made available on Paramount's free streaming service Pluto TV.

== Soundtrack ==
The film's soundtrack is scored by Claudio Ragazzi with various renditions by Vinicius Cantuaria, Arto Lindsay, and Bebel Gilberto. It was released on Verve Records.

== Reception ==
On the review aggregator website Rotten Tomatoes, 73% of 44 critics' reviews are positive. The website's consensus reads: "Endearing performances create characters you care about." Metacritic, which uses a weighted average, assigned the film a score of 71 out of 100, based on 19 critics, indicating "generally favorable" reviews.

Rita Kempley of The Washington Post wrote: "It's the individual characters, so carefully crafted, who count, as opposed to a tidy conclusion". Variety's Todd McCarthy wrote that Next Stop Wonderland is "Low on plot but high on charm and personality", adding that "[it']s a sly, hand-crafted indie that is very alive and attentive to its characters' feelings and foibles". Stephen Holden of The New York Times said that "Next Stop Wonderland isn't really much more than a beautifully acted, finely edited sitcom, but it creates and sustains an intelligent, seriocomic mood better than any recent film about the urban single life".
