= Do Not Disturb (2010 film) =

- DVD cover
- Directed by: BC Furtney
- Written by: BC Furtney
- Produced by: Jason Winn 'J.B. Destiny' Bareford
- Starring: Stephen Geoffreys, Ezra Buzzington, Anthony Colliano, Robert DiDonato, Corey Haim
- Cinematography: Nickolas Dylan Rossi
- Edited by: Ernesto Galan
- Music by: Trevin Pinto
- Production company: Ruthless Pictures
- Distributed by: Image Entertainment
- Release dates: March 23, 2010 (New Terminal Hotel); August 6, 2013 (Do Not Disturb)
- Running time: 98 minutes (New Terminal Hotel), 85 minutes (Do Not Disturb)
- Country: United States
- Language: English

Do Not Disturb (originally New Terminal Hotel) is an American horror thriller film written and directed by BC Furtney. The film was originally released on March 23, 2010 as New Terminal Hotel but was edited for an August 6, 2013 DVD release through Image Entertainment as Do Not Disturb. The movie stars Stephen Geoffreys as a man out to get revenge for the death of his girlfriend. The film is also known for being one of the last film performances of actor Corey Haim before his death in 2010.

== Plot ==
When his girlfriend gets murdered, Don Malek sets out to seek revenge from the people that brought about her death.

== Cast ==
- Stephen Geoffreys as Donald Malek
- Ezra Buzzington as Spitz
- Anthony Colliano as Stanley Glissberg
- Robert DiDonato as Detective Dom Turkovich
- James Grabowski as Carter Ball
- Corey Haim as Jasper Crash
- Tiffany Shepis as Ava Collins
- Laura Hofrichter as Katherin (as Laura Leigh)
- Sam Nicotero as DiAngelo
- Tara Sukustis as Rebecca
- Jeremy Moon as Waiter
- Danielle Fortwangler as Hooker

== Production ==
Furtney originally began working on the movie under the title New Terminal Hotel. The movie was filmed in Washington, Pennsylvania in the George Washington Hotel. The movie's filming received some media attention as Furtney's hotel room set at the George Washington Hotel was mistaken for the scene of a crime. New Terminal Hotel received a soft release in 2010, but did not receive much reception.

Film rights for the movie were later picked up by Image Entertainment and distributed under the name Do Not Disturb. Furtney removed "about 15 minutes" of footage from the film, which he felt strengthened the movie.

== Reception ==
Critical reception for Do Not Disturb was mixed to negative. HorrorNews.net gave a mixed review, stating that it was "an odd little movie but despite its oddness and its laid back atmosphere it’s an effective movie." Ain't It Cool News gave a more positive review, remarking that while "story itself meanders a bit, and I must admit I was bored by the time the last act comes around" that "some decent and quizzical performances make it one of those films that should be seen if only for its odd nature". Shock Till You Drop heavily criticized the film, saying that "Watching it made me feel like an unwilling participant in someone else’s extremely depressing crack-induced nightmare".
