= 976-EVIL =

1988 film by Robert Englund

- Theatrical release poster
- Directed by: Robert Englund
- Written by: Rhet Topham; Brian Helgeland
- Produced by: Lisa M. Hansen; Paul Hertzberg
- Starring: Stephen Geoffreys; Jim Metzler; Maria Rubell; Patrick O'Bryan; Sandy Dennis
- Cinematography: Paul Elliott
- Edited by: Stephen R. Myers
- Music by: Thomas Chase; Steve Rucker
- Production companies: CineTel Films; Horrorscope Productions
- Distributed by: New Line Cinema
- Release dates: December 9, 1988 (UK); March 24, 1989 (US)
- Running time: 92 minutes (theatrical cut) 105 minutes (extended cut)
- Country: United States
- Language: English
- Budget: $2 million
- Box office: $3 million (US)

976-EVIL is a 1988 American supernatural horror film directed by actor Robert Englund in his directorial debut, and co-written by Brian Helgeland. It stars Stephen Geoffreys, Patrick O'Bryan, Jim Metzler, Maria Rubell, and Sandy Dennis. The film's title refers to the 976 telephone exchange, a now mostly defunct premium-rate telephone number system that was popular in the late 1980s but has since been superseded by area code 900.

A sequel, 976-EVIL 2: The Astral Factor, was followed released in 1991 in Italy and 1992 in the United States.

== Plot ==
Cousins Leonard "Spike" Johnson and Hoax Arthur Wilmoth are teenagers who live with Hoax's overtly religious and domineering mother, Lucy Wilmoth. While Spike is the neighborhood motorcycle bad boy, Hoax is an introverted nerd. Even though Spike genuinely cares for his cousin and protects him from bullies, Hoax is filled with resentment that he cannot stand up for himself or succeed romantically (both of which Spike does effortlessly).

Both boys stumble upon 976-EVIL, which, on the surface, is just a novelty phone line that offers creepy-themed fortunes for a few dollars. However, the line is actually used by Satan to subtly corrupt mortals into his bidding. Spike loses interest in the line quickly, but Hoax soon discovers the true nature of the line and uses it to get revenge on everyone who has wronged him.

Soon, Hoax's spirit is almost entirely consumed by Satan, who possesses Hoax to cause death and destruction, culminating in an opening to Hell appearing before their house. Spike confronts Hoax, but is quickly overpowered. In a desperate last ploy, he calls earnestly to his cousin, reminding him of the plans they had to take a vacation that summer.

Hoax's fleeting soul briefly resurfaces, realizes his horrible mistake, and embraces Spike, begging for help. Spike, realizing Hoax is lost and cannot be separated from the demonic presence, reluctantly throws him into the pit of Hell.

== Cast ==
- Stephen Geoffreys as Hoax Arthur Wilmoth
- Patrick O'Bryan as Leonard "Spike" Johnson
- Lezlie Deane as Suzie
- Jim Metzler as Marty Palmer
- Maria Rubell as Angela Martinez
- Sandy Dennis as Aunt Lucy Wilmoth
- J.J. Cohen as Marcus
- Darren E. Burrows as Jeff
- Gunther Jenson as "Airhead"
- Jim Thiebaud as "Rags"
- Wendy J. Cooke as Gang Girl
- Robert Picardo as Mark Dark
- J.J. Johnston as Virgil
- Paul Willson as Mr. Michaels
- Greg Collins as Mr. Selby
- Demetre Phillips as Sergeant Bell
- Don Bajema as Deputy
- Roxanne Rogers as Angel, The Waitress
- Joanna Keyes as Suzie's Mother
- Tom McFadden as Minister
- Bert Hinchman as The Coroner
- Cynthia Szigeti as Female Operator
- John Currie Slade as John Doe
- Mindy Seeger as Female Victim
- Quigley The Parrot as Aunt Lucy's Parrot

== Production ==
Following his success playing Freddy Krueger in the A Nightmare on Elm Street series, Robert Englund was able to use his established clout to land a directing job. While Englund had hoped to direct something more in line with a character study than a horror film, he so liked the script by longtime friend Rhet Topham that he accepted the job.

== Release ==
The film was released theatrically in the United States by New Line Cinema in March 1989. It grossed $2,955,917 at the box office.

The film was released on home video by RCA/Columbia Pictures Home Video the same year. VHS, and LaserDisc versions of the film are uncut and contain footage previously unseen in its original theatrical release.

The film was released on DVD by Sony Pictures Home Entertainment in 2002. The DVD version as well as the Crackle version are the theatrical cut. Both versions were released on Blu-ray on October 3, 2017. It was released on UK Blu-ray by Eureka Entertainment on October 19, 2020.

== Reception ==
976-EVIL received a negative critical reception and currently has an approval rating of 15% on review aggregator website Rotten Tomatoes, based on 13 reviews. The Washington Post wrote "From start to finish, 976-EVIL is a sorry, wrong number." AllMovie however defended the film, calling it "underrated". John Fallon of JoBlo.com gave the film 6/10 stars and remarked that it "could've been great stuff", but "loses its touch in its second half, relying on unsatisfying murders and "ho-hum" effects to pad it up though."

== Sequel ==
A direct-to-video sequel entitled 976-EVIL II: The Astral Factor was released in 1992, with Patrick O'Bryan reprising his role as Spike.
