= The Third Girl from the Left =

1973 television film by Peter Medak

- Genre: Drama
- Written by: Dory Previn
- Directed by: Peter Medak
- Starring: Kim Novak; Tony Curtis
- Music by: Dory Previn
- Country of origin: United States
- Original language: English

Production
- Executive producer: Hugh M. Hefner
- Producer: Ron Roth
- Cinematography: Gayne Rescher
- Editor: Jim Benson
- Running time: 73 minutes
- Production company: Playboy Productions

Original release
- Network: ABC
- Release: October 16, 1973

The Third Girl From the Left is a 1973 American made-for-television drama film directed by Peter Medak, written by Dory Previn, and starring Kim Novak and Tony Curtis. The film was originally shown on October 16, 1973 on the anthology series ABC Movie of the Week.

It was the television film debut for both Novak and Curtis. Also in the cast are Michael Conrad, George Furth and Barbi Benton. Hugh Hefner was the Executive Producer for the film, which was made by Playboy Films.

== Plot ==
Gloria Joyce is a chorus girl who has an affair with a delivery boy, David, when she realizes that her long-time affair with a nightclub comedian, Joey Jordan, is not going anywhere.

== Cast ==
- Kim Novak as Gloria Joyce
- Tony Curtis as Joey Jordan
- Michael Brandon as David
- George Furth as Zimmy
- Michael Conrad as Hugh
- Bern Hoffman as Len Winters
- Jenifer Shaw as Gaye
- Louis Guss as Murray
- Barbi Benton as Melanie
- Anne Ramsey as Madelaine
- Larry Bishop as Bradford
- René Assa as Larry

== Reception ==
=== Critical response ===
According to the film's IMDb entry, it has a critic rating of 6.3/10.
