= No Holds Barred (1989 film) =

1989 film by Thomas J. Wright

- Theatrical release poster
- Directed by: Thomas J. Wright
- Written by: Dennis Hackin
- Produced by: Michael Rachmil
- Starring: Hulk Hogan; Kurt Fuller; Joan Severance; Tiny Lister
- Cinematography: Frank Beascoechea
- Edited by: Tom Pryor
- Music by: Jim Johnston
- Production company: Shane Distribution Company
- Distributed by: New Line Cinema
- Release date: June 2, 1989 (USA)
- Running time: 93 minutes
- Country: United States
- Language: English
- Budget: $8 million (estimated)
- Box office: $16 million (USA)

No Holds Barred is a 1989 American action film produced by Michael Rachmil, directed by Thomas J. Wright, written by Dennis Hackin and starring professional wrestler Hulk Hogan (who is billed as executive producer alongside Vince McMahon). It is owned by the World Wrestling Federation (WWF, renamed WWE in 2002) under a "Shane Distribution Company" copyright and was released by New Line Cinema on June 2, 1989. Released seven years after his appearance in Rocky III, it was Hogan's first starring role.

== Plot ==
Rip Thomas is the WWF Heavyweight Champion, and his appearances on network TV have been a thorn in the side of Mr. Tom Brell, the head of the struggling World Television Network. Rip is a huge ratings draw, while WTN is the lowest-rated TV network. The day after Rip's most recent title match against Jake Bullet, Brell attempts to entice Rip into joining his network, but he refuses. Angry at being stood up by a man he considers a "jock ass", Brell tries to exact revenge by hiring his goons to jump Rip in his limo, but Rip successfully fights them off.

Later, Brell visits the No Count Bar, where he comes up with his own wrestling program called The Battle Of The Tough Guys. The show is successful due to the introduction of Zeus, an ex-convict and former protege of Rip's trainer, Charlie. Zeus wins the $100,000 tournament and becomes Brell's prized fighter.

Samantha Moore, a corporate spy, is sent by Brell to seduce Rip. However, Rip's good nature and dedication to charity win her over, and she confesses her identity to the wrestler and turns to his side. Brell learns of Samantha's defection and, vowing revenge, sends his underlings to kidnap and rape her. Rip thwarts their efforts, throwing one of the stooges into a tree trunk.

Later, Rip is at a charity event when Brell and Zeus arrive, demanding that Rip prove his honor by fighting Zeus on The Battle Of The Tough Guys. Rip declines, wanting to set a good example for the children around him. Meanwhile, Rip's younger brother Randy and his friend, Craig, decide to check out Zeus for themselves, attending a fight being held in a warehouse. After watching Zeus defeat the monstrous Rebar Lawless, Craig identifies Randy as Rip's brother to Brell and his associates. Randy attempts to defend himself, but Zeus brutally beats him, sending him to the hospital. Enraged, Rip accepts Zeus' challenge to avenge his brother. While Zeus spends all his time training, Rip spends his time leading up to the match, helping the almost-paralyzed Randy learn to walk again.

On the night of the match, Brell kidnaps Samantha and orders Rip to spend 10 minutes with Zeus before losing the fight to save her life. As the battle begins, Samantha escapes, but just as Brell's goons corner her, Charlie and Craig rescue her and defeat them. Back in the arena, Zeus gains the upper hand and ruthlessly pummels Rip, even attempting to impale him through the chest with one of the steel ring posts. Randy urges his brother to fight back. Rip is re-energized by Randy's words, and once he sees Samantha is safe, he gains a second wind and starts to turn the tide on Zeus. The fight destroys the ring, with Rip and Zeus continuing the battle up through the stands as Brell watches from the control room.

Rip finally puts an end to the match by knocking Zeus off a catwalk and through the ring far below. A frustrated Brell begins destroying electrical equipment, enraged over Zeus' loss. Rip angrily goes after Brell, intent on repaying him for his misdeeds. Brell retreats, but accidentally touches live wires he had exposed in his tantrum and is electrocuted and dies. With their enemies vanquished, Rip and Randy celebrate with their friends.

== Cast ==
- Hulk Hogan as Rip Thomas
- Joan Severance as Samantha Moore
- Kurt Fuller as Tom Brell
- Tiny Lister as Zeus
- Mark Pellegrino as Randy Thomas
- Bill Henderson as Charlie
- Charles Levin as Ordway
- David Paymer as Unger
- Patrick O'Bryan as Craig
- Jeep Swenson as "Lugwrench" Perkins
- Bill Eadie as Jake Bullet
- Stan Hansen as Neanderthal
- Rebecca Wackler as Ms. Tidings
- Bruce Taylor as Mr. Johnson
- Gene Okerlund as himself
- Jesse Ventura as himself
- Howard Finkel as himself
- Joey Marella as himself
- Rick Allen as Unnamed Wrestler
- Marcus Bagwell as uncredited extra

== Release ==
=== Home media ===
The film was released on VHS, Betamax, and LaserDisc the next year. It was released on DVD with a digitally remastered transfer by WWE Home Video under the WWE Studios banner on July 3, 2012. A Blu-ray Disc release followed in April 2014.

== Reception and legacy ==
=== Box office ===
The movie debuted at #2, behind Indiana Jones and the Last Crusade, with $4,957,052 in ticket sales. Hogan writes in his autobiography the budget was about eight million dollars. Vince McMahon, who financed the movie, more or less broke even because of distribution fees. The final tally was $16,093,651 in ticket sales.

During the October 13, 1997 episode of Monday Night Raw, Vince McMahon joked, "Hogan promised me that if the movie lost money he was gonna return his salary. I guess the check is still in the mail." This was during the Monday Night War and was part of a number of digs at Hogan's then-new movie project Assault on Devil's Island. Raw commentator Jim Ross also joked during the late 90s; "No Holds Barred? More like No Profit Allowed."

=== Critical response ===
The film was panned by critics, with a 10% approval rating on Rotten Tomatoes based on 21 reviews.

Film critic Brian Orndorf described the film as "tremendously crude, unapologetically manipulative, and aimed directly at easily entertained 13-year-old boys."

Michael Wilmington of the Los Angeles Times gave the film a positive review and wrote: "The movie never takes itself seriously and director Tom Wright (TV's Beauty and the Beast) has fun with the wrestling montages. Hogan himself has an appealing screen presence—like a gallant teddy bear who goes berserk every 10 minutes or so."

The Philadelphia Inquirer's Desmond Ryan remarked:

For months now, Dustin Hoffman and Robert De Niro have been sitting in their dens and nervously clutching their Oscars.

They knew that an unprecedented challenge was looming to their pre-eminent standing among American actors—the arrival of Hulk Hogan in his first starring role in a movie.

Rumor had it—and No Holds Barred confirms—that the great man would do a love scene and even essay an emotional breakdown at the hospital bed of his crippled brother.

There is no limit to what the Hulk can do on stage and screen.

After all, who's going to summon the nerve to tell him he can't? He may one day want to try Hamlet and I can see the billing now: Hulk Hogan vs. Felonious Polonius.

But, from what I hope is a safe distance, let me point out a few things about Hulk's work in No Holds Barred. It needs work, Hulk. To watch him is to behold the craft of acting placed in a half nelson and gleefully choked to death.

Cretins and people who take professional wrestling seriously—and I'm bound to say the distinction between the two groups is lost on me—will flock to No Holds Barred and they will not be disappointed.

Pro wrestling is notorious for grotesquely bad acting masquerading as entertainment.

And that—along with a screenplay and direction of spectacular crudity—is what you get in No Holds Barred.

Hulk Hogan popped up in Rocky III, and in No Holds Barred he achieves the rare feat of making Sylvester Stallone seem sophisticated.

[...]

Clearly, Hulk is a man of many parts – though none of them should include a part in another movie.

It's all right, Dustin and Robert. You can go back to sleep now.

The Chicago Tribune's Gene Siskel remarked, simply, that No Holds Barred "is utterly lacking in the campy quality of the World Wrestling Federation telecasts."

In his 1991 review of Suburban Commando, Roger Ebert recalled that "despite the fact that [Hulk Hogan's] public image is often aimed at children [...] his first film, 'No Holds Barred' (1989) was surprisingly violent, sexist and blood-soaked."

Each critic gave the film a thumbs down on their series Siskel & Ebert & the Movies and was also on their list of the worst films of 1989.

Richard Harrington of The Washington Post said that "[Hogan's] performance is as dreadful as one might expect from a man with such limited skills outside the ring, made worse by a story that is at once more obvious and less inspired than your average Wrestlemania script. [...] 'No Holds Barred' makes Rocky look like 'Citizen Pain.'"

Wrote Stephen Holden of The New York Times:

In No Holds Barred, Hulk Hogan's first feature film, the blond, mustachioed wrestling idol plays a professional gladiator who is so ferocious he can reduce a gymnasium to rubble in five minutes flat and so sensitive that he spontaneously bursts into tears after his little brother is beaten up.

The fact that nothing about Mr. Hogan really adds up no doubt helps account for his popularity. His sober speaking voice outside of the ring does not match his wild roars when doing battle. The amused gleam in his eye hints at a canny intelligence behind the sinew and sweat. And his exaggeratedly stagy bouts make only a token attempt to look real. More than Sylvester Stallone or Arnold Schwarzenegger, Mr. Hogan behaves like a self-invented comic-book character sprung to life.

No Holds Barred, which opened yesterday at the Criterion 1 and other local theaters, is as cartoonish as its star.

Reviewing the Blu-ray in 2014, Felix Vasquez Jr. of Cinema Crazed wrote: "Hogan as The Ripper is a force of nature here, and he makes "No Holds Barred" in to a fun action cartoon."

== Other media ==
=== No Holds Barred: The Match/The Movie ===
No Holds Barred: The Match/The Movie, as the event was billed, was shown on pay-per-view by the World Wrestling Federation (WWF, renamed WWE in 2002) on December 27, 1989. The program consisted of the film in its entirety, followed by a match previously recorded at a Wrestling Challenge taping on December 12 at the Nashville Municipal Auditorium in Nashville, Tennessee. It was one of the company's few PPV events that were not available on the WWE Network that launched in 2014.
