= The Destiny of Marty Fine =

- Directed by: Michael Hacker
- Written by: Michael Hacker; Mark Ruffalo
- Story by: Mark Ruffalo
- Produced by: Jeffrey Miller
- Starring: Norman Fell; Michael Ironside; Alan Gelfant; Catherine Keener; James LeGros
- Cinematography: Melinda Sue Gordon
- Edited by: Gabriella Cristiani; Lee Grubin; Tammis Chandler; Barbara Boguski
- Distributed by: One-Two Prods. Inc.
- Release date: March 16, 1996 (South by Southwest)
- Running time: 80 minutes
- Country: United States
- Language: English

The Destiny of Marty Fine is a 1996 American drama film directed by Michael Hacker, and starring Norman Fell, Michael Ironside, Alan Gelfant, Catherine Keener and James LeGros. Mark Ruffalo co-wrote the film with Hacker.

== Plot ==
Marty wants to open a boxing training camp in Utah for inner-city kids from Los Angeles. Due to his witnessing a Mob murder, a local boss wants to make sure Marty stays silent. But Marty wants to fight back. He goes to his girlfriend Lena. However, both Lena and Marty's sister is unwilling to help him because of his unreliability. Marty still refuses to give up and seeks out Lena again in an attempt to avoid his destiny.

== Cast ==
- Alan Gelfant as Marty Fine
- James LeGros as "Grill"
- Catherine Keener as Lena
- Michael Ironside as Capelli
- Glenn Plummer as Mike
- John Diehl as Deke
- Sandra Seacat as "Gypsy"
- Norman Fell as Daryl
- René Assa as Sal
- Mark Ruffalo as Brett
- Katherine LaNasa as Amy

== Release ==
The film was released on March 16, 1996 at South by Southwest.

== Reception ==
Joe Leydon of Variety gave the film a negative review, calling it "a genuine eyesore."

Nathan Rabin of The A.V. Club also gave the film a negative review and wrote, "Unfortunately, it's also not a very good movie."
