= Alvin and the Chipmunks Meet Frankenstein =

- VHS cover
- Directed by: Kathi Castillo
- Screenplay by: John Loy
- Based on: Alvin and the Chipmunks by: Ross Bagdasarian
- Produced by: Kathi Castillo
- Starring: Ross Bagdasarian Jr.; Janice Karman
- Edited by: Jay Bixsen
- Music by: Mark Watters
- Production companies: Bagdasarian Productions; Universal Cartoon Studios
- Distributed by: Universal Studios Home Video
- Release date: September 28, 1999
- Running time: 78 minutes
- Country: United States
- Language: English

Alvin and the Chipmunks Meet Frankenstein is a 1999 American animated comedy horror film produced by Bagdasarian Productions and Universal Cartoon Studios and distributed by Universal Studios Home Video. It is directed by Kathi Castillo, written by John Loy and based on characters from Alvin and the Chipmunks and Mary Shelley's 1818 novel Frankenstein; or, The Modern Prometheus. This is the first of two Alvin and the Chipmunks direct-to-video films, and the first of three Universal Cartoon Studios productions to be animated overseas by Tama Production in Tokyo, Japan. This is the only animated Alvin and the Chipmunks film where the Chipettes do not appear.

It was followed up a year later by a standalone sequel, titled Alvin and the Chipmunks Meet the Wolfman.

== Plot ==
The Chipmunks are performing at a theme park called Majestic Movie Studios. While taking a break from their concert, the Chipmunks get lost, and eventually get locked inside the park. They find their way to the "Frankenstein's Castle" attraction, where a real Dr. Victor Frankenstein is working on his monster. The monster is brought to life, and when the boys are discovered by the doctor, sends it in pursuit of the Chipmunks, seeking to use them as potential test subjects. In their escape, the monster retrieves Theodore's dropped teddy bear.

The monster follows the Chipmunks home and returns the bear to Theodore, who quickly befriends him. The Chipmunks teach the monster (whom Theodore has nicknamed "Frankie") how to be nicer and make friends. Dave goes to the park to book a concert that night to celebrate the premiere of an anticipated film in a attempt to get the Chipmunks their jobs back. Dr. Frankenstein tracks Frankie to the Chipmunks' home, and, angered at the monster's benevolence, kidnaps Alvin. Simon, Theodore, and Frankie hurry back to the park to rescue him.

Dr. Frankenstein force-feeds Alvin a potion and induces a powerful electrical shock. Alvin is released by Frankie, and after Simon swipes the doctor's potions book, the four of them escape back into the park. Shortly after, the process Alvin underwent takes effect, transforming him into a zany cartoon monster. Alvin escapes to the premiere, causing chaos and havoc in his path. Using the potions book, Simon and Theodore mix an antidote using various food items from a buffet and feed it to Alvin during his rampage. Alvin returns to normal, and the Chipmunks go to perform their concert.

Before the concert begins, Dr. Frankenstein attempts to transform Alvin back to his monster self, but is thwarted by Frankie, which leads to an explosion. After the smoke clears, Theodore introduces Frankie to the public, promising that Frankie will bring no harm if treated nicely.

Sometime later, everything has returned to normal for Dave and the Chipmunks, while Frankie, who has now gained the ability to speak (albeit in a high-pitch voice similar to the Chipmunks), gains a job as a backlot tour guide for Majestic Movie Studios with the boys' help. Meanwhile, Dr. Frankenstein is revealed to have been given the job of being the studio's mascot, Sammy Squirrel, as punishment for the chaos he caused (combined with the fact he ended up getting stuck in the suit when he attempted to wear it as a disguise), much to his dissatisfaction.

== Voice cast ==
- Ross Bagdasarian Jr. as Alvin Seville / Simon Seville / David "Dave" Seville
- Janice Karman as Theodore Seville
- Michael Bell as Doctor Victor Frankenstein, Person in Mob and Delivery Man
- Frank Welker as Frankie, the Frankenstein's monster, Man dressed up as Frankenstein, Sammy Squirrel, and Movie Director
- Jim Meskimen as Mr. Yesman, Bud Wiley, Person in Mob, Boy #2 and Police Officer #2
- Dee Bradley Baker as Tour Guide Phil and Person in Mob
- Mary Kay Bergman as Miss Miller, Mother at the theme park, Little Boy, Boy #1, Female Bouncer
- Kevin Michael Richardson as Man with Camera, Male Bouncer and Security Guard
- Susan Boyd as Police Officer #1, Mother at the playground and Olivia D'Handlotion

== Production ==
The film was in production around 1998 alongside direct-to-video sequels to An American Tail. Universal Home Entertainment acquired the home video rights for The Chipmunk Adventure in the hopes of creating a long-lasting direct-to-video film series matching the success of The Land Before Time.

== Songs ==
All original songs were written by Michele Brourman and Amanda McBroom:

1. "Things Out There"
2. "If a Monster Came in Our Room"
3. "If You Wanna Have Friends"
4. "Dem Bones"
5. "Sammy Squirrel's Theme Song"
