= Sick Girl (2008 film) =

- Directed by: Eben McGarr
- Written by: Eben McGarr
- Produced by: P. James Keitel; John P. McGarr; Eben McGarr
- Starring: Leslie Andrews; Charlie Trepany; Katherine Macanufo; Graham Denman; Stephen Geoffreys; Andy Signore
- Cinematography: C.J. Roy; John Carreon; Grant Culwell
- Edited by: John F. Conway
- Music by: John F. Conway; Eben McGarr
- Distributed by: Synapse Films (US)
- Release date: 2008
- Country: United States
- Language: English

Sick Girl is a 2008 American independent horror film written and directed by Eben McGarr.

Sick Girl marks the return of Stephen Geoffreys to the horror genre after a 17-year absence.

== Plot ==
Izzy is a troubled teenage girl who decides to attack and murder her little brother's bullies utilizing skills taught to her by her older brother Rusty, who is away in the Marines. She both lusts after and idolizes Rusty to the point where she overlooks signs that he is anything but perfect, such as his failure to call his family and reconnect.

After causing a massacre on the school bus, Izzy manages to trap and imprison a couple of the bullies in the trunk of her car, showing no remorse or compassion when one of them begs to be set free. She also kidnaps three additional bullies and goads one of them, Tommy, into killing the other two. He succeeds in killing one but is unable to kill the second. Izzy finishes the second bully off and imprisons Tommy with the two surviving bullies she had in the trunk. She takes them to the barn by her home and torments them further before going inside to open Christmas presents with her little brother Kevin and Barney. Izzy gifts Kevin a gun taken from one of the bullies, which concerns Barney.

The deaths on the school bus are reported on the news and are believed to be the work of the missing bullies. Izzy has a flashback to her being angry at Rusty's girlfriend for kissing him goodbye before leaving to join the Marines. Enraged by this memory, Izzy goes over to her house and murders her. Deciding to get rid of the remaining bullies, Izzy brutalizes them but is caught by Barney, who she then kills as well. She's surprised to discover that Kevin had come into the barn as well and witnessed the murders. Izzy tries to explain and calm Kevin, but is unsuccessful. Horrified by what she's done, he goes into the house and commits suicide by shooting himself in the head.

In a flashback to an undetermined previous time, two Marines go to her house. Although there is no sound in this scene, it's obvious they are there to tell her that Rusty died in the war. She lashes out at them, and the movie ends as it cuts back to the present to show Izzy walking away from the burning barn.

== Cast ==
- Leslie Andrews as Izzy
- Charlie Trepany as Kevin
- John P. McGarr as Barney
- Katherine Macanufo as Stephanie Wallace
- Graham Denman as Michael Doyle
- Stephen Geoffreys as Mr. Putski
- Ian Villalobos as Tommy McGowan
- Andy Ignore as Jugs
- Justin Marco as Corey Chapman
- Peter Partida Jr. as Rudy Browning
- Chris W King as Rusty
- Caerly Hill as Rusty's Girlfriend

== Release ==
Sick Girl was given a screening at the Vista Theater in Los Angeles, California on August 16, 2008, as well at the Phoenix Fear Film Festival.

== Soundtrack ==
- "Family Tree" by Dennis Versteeg and Aaron Moreland
- "Gary The Goat" by Dennis Versteeg and Eben McGarr
- "So F*cked Up" and "I Want'em Dead" by Sloppy Seconds
- "Sunday Morning Letter" and "Caribbean Love Song" by Patrick Sellars

== Reception ==
Sick Girl received reviews from Ginger Nuts of Horror and Dread Central, the latter of which gave the film 3 out of 5 blades and wrote that "You’ll spend a lot of time waiting for the next horrific thing to happen, but when it does you’ll likely feel it was worth the wait." DVD Talk also reviewed Sick Girl, stating "Devastating and seriously messed-up, Sick Girl brings life back to the horror genre just in the nick of time." HorrorNews.net noted that the movie was "Creative…cold and brutal".

=== Awards ===
- Phoenix Fear Film Festival Best feature: 2008
