= Fraternity Vacation =

1985 American sex comedy teen film by James Frawley

- Theatrical release poster
- Directed by: James Frawley
- Written by: Lindsay Harrison
- Produced by: Robert C. Peters; Larry A. Thompson (executive producer)
- Starring: Stephen Geoffreys; Sheree J. Wilson; Cameron Dye; Tim Robbins; Leigh McCloskey; Matt McCoy; John Vernon
- Cinematography: Paul Ryan
- Music by: Brad Fiedel
- Production company: New World Pictures
- Distributed by: New World Pictures
- Release date: April 12, 1985
- Running time: 84 min.
- Country: United States
- Language: English
- Budget: $3-4 million
- Box office: $3,333,306

Fraternity Vacation is a 1985 American sex comedy teen film starring Stephen Geoffreys as a nerdy pledge to the Theta Pi Gamma fraternity at Iowa State, with Tim Robbins and Cameron Dye as Theta Pi Gamma frat boys (or, as they are known to their Iowa State frat rivals, "Theta Pigs"). On spring break in Palm Springs, California, some boys compete for the affections of a sophisticated co-ed, played by Sheree J. Wilson.

== Plot ==
Despite being saddled with a nerdy pledge during a Palm Springs weekend, two frat brothers vie for a poolside blonde.

== Cast ==
- Stephen Geoffreys as Wendell Tvedt
- Sheree J. Wilson as Ashley Taylor
- Cameron Dye as Joe Gillespie
- Leigh McCloskey as Charles "Chas" Lawlor III
- Tim Robbins as Larry "Mother" Tucker
- Matt McCoy as J.C. Springer
- Amanda Bearse as Nicole Ferret
- John Vernon as Chief Ferret
- Nita Talbot as Mrs. Ferret
- Barbara Crampton as Chrissie
- Kathleen Kinmont as Marianne
- Max Wright as Millard Tvedt
- Julie Payne as Naomi Tvedt
- Franklin Ajaye as Harry
- Charles Rocket as Mac "Madman Mac"
- Britt Ekland as Eyvette

== Production ==
During production, alternate titles considered for the film included Wendell, Party, Party, Party, American Slang, Party Animals, and Beginner’s Luck.

== Reception ==
Fraternity Vacation was not a major success at the box office, earning just over $3 million. Critical reception for the film was also predominantly unfavorable. Roger Ebert gave the film one star out of four:

Don't get me wrong. I have nothing against dumb sex comedies. All I object to is the fact that Fraternity Vacation is playing with half a deck—the male half. The men are the characters and the women are the objects.

Gene Siskel gave the film zero stars, calling it "yet another dimwitted college sex comedy, a film that doesn't have a single redeeming facet." Janet Maslin of The New York Times wrote, "The material is more smirky than funny, and the cast isn't particularly likable." Variety wrote, "Neither wildly gross nor unbearably funny, pic nevertheless maintains a cheerful attitude throughout as the single minded teenage characters pursue the opposite sex with all the subtlety of dogs checking each other out." Michael Wilmington of the Los Angeles Times thought that the film did have a "bright cast" and "skillfully brisk direction," but was defeated by a script "devoid of surprises and ideas—and often characters." A review in The Tech (MIT) said that the film was a poor example of its genre, and "not worth seeing unless you're really in the mood for this type of movie".
