= Alan Gelfant =

American film actor (born 1957)

- Born: May 21, 1957 (age 69); Syracuse, New York, United States
- Occupation: Actor

Alan Gelfant (born May 21, 1957) is an American film actor.

== Life and career ==
Gelfant was born in Syracuse, New York. He has acted in more than 50 plays and dozens of TV shows and movies, including leading roles in the films Next Stop Wonderland, The Destiny of Marty Fine, Men in Scoring Position, Turn of Faith and Apartment 12. He is the co-founder of the annual Stella Adler Theatre – One Act Play Festival in Los Angeles. He was hired by HBO to direct Colin Quinn's one man show in LA, The Seven Sacraments.

Since moving to the Upper Valley area of New Hampshire and Vermont, Gelfant has produced, directed and acted in performances at the Parish Players, New London Barn, Hopkins Center at Dartmouth College, and various other regional theaters. He has earned high praise for a variety of acting roles, including Eddie Carbone in A View From The Bridge, HAMM in Beckett's EndGame, Weston in Curse of The Starving Class, Ned Weeks in The Normal Heart at the Chadler Arts Center, directed by Dan Butler.

As a director he has won two OWL Awards; in 2010 for Best Comedy, Odd Couple and 2011 for Best Play of The Year directing and producing William Inge's death row drama The Last Pad, which he co-produced with the ACLU of New Hampshire and Vermont.

Gelfant has also taught acting, play writing, and film making at several area high schools. He worked for two years as a teaching assistant for the Institute for Writing and Rhetoric Program at Dartmouth College. He earned a MALS degree with a concentration in creative writing from the MALS program at Dartmouth College.

== Selected filmography ==
Year	Title	Role	Other notes
2002	The Dogwalker	Glen	
2001	Monkeybone	Dr. Edelstein	
2000	Desert Saints	FBI Agent Byron Sadowski	
2000	Hero	Sergeant Warshaw	Short
1999	Wildflowers	Wolf	
1999	To Have & to Hold	Aidan O'Reilly	TV series
1998	Next Stop Wonderland	Alan Monteiro	
1996	The Crow: City of Angels	Bassett	
