= René Assa =

Egyptian-born American film, stage and television actor

- Assa in Battlestar Galactica, 1978
- Born: November 15, 1944; Cairo, Egypt
- Died: March 10, 2002 (aged 57); Los Angeles, California, U.S.
- Occupations: Film, stage and television actor

René Assa (November 15, 1944 – March 10, 2002) was an Egyptian-born American film, stage and television actor.

== Life and career ==
Assa was born in Cairo. In his teenage years, he moved to the United States, and performed on stage in Los Angeles, California. He began his screen career in 1973, appearing in the television film The Third Girl from the Left. In 1975, he appeared in the television programs Cannon and Columbo.

Later in his career, Assa guest-starred in television programs including The Rockford Files, Airwolf, The Six Million Dollar Man, Jake and the Fatman, The Love Boat, Battlestar Gallactica, Quantum Leap, The A-Team and The Facts of Life. He also appeared in films such as The Destiny of Marty Fine, Raid on Entebbe, Why Me?, Postcards from the Edge and 976-Evil II.

Assa retired from acting in 2001, last appearing in the film Off Key.

== Death ==
Assa died from lung cancer in Los Angeles, California on March 10, 2002, at the age of 57.
