= J. J. Cohen =

American actor

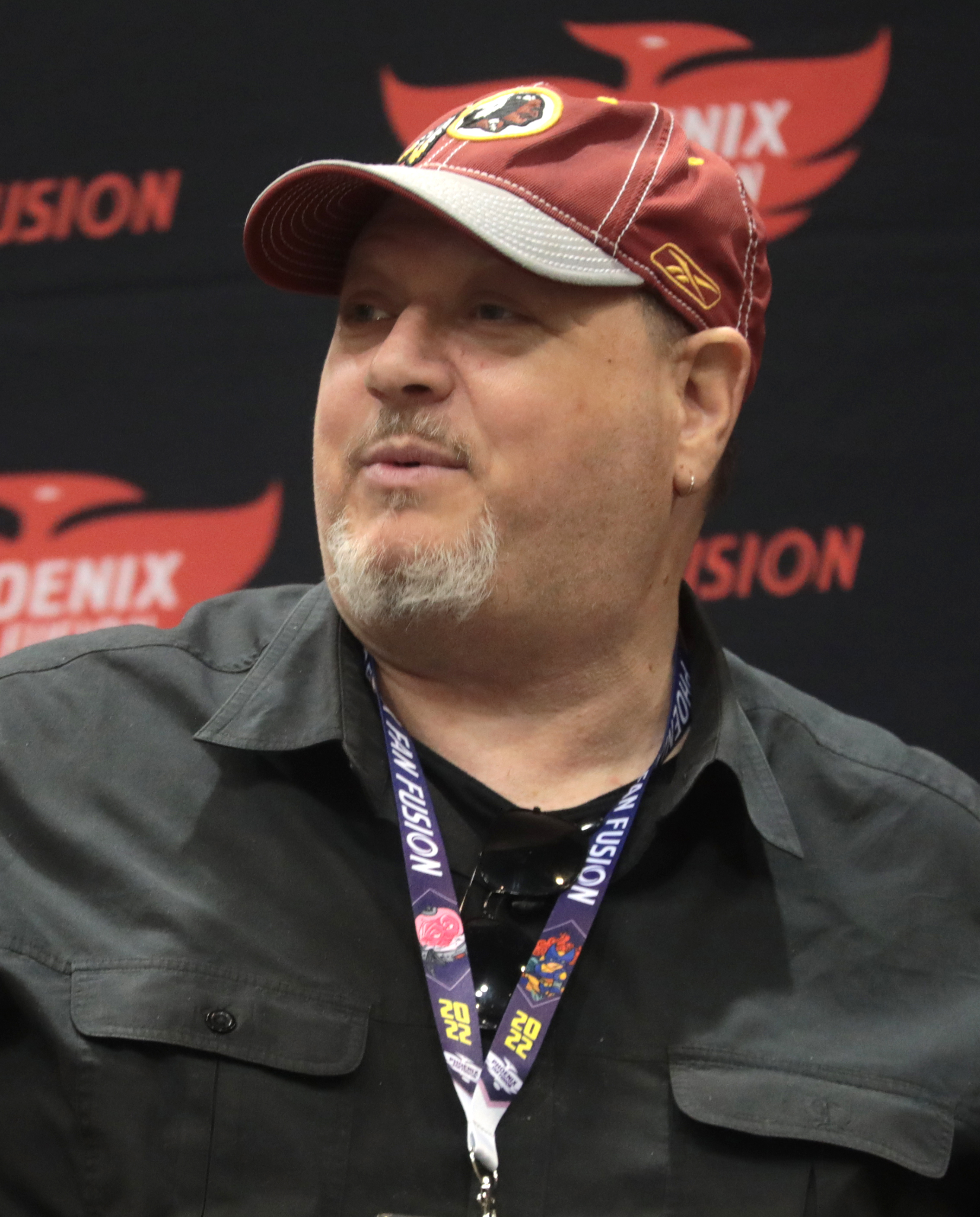
- Cohen at the 2022 Phoenix Fan Fusion
- Born: Jeffrey Jay Cohen; June 22, 1965 (age 59)
- Occupation: Actor
- Years active: 1985–2002

Jeffrey Jay Cohen (born June 22, 1965) is an American actor who has appeared in film and on television. Cohen's first feature film was in the 1985 film Paradise Motel. It was not until 1985, he would get his big role in the film Back to the Future as Skinhead, a member of Biff Tannen's gang. In 1989, he reprised his role in Back to the Future Part II, a year later, he appeared in Back to the Future Part III as a member of Needles' gang.

According to the DVD commentary, he was originally up for the role of Biff but did not appear physically intimidating when standing against the 6' 0½" Eric Stoltz who was originally cast as Marty McFly. Writer and producer Bob Gale noted that, had the much shorter Michael J. Fox been cast as Marty from the beginning as they had hoped, Cohen probably would have played Biff.

Cohen's other film roles include the 1985 film Secret Admirer. He starred in the 1986 drama film Fire with Fire. Cohen's other big role was in the 1987 action film The Principal as White Zac. He also appeared in the 1988 horror film 976-EVIL. Cohen's most recent film was in the 2000 film Almost Famous.

Cohen has appeared in television series, including V: The Series, Baywatch, Amazing Stories (The Mission), Pacific Blue and Providence.

== Selected filmography ==
- 1985: Paradise Motel as "Shooter" Spinelli
- 1985: Secret Admirer as Barry
- 1985: Back to the Future as Joey "Skinhead"
- 1986: Fire with Fire as Myron, The Mapmaker
- 1987: The Principal as Zac "White Zac"
- 1987: Daddy as Dewey
- 1988: 976-EVIL as Marcus
- 1989: Back to the Future Part II as Joey "Skinhead"
- 1990: Back to the Future Part III as Needles' Gang Member
- 1994: Object of Obsession as Homeless Man
- 1998: The Night Caller as Bicyclist
- 2000: Almost Famous as Scully, The Roadie
