= Stephen Geoffreys =

American actor (born 1964)

- Born: Stephen Geoffrey Miller; November 22, 1964 (age 61); Cincinnati, Ohio, U.S.
- Other name: Sam Ritter
- Occupation: Actor
- Years active: 1984–present

Stephen Geoffrey Miller (born November 22, 1964), known professionally as Stephen Geoffreys, is an American actor who played high school misfit-turned vampire "Evil Ed" in the 1985 horror film Fright Night. He additionally appeared in Heaven Help Us (1985), Fraternity Vacation (1985), At Close Range (1986), and 976-EVIL (1988), and a few gay pornographic films in the 1990s.

== Life and career ==
Born Stephen Geoffrey Miller in Cincinnati, Ohio, he first began acting on the stage. In 1984, he was nominated for Broadway's Tony Award for "Best Performance by a Featured Actor in a Musical" for his performance in a play based on The Human Comedy. For this role, he won the Theatre World Award in 1984.

Geoffreys appeared in several horror and teen films during the 1980s, including Heaven Help Us, Fraternity Vacation, and 976-EVIL. He is best known for playing the teenage misfit-turned vampire "Evil" Ed in the 1985 vampire horror film Fright Night, also starring Roddy McDowall, William Ragsdale, and Chris Sarandon. He was asked to reprise his "Evil" Ed role in Fright Night Part 2 but turned it down to play the lead in 976-EVIL. He also played a supporting part in the critically acclaimed drama At Close Range in 1986, followed by an episode of Amazing Stories and The Chair (1988).

During the 1990s, Geoffreys appeared for several years in gay pornographic movies, using the alias Sam Ritter.

Geoffreys returned to horror in a supporting role as "Mr. Putski" in the independent film Sick Girl, released in October 2007, after an almost 9-year absence from mainstream film. He went on to play a lead role in the horror film Do Not Disturb. He later appeared in the horror film Emerging Past, which also featured actor Brooke McCarter of The Lost Boys fame. As part of the Mad Monster Party convention on March 28, 2015, Geoffreys wore his Evil Ed costume.

== Filmography ==
- 1985: Heaven Help Us as Williams
- 1985: Fraternity Vacation as Wendell Tvedt
- 1985: Fright Night as Evil Ed
- 1985: The Twilight Zone (TV Series) as Will (segment "The Elevator")
- 1986: At Close Range as Aggie
- 1987: Amazing Stories as Alan Webster
- 1988: The Chair as Roach
- 1988: 976-EVIL as Hoax Arthur Wilmoth
- 1990: Moon 44 as Cookie
- 1991: Wild Blade as Colt
- 1998: Famous Again
- 2007: Sick Girl as Mr. Putski
- 2010: New Terminal Hotel as Don Malek
- 2010: Mr. Hush as Stark
- 2011: The Diary of Randy Rose as Brother (voice)
- 2011: Emerging Past as Cameron
- 2011: Bite Marks as Walsh
- 2013: Do Not Disturb as Donald Malek
- 2014: Lazarus as Steven Wells
- 2017: The Emerging Past Director's Cut as Cameron
- 2017: Check Point as Grant

== Prizes and nominations ==
=== Theater ===
==== Tony Award ====
- 1984 The Human Comedy - nominated

==== Theatre World Award ====
- 1984 The Human Comedy - winner
