= House of the Wolf Man =

- Directed by: Eben McGarr
- Written by: Eben McGarr
- Produced by: John P. McGarr; Eben McGarr; Roland R. Rosenberg Jr.; David Sontag; Larry Sontag
- Starring: Ron Chaney; Dustin Fitzsimons; Sara Raftery
- Cinematography: Royce A. Dudley
- Edited by: Cyrus Navarro
- Music by: Nate Scott
- Distributed by: Taurus Entertainment Company
- Release date: 2009
- Country: United States
- Language: English

House of the Wolf Man is an American independent monster horror film produced in 2009 by My Way Pictures. The film was made as a homage to the Universal Monsters movies, and was shot in the same style. The film's star Ron Chaney is the great-grandson of Lon Chaney and the grandson of Lon Chaney Jr., both of whom starred in numerous Universal Monsters films.

== Plot ==
Dr. Bela Reinhardt (Ron Chaney) is a mad doctor who has invited five people to his castle to determine which of them shall inherit his estate. He has arranged for a competition of sorts. The winner will be chosen by process of...elimination. The visitors quickly realize they have made a terrible mistake in accepting Reinhardt's invitation, but are trapped like rats in a cage under the watchful eye of Reinhardt's ghoulish manservant, Barlow. They soon discover the castle is full of terrifying monsters such as the Wolf Man, Frankenstein's monster, and Dracula.

== Cast ==
- Ron Chaney as Bela Reinhardt
- Dustin Fitzsimons as Reed Chapel
- Jeremie Loncka as Conrad Sullivan
- Sara Raftery as Mary Chapel
- Cheryl Rodes as Elmira Cray
- Jim Thalman as Archibald Whitlock
- John McGarr as Barlow
- Billy Bussey as the Wolf Man
- Craig Dabbs as Frankenstein's Monster
- Michael R. Thomas as Dracula
- Saba Moor-Doucette as Vadoma

== Production notes ==
House of the Wolf Man is an homage to classic horror films, shot in black and white and 1:33 aspect ratio (full frame).
