= Alvin and the Chipmunks Meet the Wolfman =

- VHS cover
- Directed by: Kathi Castillo
- Screenplay by: John Loy
- Based on: Alvin and the Chipmunks by: Ross Bagdasarian
- Produced by: Kathi Castillo
- Starring: Ross Bagdasarian Jr.; Janice Karman; Miriam Flynn; E. G. Daily; Maurice LaMarche; Rob Paulsen; Frank Welker; April Winchell
- Edited by: Jay Bixsen
- Music by: Mark Watters
- Production companies: Bagdasarian Productions; Universal Cartoon Studios (Note: Animation outsourced to Tama Productions.)
- Distributed by: Universal Studios Home Video
- Release date: August 29, 2000
- Running time: 77 minutes
- Country: United States
- Language: English

Alvin and the Chipmunks Meet the Wolfman is a 2000 American animated musical comedy horror film produced by Bagdasarian Productions and Universal Cartoon Studios and based on characters from Alvin and the Chipmunks. It is the second Alvin and the Chipmunks direct-to-video film following Alvin and the Chipmunks Meet Frankenstein, and the third of three Universal Cartoon Studios productions to be animated overseas by Tama Productions in Tokyo, Japan. The film introduces the voices of Maurice LaMarche and Miriam Flynn. This is the second and final Alvin and the Chipmunks production to be traditionally animated.

== Plot ==
After watching various horror films, Alvin has nightmares of meeting the Wolfman. He claims to Simon and David Seville that this is because their new neighbor, Lawrence Talbot, makes him nervous and speculates that he has a monstrous secret. When Alvin causes an experimental accident at the school auditorium, and when Dave gets a call from Miss Miller about the Chipettes being frightened by a mysterious presence while walking home with the Chipmunks one night, Dave and Principal Milliken decide that Alvin should be pulled out of his role as Mr. Hyde in their school play for Dr. Jekyll and Mr. Hyde. Theodore replaces Alvin's role to boost his self-esteem. Alvin is given the role of the butler instead, and Dave confiscates Alvin's monster collection.

Alvin and Simon begin searching for proof that Talbot is a werewolf. Meanwhile, Theodore is bitten by what he believes to be a large dog on his way home, after a meeting with his crush Eleanor. The next day at breakfast, Theodore wants to start eating meat. Later at the rehearsal, he gives a terrifying performance as Mr. Hyde to great applause. He soon begins transforming into a werewolf by night but behaves like a harmless puppy; by day, he develops a rude, sarcastic personality. Realizing that their brother is cursed with lycanthropy, Alvin and Simon search for a way to cure Theodore, and save the play, without Dave finding out. Finding no solutions, they decide to take up advice from eccentric psychic Madame Raya, who predicts that Theodore will become a savage werewolf by the next full moon. She suggests knocking him unconscious with a silver weapon. Alvin later breaks into Talbot's home and steals his cane, topped with a silver wolf head. Theodore splits the cane in two after Alvin knocks him on the head with it, but he is not cured. As he runs away with the cane, however, he knocks it into Dave. That night, Dave tries to apologize to Talbot. During the conversation, Talbot mentions his cane's head was made from the silver bullets that killed his grandfather. When Dave asks why he was attacked, Talbot tries to answer but transforms into a werewolf under the light of the full moon. Dave, realizing Alvin was telling the truth, hurries to the school to warn the students but is knocked unconscious after running into a pole. Talbot makes his way inside and chases after Alvin.

During the play, Theodore transforms again, now a fully dangerous werewolf, and pursues Eleanor, but after cornering her, the crystal necklace that Theodore gave Eleanor earlier shines in the moonlight, causing Theodore to remember his feelings towards her and flee. Eleanor follows him, determined to help him, only to be almost attacked by Mr. Talbot, whom the chipmunks realize is the same werewolf that bit Theodore. Theodore and Talbot battle until Theodore bites Talbot, reverting both to their normal forms. Simon explains to everyone how the bite cured them by causing the effect to reverse on them both. Alvin runs up to the stage to join in the applause from the crowd, who believes the entire incident was just part of the play. At the wrap party, Talbot thanks Theodore for releasing him from his family curse and announces he will succeed Milliken as the new school principal while she takes on a "less stressful" job riding on rickety bridges in South America. Dave, who wakes up and realizes the wolf's made it there, runs to the school in time, and just as he was about to kill Mr. Talbot by hitting him on the head, the Chipmunks stop him and tell him that Theodore had fought a werewolf before and had released him from his curse, much to his confusion and relief. The film ends with both the Chipettes and the Chipmunks both performing an original song for the partygoers titled "Everything's Gonna Be Alright".

== Voice cast ==
- Ross Bagdasarian Jr. as Alvin Seville / Simon Seville / David "Dave" Seville
- Janice Karman as Theodore Seville / Brittany Miller / Jeanette Miller / Eleanor Miller
- Maurice LaMarche as Mr. Lawrence Talbot / The Wolfman
- Miriam Flynn as Principal Milliken
- April Winchell as Madame Raya
- Rob Paulsen as Mr. Rochelle
- Dody Goodman as Miss Miller (archive recording)
- E. G. Daily as Nathan
- Frank Welker as Special Vocal Effects for Theodore and Mr. Talbot's werewolf forms

== Songs ==
1. "Munks on a Mission" - Alvin and Simon
2. "Monster Out in You" - The Chipmunks
3. "Everything's Gonna Be Alright" - The Chipmunks and the Chipettes

== Release ==
Universal Studios Home Video released the film on VHS on August 29, 2000, alongside Monster Mash and Archie's Weird Mysteries: Archie and the Riverdale Vampires as part of its "Haunted House of Fun" promotion. The film was released as part of the "Monster Bash Fun Pack" DVD set in September 2004. In 2007, the film was included in a two-disc DVD set with Alvin and the Chipmunks Meet Frankenstein titled "A Scare-riffic Double Feature", and re-released with a different cover on March 11, 2008.
