= John P. McGarr =

American actor

John McGarr
- Born: John Patrick McGarr; September 25, 1964; Woodside, Queens, New York, U.S.
- Died: March 25, 2010 (aged 45); Indianapolis, Indiana, U.S.
- Occupations: Actor; Producer
- Years active: 1996–2010

John Patrick McGarr (September 25, 1964 – March 25, 2010) was an American actor and film producer.

== Biography ==
=== Early life ===
McGarr was born in Woodside, Queens, New York and attended Corpus Christi Grammar School. His parents were Maryann Allen from Woodside, New York and Eben Ray McGarr Sr. from Duncan, Oklahoma. He had two sisters and two brothers. John attended Aviation High School in Long Island City, Queens. He attended Queensboro College in Flushing, Queens.

=== Acting career ===
In addition to many television and film appearances, John McGarr was also a stand up comedian, having appeared in Las Vegas, Los Angeles and New York comedy clubs. His concentration was on classic horror films and was a participant in many Horror Conventions across the country. He moved to Los Angeles, California in 1994 and began appearing in movies and performing stand up comedy. He became a regular guest on Talkshow with Spike Feresten.

=== Producing career ===
McGarr became a noted producer when he formed My Way Pictures. My Way Pictures produces indie films working closely with the project developers to obtain their desired outcome. He worked on award-winning films such as Sick Girl, which won the Best feature award at the Phoenix Fear Film Festival in 2008, and House of the Wolf Man.

=== Death ===
While in Indianapolis on March 25, 2010, filming a documentary at the Horror Hound Convention, McGarr was struck by an automobile as he walked down the street and was killed by the drunk driver, Charles Beasley, at 10:30 am; he died instantly. McGarr was buried in St. John's Cemetery in Middle Village, New York.

== Filmography ==
- Blockhead (2010)
- Shadows in Paradise (2010)
- House of the Wolf Man (2009)
- Hotel California (2008)
- Your Name Here (2008)
- Sick Girl (2007)
- The Boys & Girls Guide to Getting Down (2006)
- Dead & Deader (2006)
- Night All Day (2000)
- Back to Back (1996)
- Wonderland (1997)

=== TV series ===
- Gene Simmons Family Jewels (2008)
- lonelygirl15 (2007)
- Talkshow with Spike Feresten (2006–2009)

== Awards ==
Phoenix Fear Film Festival

- Best feature: Sick Girl (2008)
