= Hollywood marriage =

Glamorous, often short-lived high society marriage between celebrities

A Hollywood marriage originally meant a glamorous high society marriage between celebrities involved in the US film industry, as "Hollywood" is a common metonymous term for that industry; such marriages are more commonly known as supercouples in modern parlance. However, the term has grown to also have strong negative connotations of a marriage that is of short duration and quickly ends in separation or divorce. The term developed the negative connotations fairly early; by the 1930s, a "Hollywood marriage" was a marriage both glamorous and short-lived.

== Issues ==
Sympathetic views of celebrities point out that in Hollywood, it is mostly the bad marriages that are documented by the media, giving a skewed perspective that might make "Hollywood marriages" appear to have a worse success rate than they have in reality. In 1972 Bob Thomas of the Associated Press remarked specifically about the tendency to ignore lasting celebrity marriages with the examples he gave including Bob Hope's marriage to Dolores Hope and Rosalind Russell's marriage to producer Frederick Brisson.

Negative views of Hollywood marriages take the position that the divorce rates are indeed unusually high among celebrities and that this is caused by faults within Hollywood as a culture or by personal faults of the celebrities themselves. They point to the usage of weddings as publicity stunts, the egotism or immaturity of celebrities or "celebrity culture", and high rates of infidelity or promiscuity. Bee Wilson, in an article for The Daily Telegraph, critiqued "Hollywood marriages" for often being based on the unrealistic dreams of what she termed "permanent children", although she points to some classic Hollywood couples—such as Lauren Bacall and Humphrey Bogart, or Paul Newman and Joanne Woodward—as exceptions to these criticisms. While the introduction to the Cultural Sociology of Divorce: An Encyclopedia edited by Robert E. Emery specifically mentions Hollywood divorces as epitomizing a "consumerist, throw-away-marriage view found in the West."

The actors and entertainers themselves vary in perspective on the commonality or reason for divorce in Hollywood. In 1961 Anne Baxter stated Hollywood was "the most difficult place in America for marriage" due, in part, to the "terrible extremes of success and failure" both spouses may face. In a 1964 interview Mitzi Gaynor, who would remain married to the husband mentioned in the interview until his death (in 2006), took the more "defensive" position that "Hollywood" couples look different mostly because "everything we do is magnified." However, she conceded they might be slightly different because "you have to be a little off-center to get into this business in the first place."

Beyond anecdote or opinion, the actual evidence on the matter is complicated by differing definitions of who qualifies as a "celebrity" or "Hollywood." A study from Radford University placed "dancers and choreographers" as the occupations having the highest percent currently divorced with "Entertainers and performers, sports and related workers, all other" still being above average at tenth. That placed them between "Nursing, psychiatric, and home health aides" at ninth and "Baggage porters and concierges" at eleventh. In 1900, even before the modern film industry had coalesced, in an era where concert saloons and minstrel shows were the predominant form of entertainment, "actors, professional showmen" were listed as having the highest divorce rate of occupations. A Forbes article placed "professional athletes and entertainers" together and with a high divorce rate.

A study of American couples in Demography found that, on the whole, wealth correlates against divorce, at least for couples with a net worth of up to $400,000.

== Entertainers married a year or less ==
The idea that the term "Hollywood marriage" equates to something short-term is sometimes displayed by citing celebrities who had marriages that ended in divorce, separation, or annulment within approximately one year. The following examples of that are primarily restricted to marriages involving a notable actor, entertainer or director linked to Hollywood in some way and which ended in divorce or annulment. Note that the vast majority of the examples are from the 1970s onward; this is in part because no-fault divorce became legalized in that era, which increased the ease and number of divorces overall. (In much of the early 20th century, there was a one-year waiting period to finalize a divorce in California, which was later repealed.)

Couple	Duration	Dates	Notes	Source
Britney Spears and Jason Alexander	56 hours	January 2004	Annulled	
Nicolas Cage and Erika Koike	4 days	March 23–27, 2019	Annulled	
Elliott Lewis and Ann Wigton	5 days	August 30 – September 4, 1940	Annulled	
Michelle Phillips and Dennis Hopper	8 days	October 31 – November 8, 1970		
Francesca Eastwood and Jordan Feldstein	8 days	November 17–25, 2013	Annulled. Feldstein was the brother of actors Jonah Hill and Beanie Feldstein; Eastwood is the daughter of Clint Eastwood and Frances Fisher.	
Robert Evans and Catherine Oxenberg	9 days	July 12–21, 1998	Evans's fifth of seven marriages. Annulled.	
Pamela Anderson and Jon Peters	12 days	January 20 – February 1, 2020	Marriage certificate never officially enacted.	
Patty Duke and Michael Tell	13 days	June 26 – July 9, 1970	Annulled. Marriage produced a child, Sean Astin, whom Duke mistakenly believed to be fathered by Desi Arnaz, Jr. at the time.	
Eddie Murphy and Tracey Edmonds	2 weeks	January 2008		
Mario Lopez and Ali Landry	18 days	April 24 – May 2004		
Drew Barrymore and Jeremy Thomas	19 days	February–March 1994		
Ken Strong and Rella Harrison	<1 month	December 1929	Strong, a pro football player, and Harrison, a stage actress legally known as Amelie Hunneman, separated during their honeymoon.	
Ernest Borgnine and Ethel Merman	42 days	June 27 – August 4, 1964	Separated August 4, divorce mutually requested October 21 and granted November 18.	
Kim Darby and James Westmoreland	47 days	1970		
Harlan Ellison and Loretta Patrick	7 weeks	1966	Ellison's third and shortest of five marriages.	
Ethel Merman and William Smith	2 months	1940–1941		
Milla Jovovich and Shawn Andrews	2 months	1992	Annulled	
Chris Kattan and Sunshine Deia Tutt	2 months	2008–2009		
Kim Kardashian and Kris Humphries	72 days	2011	Divorce was finalized in 2013	
Kid Rock and Pamela Anderson	121 days	July 29 – November 27, 2006		
Nicolas Cage and Lisa Marie Presley	108 days	2002	Divorce took over a year to be finalized.	
Bill Harrah and Bobbie Gentry	<4 months	December 18, 1969 – April 16, 1970	One of Harrah's seven marriages. Fictionalized in Gentry's hit song "Fancy."	
Colin Farrell and Amelia Warner	> 4 months	July 17 – November 2001		
Bradley Cooper and Jennifer Esposito	4 months	2006–2007		
Renée Zellweger and Kenny Chesney	4 months	May 2005 – 2005	Annulled	
Sophia Bush and Chad Michael Murray	5 months	April–September 2005	Separated (September 2005). Bush unsuccessfully petitioned for annulment (February 2006). Divorced (December 2006).	
Charlie Sheen and Donna Peele	5 months	September 1995 – 1996		
Michael Kopech and Vanessa Morgan	157 days	January 4 – June 19, 2020		
Drew Barrymore and Tom Green	163 days	July 7 – December 17, 2001		
Shannen Doherty and Ashley Hamilton	> 6 months	1993 – March 1994		
R. Kelly and Aaliyah	6 months	August 1994 – February 1995	Marriage annulled by Aaliyah's parents.	
Carmen Electra and Dennis Rodman	6 months	November 14, 1998 – April 1999	Rodman filed for an annulment 9 days later but they reconciled before mutually agreeing to divorce 6 months later.	
Connie Francis and Bob Parkinson	< 7 months	June – unknown end, 1985	Francis's fourth and final marriage.	
Kim Darby and James Stacy	7 months	1968–1969		
Harlan Ellison and Lori Horowitz	8 months	1976–1977	Ellison's fourth of five marriages. His fifth marriage would last 32 years until his death.	
Liam Hemsworth and Miley Cyrus	8 months	December 2018 - August 2019		
Carly Pearce and Michael Ray	8 1/2 months	October 6, 2019 – June 19, 2020		
Rick Salomon and Shannen Doherty	9 months	2002–2003		
Elizabeth Taylor and Conrad Hilton Jr.	205 days	May 6 – November 27, 1950		
Jennifer Lopez and Cris Judd	218 days	September 2001 – June 2002		
Jim Carrey and Lauren Holly	10 months	September 1996 – July 1997		
Woody Harrelson and Nancy Simon	10 months	1985–1986	Married in Tijuana with the intent of getting a Mexican divorce afterward. The divorce did not occur until ten months later as the "divorce stand" was closed.	
Connie Francis and Izzy Marion	10 months	January – November 1971	Francis's second of four marriages.	
Rick Salomon and Pamela Anderson	10 weeks 1 year	2007–2008, 2014–2015	Married and remarried	
Desi Arnaz Jr. and Linda Purl	< 1 year	1979 – January 3, 1980		
Connie Francis and Dick Kanellis	< 1 year	1964	Francis's first of four marriages, undertaken after Francis was unable to get her father's blessing to marry her first choice Bobby Darin.	
James Caan and Sheila Marie Ryan	> 1 year	1976–1977	Son: Scott Caan	
Angela Lansbury and Richard Cromwell	> 1 year	September 27, 1945 – September 1946	Her second marriage would last 53 years.	
Lana Wood and Jack Wrather III	> 1 year	1962–1963	Annulled, as Wood was under the age of consent at the time of the marriage. Wrather III was the son of Jack Wrather Jr.	
Lana Wood and Stephen Oliver	<1 year	1966	Annulled	
Lana Wood and Stanley Vogel	<1 year	1968		
Kelsey Grammer and Leigh-Anne Csuhany	1 year	September 1992 – 1993		
Lorenzo Lamas and Victoria Hilbert	1 year	1981–1982	His second marriage, to Michele Smith, did not last two years but did lead to children.	
Martin Scorsese and Julia Cameron	1 year	1976–1977		
Robert Evans and Phyllis George	1 year	1977–1978	Evans's fourth of seven marriages	
Robert Evans and Victoria White	1 year	2005–2006	Evans's seventh and final marriage	
Mickey Rooney and Ava Gardner	1 year+	1942–1943		
Gloria Swanson and Wallace Beery	1 year	March 27, 1916–1917	Swanson, age 17 at the time, was an unwilling party to the marriage but was unable to have it annulled. Due to California laws, the divorce would not be finalized until December 1918. It was the first of Swanson's six marriages.	
Gloria Swanson and William M. Davey	1 year	January 25, 1945–1946	Swanson's fourth of six marriages, made solely for financial reasons. The two were in the midst of divorce proceedings when Davey died.	
Richard Mulligan and Rachel Ryan	<1 year	April 27, 1992 – "early 1993"	Mulligan's fourth and final marriage	

== Entertainers married 50 years or more, active ==
Entertainment couples whose relationships last for decades, and/or life, are occasionally used as a counterpoint when referring to "Hollywood marriage". Listed are a selection of entertainers who have or had marriages that lasted over 50 years.

(Note that in a few of these cases, the entertainers were not necessarily in monogamous marriages. Tom Jones, for example, had many extramarital affairs throughout his marriage.)

Couple	Duration	Dates	Source
William Daniels and Bonnie Bartlett	75 years, 143 days	June 30, 1951 – present	
Arlene Weiss and Alan Alda	69 years, 250 days	March 15, 1957 – present	
Gary Conway and Marian McKnight	67 years, 334 days	December 21, 1958 – present	
Richard Benjamin and Paula Prentiss	65 years, 25 days	October 26, 1961 – present	
Martin Sheen and Janet Templeton	64 years, 332 days	December 23, 1961 – present	
Anthony Zerbe and Arnette Jens	64 years, 44 days	October 7, 1962 – present	
Lee Grant and Joseph Feury	63 years+	1962 – present	
Jamie Farr and Joy Ann Richards	63 years, 277 days	February 16, 1963 – present	
Dion DiMucci and Susan Butterfield	63 years, 240 days	March 25, 1963 – present	
Brenda Lee and Ronnie Shacklett	63 years, 210 days	April 24, 1963 – present	
Pete Best and Kathy Best	62 years+	1963 – present	
Bill Cosby and Camille Hanks Cosby	62 years, 299 days	January 25, 1964 – present	
Chubby Checker and Catharina Lodders	62 years, 222 days	April 12, 1964 – present	
Vince McMahon and Linda Edwards	60 years, 86 days	August 26, 1966 – present	
Steve Smith and Morag Smith	59 years+	1966 – present	
John Paul Jones and Maureen Hegarty	58 years+	1967 – present	
Scott Glenn and Carol Schwartz	58 years, 71 days	September 10, 1968 – present	
Julian Glover and Isla Blair	58 years, 53 days	September 28, 1968 – present	
Christopher Walken and Georgianne Walken	57 years+	January 1969 – present	
Héctor Elizondo and Carolee Campbell	57 years, 221 days	April 13, 1969 – present	
Billy Davis Jr. and Marilyn McCoo	57 years, 117 days	July 26, 1969 – present	
Richard Jenkins and Sharon R. Friedrick	57 years, 89 days	August 23, 1969 – present	
Robert Pine and Gwynne Gilford	57 years, 75 days	September 6, 1969 – present	
Bruce Dern and Andrea Beckett	57 years, 31 days	October 20, 1969 – present	
Billy Crystal and Janice Goldfinger	56 years, 169 days	June 4, 1970 – present	
Barry Gibb and Linda Gray	56 years, 80 days	September 1, 1970 – present	
Alan Bleasdale and Julia Moses	55 years, 327 days	December 28, 1970 – present	
Stephen King and Tabitha Spruce	55 years, 322 days	January 2, 1971 – present	
Barbara Anderson and Don Burnett	55 years, 158 days	June 15, 1971 – present	
Roger Daltrey and Heather Taylor	55 years, 124 days	July 19, 1971 – present	
Billy Dee Williams and Teruko Nakagami	53 years, 328 days	December 27, 1972 – present	
Michael Caine and Shakira Baksh	53 years, 316 days	January 8, 1973 – present	
Jill Eikenberry and Michael Tucker	53 years, 155 days	June 18, 1973 – present	
Sissy Spacek and Jack Fisk	52 years, 222 days	April 12, 1974 – present	
Ron Howard and Cheryl Alley	51 years, 166 days	June 7, 1975 – present	
John Larroquette and Elizabeth Cookson	51 years, 139 days	July 4, 1975 – present	
Joe Mantegna and Arlene Vrhel	51 years, 48 days	October 3, 1975 – present	
Sam Waterston and Lynn Louisa Woodruff	50 years, 298 days	January 26, 1976 – present	
Alice Cooper and Sheryl Cooper	50 years, 245 days	March 20, 1976 – present	
Timothy Carlton and Wanda Ventham	50 years+	April 1976 – present	
David Suchet and Sheila Ferris	50 years, 143 days	June 30, 1976 – present	

== Entertainers married 50 years or more, inactive ==
Couple	Duration	Dates	Source
Irving Benson and Lillian Waldowsky	79 years, 105 days	November 19, 1936 – March 3, 2016 (her death)	
Peggy Craven and Norman Lloyd	75 years, 65 days	June 29, 1936 – August 30, 2011 (her death)	
Art Linkletter and Lois Linkletter	74 years, 172 days	November 25, 1935 – May 16, 2010 (his death)	
Johnnie Wright and Kitty Wells	73 years, 332 days	October 30, 1937 – September 27, 2011 (his death)	
Charles Lane and Ruth Covell Lane	71 years, 233 days	April 12, 1931 – November 30, 2002 (her death)	
Karl Malden and Mona Greenberg	70 years, 195 days	December 18, 1938 – July 1, 2009 (his death)	
Inga Swenson and Lowell Harris	70 years, 152 days	February 21, 1953 – July 23, 2023 (her death)	
Joan Evans and Kirby Weatherly	70 years, 137 days	August 15, 1952 – January 1, 2023 (his death)	
Pete Seeger and Toshi Aline Ohta	69 years, 354 days	July 20, 1943 – July 9, 2013 (her death)	
Monty Hall and Marilyn Doreen Plottel	69 years, 260 days	September 28, 1947 – June 5, 2017 (her death)	
Richard Attenborough and Sheila Sim	69 years, 214 days	January 22, 1945 – August 24, 2014 (his death)	
Stan Lee and Joan Boocock	69 years, 214 days	December 5, 1947 – July 6, 2017 (her death)	
Nehemiah Persoff and Thia Persoff	69 years, 163 days	August 22, 1951 – February 1, 2021 (her death)	
Bob Hope and Dolores Reade	69 years, 158 days	February 19, 1934 – July 27, 2003 (his death)	
Chuck Berry and Thelmetta "Toddy" Suggs	68 years, 141 days	October 28, 1948 – March 18, 2017 (his death)	
Frank Cady and Shirley Katherine Jones	68 years, 68 days	June 15, 1940 – August 22, 2008 (her death)	
Slim Whitman and Alma Crist Whitman	67 years, 233 days	June 28, 1941 – February 16, 2009 (her death)	
Iris Apfel and Carl Apfel	67 years, 161 days	February 22, 1948 – August 1, 2015 (his death)	
Mike Connors and Mary Lou Willey	67 years, 138 days	September 10, 1949 – January 26, 2017 (his death)	
William Schallert and Rosemarie D. "Lia" Waggner	66 years, 190 days	February 26, 1949 – September 3, 2015 (her death)	
Bob Hastings and Joan Rice-Hastings	66 years, 156 days	January 25, 1948 – June 30, 2014 (his death)	
Eli Wallach and Anne Jackson	66 years, 111 days	March 5, 1948 – June 24, 2014 (his death)	
John Weld and Gigi Parrish	66 years+	1937 – June 14, 2003 (his death)	
Kirk Douglas and Anne Buydens	65 years, 253 days	May 29, 1954 – February 5, 2020 (his death)	
Pat Boone and Shirley Foley	65 years, 66 days	November 7, 1953 – January 11, 2019 (her death)	
Eva Marie Saint and Jeffrey Hayden	65 years, 57 days	October 28, 1951 – December 24, 2016 (his death)	
Jane Wyatt and Edgar Bethune Ward	64 years, 364 days	November 9, 1935 – November 8, 2000 (his death)	
Walter Cronkite and Betsy Cronkite	64 years, 350 days	March 30, 1940 – March 15, 2005 (her death)	
Danny Aiello and Sandy Cohen	64 years, 329 days	January 8, 1955 – December 13, 2019 (his death)	
Mary Carlisle and James Blakely	64 years, 323 days	March 14, 1942 – January 30, 2007 (his death)	
Estelle Lebost and Carl Reiner	64 years, 306 days	December 24, 1943 – October 25, 2008 (her death)	
Charlie Brill and Mitzi McCall	64 years, 196 days	January 25, 1960 – August 8, 2024 (her death)	
Lydia Clarke and Charlton Heston	64 years, 19 days	March 17, 1944 – April 5, 2008 (his death)	
Philip Rose and Doris Belack	64 years+	1946 – May 31, 2011 (his death)	
James Cagney and Frances Willard Vernon	63 years, 181 days	September 28, 1922 – March 30, 1986 (his death)	
Conrad Bain and Monica Sloan	63 years, 176 days	September 4, 1945 – February 26, 2009 (her death)	
Neil Sedaka and Leba Strassberg	63 years, 169 days	September 11, 1962 – February 27, 2026 (his death)	
Ed Nelson and Patricia Miller Nelson	63 years, 62 days	June 9, 1951 – August 9, 2014 (his death)	
Karl Brown and Edna Mae Cooper	63 years+	1922 – June 27, 1986 (her death)	
Irving Berlin and Ellin Mackay	62 years, 208 days	January 4, 1926 – July 29, 1988 (her death)	
Lorraine Gary and Sid Sheinberg	62 years, 200 days	August 19, 1956 – March 7, 2019 (his death)	
George Gaynes and Allyn Ann McLerie	62 years, 57 days	December 20, 1953 – February 15, 2016 (his death)	
Alec Guinness and Merula Salaman	62 years, 46 days	June 20, 1938 – August 5, 2000 (his death)	
Philip Bosco and Nancy Ann Dunkle	61 years, 335 days	January 2, 1957 – December 3, 2018 (his death)	
James B. Sikking and Florine Caplan	61 years, 315 days	September 1, 1962 – July 13, 2024 (his death)	
Don Murray and Bettie Johnson	61 years, 180 days	August 6, 1962 – February, 2, 2024 (his death)	
Paul Mazursky and Betsy Mazursky	61 years, 110 days	March 12, 1953 – June 30, 2014 (his death)	
Eleanor Neil and Francis Ford Coppola	61 years, 70 days	February 2, 1963 – April 12, 2024 (her death)	
Mark Margolis and Jacqueline Margolis	61 years, 64 days	June 3, 1962 – August 3, 2023 (his death)	
Dick Van Patten and Patricia Poole	61 years, 59 days	April 25, 1954 – June 23, 2015 (his death)	
Robert Young and Betty Henderson	61 years, 29 days	March 6, 1933 – April 4, 1994 (her death)	
Jerry Stiller and Anne Meara	60 years, 251 days	September 14, 1954 – May 23, 2015 (her death)	
F. Murray Abraham and Kate Hannan	60 years, 226 days	April 7, 1962 – November 19, 2022 (her death)	
Kristine Miller and William Schuyler	60 years, 136 days	July 27, 1953 – December 10, 2013 (his death)	
Jonathan Winters and Eileen Winters	60 years, 122 days	September 11, 1948 – January 11, 2009 (her death)	
Bob Newhart and Virginia Quinn	60 years, 101 days	January 12, 1963 – April 23, 2023 (her death)	
Alvino Rey and Luise King	60 years, 76 days	May 21, 1937 – August 4, 1997 (her death)	
Cyd Charisse and Tony Martin	60 years, 34 days	May 15, 1948 – June 17, 2008 (her death)	
Harold Gould and Lea Shampanier-Vernon	60 years, 22 days	August 20, 1950 – September 11, 2010 (his death)	
Alan R. Pearlman and Buena Alcalay	60 years+	1958 – January 6, 2019 (his death)	
Lloyd Bridges and Dorothy Dean	59 years, 147 days	October 15, 1938 – March 10, 1998 (his death)	
Geoffrey Holder and Carmen de Lavallade	59 years, 102 days	June 26, 1955 – October 5, 2014 (his death)	
Adolph Zukor and Lottie Kaufman	59 years, 89 days	January 10, 1897 – April 7, 1956 (her death)	
Peter Graves and Joan Endress	59 years, 88 days	December 16, 1950 – March 14, 2010 (his death)	
Tom Jones and Melinda Trenchard	59 years, 39 days	March 2, 1957 – April 10, 2016 (her death)	
William Christopher and Barbara O'Connor	59 years+	1957 – December 31, 2016 (his death)	
Larry Hagman and Maj Axelsson	58 years, 341 days	December 18, 1954 – November 23, 2012 (his death)	
Tom Troupe and Carole Cook	58 years, 310 days	March 7, 1964 – January 11, 2023 (her death)	
Dolly Parton and Carl Dean	58 years, 277 days	May 30, 1966 – March 3, 2025 (his death)	
Martin Milner and Judith Bess Jones	58 years, 195 days	February 23, 1958 – September 6, 2015 (his death)	
James Garner and Lois Clarke	57 years, 336 days	August 17, 1956 – July 19, 2014 (his death)	
Margia Dean and Felipe Alvarez	57 years, 299 days	August 29, 1965 – June 23, 2023 (her death)	
Patrick McGoohan and Joan Drummond	57 years, 239 days	May 19, 1951 – January 13, 2009 (his death)	
Joe E. Brown and Kathryn McGraw	57 years, 195 days	December 24, 1915 – July 6, 1973 (his death)	
Ray Bolger and Gwendolyn Rickard	57 years, 191 days	July 9, 1929 – January 15, 1987 (his death)	
Walter Koenig and Judy Levitt	57 years, 151 days	July 11, 1965 – December 9, 2022 (her death)	
Robert Mitchum and Dorothy Spence	57 years, 107 days	March 16, 1940 – July 1, 1997 (his death)	
Ron Rifkin and Iva Rifkin	57 years, 98 days	August 28, 1966 – December 4, 2023 (her death)	
Ray Walston and Ruth Calvert	57 years, 59 days	November 3, 1943 - January 1, 2001 (his death)	
Ossie Davis and Ruby Dee	57 years, 57 days	December 9, 1948 – February 4, 2005 (his death)	
David Prowse and Norma E. Scammell	57 years, 54 days	October 5, 1963 – November 28, 2020 (his death)	
Laurence Irving and Rosalind Frances Woolner	57 years+	1920 – December 14, 1978 (her death)	
Joel McCrea and Frances Dee	57 years, 0 days	October 20, 1933 – October 20, 1990 (his death)	
Charlie Watts and Shirley Ann Shepherd	56 years, 315 days	October 14, 1964 – August 24, 2021 (his death)	
Engelbert Humperdinck and Patricia Healey	56 years, 307 days	April 18, 1964 – February 18, 2021 (her death)	
Estelle Getty and Arthur Gettleman	56 years, 263 days	December 21, 1947 – September 10, 2004 (his death)	
Cecil B. DeMille and Constance Adams	56 years, 158 days	August 16, 1902 – January 21, 1959 (his death)	
René Auberjonois and Judith Mihalyi	56 years, 51 days	October 19, 1963 – December 8, 2019 (his death)	
Darryl F. Zanuck and Virginia Fox	55 years, 333 days	January 24, 1924 – December 22, 1979 (his death)	
Andrew Robinson and Irene Robinson	55 years, 322 days	March 9, 1970 – January 25, 2026 (her death)	
Steve Lawrence and Eydie Gormé	55 years, 224 days	December 29, 1957 – August 10, 2013 (her death)	
Shane Rimmer and Sheila Logan	55 years, 189 days	September 21, 1963 – March 29, 2019 (his death)	
John McIntire and Jeanette Nolan	55 years, 158 days	August 26, 1935 – January 30, 1991 (his death)	
Lupita Tovar and Paul Kohner	55 years, 138 days	October 31, 1932 – March 16, 1988 (his death)	
Mary Kay Jones and Johnny Stearns	55 years, 113 days	August 11, 1946 – December 1, 2001 (his death)	
Olympia Dukakis and Louis Zorich	55 years, 61 days	November 30, 1962 – January 30, 2018 (his death)	
Jackie Cooper and Barbara Rae Kraus	55 years, 32 days	April 29, 1954 – May 30, 2009 (her death)	
Danny Thomas and Rose Marie Cassaniti	55 years, 22 days	January 15, 1936 – February 6, 1991 (his death)	
Richard Widmark and Ora Hazlewood	54 years, 332 days	April 5, 1942 – March 2, 1997 (her death)	
Shirley Temple and Charles Alden Black	54 years, 232 days	December 16, 1950 – August 4, 2005 (his death)	
Yakima Canutt and Minnie Audrea Yeager	54 years, 194 days	November 12, 1931 – May 24, 1986 (his death)	
Anne Jeffreys and Robert Sterling	54 years, 190 days	November 21, 1951 – May 30, 2006 (his death)	
Leotta Wotton and Grant Whytock	54 years, 135 days	June 1, 1918 – October 13, 1972 (her death)	
Alice Faye and Phil Harris	54 years, 3 months	May 1941 – August 11, 1995 (his death)	
Christopher Lee and Birgit Krøncke	54 years, 82 days	March 17, 1961 – June 7, 2015 (his death)	
Frances Chaney and Ring Lardner Jr.	54 years, 34 days	September 28, 1946 – October 31, 2000 (his death)	
Tony Randall and Florence Gibbs	54 years+	1938 – April 18, 1992 (her death)	
Walter Brennan and Ruth Wells	53 years, 340 days	October 17, 1920 – September 21, 1974 (his death)	
Ann Blyth and Dr. James Vincent McNulty	53 years, 320 days	June 27, 1953 – May 13, 2007 (his death)	
Don Ameche and Honore Prendergast	53 years, 283 days	November 26, 1932 - September 5, 1986 (her death)	
DeForest Kelley and Carolyn Dowling	53 years, 277 days	September 7, 1945 - June 11, 1999 (his death)	
Angela Lansbury and Peter Shaw	53 years, 170 days	August 12, 1949 – January 29, 2003 (his death)	
Ray Milland and Muriel Weber	53 years, 162 days	September 30, 1932 – March 10, 1986 (his death)	
Alfred Hitchcock and Alma Reville	53 years, 149 days	December 2, 1926 – April 29, 1980 (his death)	
Roger Corman and Julie Corman	53 years, 138 days	December 23, 1970 – May 9, 2024 (his death)	
Garry Marshall and Barbara Sue Wells	53 years, 132 days	March 9, 1963 – July 19, 2016 (his death)	
Marlene Dietrich and Rudolf Sieber	53 years, 39 days	May 17, 1923 – June 24, 1976 (his death)	
Dana Andrews and Mary Todd	53 years, 31 days	November 17, 1939 – December 17, 1992 (his death)	
Burt Mustin and Frances Woods	53 years+	1915 – August 18, 1969 (her death)	
Cara Williams and Asher Dann	53 years+	1964 – March 18, 2018 (his death)	
Henry Hathaway and Blanche Gonzalez	52 years, 337 days	March 12, 1932 – February 11, 1985 (his death)	
Billy Wilder and Audrey Young	52 years, 271 days	June 30, 1949 – March 27, 2002 (his death)	
Susan Lucci and Helmut Huber	52 years, 196 days	September 13, 1969 – March 28, 2022 (his death)	
Frank Capra and Lucille Warner	52 years, 152 days	February 1, 1932 – July 1, 1984 (her death)	
Nancy Davis and Ronald Reagan	52 years, 93 days	March 4, 1952 – June 5, 2004 (his death)	
Hal Linden and Frances Martin	52 years, 87 days	April 13, 1958 – July 9, 2010 (her death)	
Don Rickles and Barbara Sklar	52 years, 23 days	March 14, 1965 – April 6, 2017 (his death)	
Mitzi Gaynor and Jack Bean	52 years, 16 days	November 18, 1954 – December 4, 2006 (his death)	
Joseph Bologna and Renée Taylor	52 years, 2 days	August 11, 1965 – August 13, 2017 (his death)	
Hume Cronyn and Jessica Tandy	52 years+	1942 – September 11, 1994 (her death)	
John Howard Lawson and Susan Edmond Lawson	52 years+	1925 – August 11, 1977 (his death)	
Martha Scott and Mel Powell	51 years, 276 days	July 23, 1946 – April 24, 1998 (his death)	
Norman Jewison and Margaret Ann Dixon	51 years, 139 days	July 11, 1953 – November 26, 2004 (her death)	
Alexander Knox and Doris Nolan	51 years, 117 days	December 30, 1944 – April 25, 1995 (his death)	
Louise Lovely and Albert Bertie Cowen	51 years, 113 days	November 26, 1928 – March 17, 1980 (her death)	
Betty Brodel and Joe Franzalia	51 years, 35 days	May 24, 1948 – June 27, 1999 (his death)	
Jean Speegle Howard and Rance Howard	51 years+	1949 – September 2, 2000 (her death)	
Mary Lou Metzger and Richard Maloof	50 years, 320 days	June 16, 1973 – May 1, 2024 (his death)	
Joanne Woodward and Paul Newman	50 years, 241 days	January 29, 1958 – September 26, 2008 (his death)	
John Forsythe and Julie Warren	50 years, 240 days	December 18, 1943 – August 15, 1994 (her death)	
Grace Stafford and Walter Lantz	50 years, 201 days	August 29, 1941 – March 17, 1992 (her death)	
Clu Gulager and Miriam Byrd-Nethery	50 years, 199 days	June 21, 1952 – January 6, 2003 (her death)	
Rosemary Harris and John Ehle	50 years, 154 days	October 21, 1967 – March 24, 2018 (his death)	
Joy Philbin and Regis Philbin	50 years, 146 days	March 1, 1970 – July 25, 2020 (his death)	
Christopher Plummer and Elaine Taylor	50 years, 126 days	October 2, 1970 – February 5, 2021 (his death)	
Agnes de Mille and Walter Prude	50 years, 116 days	June 14, 1943 – October 7, 1993 (her death)	
Ann-Margret and Roger Smith	50 years, 27 days	May 8, 1967 – June 4, 2017 (his death)	
Joan Leslie and William Caldwell	50 years, 20 days	March 17, 1950 – April 5, 2000 (his death)	
Wayne Osmond and Kathlyn White	50 years, 18 days	December 13, 1974 – January 1, 2025 (his death)	
Federico Fellini and Giulietta Masina	50 years, 1 day	October 30, 1943 – October 31, 1993 (his death)	
Ben E. King and Betty Davis	50 years+	1964 – April 30, 2015 (his death)	
Lee Phillip and William J. Bell	50 years+	1954 – April 29, 2005 (his death)	
