= One Flew Over the Cuckoo's Nest (novel) =

1962 novel by Ken Kesey

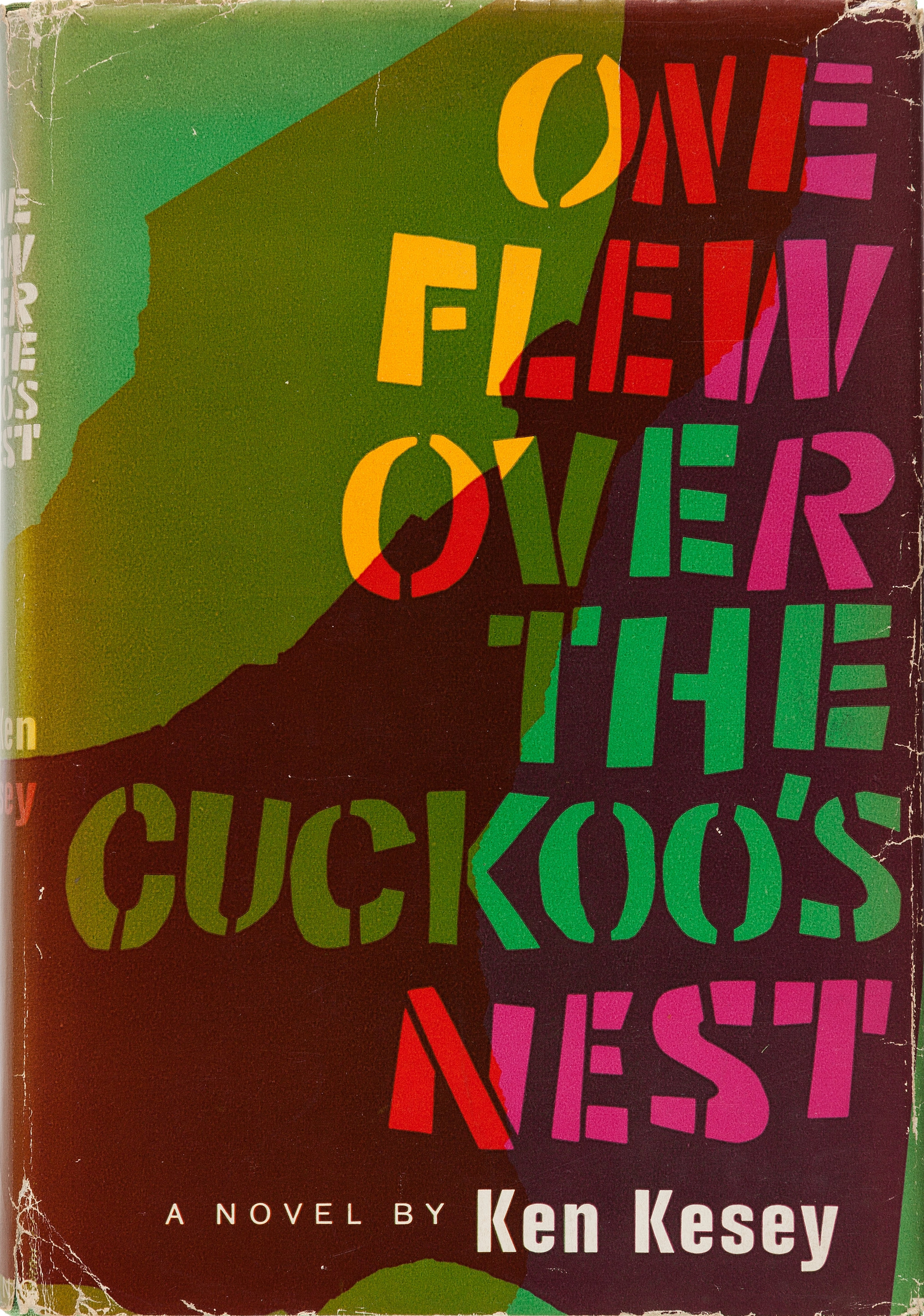
- First edition
- Author: Ken Kesey
- Cover artist: Paul Bacon
- Language: English
- Genre: Tragedy
- Publisher: Viking Press & Signet Books
- Publication date: February 1, 1962
- Publication place: United States
- Pages: 320
- OCLC: 37505041

One Flew Over the Cuckoo's Nest is a novel by Ken Kesey published in 1962. Set in an Oregon psychiatric hospital, the narrative serves as a study of institutional processes and the human mind, including a critique of psychiatry and a tribute to individualistic principles. It was adapted into the Broadway (and later off-Broadway) play One Flew Over the Cuckoo's Nest by Dale Wasserman in 1963. Bo Goldman adapted the novel into a 1975 film of the same name directed by Miloš Forman, which won five Academy Awards.

Time magazine included the novel in its "100 Best English-language Novels from 1923 to 2005" list. In 2003 the book was listed on the BBC's The Big Read poll of the UK's 200 "best-loved novels."

== Plot ==
The book is narrated by Chief Bromden, a gigantic half-Native American patient at a psychiatric hospital, who presents himself as deaf, mute, and docile. Bromden's tale focuses mainly on the antics of the rebellious Randle Patrick McMurphy, who faked insanity to serve his sentence for battery and gambling in the hospital rather than at a prison work farm. The head administrative nurse, Nurse Ratched, rules the ward with absolute authority and little medical oversight. She is assisted by her three day-shift orderlies and her assistant nurses.

McMurphy constantly antagonizes Nurse Ratched and upsets the routines of the ward, leading to endless power struggles between the inmate and the nurse. He runs a card table, captains the ward's basketball team, comments on Nurse Ratched's figure, incites the other patients to conduct a vote about watching the World Series on television, and organizes a deep-sea fishing trip wherein the patients were going to be "supervised" by his prostitute friends. After claiming to be able, and subsequently failing, to lift a heavy control panel in the defunct hydrotherapy room (referred to as the "tub room"), his response—"But at least I tried"—gives the men incentive to try to stand up for themselves, instead of allowing Nurse Ratched to take control of every aspect of their lives. The Chief opens up to McMurphy, revealing late one night that he can speak and hear. A violent disturbance after the fishing trip results in McMurphy and the Chief being sent for electroshock therapy sessions, but such punishment does nothing to curb McMurphy's rambunctious behavior.

One night, after bribing the night orderly, McMurphy smuggles two prostitute girlfriends with liquor onto the ward and breaks into the pharmacy for codeine cough syrup and unnamed psychiatric medications. McMurphy, having noticed on the fishing trip that Billy Bibbit, a timid, boyish patient with a stutter and little experience with women, had a crush on the prostitute named Candy, primarily arranged this break-in so that Billy could lose his virginity and, to a slightly lesser extent, so that McMurphy and other patients could throw an unsanctioned party. Although McMurphy agrees before the end of the night to a plan involving his escaping before the morning shift starts, he and the other patients instead fall asleep without cleaning up the mess of the group's antics, and the morning staff discover the ward in complete disarray. Nurse Ratched finds Billy and the prostitute in each other's arms, partially dressed, and admonishes him. Billy asserts himself for the first time, answering Nurse Ratched without stuttering. Ratched calmly threatens to tell Billy's mother what she has seen. Billy has an emotional breakdown, regressing immediately back to a boyish state, and, upon being left alone in the doctor's office, takes his life by cutting his throat. Ratched blames McMurphy for the loss of Billy's life. Enraged at what she has done to Billy, McMurphy attacks Ratched by ripping her shirt open and attempting to strangle her to death. McMurphy is physically restrained and moved to the Disturbed ward.

Ratched misses a week of work due to her injuries, during which time many of the patients either transfer to other wards or check out of the hospital forever. When she returns, she cannot speak and is thus deprived of her most potent tool to keep the men in line. With Bromden, Martini and Scanlon the only patients who attended the boat trip left on the ward, McMurphy is brought back in. He has received a lobotomy, and is now in a vegetative state, rendering him silent and motionless. During the night The Chief smothers McMurphy with a pillow in an act of mercy then lifts the tub room control panel that McMurphy could not lift earlier, throwing it through a window and escaping the hospital.

== Background ==
Kesey started writing One Flew Over the Cuckoo's Nest in 1959, and it was published in 1962 in the midst of the Civil Rights Movement and deep changes to the way psychology and psychiatry were being approached in America. The 1960s began the movement towards deinstitutionalization, an act that would have affected the characters in Kesey's novel. The novel is a direct product of Kesey's time working the graveyard shift as an orderly at a mental health facility in Menlo Park, California. Not only did he speak to the patients and witness the workings of the institution, he also voluntarily took psychoactive drugs, including mescaline and LSD, as part of Project MKUltra. In addition to his work with Project MKUltra, Kesey took LSD recreationally; advocating for drug use as a path to individual freedom.

The novel constantly refers to different authorities that control individuals through subtle and coercive methods. The novel's narrator, the Chief, combines these authorities in his mind, calling them "The Combine" in reference to the mechanistic way they manipulate and process individuals. The authority of The Combine is most often personified in the character of Nurse Ratched who controls the inhabitants of the novel's mental ward through a combination of rewards and subtle shame. Although she does not normally resort to conventionally harsh discipline, her actions are portrayed as more insidious than those of a conventional prison administrator. This is because the subtlety of her actions prevents her prisoners from understanding they are being controlled at all. The Chief also sees the Combine in the damming of the wild Columbia River at Celilo Falls, where his Native American ancestors hunted, and in the broader conformity of post-war American consumer society. The novel's critique of the mental ward as an instrument of oppression comparable to the prison mirrored many of the claims that French intellectual Michel Foucault was making at the same time. Similarly, Foucault argued that invisible forms of discipline oppressed individuals on a broad societal scale, encouraging them to censor aspects of themselves and their actions. The novel also criticizes the emasculation of men in society, particularly in the character of Billy Bibbit, the stuttering patient who is dominated by both Nurse Ratched and his mother.

== Title ==
The title of the book is a line from a nursery rhyme:

Vintery, mintery, cutery, corn,
Apple seed and apple thorn,
Wire, briar, limber lock
Three geese in a flock
One flew East
One flew West
And one flew over the cuckoo's nest

Chief Bromden's grandmother sang a version of this song to him when he was a child, a fact revealed in the story when the Chief received yet another ECT treatment after he assisted McMurphy with defending George, a patient being abused by the ward's aides.

== Main characters ==
- Randle McMurphy: A free-spirited, rebellious con man, sent to the hospital from a prison work farm. He is guilty of battery and gambling. He had also been charged with statutory rape, though never convicted as the fifteen-year-old girl chose not to testify so as not to implicate herself. McMurphy is transferred from a prison work farm to the hospital, thinking it will be an easy way to serve out his sentence in comfort. In the end, McMurphy attacks Nurse Ratched, inadvertently sacrificing his freedom and his health in exchange for freeing the previously shackled spirits of the cowed patients on the ward.
- Chief Bromden: The novel's half-Native American narrator has been in the mental hospital since the end of World War II. Bromden is presumed by staff and patients alike to be deaf and mute, and through this guise he becomes privy to many of the ward's dirtiest secrets. As a young man, the Chief was a high school football star, a college student, and a war hero. After seeing his father, a Native American chieftain, humiliated at the hands of the U.S. government and his white wife, Chief Bromden descends into clinical depression and begins hallucinating. Soon he is diagnosed with schizophrenia. He believes society is controlled by a large, mechanized system which he calls "The Combine."

=== Staff ===
- Nurse Ratched (also known as "Big Nurse"): The tyrannical head nurse of the mental institution, who exercises near-total control over those in her care, including her subordinates. She will not hesitate to restrict her patients' access to medication, amenities, and basic human necessities if it suits her manipulative whims. Her favorite informant is the timid Billy Bibbit, whom she coerces into divulging the unit's secrets by threatening to complain about him to his mother. McMurphy's fun-loving, rebellious presence in Ratched's institution is a constant annoyance, as neither threats nor punishment nor shock therapy will stop him or the patients under his sway. Eventually, after McMurphy nearly chokes her to death in a fit of rage, Nurse Ratched has him lobotomized. However, the damage has already been done, and McMurphy's attack leaves her nearly unable to speak, which renders her unable to intimidate her patients, subordinates and superiors.
- Warren, Washington, and Williams: Three black men who work as aides in the ward during the day. Williams is a dwarf; according to Chief, he saw his mother being raped when he was five years old and stopped growing at that point.
- Geever: the swing shift aide.
- Dr. John Spivey: The ward doctor. Nurse Ratched drove off other doctors, but she kept Spivey because he always did as he was told. Harding suggests that the nurse could threaten to expose him as a drug addict if he stood up to her. McMurphy's rebellion inspires him to stand up to Nurse Ratched.
- Nurse Pilbow: The young night nurse whose face, neck, and chest are stained with a profound birthmark. A devout Catholic who fears sinning, she blames the patients for infecting her with their evil and takes it out on them.
- Mr. Turkle: An elderly African American aide who works the late shift in the ward. He agrees to let McMurphy host a party and sneak in prostitutes one night.
- The Japanese Nurse: The nurse in charge of the upstairs disturbed ward, for violent and unmanageable patients. She is kind and openly opposes Nurse Ratched's methods.

=== Acutes ===
The acutes are patients who officials believe can still be cured. With few exceptions, they are there voluntarily, a fact that angers McMurphy when he first learns of it, then later causes him to feel further pity for the patients, thus further inspiring him to prove to them they can still be strong despite their seeming willingness to be weak.

- Billy Bibbit: A nervous, shy, and boyish patient with an extreme speech impediment, Billy cuts and burns himself, and has attempted suicide numerous times. Billy has a fear of women, especially those with authority such as his mother. To alleviate this, McMurphy sneaks a prostitute into the ward so Billy can lose his virginity. The next morning, Nurse Ratched threatens to tell his mother; fearing the loss of his mother's love, Billy has an emotional breakdown and commits suicide by cutting his throat.
- Dale Harding: The unofficial leader of the patients before McMurphy arrives, he is an intelligent, good-looking man who is ashamed of his repressed homosexuality. Harding's beautiful yet malcontent wife is a source of shame for him.
- George Sorensen: A man with germaphobia, he spends his days washing his hands in the ward's drinking fountain. McMurphy manages to persuade him to lead a fishing expedition for the patients after discovering he had once captained a fishing boat. Afterward, the three aides, Warren, Washington, and Williams maliciously forcibly delouse him, cruelly knowing the mental anguish this will cause him.
- Charlie Cheswick: A loud-mouthed patient who always demands changes in the ward, but never has the courage to see anything through. He finds a friend in McMurphy, who is able to voice his opinions for him. At one point McMurphy decides to fall in line when he learns his stay in the ward is indefinite and his release is solely determined by the Big Nurse. As a result, Cheswick drowns himself in the hospital's swimming pool when he decides he himself will never escape the relentless Big Nurse.
- Martini: A patient who has severe hallucinations.
- Scanlon: A patient obsessed with explosives and destruction. He is the only acute patient confined to the ward by force aside from McMurphy; the rest can leave at any time.
- Jim Sefelt and Bruce Fredrickson: Two epileptic patients. Sefelt refuses to take his anti-seizure medication, as it makes his teeth fall out and as such makes him self-conscious over his appearance. Fredrickson takes Sefelt's medication as well as his own because he is terrified of the seizures, and loses teeth due to the resulting overdosage.
- Max Taber: An unruly patient who was released before McMurphy arrived. The Chief later describes how, after he questioned what was in his medication, Nurse Ratched had him "fixed."

=== Chronics ===
The chronics are patients who will never be cured. Many of the chronics are elderly and/or in vegetative states.

- Ruckly: A hell-raising patient who challenged the rules until the Big Nurse authorized his lobotomy. After the lobotomy, he sits and stares at a picture of his wife, and occasionally screams profanities.
- Ellis: Ellis was put in a vegetative state by electroshock therapy. He stands against the wall in a disturbing messianic position with arms outstretched.
- Pete Bancini: Bancini had brain damage at birth but managed to hold down simple jobs, such as a switch operator on a lightly used railroad branch line, until the switches were automated and he lost his job, after which he was institutionalized. The Chief remembers how once, and only once, he lashed out violently against the aides, telling the other patients that he was a living miscarriage, born dead.
- Rawler: A patient on the Disturbed ward, above the main ward, who says nothing but "loo, loo, loo!" all day and tries to run up the walls. One night, Rawler castrates himself while sitting on the toilet and bleeds to death before anyone realizes what he has done.
- Old Blastic: An old patient who is in a vegetative state. The first night McMurphy is in the ward, Bromden dreams Blastic is hung by his heel and sliced open, spilling his rusty visceral matter. The next morning, Bromden learns Blastic died during the night.
- The Lifeguard: An ex-professional football player, he still has the cleat marks on his forehead from the injury that scrambled his brains. He explains to McMurphy, unlike prison, patients are kept in the hospital as long as the staff desires. It is this conversation that causes McMurphy to fall in line for a time.
- Colonel Matterson: The oldest patient in the ward, he has severe senile dementia and cannot move without a wheelchair. He is a veteran of World War I, and spends his days "explaining" objects through metaphor.

=== Other characters ===
- Candy: The prostitute McMurphy brings on the fishing trip. Billy Bibbit has a crush on her and McMurphy arranges a night for Candy to have sex with him.
- Sandra: Another prostitute and friend of Candy and McMurphy. She and Sefelt sleep together on the night she and Candy are sneaked into the ward. Sefelt has a seizure while they are fornicating.
- Vera Harding: Dale Harding's wife. Described as an attractive lady with very large breasts. She is a primary cause of concern for Dale, who often worries about her fidelity. She reveals to the patients that actually Dale himself has affairs - with other men.

== Controversy ==
One Flew Over the Cuckoo's Nest is one of America's most challenged and banned novels.

- 1974: Five residents of Strongsville, Ohio, sued the local Board of Education to remove the novel from classrooms. They deemed the book "pornographic" and said it "glorifies criminal activity, has a tendency to corrupt juveniles, and contains descriptions of bestiality, bizarre violence, and torture, dismemberment, death, and human elimination".
- 1975: Randolph, New York, and Alton, Oklahoma, removed the book from all of their public schools.
- 1977: Schools in Westport, Maine, removed it from required reading lists.
- 1978: Freemont High School in St. Anthony, Idaho, banned it and fired the teacher who assigned it.
- 1982: Merrimack, New Hampshire High School challenged it.
- 1986: Aberdeen Washington High school challenged it in Honors English classes.
- 2000: Placentia Unified School District (Yorba Linda, California) challenged it. Parents said the teachers could "choose the best books, but they keep choosing this garbage over and over again".

== Adaptations ==
The novel was adapted into a 1963 play, starring Kirk Douglas (who purchased the rights to produce it for the stage and motion pictures) as McMurphy and Gene Wilder as Billy Bibbit. A film adaptation, starring Jack Nicholson and co-produced by Michael Douglas, was released in 1975. The film won five Academy Awards.

The characters of Nurse Ratched and Chief Bromden appear as recurring characters in ABC's Once Upon a Time, where they are portrayed by Ingrid Torrance and Peter Marcin.

Netflix and Ryan Murphy produced a prequel series titled Ratched which follows Sarah Paulson as a younger version of Nurse Ratched. The first of the two-season order was released on September 18, 2020, but the second season was cancelled due to the outbreak of COVID-19 and scheduling conflicts.

== Editions ==
Print

- ISBN 0-606-04239-3 (prebound, 1962)
- ISBN 0-451-16396-6 (mass market paperback, 1963)
- ISBN 0-14-004312-8 (paperback, 1977, reprint)
- ISBN 0-14-023601-5 (hardcover, 1996)
- ISBN 1-55651-685-1 (paperback, 1988)
- ISBN 0-453-00815-1 (audio cassette, 1993, abridged)
- ISBN 0-14-028334-X (paperback, 1999)
- ISBN 0-8220-7154-1 (e-book, 1999)
- ISBN 0-7645-8662-9 (paperback, 2000)
- ISBN 0-7910-6339-9 (library binding, 2001)
- ISBN 0-14-118122-2 (paperback, 2002)
- ISBN 0-7910-7118-9 (paperback)
- ISBN 0-330-23564-8 (paperback)
- ISBN 0-14-118788-3 (paperback, 2005)
- ISBN 0-14-303690-4 (hardcover, 2005)
- ISBN 0-329-06383-9 (hardcover)
- ISBN 978-0-451-16396-7 (softcover)
- ISBN 978-1-59887-052-7 (audio CD, 2006, abridged/read by Kesey; includes Fresh Air with Terry Gross interview with author)
- ISBN 978-0-670-02323-3 (hardcover, 2012)
- ISBN 978-0-143-12951-6 (softcover, 2016)
- Photos of the first edition One Flew Over the Cuckoo's Nest

Audiobooks

- 1998: One Flew Over the Cuckoo's Nest (read by Tom Parker), Blackstone Audio, ISBN 978-0786112784
- 2007 (Audible): One Flew Over the Cuckoo's Nest (read by the author)
- 2012 (Audible): One Flew Over the Cuckoo's Nest (read by John C. Reilly)

== See also ==
- Rosenhan experiment
- Sluggish schizophrenia
- Political abuse of psychiatry
- Anti-psychiatry
