= Strange Bedfellows (play) =

1946 play by Florence Ryerson and Colin Clements

- Original language: English
- Written by: Florence Ryerson and Colin Clements
- Based on: An idea by Elia Kazan
- Subject: Marital political discord
- Genre: Comedy
- Setting: Senator Cromwell's Parlor, October 1896

Premiere
- Date: January 14, 1948
- Place: Morosco Theatre
- Directed by: Benno Schneider

Strange Bedfellows is a play written in 1946 by Florence Ryerson and her husband Colin Clements, from an idea suggested to them by Elia Kazan. It has three acts, five scenes, one setting, and a large cast. The action of the play spans two weeks time in October 1896. The story concerns a retired senator, antithetical to women's suffrage, whose household is stirred up by his new daughter-in-law, a famous suffragette. The three married couples in the household must come to terms with their spouses on suffrage and the larger issue of female obedience in marriage.

Philip A. Waxman produced the play, which was staged by Benno Schneider, with settings by Ralph Alswang and costumes by Morton Haack. The leads were Carl Benton Reid and Joan Tetzel, with Nydia Westman, Ruth Amos, Robin Craven, and John Archer. The play had a tryout in Philadelphia during December 1947 then made its Broadway premiere in January 1948. Critical opinion held it worked as a comedy until falling into farce halfway through. It was popular with audiences, running through July 1948 for 229 performances.

== Characters ==
Characters are listed in order of appearance within their scope, as according to the published play.

Leads

- Senator William Cromwell is 70 and retired; a fussy, bewhiskered curmudgeon with a loud voice.
- Julia Cromwell is 67, the Senator's wife, mother to Addie and Matthew, with a wry sense of humor.
- Addie Cromwell Hampton is the Senator and Julia's older child, whom her mother considers a nit wit.
- Gifford Hampton is 45, the Senator's British son-in-law; rotund, charming, unemployed, never drunk nor sober.
- Matthew Cromwell is the Senator and Julia's son, a congressman and consensus builder, running for re-election.
- Clarissa Blynn Cromwell is Matthew's surprise bride of two weeks from back East, a renowned suffragette. (Note: This term in lieu of suffragist during the play may be thought anachronistic, but it was used in the United States much earlier than in the UK.)

Supporting

- Ling is an elderly Cantonese-speaking servant, whose age and tenure allow him to boss everyone except Julia.
- Lillian Hampton is 15, the Senator's granddaughter, child of Addie and Gifford, Clarissa's first convert.

Featured

- Beulah is the Cromwell's parlor maid, always one crisis behind in the family's ongoing chaos.
- Nicky Hampton is 10, Lillian's little brother, who collects cigar bands and spills her secrets.
- Mrs. Gimble is a minister's wife, and a representative for an anti-suffrage group.
- Mrs. Worley is another woman initially opposed to suffrage.
- Vincent Pemberton is 16, Lillian's current mutual interest.
- Mrs. Tillie Sparker is a madam from the Barbary Coast, opposed to suffrage for business reasons.
- Mayor Ambrose Tibbett is a pudgy, middle-aged fraud.

Bit Players

- Birdie, Zita, and Opal are Barbary Coast gals.

Voice only

- Cheering crowds outside the parlor window

== Synopsis ==
The setting is the parlor of Senator Cromwell's mansion on Nob Hill, San Francisco, during October 1896. The storyline takes place amidst the election campaign for that year, in which William McKinley was elected president.

Act I Scene 1 (Afternoon of a sunny October day.) The residents of the Senator's mansion, the Cromwells, the Hamptons, and the two servants, appear one-by-one to introduce the audience to their personalities. Lillian says Vincent has asked her to ride on a tandem bicycle with him. The Senator forbids it unless a chaperone is there. When Mrs. Gimble and Mrs. Worley arrive, the Senator mistakes them for suffragettes and rails at them. But they have come because Addie is a leader in their anti-suffrage group. Vincent also visits, as the household scurries about awaiting Matthew's return from Washington, D.C. to campaign. When Matthew does appear, he brings a surprise: his wife of two weeks, the famous suffragette, Clarissa Blynn. (Curtain)

Act I Scene 2 (The following Sunday morning.) Ling stops Lillian from pedaling off to distribute fliers for a suffrage meeting. Her parents are horrified at the bloomers she wears, given to her by Clarissa. "Bifurcated abominations" bellows the senator, who blames Matt for not controlling his wife. Clarissa upsets Addie by revealing her anti-suffrage group is partly funded by a liquor ring and the Barbary Coast brothels, who fear being shut down if women could vote. Julia is less surprised, and Clarissa asks why she does not support suffrage? (Curtain)

Act II Scene 1 (Tuesday afternoon.) Mrs. Gimble, Mrs. Worley, and Addie hold a meeting of their anti-suffrage group in the parlor, which Julia also attends. They are surprised when another woman comes to join them: a Mrs. Sparker. A businesswoman of sorts, the other women are flummoxed as they gradually begin to comprehend the nature of her industry. Big Tillie, as her gals call her, is opposed to suffrage for practical economic reasons. As she explains, Addie and her friends grow more dismayed with their new ally, while Julia is almost amused. After the meeting breaks up, Addie and Julia are ready to switch sides, but fear their husbands' wrath. Clarissa tells them about the old Greek play Lysistrata, and suggests a modern revival right there in the Senator's home. (Curtain)

Act II Scene 2 (Some hours later.) Gifford and Matthew commiserate with each other over the unpredictability of female behavior down through the ages. Addie attempts to entice Gifford in order to refuse him, but eventually finds it more effective to withhold his racing news and cocktails. Julia, wiser from the start, serves up the Senator a meager supper of unappetizing plainness, "for his health". Lillian, given an adulterated version of the strategy, torments Vincent, while Matthew gets the full carrot-and-stick approach from Clarissa. The situation comes to a crisis when the bumbling Mayor Tibbett pays a call and inadvertently lets slip the Senator's unwitting financial involvement in the Barbary Coast businesses. (Curtain)

Act III (Still later.) (Curtain)

== Original production ==
=== Background ===
Husband and wife team Colin Clements and Florence Ryerson had written the 1943 hit Harriet, about Harriet Beecher Stowe, for actress Helen Hayes. The director of Harriet, Elia Kazan, gave them what would become the genesis for their conception of Strange Bedfellows, which they acknowledged by giving Kazan a share of the authorial royalties. They took additional inspiration from the Lysistrata of Aristophanes and The Taming of the Shrew. Florence Ryerson told columnist Edwin H. Schloss that they worked separately on the play, as "face to face we find each other too entertaining". Colin Clements concentrated on plot and structure, while his wife worked on dialogue and characterization. Before finishing the first act of the single setting work, they drew up a master plan of the Nob Hill mansion, in order to make the entrances and exits logically consistent.

During the production of Harriet it had proved necessary to cut most lines for the title character's daughter, played by young Joan Tetzel. Sympathetic to her disappointment, Ryerson and Clements promised that she would have a leading part in their next play. They fulfilled that promise by writing the role of Clarissa Blynn Cromwell for her.

The writing of Strange Bedfellows was complete by the summer of 1946. It was initially purchased by Richard Kollmar, Frank Satenstein, and Bernard Simon. Kollmar and Satenstein sold their shares to Philip A. Waxman in September 1946. A year later Waxman was able to announce Strange Bedfellows would open that season with a budget of $70,000. Ralph Alswang would do scenery, and Morton Haack was signed for costumes, while Benno Schneider would direct. Joan Tetzel was the first cast member signed; the playwrights and director Benno Schneider joined producer Waxman in New York to cast the remaining parts during November 1947.

Carl Benton Reid, Aline MacMahon, and John Archer were signed for leading parts by early December 1947, with a tryout announced for Philadelphia later that month to be followed by a Broadway premiere in January 1948. However, Aline MacMahon was struck by influenza during rehearsals, and was replaced in the role of Julia Cromwell by Ruth Amos. Ruth Amos told reporter Margaret Mara that the costumes, designed by then 23-year-old Morton Haack, were "authentic period gowns with the exception of the zipper fasteners", and that one of them weighed 25 pounds. The actresses were worried about the zippers showing, but preferred not having to deal with buttons and hooks.

=== Cast ===
Cast for the Philadelphia tryout and during the Broadway run.
Role	Actor	Dates	Notes and sources
Senator William Cromwell	Carl Benton Reid	Dec 27, 1947 - Jul 04, 1948	Reid left to spend the summer in Maine, as he was suffering from poor health.
Senator William Cromwell	Louis Hector	Jul 06, 1948 - Jul 31, 1948	
Julia Cromwell	Ruth Amos	Dec 27, 1947 - Jul 31, 1948	Amos took the part just four days before the tryout when Aline MacMahon caught influenza.
Addie Cromwell Hampton	Nydia Westman	Dec 27, 1947 - Jul 31, 1948	
Gifford Hampton	Robin Craven	Dec 27, 1947 - Jul 31, 1948	
Matthew Cromwell	John Archer	Dec 27, 1947 - May 30, 1948	Archer left for a Hollywood commitment.
Matthew Cromwell	Richard Coogan	Jun 01, 1948 - Jul 31, 1948	
Clarissa Blynn Cromwell	Joan Tetzel	Dec 27, 1947 - Jun 20, 1948	Her understudy, Ludie Claire, performed two evening shows in February 1948 when Tetzel was out sick.
Clarissa Blynn Cromwell	Neva Patterson	Jun 22, 1948 - Jul 31, 1948	
Ling	Tom Chung Yun	Dec 27, 1947 - Jul 31, 1948	
Lillian Hampton	Mary Kay Jones	Dec 27, 1947 - Jul 31, 1948	Jones was 22 when she played 15-year-old Lillian. She continued to star in Mary Kay and Johnny during this run. (Note: As the weekly 15 minute show on WABD-TV was broadcast live on Tuesdays at 7:15 pm, Jones and Nydia Westman, who also appeared on Mary Kay and Johnny, had little more than an hour to reach the Morosco Theatre for the play's opening curtain at 8:40pm.)
Beulah	Leta Bonynge	Dec 27, 1947 - Jul 31, 1948	
Nicky Hampton	Billy Nevard	Dec 27, 1947 - Jul 31, 1948	
Mrs. Gimble	Frieda Altman	Dec 27, 1947 - Jul 31, 1948	
Mrs. Worley	Marion Weeks	Dec 27, 1947 - Mar 11, 1948	
Mrs. Worley	Dorthea Duckworth	Mar 12, 1948 - Jul 31, 1948	
Vincent Pemberton	Michael Hall	Dec 27, 1947 - Jul 31, 1948	
Mrs. Tillie Sparker	Doris Rich	Dec 27, 1947 - Jul 31, 1948	
Mayor Ambrose Tibbett	Percy Helton	Dec 27, 1947 - Jan 10, 1948	Helton left after the tryout to film his part in the Paramount Pictures comedy Hazard.
Mayor Ambrose Tibbett	William Lee	Jan 14, 1948 - Jul 31, 1948	

=== Tryout ===
Strange Bedfellows had a two-week tryout at the Locust Street Theatre in Philadelphia, starting December 27, 1947. Reviewer Edwin H. Schloss said the play "is more literately written than the average piece of trade goods of its class" and performed by a strong cast. But he also thought there was only "one genuinely amusing scene" and too much evocative of Lysistrata. Critic Linton Martin thought Strange Bedfellows was "mildly and intermittently amusing", "literate and likeable", but lacked real comedy and proceeded towards a too obvious conclusion. After opening night, columnist Louis Calta reported that the third act of Strange Bedfellows was to be extensively revised, but the changes would not delay its Broadway premiere.

During the tryout period author Colin Clements suffered a heart attack. He was admitted to the Philadelphia Jewish Hospital on January 7, and confined to an oxygen tent. His condition became critical on January 23, and he died there on January 29, 1948.

=== Broadway premiere and reception ===
The production had its Broadway premiere at the Morosco Theatre on January 14, 1948. Reviewer George Currie thought it was "jolly" even if not original, noted the associations with Lysistrata, and also suggested a more recent influence in Bloomer Girl. Brooks Atkinson was not impressed with the production: "But Strange Bedfellows, being hokum comedy, has bred a hokum performance, and none of the actors can be especially proud of what they are doing". He also lamented Benno Schneider, once celebrated for progressive direction, who "has staged the Clements piece like an Al Woods farce". John Chapman enjoyed the play but thought it could have been better: "For an act and a half Miss Ryerson and Mr. Clements have a superior comedy... For the next act and a half they muddle around with farce, instead of comedy, as if they didn't know how good a thing they had and were a little uncertain about what to do next". He concluded with some praise for the cast and direction, and suggested audiences would have a good time if they just "let the art of dramaturgy go hang".

WCBS-TV broadcast live excerpts of the play and interviews with the performers on April 27, 1948, during its regular Tuesday Tonight on Broadway program. As this coincided with the time period for the live Mary Kay and Johnny show on another network, Mary Kay Jones and Nydia Westman would have had to skip one or the other program.

The Morosco Theatre was air-conditioned, allowing Strange Bedfellows to continue running into June and July. The production reached its 200th performance on July 6, 1948. Philip A. Waxman acquired the film rights for Strange Bedfellows, which he hoped to make in Hollywood, but ran into problems with the title. Twentieth Century-Fox had already reserved it for a different movie, to star Dana Andrews.

=== Closing ===
On July 31, 1948, Strange Bedfellows closed at the Morosco Theatre, after 229 performances.

== Bibliography ==
- Florence Ryerson and Colin Clements. Strange Bedfellows: A Comedy in Three Acts. Samuel French, 1948.
