= Randle McMurphy =

Protagonist in One Flew Over the Cuckoo's Nest

- One Flew Over the Cuckoo's Nest character
- Jack Nicholson as Randle McMurphy in the 1975 film One Flew Over the Cuckoo's Nest
- First appearance: One Flew Over the Cuckoo's Nest (novel, 1962)
- Last appearance: One Flew Over the Cuckoo's Nest (film, 1975)
- Created by: Ken Kesey
- Portrayed by: Jack Nicholson

In-universe information
- Full name: Randle Patrick McMurphy
- Alias: R.P. McMurphy
- Nickname: Mac
- Species: Human
- Gender: Male
- Occupation: Veteran; Criminal
- Nationality: Irish-American
- Birthplace: Salem, Oregon, United States, 1925

Randle Patrick "Mac" McMurphy (also known as R.P. McMurphy) is the protagonist of Ken Kesey's novel One Flew Over the Cuckoo's Nest (1962). He appears in the stage and film adaptations of the novel as well. Jack Nicholson portrayed Randle Patrick McMurphy in the 1975 film adaptation, earning him an Academy Award for Best Actor. He was nominated on the "Heroes" list of AFI's 100 Years...100 Heroes & Villains, but did not make the final list. In 2019 he was ranked by film magazine Empire as the 99th Greatest Movie Character of All Time. McMurphy is an Irish American brawler and Korean War veteran who feigns insanity to be transferred from a prison work farm to a mental institution. There, he challenges the authority of the tyrannical Nurse Ratched.

== Fictional character biography ==
Randle Patrick McMurphy is an Irish American brawler found guilty of battery, gambling and statutory rape. He is a Korean War veteran who was a POW during the war and was awarded the Distinguished Service Cross for leading a breakout from a Chinese camp, but was dishonorably discharged for insubordination. He is sentenced to serve six months at a prison work farm, but feigns insanity after two months to be transferred to a mental institution, where he expects to serve the rest of his time in comparative comfort and luxury.

McMurphy's ward in the mental institution is run by the tyrannical Nurse Ratched, who has cowed the patients into submission. McMurphy makes it his mission to flout Ratched's regime of rules and punishment and to liberate the other patients from her grip.

During his short stay at the hospital, McMurphy forms deep friendships with two of his fellow patients: Billy Bibbit, a manchild who has a stutter, whom Ratched has dominated into a suicidal mess; and Chief Bromden, a Native American feigning deafness and mutism. In the former, McMurphy sees a younger brother figure whom he wants to teach to have fun, while the latter is his only real confidant.

McMurphy becomes ensnared in a number of power-games with Nurse Ratched. He ends up as the clear winner, reminding the other patients how to enjoy life and stand up for themselves, and persuading them to act out against Ratched's bullying. Ratched unsuccessfully tries to break his spirit through repeated shock therapy treatments.

In the novel's climax, McMurphy sneaks two prostitutes into the ward to take Billy's virginity, while he and the others throw a party. Ratched catches them and threatens to tell Billy's mother, the only woman he fears more than her, which terrifies him so much that he commits suicide by slitting his throat. Enraged, McMurphy assaults her and chokes her nearly to death, but is knocked unconscious by one of the hospital's orderlies. For this, Ratched has McMurphy lobotomized, which is to be seen as a kind of castration: "If she [Ratched] can't cut below the belt she’ll do it above the eyes". Chief Bromden, seeing what Ratched has done to McMurphy, smothers him with a pillow in an act of euthanasia, and then breaks a window to flee from the asylum, fulfilling McMurphy's wish for him to be free. Ratched, meanwhile, has been rendered unable to speak after McMurphy's assault, breaking her hold over her patients.

== Critical response ==
Richard Gray considers McMurphy "swaggering, bold, and with an incorrigible sense of humor" and an "authentic Irish rebel ... who offers the inmates the example and chance of independence." Further, Glen O. Gabbard and Krin Gabbard, the authors of Psychiatry and the Cinema, write that McMurphy "becomes a Christ figure for whom shock therapy is the crown of thorns and lobotomy the cross".

McMurphy's domination of Ratched is described as a heroic sacrifice, for the redemption and freedom of the men of the ward. When Ratched returns to the ward following the attack, she is bruised and fearful, and no longer has the same measure of control over her patients due to McMurphy exposing her vulnerabilities.

== In other media ==
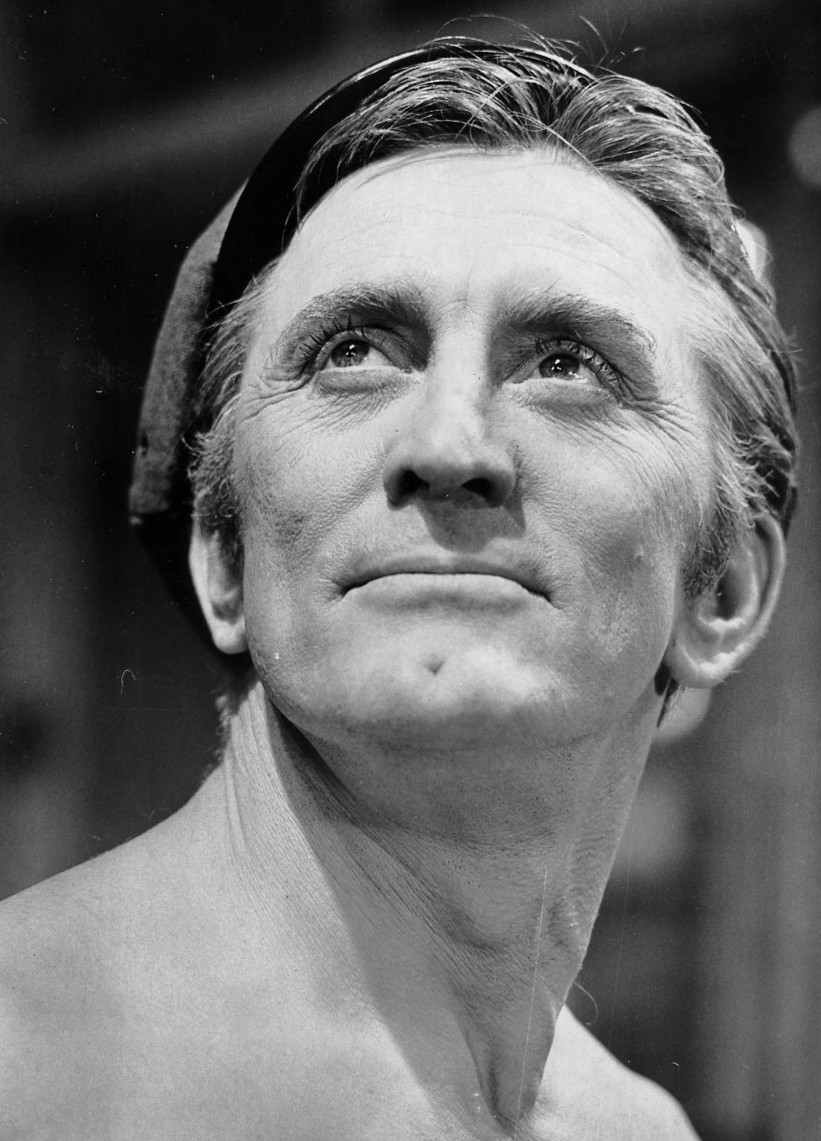
Kirk Douglas as Randle McMurphy in the 1963 Broadway production

=== Theatre ===
McMurphy has been played on stage by Jérôme Pradon, Kirk Douglas, Leonard Nimoy, William Devane, Aleksandr Abdulov, Gary Sinise, Christian Slater, Shane Richie, Martin Sheen, Roman Wilhelmi (Polish adaptation), Bernard Tapie (French adaptation), Ibrahim Amr, (Egyptian adaptation), Jeff Smith at the Performance Network, Ann Arbor, Michigan, 1984, Jiří Hrdina (Czech adaptation) and Artūrs Skrastiņš at the Dailes Theatre in Riga, Latvia.
