= Girl o' My Dreams =

1934 film by Ray McCarey

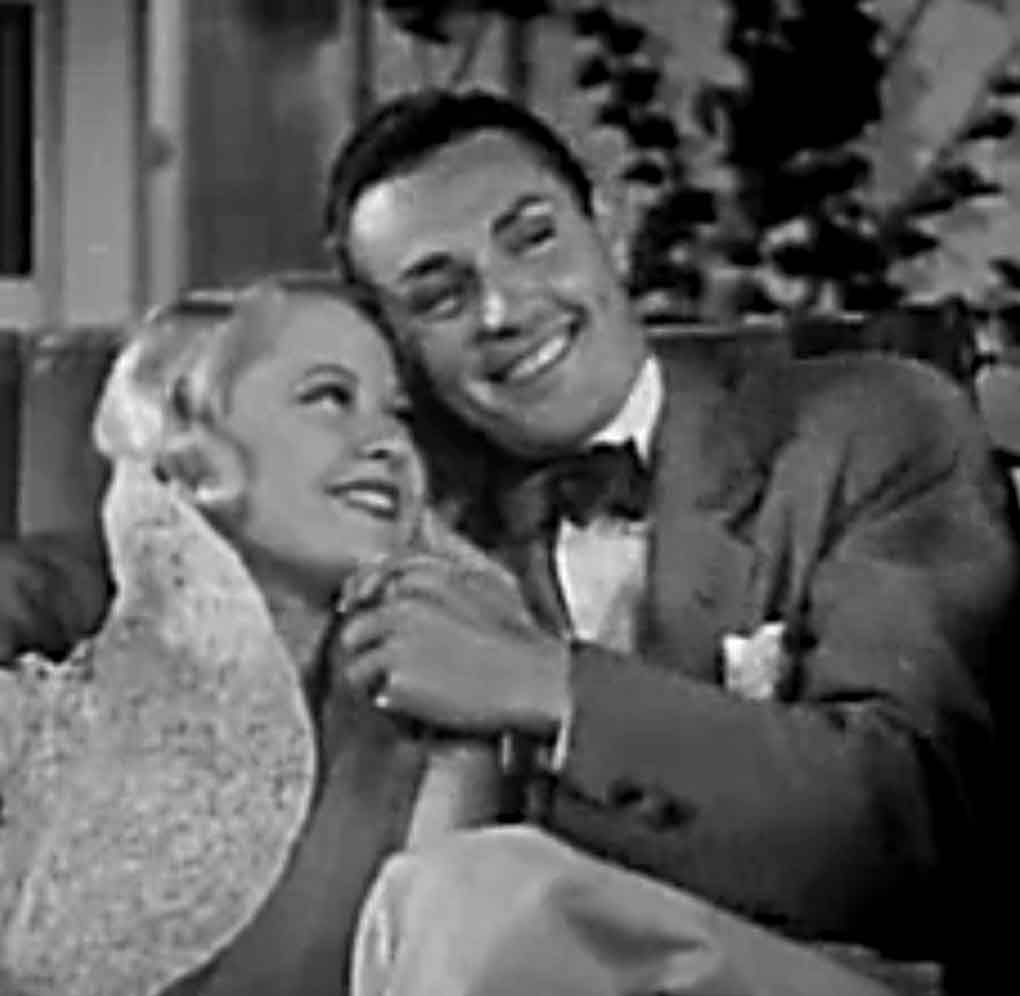
- Mary Carlisle and Edward J. Nugent in Girl o' My Dreams (1934)
- Directed by: Ray McCarey
- Written by: George Waggner (screenplay); George Waggner (story)
- Produced by: William T. Lackey
- Starring: Mary Carlisle; Sterling Holloway; Eddie Nugent; Arthur Lake; Creighton Chaney; Gigi Parrish
- Cinematography: Ira H. Morgan
- Edited by: Jack Ogilvie
- Music by: Edward Ward
- Distributed by: Monogram Pictures
- Release date: November 17, 1934
- Running time: 65 to 70 minutes
- Country: United States
- Language: English

Girl o' My Dreams (a.k.a. Love Race) is a 1934 American college comedy film directed by Ray McCarey and featuring Sterling Holloway and Lon Chaney Jr.

== Plot ==
Larry Haines is the school's track champion. The “Big Man on Campus”, his success goes straight to his head. His friends, Spec Early, Bobby Barnes, and his girlfriend Gwen, get fed up with him, and his swollen head.

They decide that he needs to get his big head deflated; so, they rig the “Joe Senior” college contest, so Larry comes in second. They make sure Don Cooper wins; and, he begins to go out with Gwen, much to the dismay of his own steady girlfriend Mary.

It soon becomes clear that Mary's not the only thing Don's forgotten about. It looks like both Don and Larry are in such a muddle they, and their school, are going to lose the track meet. Once again, it's up to the girls to sort out the mess, and spur them on to victory.

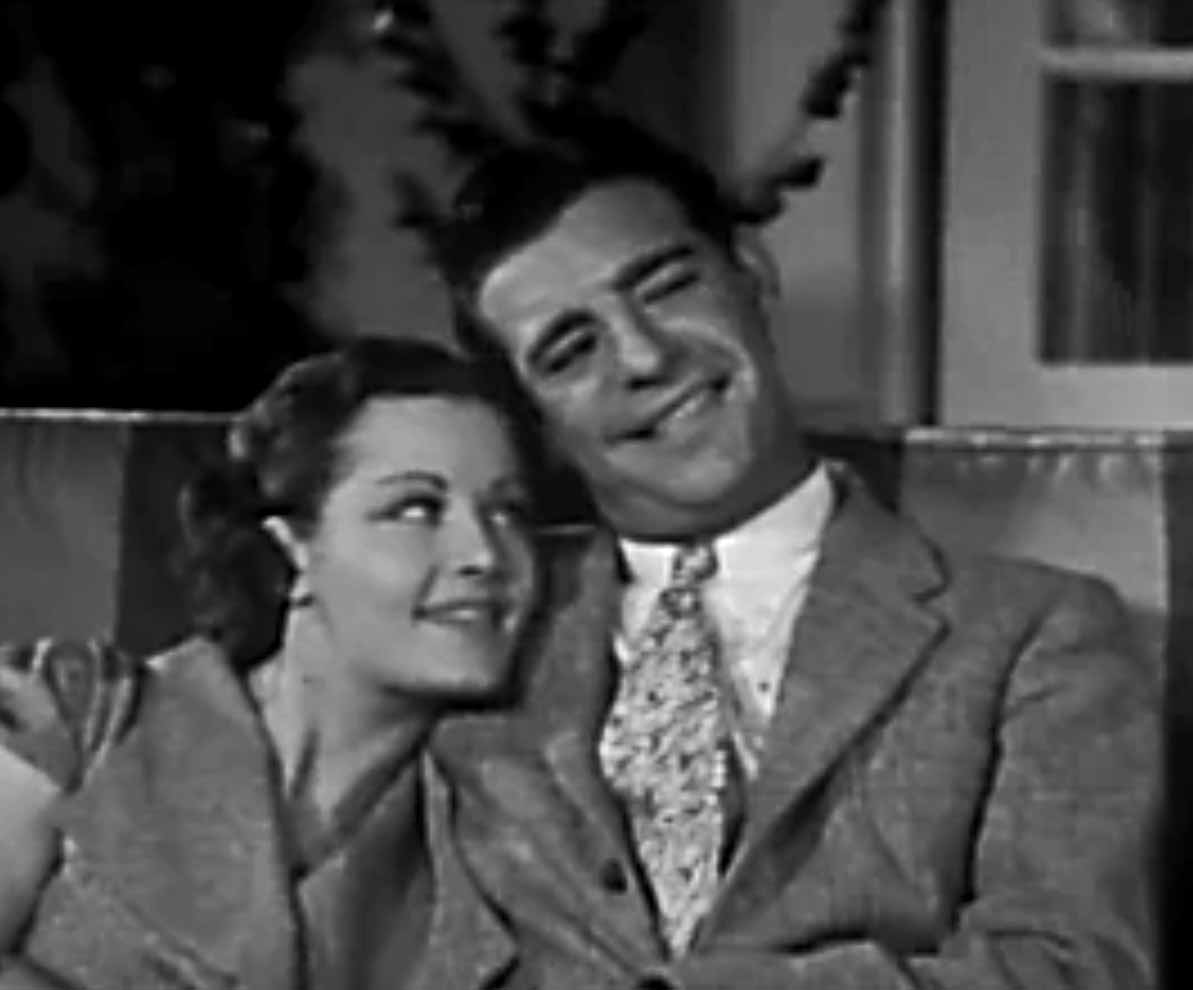
Gigi Parrish and Lon Chaney Jr., in Girl o' My Dreams (1934)

== Cast ==
- Mary Carlisle as Gwen
- Sterling Holloway as Spec Early
- Edward J. Nugent as Larry Haines
- Arthur Lake as Bobby Barnes
- Lon Chaney Jr. as Don Cooper
- Tom Dugan as Joe Smiley
- Gigi Parrish as Mary
- Jeanie Roberts as Kittens
- Betty Mae Crane of The Crane Sisters as 'Nip and Tuck' Twin
- Beverly Crane of The Crane Sisters as 'Nip and Tuck' Twin
- Lee Shumway as Coach
- Ted Dahl as Orchestra Leader
