= Carol Weld =

Foreign correspondent and writer

- Carol Weld ca 1919
- Born: March 19, 1903; New York, United States
- Died: March 31, 1979 (aged 76); Miami, Florida, United States
- Other name: Florence Carol Greene
- Occupation: journalist
- Known for: collaboration with Frank Buck
- Spouse: John Weld (1927-1932)

Carol Weld (March 19, 1903 – March 31, 1979) was an American journalist. She worked for various New York newspapers and as a foreign correspondent for news agencies in Paris. She was a founding member of the Overseas Press Club and collaborated with Frank Buck on Animals Are Like That.

== Early life ==
Carol Weld (née Florence Carol Greene) was the daughter of Sonia Greene and stepdaughter of H. P. Lovecraft. She broke with her mother when Sonia wouldn't let her marry her half-uncle, and left Sonia's apartment when she could, completing only three years of high school. She was married to a newspaperman, John Weld, from 1927-1932. John Weld was a reporter for the New York Herald Tribune in Paris and the New York American and New York World in New York City, wrote screenplays for Columbia and Universal, as well as fiction and non-fiction books.

== Journalism ==
Carol Weld worked on the local staffs of the New York American and the New York Herald Tribune before going to Paris in the early 1930s. In a 1928 article for the New York Times, she lamented that the automobile had mostly replaced the blacksmith, whose work consisted "chiefly of designing and reproducing wrought iron door hinges, candelabra of the twelfth century, lamps and smoking accessories and other objects which once upon a time were utilitarian. An ironworker finds it comparatively simple to be artistic after the early American manner by studying the art magazines."

== Foreign correspondent ==
When Weld arrived in Paris in the late nineteen twenties, foreign journalism did not pay well. She subsisted on a meager salary and on the sale of some of her drawings of American life to Arthur Moss, publisher of an art magazine, Gargoyle, Weld worked for The Universal Service, International News Service and United Press. One of her most memorable articles was "King Bites Dog," in which she advanced the theory that the abdication of Edward VIII was due to conservative objections to his "political color" rather than to his romance with Mrs. Wallis Simpson. The best part is her account of meeting the Prince of Wales, as he then was, in a second-class carriage carrying some of his own baggage:

"It was midsummer in 1934 when I covered the departure of the Prince and Mrs. Simpson for Biarritz. At the Gare d'Orsay the deluxe afternoon train had departed with a tin-whistle toot but no sign of royalty or a Baltimore woman. Ric, my fox terrier, who was a much better disguise to press-shy celebrities than a pair of false whiskers and who was responsible for two beats I had scored, pulled at his leash, scampering toward the deuxième classe train. Royalty traveling second? I had my doubts, but I lifted Ric to the platform. He tugged, pulled me into the corridor of the deuxième wagon-lit. Ahead of me the Prince of Wales came from one door and disappeared through the next, carrying a piece of luggage. Man Bites Dog, I thought. On the train must be valets, his aide-decamp, then Major [General John] Aird [the Prince's Equerry], and Scotland Yard detectives. Yet I saw the Prince moving baggage. In such democratic tendencies lay nourishment for a much bigger dog. This, as I realized long after, had been Prince Bites Puppy. The bigger the man, the bigger the dog. Before I could turn Ric about, the future King and Duke of Windsor again emerged and we collided in the narrow passageway."

Weld was a founding member of the Overseas Press Club. When the Paris paper, the Tribune, died in 1934, a victim of the Depression, Weld, under the headline "Girl Reporter Tells It All on Last Day," affectionately recalled some of her colleagues' "conversational identifications." Ralph Jules Frantz: "Did you get the story? Swell!" Louis Atlas: "I'm fed up. Where you going to eat?" May Birkhead: "Be that as it may ..." B. J. Kospoth: "What's that? I've been at the Embassy all afternoon. But there's no story there." Edmond Taylor: "Call me up if anything breaks." Wilfred Barber: "That was July 2, 1887 at 3:10 in the morning, and it was raining, because ..." Robert Sage: "There's not enough air in here, let's open a window." Alex Small: "My dear fellow! Didn't you know? Why of course, Louis XIV, when he built the palace at Versailles, said . . ." Robert L. Stern: "You can't write that! You gotta have a new lead." Mary Fentress: "American Hospital? Anybody dead?"

== Collaboration with Frank Buck ==
Weld was co-author of one book with Frank Buck: Animals Are Like That (1939).

Weld did public relations for Buck, in particular for his 1939 World's Fair Jungleland exhibit, and also handled his west coast publicity.

== Later life ==
In 1940-42 Carol Weld worked for the British-American Ambulance Corps. Additionally, she organized and served as corps chairman for the West Coast Committee for the American Volunteer Ambulance Corps in France (at 9710 and 11716 Santa Monica Boulevard, Los Angeles). From 1943-48, Weld was a press representative for RKO Radio. In 1951, with a colleague, Dickson Hartwell, Carol Weld wrote an admiring article about Taborian Hospital in Mound Bayou, Mississippi. When the hospital opened in 1942, African-American patients in the Delta could, for the first time, walk through the front door of a medical facility rather than through the side entrance marked "colored." Until 1967 the Taborian Hospital and its fraternal rival in Mound Bayou, the Friendship Clinic, which had been founded in 1948, provided medical services to thousands of Mississippi African-Americans. In 1954, Weld worked as the editor for the New Smyrna Times in New Smyrna, Florida.

Weld retired to Florida (1512 Glencoe Road, Winter Park) and worked as a freelance writer. She died in Miami after a long illness.
