= Nurse Ratched =

Main antagonist of Ken Kesey's 1962 novel One Flew Over the Cuckoo's Nest

Mildred Ratched
- One Flew Over the Cuckoo's Nest character
- Louise Fletcher as Nurse Ratched in the 1975 film adaptation
- First appearance: One Flew Over the Cuckoo's Nest (1962)
- Created by: Ken Kesey
- Portrayed by: Joan Tetzel (play); Louise Fletcher (film); Sarah Paulson (Ratched)

In-universe information
- Full name: Mildred Ratched (film, TV series)
- Alias: Big Nurse
- Gender: Female
- Occupation: Nurse
- Significant others: Gwendolyn Briggs (TV series); Charles Wainwright (TV series)
- Nationality: American
- Birthplace: Salem, Oregon, United States

Nurse Ratched (full name Mildred Ratched in the movie, also known as "Big Nurse") is a fictional character and the main antagonist of One Flew Over the Cuckoo's Nest, first featured in Ken Kesey's 1962 novel as well as the 1975 film adaptation. A coldhearted, abusive, and passive-aggressive tyrant, Nurse Ratched has become the stereotype of the nurse as a battleaxe, as well as a popular metaphor for the corrupting influence of institutional power and authority in bureaucracies such as the psychiatric treatment center in which the novel is set.

Nurse Ratched is the head administrative nurse at the Salem State Hospital, a mental institution where she exercises near-absolute power over the patients' access to medications, privileges, and basic necessities such as food and toiletries. She capriciously revokes these privileges whenever a patient displeases her. Her superiors turn a blind eye because she maintains order, keeping the patients from acting out, either through antipsychotic and anticonvulsant drugs or her own brand of psychotherapy, which consists mostly of humiliating patients into doing her bidding. Her tyrannical rule and her cruel personality stem from her time as an army nurse during World War II.

== Creation ==
=== Origin ===
Author Kesey stated that he based Ratched on the head nurse of the psychiatric ward where he worked. He later ran into her at an aquarium, realizing "She was much smaller than I remembered, and a whole lot more human." The 1940s pageboy hairstyle was, according to Louise Fletcher, "a symbol that life had stopped for [Ratched] a long time ago".

=== Appearance ===
In Ken Kesey's novel, Ratched "the Big Nurse" is described by Chief Bromden according to him: "She had a face that is smooth, calculated, and precision-made, like an expensive baby doll, skin like flesh-colored enamel which is a blend of white and cream, with baby-blue eyes, and a small nose with pink little nostrils. The only features that does not match Ratched's appearance are her lips and fingernails that are both an "odd" or "funny" red-orange, like the tip of a soldering iron, a color that looks so hot or so cold that if she touches someone with it, no one could tell which."

Her breasts are described as either "massive" or "over-sized". She wears a white, heavily starched nurse's uniform that she uses to conceal her top-heavy bosom as she is ashamed and embittered of them. She wears her hair in a tight bun and high heels where she walks stiffly everywhere she goes, and sometimes carries a woven wicker bag that contains pills, needles, wire, and forceps.

To everyone else, she is a dull-looking middle-aged woman and is mainly an intimidating nurse who comes off as a twisted maternal figure to her patients. Milos Forman's depiction of the character, who is played by Louise Fletcher, however, is based on the stage-play performances of the character in Broadway, New York.

== Character biography ==
Patient Dale Harding says Ratched had been an army nurse in the 1930s, as does the nurse who runs the disturbed ward. When Randle McMurphy arrives at the hospital, he flouts her rules with impunity and inspires other patients to follow. Her attempts to cow him into submission—at first with threats and mild punishments, then with shock therapy—are unsuccessful, serving only to fuel his defiance.

McMurphy helps organize an unauthorized party late one evening, and they invite two prostitute friends, Sandra and Candy, into the asylum. After noticing fellow patient Billy Bibbitt has a crush on Candy, McMurphy encourages her to have sex with him. Ratched catches Billy and Candy in the act. Furious, she threatens to tell his mother. He begs her not to, blaming McMurphy and the other patients for orchestrating the event.

Ratched sends him to wait in the ward doctor's office as the authorities are called. When Dr. Spivey finally arrives, he finds Billy has killed himself. When Ratched tells the inmates that "the best thing we can do is to go on with our daily routine", McMurphy attacks her in a fit of rage, nearly strangling her. Ratched has McMurphy lobotomized in retribution. However, McMurphy's attack leaves Ratched weakened and bruised, and she loses her absolute control over the ward because the patients no longer fear her.

== Other portrayals ==
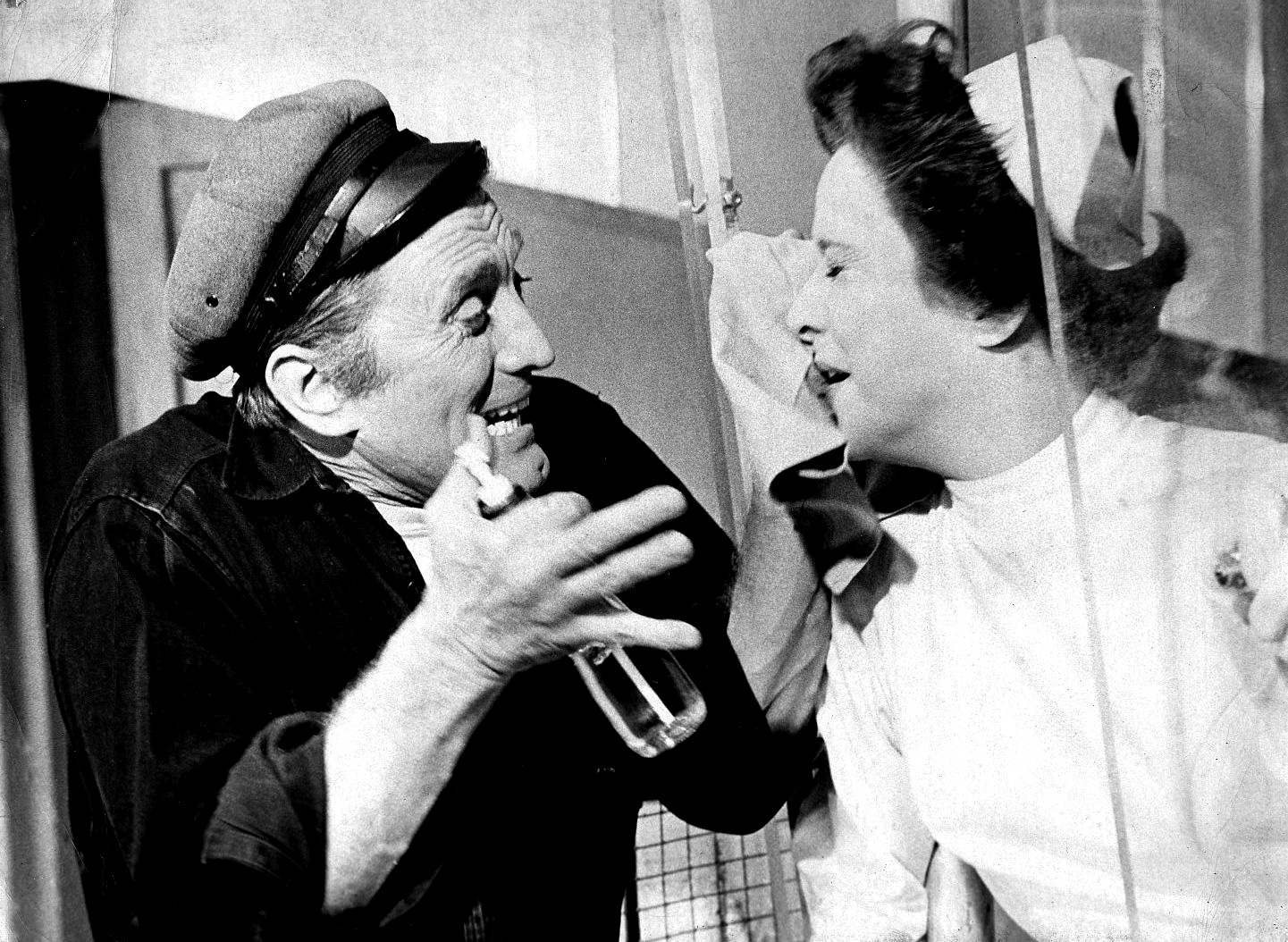
Kirk Douglas (left) as Randle McMurphy, and Joan Tetzel (right) as Nurse Ratched in the 1963 Broadway production

A stage adaptation by Dale Wasserman made its Broadway debut in 1963 with Joan Tetzel as Nurse Ratched. Amy Morton portrayed Ratched in the 2001 Broadway revival.

The character was portrayed by Louise Fletcher in the film adaptation, whose performance earned her the Academy Award for Best Actress. Fletcher, who, up to that point, had only had a brief television career in the 1950s and early 1960s and had only appeared in two films (one uncredited), was cast after Anne Bancroft, Angela Lansbury, Geraldine Page, Colleen Dewhurst, and Ellen Burstyn turned down the role. Director Miloš Forman considered Fletcher for Ratched when he saw her in the 1974 film Thieves Like Us.

Nurse Ratched was a recurring character in the ABC series Once Upon a Time from 2012 through 2017. She was portrayed by Ingrid Torrance and works for the Evil Queen as a nurse in the Storybrooke Sanitarium.

Nurse Ratched is played by actor Michael St Michaels and its featured in the music video called Choosing Mental Illness by the metal band Philip H. Anselmo & The Illegals. The band is fronted by Pantera singer Phil Anselmo. Anselmo plays Jack Nicholson's character in the music video.

Sarah Paulson portrays Nurse Ratched in Ryan Murphy's Netflix television series Ratched, a prequel to the One Flew Over the Cuckoo's Nest film, the first season of which debuted September 18, 2020. Isabelle JoLynn Murphy portrays a young Ratched.

== Legacy ==
Fletcher won the Academy Award for Best Actress for her portrayal of Ratched in the film. Ratched was named the fifth-greatest villain in film history (and second-greatest villainess, behind the Wicked Witch of the West of The Wizard of Oz) by the American Film Institute in their series 100 Years...100 Heroes & Villains.
