= One Flew Over the Cuckoo's Nest (play) =

Play by Dale Wasserman

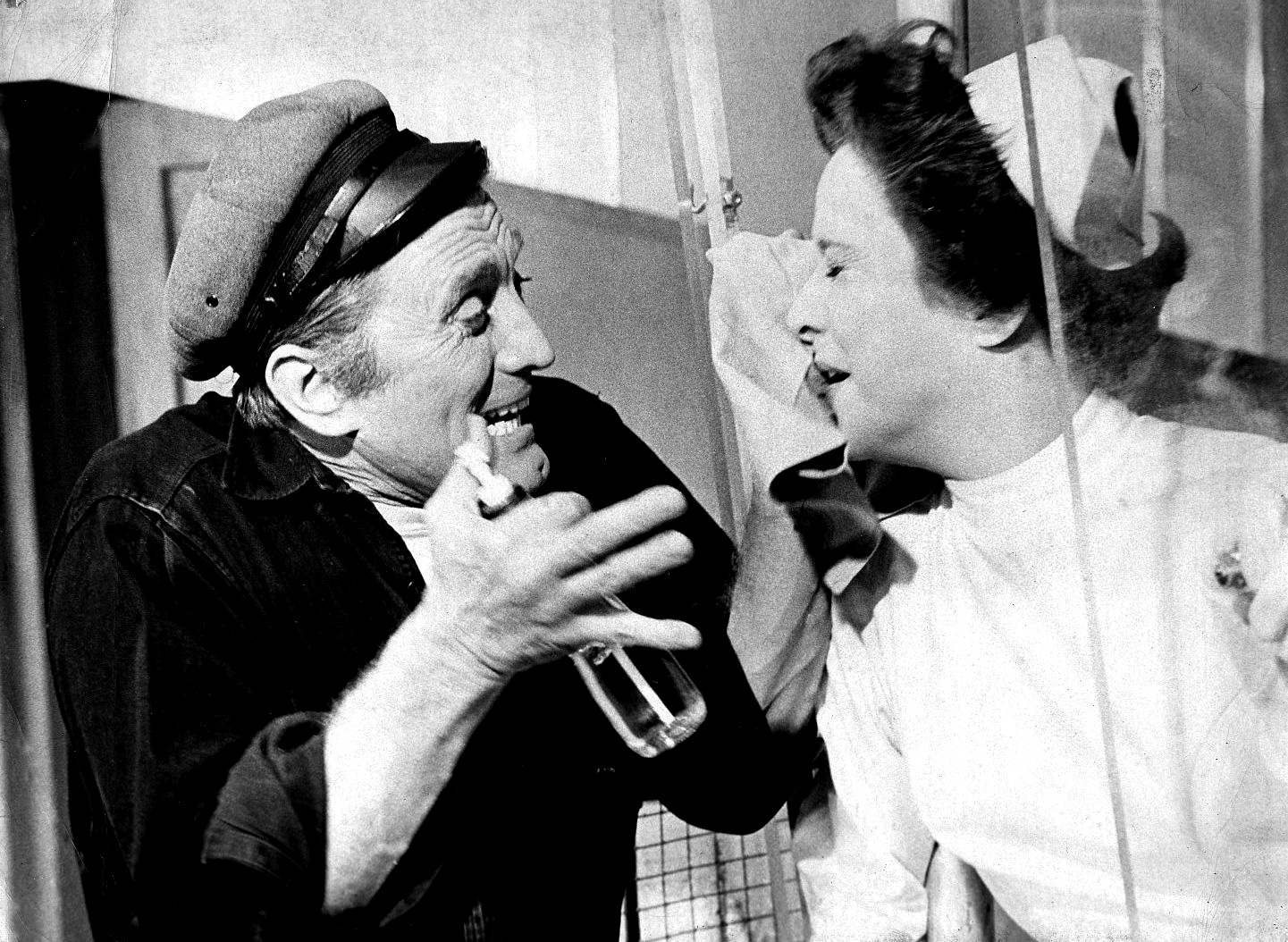
- Kirk Douglas and Joan Tetzel starring in the 1963 Broadway production
- Original language: English
- Written by: Dale Wasserman
- Subject: One Flew Over the Cuckoo's Nest by Ken Kesey

Premiere
- Date: November 13, 1963
- Place: Cort Theatre; New York City

One Flew Over the Cuckoo's Nest (1963) is a play based on Ken Kesey's 1962 novel. The play had its Broadway debut in 1963 with an adaptation by Dale Wasserman starring Kirk Douglas as Randle McMurphy, a mental patient and Joan Tetzel as Nurse Ratched. The play had a Broadway revival in 2002 earning the Tony Award for Best Revival of a Play as well as a nomination for the Tony Award for Best Actor in a Play starring Gary Sinise.

== Background ==
The play is based on the 1962 novel by Ken Kesey. It was adapted by Dale Wasserman.

== Summary ==
The plot revolves around mental hospital patient Randle McMurphy who leads a revolt against cold Nurse Ratched.

== Cast and characters ==
Character	Broadway debut	Broadway revival	West End revival
Character	1963	2001	2003
Randle McMurphy	Kirk Douglas	Gary Sinise	Christian Slater
Nurse Ratched	Joan Tetzel	Amy Morton	Frances Barber
"Chief" Bromden	Ed Ames	Tim Sampson	Brendan Dempsey
Dale Harding	William Daniels	Ross Lehman	Owen O'Neill
Billy Bibbit	Gene Wilder	Eric Johner	Mackenzie Crook
Charlie Cheswick	Gerald S. O'Loughlin	Rick Snyder	Phil Nichol
Martini	Al Nesor	Danton Stone	Ian Coppinger
Dr. John Spivey	Rex Robbins	K. Todd Freeman	Tim Ahern

== Origin ==
Dale Wasserman's stage adaptation, with music by Teiji Ito, made its Broadway preview on November 12, 1963, its premiere on November 13, and ran until January 25, 1964, for a total of one preview and 82 performances. The 1963–64 Broadway production starred Douglas as Randle Patrick McMurphy, Gene Wilder as Billy Bibbit, William Daniels as Harding, Ed Ames as "Chief" Bromden, Al Nesor as Martini, and Joan Tetzel as Nurse Ratched. Douglas retained the rights to make a film version of One Flew Over the Cuckoo's Nest for a decade, but was unable to find a studio willing to make it with him. Eventually, he gave the rights to his son Michael, who succeeded in getting the film produced. At that time, Kirk Douglas was deemed too old for the role of McMurphy, and the role was given to Jack Nicholson.

== Productions ==
Since then, the play has had two revivals: first off-Broadway in 1971, directed by Lee Sankowich with Danny DeVito as Martini and William Devane as McMurphy, then as a Broadway production in 2001 with Gary Sinise as McMurphy. The film version One Flew Over the Cuckoo's Nest was released in 1975, whose movie rights were secured through Kirk Douglas's rights to the play. DeVito reprised his stage role in the 1975 film of the same name directed by Milos Forman starring Jack Nicholson.

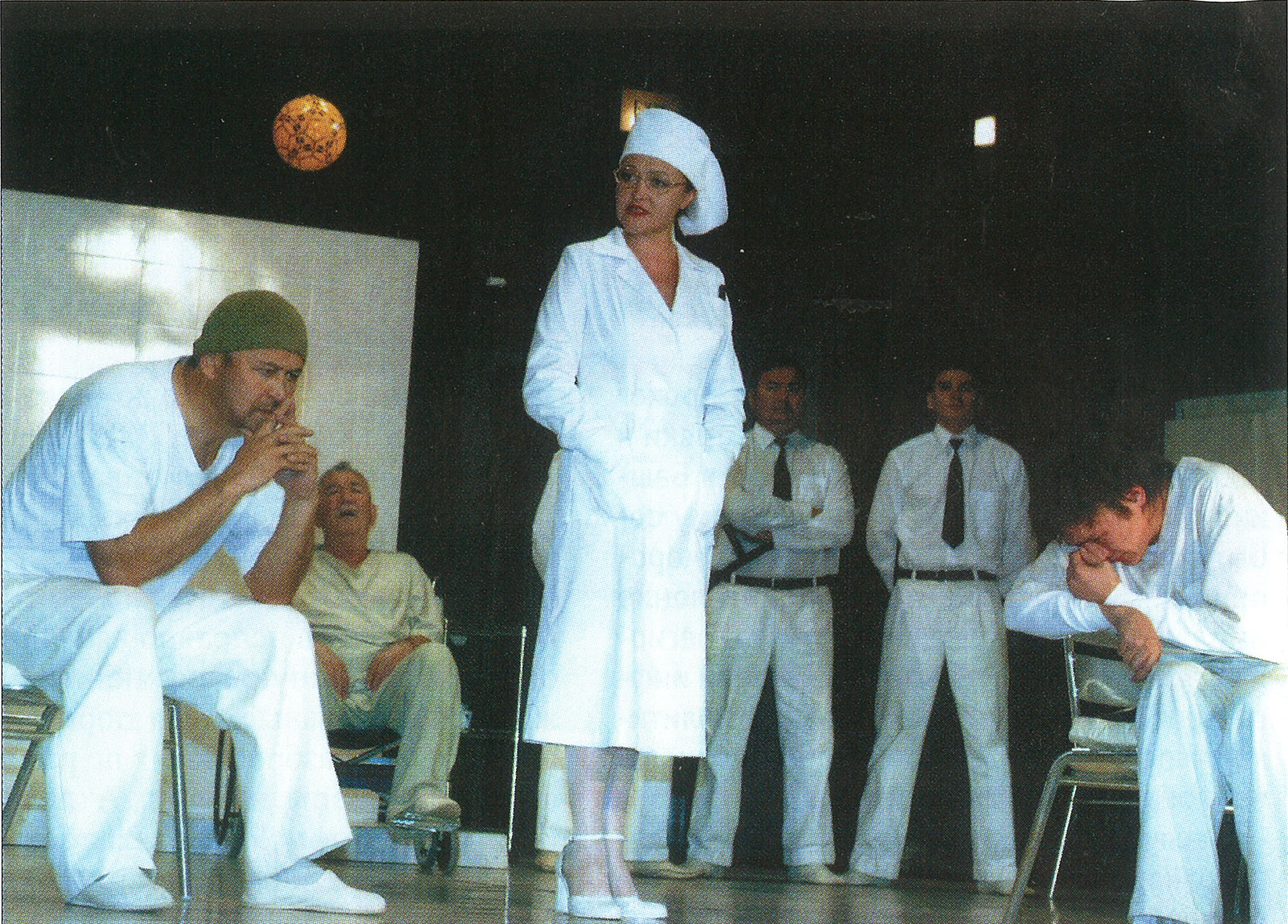
A scene from a Bashkir Academic Drama Theater production of One Flew Over the Cuckoo's Nest

In 1982 Greg Hersov directed a production at the Royal Exchange, Manchester with Jonathan Hackett as Randle McMurphy, Linda Marlowe as Nurse Ratched and Tim McInnerny as Billy Bibbitt. In April 1988, the Playhouse Theatre was the site for the first London production of One Flew Over the Cuckoo's Nest. The play was brought to the London stage by Cuckoo Productions, formed by Diane Hilton, Karin Parnaby, and Judy Kershaw. They raised £100,000 in 24 hours to bring the play to the London theatre. In 2001, the Steppenwolf Theatre Company produced a Broadway revival, winning the Tony Award for Best Play Revival. This production was directed by Terry Kinney and starred Gary Sinise, Amy Morton, Tim Sampson (playing Chief, his father Will Sampson's role in the film version), Eric Johner, and Ross Lehman.

In 2004, Guy Masterson and Nica Burns mounted a production at the Edinburgh Fringe Festival with Christian Slater, Mackenzie Crook and Frances Barber and a cast of comedians including Owen O'Neill. Masterson famously resigned as director & co-producer just prior to opening citing "ill health" and the production was finally delivered by Terry Johnson and Tamara Harvey. The show was a huge box office hit and transferred to London's Gielgud Theatre where it ran for over 20 weeks. This production was itself revived in 2006 with Alex Kingston taking over the role of Nurse Ratched. It then toured the UK in 2007 with Shane Richie playing McMurphy and Sophie Ward as Nurse Ratched.

A production of the play was staged by London's Tower Theatre Company from 23 to 27 October 2012 at Upstairs at the Gatehouse, Highgate, London. In 2018, After Hours Theatre Company in Los Angeles created an immersive version of the work. The Oregon State Hospital was recreated in a 7,000 sq. ft. warehouse in Burbank. Each audience member was provided a costume and a patient wristband. During the immersive pre-show, audience members were tasked with finding clues as to why they have been admitted to the hospital that eventually led them to join the patient revolution. This production was nominated for six Ovation Awards, including a win for Best Lighting Design, Intimate Theatre.

In 2022, an Australian adaptation of Dale Wasserman's play, directed by Chris McRae was created by Luke Miller, McRae and Samuel Yombich Pilot-Kickett, and performed by Darlington Theatre Players in Perth, Western Australia. The adaptation recontextualised the play to 1960s Australia, with the reimagining of the "Chief" Bromden character as a local Aboriginal man, as well as some adjustment of language to fit the Australian idiom. The production included musical composition by Kieran Ridgway, with the inclusion of didgeridoo and didgeribone as part of the underscoring to reflect the new setting.

A new production of the play directed by Clint Dyer and starring Aaron Pierre and Giles Terera is set to open at the Old Vic Theatre in London in April 2026.

== Awards and nominations ==
=== 2001 Broadway revival ===
Year	Award	Category	Nominee	Result
2001	Tony Award	Best Revival of a Play		Won
2001	Tony Award	Best Performance by a Leading Actor in a Play	Gary Sinise	Nominated
2001	Drama Desk Award	Outstanding Revival of a Play		Nominated
2001	Outer Critics Circle Award	Outstanding Revival of a Play		Won
2001	Drama League Award	Distinguished Production of a Revival		Won

== See also ==
- One Flew Over the Cuckoo's Nest (novel)
- One Flew Over the Cuckoo's Nest (film)
