= Animals Are Like That =

1939 Frank Buck book

Animals Are Like That!
- first edition cover (1939)
- Author: Frank Buck; Carol Weld
- Language: English
- Publisher: Robert M. McBride
- Publication date: 1939
- Publication place: United States
- Media type: Print (Hardback)
- Pages: 240
- Preceded by: On Jungle Trails
- Followed by: All In A Lifetime

Animals Are Like That! (1939) was Frank Buck's sixth book, which continued his stories of capturing exotic animals. Animals Are Like That! has entered the public domain in the United States and the full text is available online at HathiTrust.

If you should find yourself with a monkey or ape on your hands and no knowledge of what to do with it, Buck told co-author Carol Weld, just treat it like a child. And the elephant, like a man in the tropics, needs a sheltered siesta in mid-afternoon because he is susceptible to sunstroke. Monkeys pick up human ways and copy them. But you should never, never trust a tiger, any more than you should trust a crocodile.

== Critical reception ==
"Buck describes the animals in their native haunts, the capture of some of them, their characteristics, and their reactions in captivity...filled with adventure and odd bits of animal lore." Booklist 36:170 Jan 1, 1940

"The vast legion of Frank Buck's followers will find Animals Are Like That thoroughly enjoyable and instructive reading. When the author doesn't know the answer to some more intangible animal trait he frankly admits his deficiency; but this happens infrequently. Mr. Buck has selected a large number of excellent illustrations..." Springfield Republican p10 Nov 29, 1939

"A fascinating study of animal traits." The Montreal Gazette - Dec 9, 1939
