= Joan Tetzel =

American actress

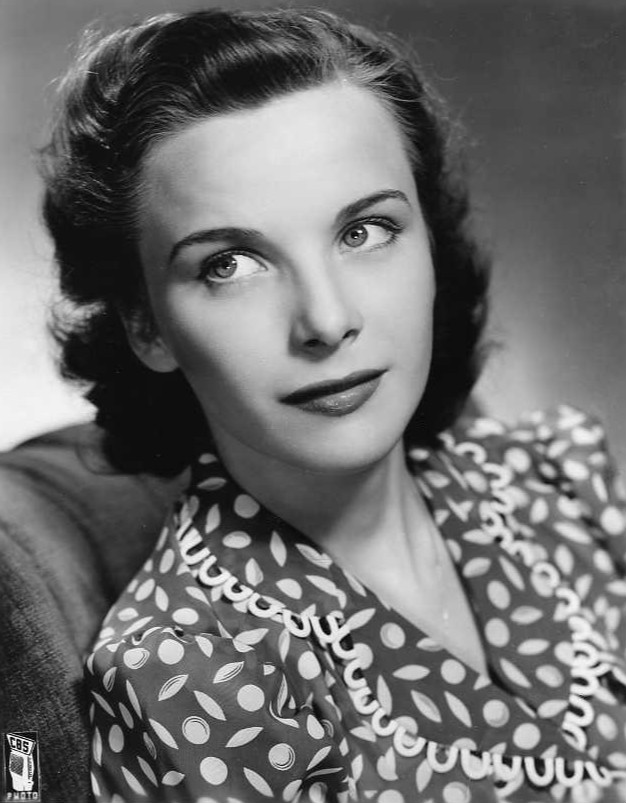
- Tetzel, circa 1940s
- Born: Joan Margaret Tetzel; June 21, 1921; New York City, U.S.
- Died: October 31, 1977 (aged 56); Fairwarp, Sussex, England
- Occupation: Actress
- Years active: 1946–1976
- Spouses: John E. Mosman (m. 1940; div. 1947) Oskar Homolka (m. 1949)

Joan Margaret Tetzel (June 21, 1921 – October 31, 1977) was an American actress.

== Early years ==
Tetzel was born in New York City and grew up in the Spuyten Duyvil section of the Bronx. Her father, an illustrator, was Austrian, and her mother was Scottish-Canadian. Tetzel posed for her father when she was a child.

== Career ==
Tetzel signed a contract with David O. Selznick in 1942. Programs for her stage appearances included the line "Miss Tetzel appears through the courtesy of David O. Selznick." to ward off casting agents and talent scouts.

=== Radio ===
Tetzel's acting debut occurred on a children's radio program when she was 13. She played in When a Girl Marries and Woman of Courage, both on CBS.

=== Film ===
Tetzel's film debut was in Duel in the Sun (1946). She also performed in Alfred Hitchcock's The Paradine Case (1947), in which she played "Judy Flaquer", the daughter of the solicitor played by Charles Coburn in the film. In the movie, she is the confidante and best friend of the wife (Ann Todd) of defense lawyer Anthony Keane (Gregory Peck), and is able to objectively see how Keane is ruining his marriage because of his infatuation with Mrs. Paradine (Alida Valli). Her other film appearances included The File on Thelma Jordon (1950), Hell Below Zero (1954) and Joy in the Morning (1965).

=== Television ===
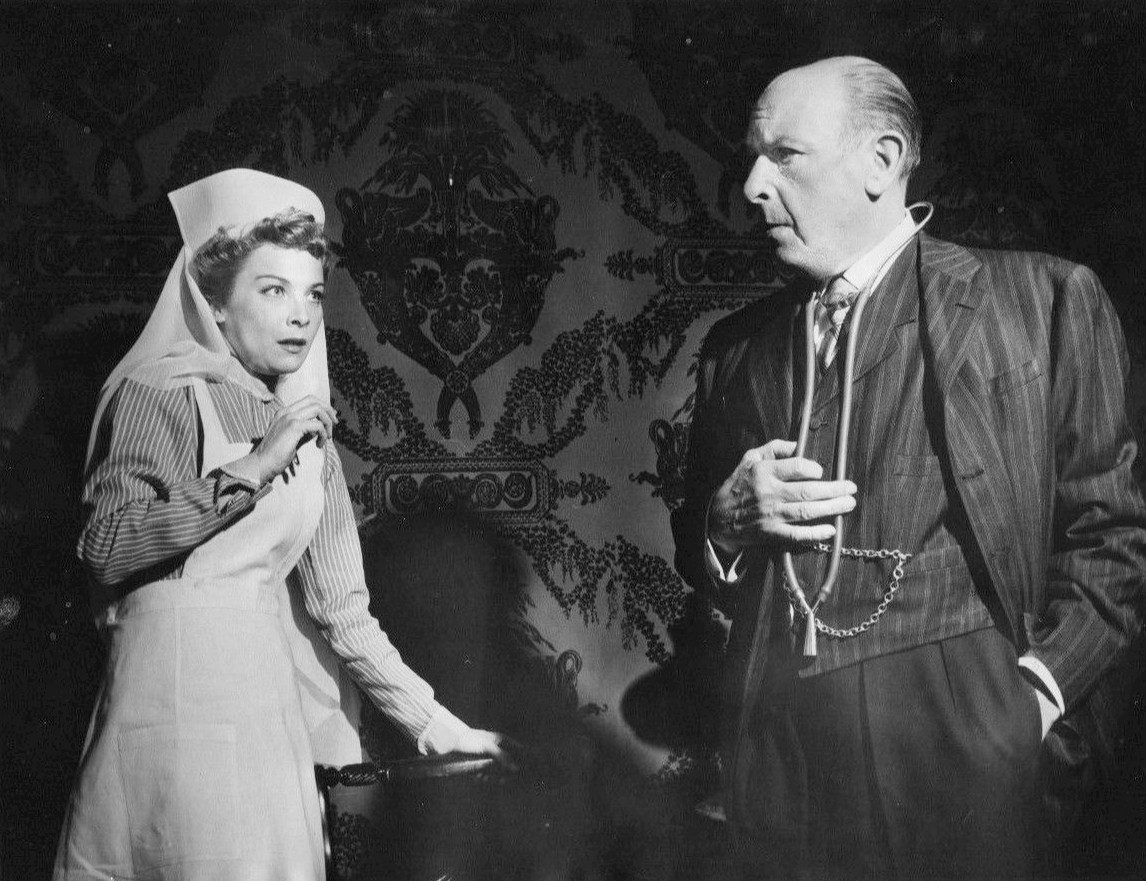
Tetzel with Sir Cedric Hardwicke in the Climax! presentation of "Strange Death at Burnleigh", 1957

Tetzel also worked with Alfred Hitchcock in his TV series Alfred Hitchcock Presents. She played "Eve Ross" in the Alfred Hitchcock Presents episode "Guest for Breakfast". In 1963, she appeared as Marian Stuart, wife of the title character, in Perry Mason's, "The Case of the Decadent Dean." Tetzel also made appearances on Thriller ("An Attractive Family" and "The Devil's Ticket") and Gunsmoke.

=== Theater ===
Tetzel's stage debut came in Lorelei (1938) at the Longacre Theatre in New York City. She appeared in the 1940 revival of Liliom, the original stage production of I Remember Mama, and portrayed Nurse Ratched in the stage production of One Flew Over the Cuckoo's Nest on Broadway. As a noted stage actress, her photo appeared on the front cover of Life Magazine on Monday 16 February 1948.

Tetzel's other Broadway credits include The Winner (1953), Red Gloves (1948), Strange Bedfellows (1947), Pretty Little Parlor (1943), Peepshow (1943), Harriet (1942), The Damask Cheek (1942), and The Happy Days (1940). She also acted in London, portraying Fionna Foster in How the Other Half Loves (1970).

== Marriages ==
Her first husband was radio producer John E. Mosman. Her second husband was Oscar Homolka (1898–1978), whom she married in 1949. They remained wed until her death.

== Death ==
Tetzel died October 31, 1977, at her home Beri-Be-Dahn, Fairwarp, Sussex, England, aged 56, from cancer and pneumonia.

== Partial filmography ==
- Duel in the Sun (1946) - Helen Langford
- The Paradine Case (1947) - Judy Flaquer
- The File on Thelma Jordon (1950) - Pamela Blackwell Marshall
- Hell Below Zero (1954) - Judie Nordhal
- The Red Dress (1954) - Pandora (segment "Meet Mr. Jones' story)
- Gunsmoke (1957) (Season 2 Episode 39: "Jealousy") - Tilda Durbin
- Alfred Hitchcock Presents (1958) (Season 3 Episode 21: "Guest for Breakfast") - Eve Ross
- Joy in the Morning (1965) - Beverly Karter
