= Gigi Parrish =

American actress (1912–2006)

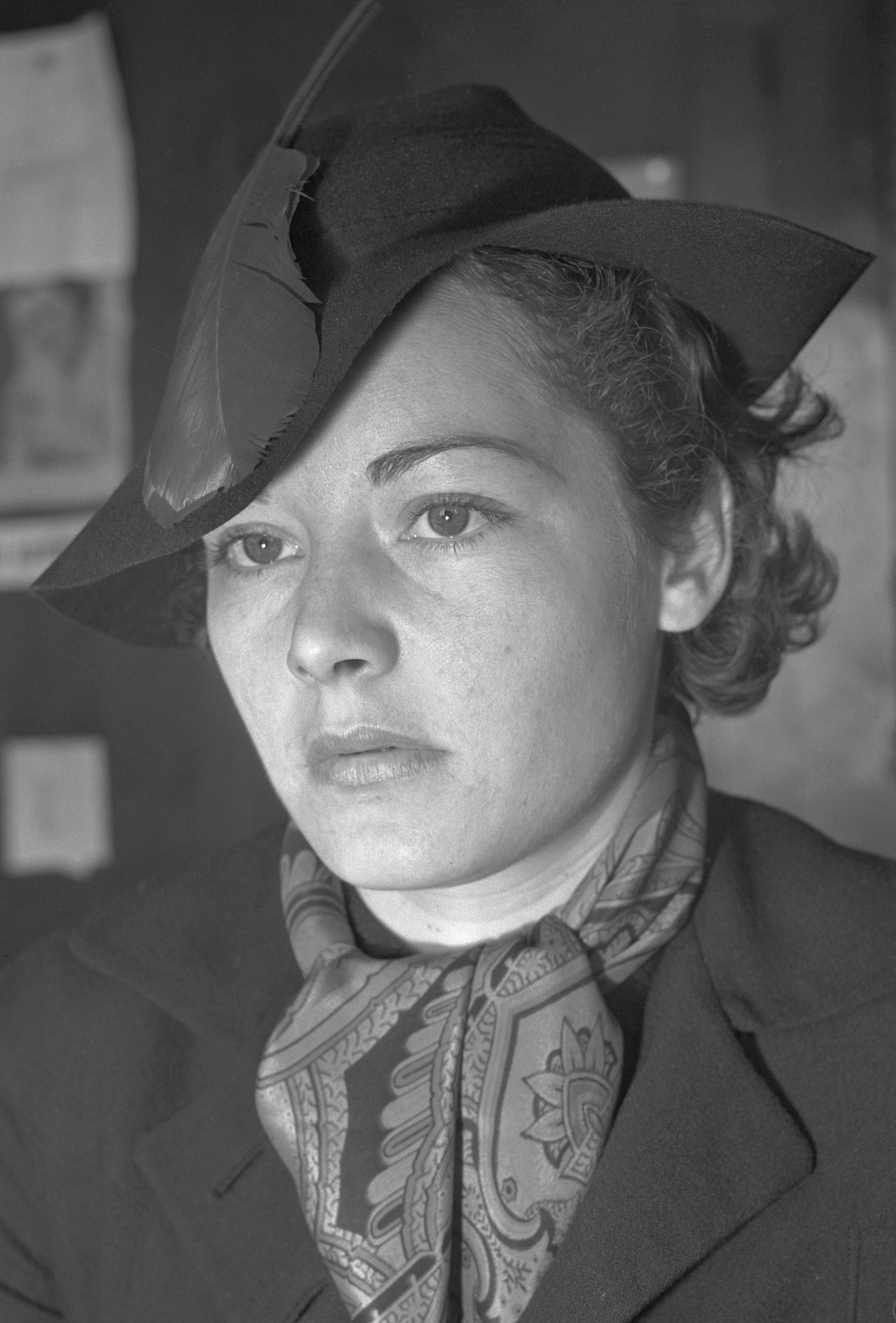
- Gigi Parrish (1935)
- Born: Katherine Gertrude McElroy; August 30, 1912; Cambridge, Massachusetts, U.S.
- Died: February 8, 2006 (aged 93); Dana Point, California, U.S.
- Other names: Gertrude McElroy; Katherine Weld
- Occupation: Actress
- Years active: 1933–1937
- Spouses: Dillwyn Parrish (m. 1928; div. 1936); John Weld (m. 1937; died 2003)

Gigi Parrish (born Katherine Gertrude McElroy; August 30, 1912 – February 8, 2006) was an American film actress who had a short career beginning in 1933, appearing only in nine films before retiring in 1937.

== Early life ==
She was born in Cambridge, Massachusetts, as Katherine Gertrude McElroy and raised in Hartford, Connecticut. Her mother died in 1918, and McElroy and her siblings were put up for adoption. After adoption by a wealthy family, she and her step-siblings were tutored by author Dillwyn Parrish. Although he was eighteen years her senior, the two fell in love, and at the age of fifteen she married Parrish, under the name Gertrude McElroy. For their honeymoon, she and her husband started out on motorcycles from his family's home in Claymont, Delaware, intending to drive across the country to California. Parrish was severely injured in an accident in the Southwestern United States and, once she was physically able, they completed the remainder of the journey via train.

== Career ==
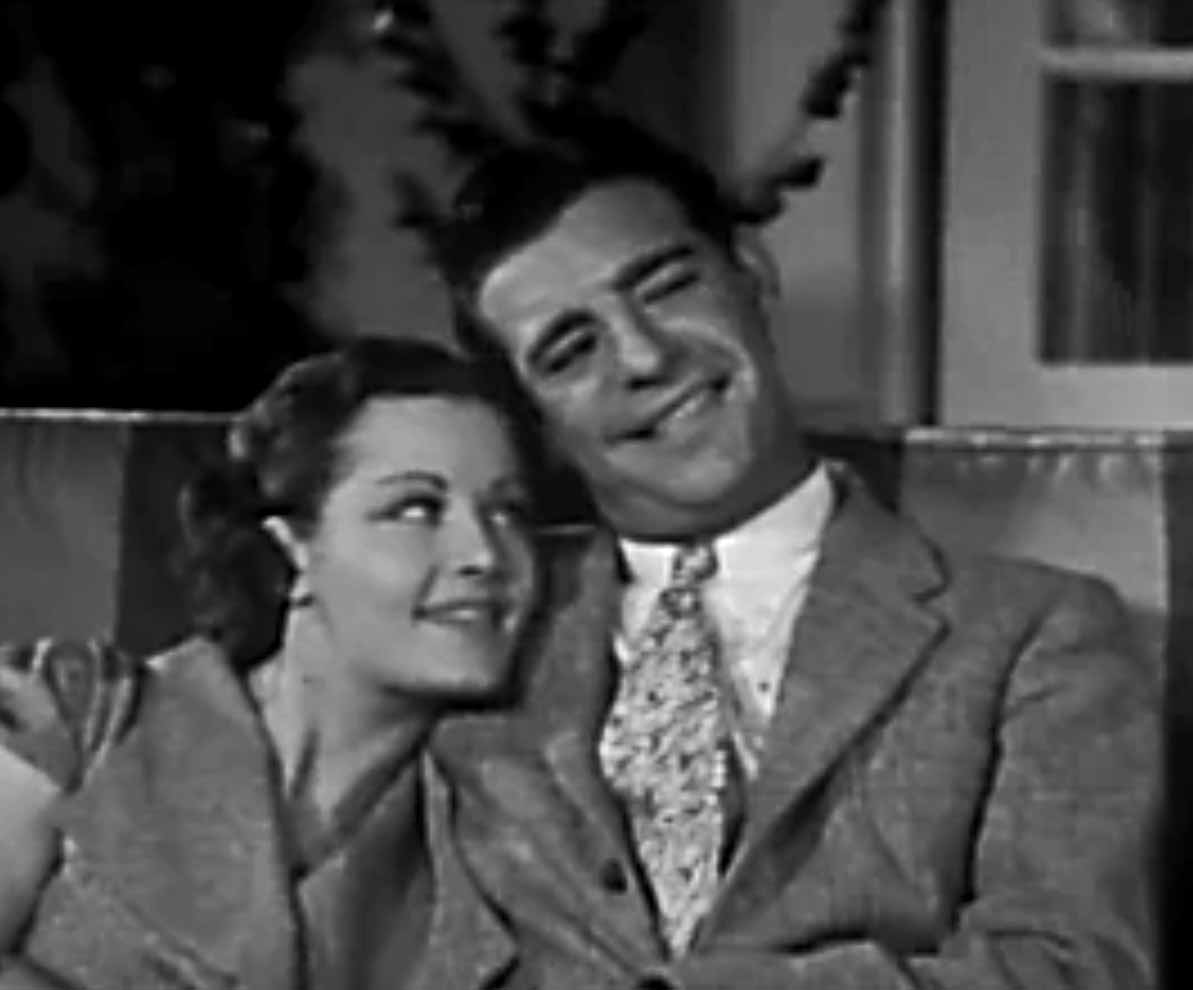
Gigi Parrish and Lon Chaney Jr., in Girl o' My Dreams (1934)

In 1929, she and her husband moved permanently to California, where, a few years later, Parrish was signed to a contract with Samuel Goldwyn's motion picture company. In 1933 she made her film debut in Roman Scandals, starring Eddie Cantor and Gloria Stuart. Parrish became a "WAMPAS Baby Star", touring the country to promote motion pictures through the Shriners sponsorship. In 1934 she appeared in secondary roles in six more films.

== Personal life ==
Gigi and Dillwyn Parrish rented a beach house in Laguna Beach, next door to Mary Frances Kennedy Fisher and her husband Alfred Fisher, with whom they became good friends. Her husband fell in love with Mary Fisher at a point when the marriage was already in difficulty. By the time both couples divorced, Parrish had already fallen in love with journalist and screenwriter John Weld (1905–2003).

After appearing in nine films, she gave up her acting career and married Weld in 1937. From 1949 to 1965 she and her husband published The Laguna Beach Post, at which time she was known as Katherine Weld.

== Death ==
Her husband John Weld died in 2003 in Dana Point, California, aged 98, after 66 years of marriage. Parrish died three years later, aged 93.
