= Johnny Stearns =

American actor (1916–2001)

- Born: October 13, 1916; Billerica, Massachusetts, U.S.
- Died: December 1, 2001 (aged 85); Newport Beach, California, U.S.
- Occupations: Actor, director, producer
- Years active: 1947–2001
- Known for: Mary Kay and Johnny
- Spouse: Mary Kay Stearns (m. 1946)
- Children: 3

John Stearns (October 13, 1916 – December 1, 2001) was an American actor, producer and director, active from the 1940s until the 2000s. He also performed in several Broadway plays.

Stearns was best known for co-starring with his wife Mary Kay Stearns on television's first sitcom, Mary Kay and Johnny. He was also known as one of the original producers of The Tonight Show Starring Steve Allen and Arthur Murray's Dance Party. For nearly 30 years, he was the host and producer of the public affairs television program Agriculture USA.

== Biography ==
=== Early life ===
Stearns was born on October 13, 1916, in Billerica, Massachusetts to father Frederick Stearns and mother Edith Louise Bond (February 14, 1884–November 16, 1961). His mother was the founder of the Peterborough Players, a summer theater troupe in Peterborough, New Hampshire in which he was a member. Stearns had two older sisters; Isabell and Sally.

=== Stage ===
Stearns' career began as a stage performer at the age of 14 at the Mariarden Theater in Peterborough, NH.

Soon after his engagement at Mariarden ended, he went to Broadway. His first Broadway performance was in the production of the play Night Music. He also was in the musicals One Touch of Venus with Mary Martin in 1943, On the Town in 1944 and Are You With It? in 1945.

=== Television ===
In 1947, Stearns and his wife Mary Kay whom he married the previous year, began doing a television show entitled Mary Kay and Johnny. The two played fictional versions of themselves; a newlywed couple living in an apartment in New York City trying to make it in life. The series was the first sitcom broadcast on television, the first to show a couple sharing a bed and the first to feature a pregnancy; the Stearns' real life son Christopher (born 1948). The Stearns' created the show and wrote all the scripts. The series originally aired on DuMont premiering on November 18, 1947, but moved to NBC then moved to CBS then back to NBC where it finished its run on March 11, 1950.

After Mary Kay, Stearns went on to produce the Steve Allen version of The Tonight Show which ran on NBC from 1954–1957 and Arthur Murray's Dance Party in the 1950s. Starting in 1961, he began hosting and producing Agriculture USA, a public affairs program. It aired on NBC until 1990 when it began airing in syndication. He made his last appearance on the program's last episode in 2001 just days before he died.

=== Personal life and death ===
Stearns married actress Mary Kay Jones in 1946. They had three children together and were married for 55 years until Stearns died. Stearns died on December 1, 2001, in Newport Beach, California at the Hoag Memorial Hospital from complications of a fall at the age of 85.

== Filmography ==
=== Actor ===
- Boomerang! (1947) (Reverend Gardiner; uncredited)
- Kiss of Death (1947) (Harris; uncredited)
- Mary Kay and Johnny (1947–1950) (Himself; all 300 episodes)

=== Producer ===
- Tonight Starring Steve Allen (1954–1957)
- Make Me Laugh (original 1958 version)
- 32nd Academy Awards (1960)
- Agriculture USA (1961–2001)

=== Director ===
- Make Me Laugh (original 1958 version)

== Stage work ==
- Night Music (1930)
- One Touch of Venus (1943)
- On the Town (1944)
- Are You With It? (1945)
