= Ingrid Torrance =

Canadian actress

- Born: 1969 (age 56–57); British Columbia, Canada
- Occupations: Actor, coach
- Years active: 1994–present
- Website: http://www.ingridtorrance.com/

Ingrid Torrance (born 1969 in British Columbia) is a Canadian actor best known for her role as a spokesperson on NBCi.com.

She is a Canadian actor, acting instructor and author. She has been a television and movie actor since 1994, an acting teacher since 1995, and a coach since 1998. Ingrid is a voting member of the American Academy of Motion Pictures. In 1998, she was nominated as Best Actress for a Leo Award and in March, 2001, she was featured in Entertainment Weekly as a "Breakout" Actress.

== Filmography ==
=== Actor ===
Year	Title	Role	Notes
1994	Robin’s Hood	Marissa Chaplin	1 episode
1996	Big Bully	Fourth Grade Teacher	movie
1996	Poltergeist: The Legacy	Party Girl	1 episode
1996	The Sentinel	Calli	1 episode
1996	Viper	Wallace	1 episode
1997	Contagious	Young Brunette Nurse	movie
1997	The Accident: A Moment of Truth Movie	Nurse	movie
1998	Police Academy: The Series	Carla	1 episode
1998	The Inspectors	Inspector	movie
1998	First Wave	Mary	1 episode
1998	Cold Squad		1 episode
1998	Act of War	Katerina Mirova	movie
1999	The Net	Hotel Desk Clerk	1 episode
1999	The Outer Limits	Becky	episode: Small Friends
1999	Heaven’s Fire	Terrel Phillips	movie
1999	Double Jeopardy	Maison Beau Coeur Clerk	movie
1999	Seven Days	Joni Bartlett	1 episode
2000	A Storm in Summer	Harriet	movie
2000	Higher Ground	Chloe Scarbrow	4 episodes
2000	Miracle on the Mountain: The Kincaid Family Story	Alexis	movie
2000	Hollywood Off-Ramp		1 episode
2000	The Wednesday Woman	Martha Sullivan	movie
2000	The Linda McCartney Story	Galley Patron	TV movie
2000	Christy: The Movie	Fairlight Spencer	movie
2000	Sole Survivor	Michelle Carpenter	movie
2000	Becoming Dick	Lily	movie
2000–2001	NBCi.com	Spokesperson	
2001	Christy, Choices of the Heart, Part II: A New Beginning	Fairlight Spencer	2 episodes
2002	The Sausage Factory	Dane	1 episode
2002	John Doe	Head Flight Attendant	1 episode
2002	Cheats	Marla	
2002	L.A. Law: The Movie	Lara Becker	
2002	The Chris Isaak Show	Vickie Wister	1 episode
2002	Andromeda	Duran	1 episode
2003	Smallville	Wedding Planner	
2003	Behind the Camera: The Unauthorized Story of Three's Company	Mary Cadorette / Vicky Bradford	movie
2004	Scooby Doo 2: Monsters Unleashed	Reporter #3	movie
2004	Andromeda	Sakkai Saguro	1 episode
2004	A Very Cool Christmas	Michelle	movie
2004	Dead Like Me	Macy	1 episode
2004	Stargate SG-1	Staffer	1 episode
2004–2005	The 4400	Lucy	6 episodes
2005	Criminal Intent	Angela Major	
2006	Home by Christmas	Madeleine Francis	
2006	Under the Mistletoe	Diane Holmes	
2006	Blade: The Series	Trooper Sharon Hirsch	2 episodes
2006	Circumference	Elizabeth	
2006	Godiva’s	Trish	1 episode
2006	Da Vinci’s City Hall	Elaine Matthews	2 episodes
2006	Flight 93	Cleveland Controller #2	TV movie
2007	Numb	Female Psychologist	movie
2008	Robson Arms	Alex	
2008	Supernatural	Mrs. Waters	1 episode
2008	Impulse	Melissa	
2008	The Auburn Hills Breakdown	Louise	
2008	Incident at a Truckstop Diner	Waitress	
2009	Fringe	Elizabeth Jarvis	1 episode
2009	The Good Wife (Pilot)	Dr. Torrance	1 episode
2009	Killer Hair	Client #1	movie
2009	Driven to Kill	Detective Norden	movie
2010	Elopement	Melanie	movie
2011	R.L. Stine's The Haunting Hour	Mom	1 episode
2012–2018	Once Upon a Time	Nurse Ratched	12 episodes

=== Actor Coach ===
Year	Title	Starring	Notes
2004–2005	The 4400	Karina Lombard	movie
2006	Men in Trees	Greyson Golka	movie
2007	The Assistants		4 episodes
2007	They Wait	Regan Ory, Cheng Pei-pei, Henry O	movie
2008	Samurai Girl	Stacy Keibler	movie
2008	Paparazzi Princess		movie
2009	Christmas in Canaan		movie
2009	Life Unexpected	Rafi Gavron	movie

=== Director ===
Year	Title	Note
2009	Misplaced	Short film

=== Associate Producer ===
Year	Title	Note
2009	Daysleeper	Short film

=== Casting Director ===
Year	Film	Director	Notes
2009	Daysleeper	Daniel Dimarco	TV short film

== Author ==
Year	Title	Publishing Company
2010	Act! a step by step guide to starting your acting career	Eloquent Books
