= Mary Kay and Johnny =

American situation comedy

- Genre: Sitcom
- Created by: Mary Kay Stearns; Johnny Stearns
- Starring: Mary Kay Stearns; Johnny Stearns; Howard Thomas; Nydia Westman; Christopher William Stearns
- Country of origin: United States
- Original language: English
- No. of episodes: 300 (estimate)

Production
- Camera setup: Multi-camera
- Running time: 15 mins (12 minus ads). (1947-1948; 1949); 30 mins. (25 minus ads) (1948-1949; 1950)

Original release
- Network: DuMont (1947-1948); CBS (1949); NBC (1948-1949; 1949-1950)
- Release: November 18, 1947 – March 11, 1950

Mary Kay and Johnny is an American sitcom starring real-life married couple Mary Kay and Johnny Stearns. It was the first sitcom broadcast on a television network in the United States. Mary Kay and Johnny initially aired live on the DuMont Television Network before moving to CBS and then NBC.

== Format ==
Plots centered around a bank employee and his "zany, but not dumb" wife and the problems that they encountered. Much of the activity occurred in the couple's apartment in Greenwich Village.

The March 6, 1948, issue of the trade publication Billboard gave a mostly favorable review, "This program comes close to being a model tele[vision] show. In detailing the adventures, mainly domestic, of a young married couple, Johnny and Mary Kay Stearns have come up with charming and fresh material, which always takes into consideration that there are cameras taking everything in," although the column's author objected to the show's usage of familiar sitcom tropes such as "the dreary old tolerant-husband-with-a-dumb-wife pattern."

== Cast ==
In addition to the Stearnses, the cast included their son, Christopher Stearns, as himself. Mary Kay's mother was played by Nydia Westman, and Johnny's friend Howie was played by Howard Thomas. Jim Stevenson was the announcer.

== Broadcast history ==
The first 15-minute episode debuted on the DuMont Television Network on Tuesday, November 18, 1947. The Stearnses created and wrote all the scripts. The program was broadcast live, most of the action taking place on a set representing the New York City apartment of the title characters, a young married couple.

Mary Kay and Johnny was the first program to show a couple sharing a bed, and the first series to show a woman's pregnancy on television: Mary Kay became pregnant in 1948 and after unsuccessfully trying to hide her pregnancy, the producers wrote it into the show. On December 31, 1948, the Stearns' weeks-old son Christopher appeared on the show and became a character.

After a year on DuMont, the show moved to CBS for half a year, much of the time being broadcast every weeknight, then ran for another year each Saturday night on NBC, where it debuted on October 10, 1948. It broadcast the final episode on March 11, 1950.

== Viewership ==
At a time when there were no TV ratings (the A.C. Nielsen Company would not begin measuring TV ratings until 1950), Anacin decided to take a chance and sponsor the show. This decision worried the advertising executives at Anacin, who thought that they might be wasting money by sponsoring a show with a sparse audience. A simple, non-scientific scheme to gauge the size of the audience was hatched. During one commercial spot, Anacin offered a free pocket mirror to the first 200 viewers who wrote in requesting one. As a precaution, they purchased a total of 400 mirrors in case the audience was twice as large as they expected. Although the free mirror was offered only during that one spot, Anacin received nearly 9000 requests for mirrors.

== Episode status ==
DuMont's corporate successor, Metromedia, disposed of what was left of the DuMont archive in the East River. (Note: Ed McMahon, David C. Fisher, in their book When Television Was Young: The Inside Story with Memories by Legends of the Small Screen, wrote, "Unfortunately, these kinescopes survived only until the 1970s when ABC dumped all the old DuMont programs into the New York Bay and CBS trashed its own old kinescopes.")

The fate of the NBC episodes is unknown, although they also were known to have been getting rid of their older recordings in the early 1970s and disposing the ones they could not get the stars of the shows to take. The Paley Center for Media has one 1949 episode in its collection. TV Land used a clip of Mary Kay and Johnny in an episode of Inside TV Land called "Taboo TV". However, this clip showed a scene of Mary Kay and Johnny together in a bed; the single episode held by The Paley Center for Media does not feature such a scene, so that would indicate at least one more episode survives.

== See also ==
- List of programs broadcast by the DuMont Television Network
- List of surviving DuMont Television Network broadcasts

== Bibliography ==
- David Weinstein, The Forgotten Network: DuMont and the Birth of American Television (Philadelphia: Temple University Press, 2004) ISBN 1-59213-245-6
- Alex McNeil, Total Television, Fourth edition (New York: Penguin Books, 1980) ISBN 0-14-024916-8
- Tim Brooks and Earle Marsh, The Complete Directory to Prime Time Network TV Shows, Third edition (New York: Ballantine Books, 1964) ISBN 0-345-31864-1
