= Mary Kay Stearns =

American actress

- Born: Mary Katherine Jones; October 27, 1925; Glendale, California, U.S.
- Died: November 17, 2018 (aged 93); Newport Beach, California, U.S.
- Occupation: Actress
- Years active: 1928–1952, 2002
- Spouse: Johnny Stearns (m. 1946; died 2001)

Mary Katherine Stearns (née Jones; October 27, 1925 – November 17, 2018) was an American actress best known for portraying the fictional version of herself on the sitcom Mary Kay and Johnny from 1947 until 1950.

== Career ==
Stearns's career began at the age of 2 and a half as an actress and singer at the Pasadena Playhouse in Pasadena, California. She also appeared in several films before going to Broadway. She had a supporting role in the hit comedy Strange Bedfellows, which ran on Broadway from January through July 1948, for 229 performances.

In 1947, Stearns, who looked young for her age, was offered a job as a fashion model for an early home shopping television program. On the advice of her newlywed husband Johnny, who thought the idea to be weak, she refused; Johnny suggested to the broadcaster that she instead host a domestic sitcom with him. On November 18, the DuMont Television Network debuted a new show starring the two entitled Mary Kay and Johnny. The series had the Stearnses playing fictional versions of themselves. On the show the pair portrayed a newlywed couple, also named Mary Kay and Johnny Stearns, who were trying to make it in New York. Most of the episodes took place in an apartment complex in Greenwich Village, New York. Mary Kay's counterpart was an everyday, run-of-the-mill, zany housewife and Johnny's counterpart was a bank employee. The series moved from DuMont to NBC in 1948 then to CBS then back to NBC where it finished its run in March 1950.

Mary Kay and Johnny also achieved some firsts during its run. The series was the first sitcom to air on television, contrary to popular belief that I Love Lucy which premiered four years later was the first. It was also the first television series to feature a pregnancy, (the Stearnses' real life son Christopher), whose birth and character were written in the show in December 1948. It was also the first to feature a couple sharing a bed.

After the show ended, the Stearnses moved to California where Johnny pursued a career in production. Mary Kay, did a nightly television series by herself entitled Mary Kay's Nightcap which aired on NBC during the 1951-52 television season. She also had guest star appearances on Armstrong Circle Theatre and Kraft Television Theatre. She and her husband also had a seven-year stint as the spokespeople for U.S. Steel. She later stated that she never was particularly fond of television and largely did those shows as a means to earn a paycheck while she tried to make it big on Broadway.

== Personal life ==
Stearns was married to actor and producer Johnny Stearns. They married in 1946 and she was widowed on December 16, 2001, when Johnny died at the age of 85. They had three children together; Christopher, Jonathan and Melinda. Stearns also has one grandson. She died in Newport Beach, California, on November 17, 2018, at the age of 93, with her death not reported until two months later.

== Filmography ==
- Our Hearts Were Growing Up (1946) (schoolgirl; uncredited)
- Mary Kay and Johnny (1947–1950) (Herself; approximately 300 episodes)
- Armstrong Circle Theatre (1951; one episode)
- Kraft Television Theatre (1952; one episode)
- Inside TV Land: Taboo TV (2002 television documentary)
