= John Weld (writer) =

American journalist

- John Weld
- Born: February 24, 1905; Birmingham, Alabama
- Died: June 14, 2003 (aged 98); Monarch Beach, Dana Point, California
- Occupations: Journalist, writer
- Spouses: Carol Weld (m. 1927–1932); Gigi Parrish (m. 1937)

John Weld (February 24, 1905 – June 14, 2003) was an American newspaper reporter and writer.

Weld was born in Birmingham, Alabama. He had an early career in Hollywood in the 1920s as a stunt double for Tom Mix, Buck Jones and other stars. He wrote about those days in his 1991 book Fly Away Home: Memoirs of a Hollywood Stunt Man.

During the late 1920s Weld was a reporter for the New York Herald Tribune in Paris and the New York American and New York World in New York City.

He was married to the journalist and writer Carol Weld from 1927 to 1932.

Among Weld's books are Don't You Cry for Me, a 1940 novel based on the Donner Party; the autobiographical Young Man in Paris (1985); and September Song, a 1998 biography of his friend, actor Walter Huston.

Weld wrote screenplays for Columbia and Universal; served as director of publications for the Ford Motor Co. in Dearborn, Michigan, and owned Ford dealerships in Laguna and San Clemente, California. He co-published the Laguna Beach Post with his second wife, Katy. He died in Monarch Beach, Dana Point, California.

== Bibliography ==
- John Weld. Young Man in Paris. Academy Chicago Pub, 1985.
- John Weld. Fly Away Home: Memoirs of a Hollywood Stuntman. Mission Publishing Company. Santa Barbara, California, U.S.A., 1991.
- John Weld. The missionary: A novel of the early Southwest. Northwoods Press, 1981.
- John Weld. September Song. An intimate biography of Walter Huston. The Scarecrow Press, Inc., 1998.
- John Weld. The pardners: A novel of the California gold rush. Charles Scribner's Sons. New York 1941.
- John Weld. Sabbath Has No End. A Novel Of Negro Slavery. Scribner. New York, 1942.
- John Weld. Laguna, I Love You: The Best of Our Town. Fithian Press, Santa Barbara, California, U.S.A., 1996.
- John Weld. Mark Pfeiffer, M.D. Charles Scribner's Sons, New York, 1943.
- John Weld. Don't You Cry for Me. Charles Scribner's Sons, New York, 1940.
- John Weld. Gun Girl. Robert M. McBride & Co., NY, 1932.
- John Weld. Stunt Man. Robert M. McBride & Co., NY, 1932.
