= List of horror films of the 1940s =

A list of horror films released in the 1940s. After the success of Son of Frankenstein (1939), Universal horror caught a second wind and horror films continued to be produced at a feverish pace into the mid-1940s. The early 1940s saw the debut of Lon Chaney Jr. and "The Wolf Man", both of which became fixtures in the Universal landscape. Meanwhile, Count Dracula and Frankenstein's monster appeared in numerous sequels, often together in what was colloquially called "monster rally" films.

Hoping to present a viable alternative to the Universal juggernaut, RKO decided to embark on a series of its own horror films, starting with Cat People in 1942. Led by producer Val Lewton and director Jacques Tourneur, this critically acclaimed series focused less on visible horrors and more on the psychological aspects of fear.

== List ==
Horror films released in the 1940s
Title	Director	Cast	Country	Notes
1940
The Ape	William Nigh	Boris Karloff, Maris Wrixon	United States	
Before I Hang	Nick Grinde	Boris Karloff, Evelyn Keyes, Bruce Bennett	United States	
Black Friday	Arthur Lubin	Boris Karloff, Bela Lugosi, Stanley Ridges	United States	
The Devil Bat	Jean Yarbrough	Bela Lugosi, Suzanne Kaaren, Dave O'Brien	United States	
The Door with Seven Locks	Norman Lee	Leslie Banks, Lilli Palmer, Romilly Lunge	United Kingdom	
Dr. Cyclops	Ernest B. Schoedsack	Albert Dekker, Thomas Coley, Janice Logan	United States	
The Ghost Breakers	George Marshall	Bob Hope, Paulette Goddard, Willie Best, Richard Carlson	United States	
The Invisible Man Returns	Joe May	Cedric Hardwicke, Vincent Price, Nan Grey	United States	
Island of Doomed Men	Charles Barton	Peter Lorre, Rochelle Hudson, Robert Wilcox	United States	
The Man with Nine Lives	Nick Grinde	Boris Karloff, Roger Pryor, Jo Ann Sayers, Stanley Brown	United States	
The Mummy's Hand	William Christy Cabanne	Dick Foran, Peggy Moran, Wallace Ford	United States	
Son of Ingagi	Richard Kahn	Zack Williams, Laura Bowman, Spencer Williams	United States	
You'll Find Out	David Butler	Kay Kyser, Peter Lorre, Boris Karloff, Bela Lugosi	United States	
1941
The Black Cat	Albert Rogell	Basil Rathbone, Hugh Herbert, Broderick Crawford, Bela Lugosi, Gale Sondergaard	United States	
The Devil Commands	Edward Dmytryk	Boris Karloff, Richard Fiske, Amanda Duff	United States	
Dr. Jekyll and Mr. Hyde	Victor Fleming	Spencer Tracy, Ingrid Bergman, Lana Turner	United States	
The Face Behind the Mask	Robert Florey	Peter Lorre, Evelyn Keyes, Don Beddoe	United States	
Horror Island	George Waggner	Dick Foran, Leo Carrillo, Peggy Moran	United States	
Invisible Ghost	Joseph H. Lewis	Bela Lugosi, Polly Ann Young, John McGuire	United States	
King of the Zombies	Jean Yarbrough	Joan Woodbury, Dick Purcell, Mantan Moreland	United States	
Man Made Monster	George Waggner	Lionel Atwill, Lon Chaney Jr., Anne Nagel	United States	
The Monster and the Girl	Stuart Heisler	Ellen Drew, Robert Paige, Paul Lukas	United States	
Spooks Run Wild	Phil Rosen	Bela Lugosi, Leo Gorcey, Huntz Hall, Bobby Jordan	United States	
The Wolf Man	George Waggner	Lon Chaney Jr., Warren William, Claude Rains, Ralph Bellamy, Evelyn Ankers	United States	
1942
The Boogie Man Will Get You	Lew Landers	Boris Karloff, Peter Lorre, Jeff Donnell	United States	
Cat People	Jacques Tourneur	Simone Simon, Kent Smith, Tom Conway, Jane Randolph	United States	
The Corpse Vanishes	Wallace W. Fox	Bela Lugosi, Luana Walters, Tristram Coffin	United States	
Dr. Renault's Secret	Harry Lachman	J. Carrol Naish, John Shepperd, Lynne Roberts, George Zucco	United States	
The Ghost of Frankenstein	Erle C. Kenton	Lon Chaney Jr., Cedric Hardwicke, Ralph Bellamy, Lionel Atwill, Bela Lugosi	United States	
A Light in the Window	Manuel Romero	Narciso Ibáñez Menta, Irma Córdoba and Juan Carlos Thorry	Argentina	
The Mad Doctor of Market Street	Joseph H. Lewis	Una Merkel, Lionel Atwill, Nat Pendleton	United States	
The Mad Monster	Sam Newfield	Johnny Downs, George Zucco, Anne Nagel	United States	
The Mummy's Tomb	Harold Young	Lon Chaney Jr., Dick Foran, Elyse Knox, Turhan Bey	United States	
Night Monster	Ford I. Beebe	Bela Lugosi, Lionel Atwill, Irene Hervey, Ralph Morgan	United States	
The Undying Monster	John Brahm	James Ellison, Heather Angel, John Howard, Bramwell Fletcher	United States	
1943
The Ape Man	William Beaudine	Bela Lugosi, Wallace Ford, Louise Currie, Minerva Urecal	United States	
Captive Wild Woman	Edward Dmytryk	Evelyn Ankers, Acquanetta, John Carradine	United States	
Carnival of Sinners	Maurice Tourneur	Antoine Balpêtré, Pierre Fresnay, André Bacque	France	
Dead Men Walk	Sam Newfield	George Zucco, Mary Carlisle, Ned Young, Dwight Frye	United States	
Frankenstein Meets the Wolf Man	Roy William Neill	Lon Chaney Jr., Ilona Massey, Patric Knowles, Lionel Atwill, Bela Lugosi	United States	
I Walked with a Zombie	Jacques Tourneur	Tom Conway, Frances Dee, James Ellison, Edith Barrett	United States	
The Leopard Man	Jacques Tourneur	Dennis O'Keefe, Margo, Jean Brooks	United States	
The Mad Ghoul	James Hogan	David Bruce, Evelyn Ankers, George Zucco, Robert Armstrong	United States	
The Mysterious Doctor	Ben Stoloff	John Loder, Eleanor Parker, Lester Matthews	United States	
The Return of the Vampire	Lew Landers	Bela Lugosi, Frieda Inescort, Nina Foch, Roland Varno	United States	
Revenge of the Zombies	Steve Sekely	John Carradine, Robert Lowery, Gale Storm, Veda Ann Borg	United States	
The Seventh Victim	Mark Robson	Kim Hunter, Tom Conway, Isabel Jewell	United States	
Son of Dracula	Robert Siodmak	Lon Chaney Jr., Robert Paige, Louise Allbritton, Evelyn Ankers	United States	
1944
The Climax	George Waggner	Boris Karloff, Susanna Foster, Turhan Bey	United States	
Crazy Knights	William Beaudine	Billy Gilbert, Maxie Rosenbloom, Shemp Howard	United States	
Cry of the Werewolf	Henry Levin	Nina Foch, Stephen Crane, Osa Massen	United States	
The Ghost Catchers	Edward F. Cline	Ole Olsen, Chic Johnson, Gloria Jean	United States	
House of Frankenstein	Erle C. Kenton	Boris Karloff, J. Carrol Naish, Lon Chaney Jr., John Carradine	United States	
The Invisible Man's Revenge	Ford Beebe	Jon Hall, Leon Errol, John Carradine	United States	
Jungle Woman	Reginald LeBorg	Acquanetta, Evelyn Ankers, J. Carrol Naish, Samuel S. Hinds	United States	
The Lady and the Monster	George Sherman	Vera Ralston, Richard Arlen, Mary Nash, Sidney Blackmer	United States	
The Man in Half Moon Street	Ralph Murphy	Nils Asther, Helen Walker	United States	
The Monster Maker	Sam Newfield	J. Carrol Naish, Ralph Morgan, Tala Birell	United States	
The Mummy's Curse	Leslie Goodwins	Lon Chaney Jr., Peter Coe, Virginia Christine	United States	
The Mummy's Ghost	Reginald LeBorg	Lon Chaney Jr., John Carradine, Ramsay Ames, Robert Lowery	United States	
Return of the Ape Man	Phil Rosen	Bela Lugosi, John Carradine, George Zucco	United States	
The Tower of the Seven Hunchbacks	Edgar Neville	Antonio Casal, Isabel de Pomés	Spain	
The Soul of a Monster	Will Jason	Rose Hobart, George Macready, Jim Bannon, Jeanne Bates, Erik Rolf	United States	
The Uninvited	Lewis Allen	Ray Milland, Gail Russell, Ruth Hussey	United States	
Voodoo Man	William Beaudine	Bela Lugosi, John Carradine, George Zucco	United States	
Weird Woman	Reginald LeBorg	Lon Chaney Jr., Anne Gwynne, Evelyn Ankers	United States	
1945
La Fiancée des ténèbres	Serge de Poligny	Pierre Richard-Willm, Jany Holt	France	
Dead of Night	Alberto Cavalcanti, Charles Crichton, Basil Dearden, Robert Hamer	Mervyn Johns, Michael Redgrave, Sally Ann Howes, Mary Merrall	United Kingdom	
Fog Island	Terry O. Morse	George Zucco, Lionel Atwill, Jerome Cowan	United States	
Hangover Square	John Brahm	Laird Cregar, Linda Darnell, George Sanders	United States	
House of Dracula	Erle C. Kenton	Lon Chaney Jr., John Carradine, Martha O'Driscoll, Lionel Atwill	United States	
Isle of the Dead	Mark Robson	Boris Karloff, Ellen Drew, Marc Cramer, Katherine Emery	United States	
The Jungle Captive	Harold Young	Otto Kruger, Amelita Ward, Phil Brown	United States	
The Picture of Dorian Gray	Albert Lewin	George Sanders, Hurd Hatfield, Donna Reed	United States	Supernatural horror film
The Vampire's Ghost	Lesley Selander	John Abbott, Charles Gordon, Peggy Stewart	United States	
Zombies on Broadway	Gordon Douglas	Alan Carney, Bela Lugosi, Wally Brown	United States	
1946
The Beast with Five Fingers	Robert Florey	Robert Alda, Andrea King, Peter Lorre	United States	
The Cat Creeps	Erle C. Kenton	Fred Brady, Lois Collier, Paul Kelly	United States	
The Catman of Paris	Lesley Selander	Carl Esmond, Lenore Aubert, Adele Mara	United States	
The Devil Bat's Daughter	Frank Wisbar	Rosemary La Planche, John James, Michael Hale	United States	
The Face of Marble	William Beaudine	John Carradine, Claudia Drake, Robert Shayne	United States	
The Flying Serpent	Sherman Scott	George Zucco, Ralph Lewis, Hope Kramer	United States	
House of Horrors	Jean Yarbrough	Robert Lowery, Martin Kosleck, Rondo Hatton	United States	
The Mask of Diijon	Lew Landers	Erich Von Stroheim, Jeanne Bates, William Wright	United States	
She-Wolf of London	Jean Yarbrough	Don Porter, June Lockhart, Sara Haden	United States	
The Spider Woman Strikes Back	Arthur Lubin	Brenda Joyce, Gale Sondergaard, Kirby Grant	United States	
Strangler of the Swamp	Frank Wisbar	Rosemary La Planche, Robert Barrat, Blake Edwards	United States	
Valley of the Zombies	Philip Ford	Robert Livingston, Adrian Booth, Ian Keith	United States	
1948
Abbott and Costello Meet Frankenstein	Charles Barton	Bud Abbott, Lou Costello, Lon Chaney Jr.	United States	
The Amazing Mr. X	Bernard Vorhaus	Turhan Bey, Lynn Bari, Cathy O'Donnell	United States	
The Creeper	Jean Yarbrough	Eduardo Ciannelli, Onslow Stevens, June Vincent	United States	
1949
Mahal	Kamal Amrohi	Ashok Kumar, Madhubala	India	Romantic horror
New Version of the Ghost of Yotsuya	Keisuke Kinoshita	Kinuyo Tanaka, Ken Uehara, Hisako Yamane	Japan	

== See also ==
- Lists of horror films
