= The Brute Man =

1946 film

- Theatrical release poster
- Directed by: Jean Yarbrough
- Screenplay by: George Bricker; M. Coates Webster
- Story by: Dwight V. Babcock
- Produced by: Ben Pivar
- Starring: Tom Neal; Jane Adams; Jan Wiley; Peter Whitney; Donald MacBride; Rondo Hatton
- Cinematography: Maury Gertsman
- Edited by: Philip Cahn
- Music by: Hans J. Salter
- Production company: Universal Pictures
- Distributed by: Producers Releasing Corporation
- Release date: October 1, 1946
- Running time: 58 minutes
- Country: United States
- Language: English
- Budget: $125,000

The Brute Man is a 1946 American horror thriller film starring Rondo Hatton as the Creeper, a murderer seeking revenge against the people he holds responsible for the disfigurement of his face. Directed by Jean Yarbrough, the film features Tom Neal and Jan Wiley as a married pair of friends the Creeper blames for his deformities. Jane Adams also stars as a blind pianist for whom the Creeper tries to raise money for an operation to restore her vision. The film is a prequel to House of Horrors (1946).

Universal Pictures produced the film near the end of their horror film period. As the result of its pending merger with International Pictures, Universal adopted a policy against releasing any more B movies, so they sold The Brute Man for $125,000 to the low-budget Producers Releasing Corporation, which distributed the film without any mention of Universal's involvement in publicity or credits. (Universal did in fact continue to produce a few more small-budget productions, but these commitments had begun in 1946 and had to be completed over the next year.) Universal may have concluded that the exploitation of Hatton's deformity for the third time (in which evidence of his impending demise may be foreshadowed in his acting) to be detrimental to its corporate image, but did not want to take a financial loss by simply shelving the film.

The film was released to home video in 1982. The Brute Man received generally negative reviews, drawing particular criticism for Hatton's poor performance. The film was featured in a 1996 episode of the movie-mocking comedy television series Mystery Science Theater 3000. Members of Mystery Science Theater later expressed discomfort in making fun of the film due to Hatton's illness.

== Plot ==
The police investigate a string of murders committed by the Creeper, a mysterious killer with a hideously disfigured face. The Creeper attacks and murders Professor Cushman, a professor from the nearby Hampton University. Later that night, the killer approaches a woman named Joan Bemis in front of her home and identifies himself as Hal Moffet. Joan screams hysterically at the sight of him until he is driven to kill her. When police cars approach, the Creeper climbs the fire escape of a city tenement building to escape and enters the apartment of Helen Paige, a blind pianist. Unable to see the Creeper's deformed face, Helen is not afraid of the intruder, even when he admits to fleeing. When police officers knock on her door, failing to identify themselves, Helen encourages him to hide in her bedroom, where he escapes through the window.

The next day, a general store delivery boy named Jimmy listens to a radio report about the Creeper's murders. The cantankerous store owner Mr. Haskins arrives with a handwritten letter slipped under the door, requesting groceries be delivered to a nearby dock. Jimmy brings the groceries to the dock and leaves them at a door, where the Creeper takes them into his hideout. But, when Jimmy tries to spy on him through a window, the Creeper sneaks up on Jimmy and kills him. Meanwhile, at the police station, Captain M.J. Donelly and Lieutenant Gates receive complaints from the mayor's office about their failure to arrest the Creeper, but they deflect the blame. The two officers then get a call about the missing delivery boy and head to the dock to investigate.

The Creeper sneaks out and escapes while Donelly and Gates infiltrate his hideout and discover Jimmy's corpse. Donnelly also finds a newspaper clipping with a man named Hal Moffet and two of his friends, Clifford Scott and Virginia Rogers, during their college days. The police visit Clifford and Virginia, who are now married and wealthy. Clifford tells the officers during college, Hal was a handsome college football star who competed with Clifford for Virginia's affections. One day, while helping Hal prepare for a chemistry exam, a jealous Clifford deliberately gave him the wrong answers, resulting in Hal being asked by Professor Cushman to remain after class for extra work. While working on a chemistry experiment, Clifford walks by the window with Virginia to boast. Furious, Hal hurls a beaker to the ground, accidentally causing an explosion that disfigures his face. Donnelly speculates that Hal is the Creeper, and that he killed Professor Cushman and Joan because he holds them partially responsible for his accident.

Meanwhile, the Creeper goes to a pawn store to buy a brooch for Helen, and kills the pawnbroker following a fight. He later brings the brooch to Helen, who he realizes for the first time is blind. Hal learns she needs $3,000 for surgery that would restore her eyesight. When Helen tries to touch his face, Hal angrily storms out. He then goes to the Scott residence and demands money from Clifford and Virginia, whom he blames for his disfigurement. Clifford draws a gun and shoots Hal twice in the stomach, but the weakened Hal manages to strangle Clifford to death before escaping with Virginia's jewels. He brings them to Helen, who is concerned about Hal's injuries, but he flees before she can learn he is shot.

Helen brings the jewels to an appraiser, who recognizes them as having recently been reported stolen. Donelly and Gates bring Helen into the station, where they inform her Hal is the Creeper and accuse her of harboring a murderer. Reluctantly, she agrees to help them capture him. The next day, the newspapers run stories about Helen cooperating with police, which infuriates Hal. Feeling betrayed, he sneaks back into her apartment and finds her playing the piano. Sneaking up from behind, Hal is about to strangle her when the police seize and arrest him. The film ends with Donelly and Gates assuring Helen she will get the operation she needs.

== Cast ==
- Rondo Hatton as Hal Moffat / The Creeper
- Tom Neal as Clifford Scott
- Jan Wiley as Virginia Rogers Scott
- Jane Adams as Helen Paige
- Donald MacBride as Police Captain M. J. Donelly
- Peter Whitney as Police Lieutenant Gates
- Fred Coby as Young Hal Moffat
- Janelle Johnson Dolenz as Joan Bemis
- Jack Parker as Jimmy
- Oscar O'Shea as Mr. Haskins
- Joseph Crehan as Police Commissioner Salisbury (uncredited)
- John Hamilton as Professor Cushman (uncredited)

== Production ==
=== Writing ===
The screenplay for The Brute Man was written by George Bricker and M. Coates Webster based on a story by Dwight V. Babcock. An author of pulp fiction stories and novels, Babock started writing for Universal Pictures in 1943, where he worked primarily on horror films. The Brute Man marked the last of nine films Babcock wrote for Universal before he left for a job at Columbia Pictures. Bricker wrote several screenplays in a variety of genres, from horror films and mysteries to comedies, and worked primarily as a freelancer jumping from studio to studio. Babcock and Brister previously worked together on several low-budget horror films, including The Devil Bat (1940), House of Dracula (1945), Pillow of Death (1945), She-Wolf of London (1946) and House of Horrors (1946). Bricker and Webster both previously wrote the screenplays for Universal films featuring The Brute Man star Rondo Hatton: Bricker penned House of Horrors, and Webster wrote The Jungle Captive (1947), the third in a series of films about an ape that transforms into a beautiful woman.

The origin of the Creeper in The Brute Man is in part inspired by the real-life story of actor Rondo Hatton, who suffered from acromegaly.

The Brute Man is a quasi-prequel to House of Horrors, in which Hatton played a deformed madman named "the Creeper" who kills people by breaking their backs. In The Brute Man, Hatton also plays "the Creeper", while the story explains how he became deformed and why he has a murderous personality. Hatton also played a disfigured killer called the Huxton Creeper in The Pearl of Death, a 1944 Sherlock Holmes film, but neither House of Horrors nor The Brute Man have any connection to that film. In establishing a backstory explaining the Creeper's motives, The Brute Man's script seeks to humanize the character and elicit more sympathy for him than the Creeper's other films, in which he is generally portrayed as a two-dimensional murderer. The origin of the Creeper is based partially on autobiographical details from Hatton's real life. Before becoming disfigured by an accident, the Creeper was a handsome young college football hero. Hatton himself was also a football player at the University of Florida before experiencing the effects of acromegaly, a syndrome that causes abnormal bone growth due to excess growth hormone from the pituitary gland. In the film, the character is disfigured by chemicals during a laboratory accident in school. While Hatton's real-life abnormalities stemmed from acromegaly, it was often incorrectly stated by Universal publicity materials that they were the result of exposure to mustard gas attacks during Hatton's service in World War I.

The film's setting, which appears to be a major city, is never identified in The Brute Man, but it has been suggested to be Manhattan, since that is where House of Horrors took place. Commentators have noted similarities between The Brute Man and other films, including the Charlie Chaplin silent comedy City Lights (1931), and the Universal horror film Bride of Frankenstein (1935). City Lights, like The Brute Man, included a protagonist (Chaplin's Tramp character) who falls in love with a blind girl and seeks money for an operation to restore her eyesight. Likewise, the scenes between the Creeper and Helen Paige share a similar premise and dialogue as the scenes between Frankenstein's monster and the blind hermit in Bride of Frankenstein. In both films, the protagonists are shunned by society based on their physical appearance, but find companionship in a blind loner who knows nothing about their deformities. In both instances, the protagonist is first drawn to their blind companions by music. The Creeper heard Helen playing the piano, while Frankenstein's monster heard the hermit playing the violin. Commentators have noted other similarities between the two films. For example, the Creeper smashes a mirror after looking at his misshapen face, much like the Monster lashes out at his reflection in a waterfall pool.

=== Casting ===
The Brute Man marked one of several films in which Universal cast Hatton as a murderer, taking advantage of his natural deformities for shock value. As a result of his acromegaly, Hatton had abnormally enlarged and shaped bones on his head and hands, and the Universal publicity department often promoted the fact that Hatton did not need make-up for his roles. Tom Neal, who had recently appeared in the cult classic noir film Detour (1945), was cast as Clifford Scott. Having appeared in dozens of low-budget films throughout the early-1940s, Neal began to become known as the "King of the B Pictures". In The Brute Man, Neal portrayed Scott both in his older years and in the flashback scenes, where the character appears as a college student. To differentiate between the two, Neal was fitted with make-up and costumes to make him better resemble a middle-aged man during his non-flashback scenes. Jane Adams was cast as the blind pianist Helen Paige. Adams had appeared in several Universal films before, including the Lon Chaney Jr. film House of Dracula (1945).

Jan Wiley was cast as Scott's wife, Virginia. Although Wiley had appeared in several movies throughout the 1930s and 1940s, The Brute Man marked one of her final film performances before retiring from the film industry in 1947. It was also recalled as one of her most memorable film appearances along with another Universal B horror film, She-Wolf of London. However, her performance in The Brute Man proved to be a less than memorable one for her, so much so that in an interview shortly before Wiley's death in 1993, she could barely remember even having appeared in the film. Donald MacBride and Peter Whitney portray the police officers Captain M.J. Donelly and Lieutenant Gates, respectively. Their roles serve as comic relief for the film. Their characters portray the incompetence of the police force in their inability to find and arrest the Creeper and their focus on passing blame for their failures rather than diverting resources toward his arrest.

=== Filming ===
The Brute Man was developed by Universal Pictures Company, Inc. in the later years of their successful production of horror films, including Dracula (1931), Frankenstein (1931) and The Mummy (1932). While those films were great critical and financial successes, The Brute Man was filmed during what was widely considered the low point of the studio's horror film period. It was produced by Ben Pivar and directed by Jean Yarbrough, both of whom had worked on House of Horrors and many other horror films for Universal over the years. The Brute Man was filmed in 13 days, during November 1945. The flashback scenes - which depict how Hal Moffet became disfigured and ultimately became the Creeper - were all shot on the final day of filming. Jane Adams said Hatton's acromegaly was becoming progressively worse by the time The Brute Man was filmed, and it made acting difficult for him. Hatton had trouble remembering his lines, focusing on his performance, and responding to the other actors. Hatton occasionally appears confused even on screen, like during one scene where he says "yes" while shaking his head "no". Adams called him a friendly and thoughtful man, but called him "so pathetic to work with [and] almost autistic".

Maury Gertsman was the director of photography on The Brute Man. Since the film focused on a disfigured serial killer, Gertsman sought to give the movie a dark, diseased look appropriate for the film's subject matter and urban setting. Although primarily a horror thriller film, Gertsman uses several film noir elements in his photography, including shadowed lighting, unbalanced compositions, and chiaroscuro contrasts between light and dark. As a result, The Brute Man features a bleak, at times dismal visual atmosphere. Hans J. Salter, who composed the scores for many of the Universal films of the 1940s and 1950s, worked as composer for The Brute Man as well. Salter's score for the film strongly resembled the music he composed for the Universal horror films Black Friday (1940) and The Invisible Man's Revenge (1944). Philip Cahn edited The Brute Man. Raymond Kessler and Ralph Slosser worked as dialogue director and assistant director, respectively, while John B. Goodman and Abraham Grossman worked as art directors. Other crew included Russell A. Gausman and Edward R. Robinson as set decorators, Joe Lapis as sound technician, Jack Pierce as make-up director, Carmen Dirigo as hair stylist, and Vera West as gowns supervisor.

== Release ==
=== Distribution ===
Although produced by Universal Pictures, The Brute Man was distributed by Producers Releasing Corporation (PRC), one of the smaller film studios from Hollywood's Poverty Row. In 1945, Universal merged with the company International Pictures, and the new organization adopted a policy against developing any more B movies, including Westerns, horror films, serials, and movies running 70 minutes or less. This resulted in the firing of numerous production personnel members and the sale of several already-developed films, including The Brute Man. The sale was also precipitated in part by the death of star Rondo Hatton. He died as a result of his acromegaly on February 2, 1946, about eight months before The Brute Man was first screened, making it his final film. Universal feared releasing the film so soon after his death would lead to accusations that the studio was exploiting the illness that ultimately killed Hatton. Now embarrassed by the film, the studio was anxious to sell it.

Universal sold the film to PRC for $125,000, which represented the negative cost plus interest. The transaction occurred around August 1946, but was not made public until it was screened for the trade press on October 1, marking its official release date. The sale occurred so quickly and hastily on the copyright files stores at the Library of Congress, the name Universal Pictures was crossed out and Pathe Industries, PRC's corporate body, was written in its place in pencil. Some pressbook advertisements circulated for the film still included the Universal logo. PRC had previously produced a horror film about acromegaly called The Monster Maker (1944), in which a mad scientist injects human subjects with the disease as part of his experiments.

=== Reception ===
Dark and morbid, The Brute Man stands out like a bad mark even on a list of Universal's bad films because it weaves into its seamy story autobiographic details of Hatton's actual life. ... The fact that The Brute Man was a "re-imagining" of Hatton's private life, one not overburdened with good taste, could not have been missed by the unfortunate actor.

— Universal Horrors: The Studio's
Classic Films, 1931-1946

The Brute Man received generally negative critical reviews following its release on October 1, 1946. A 1946 review in the Harrison's Reports trade journal, found that the film had some suspenseful moments and could be enjoyed by fans of the genre, but that the overall effect was "artificial and stagy". The reviewer stated most audiences "will find it tiresome in plot and in treatment [...] in fact, some of the action and dialogue may provoke laughs, instead of serious response". A Variety review described the film as "singularly unexciting meller". New York Post critic Arthur Winsten criticized the story and the acting of Rondo Hatton, commenting that his facial disfigurements alone did not make up for his poor acting skills: "Just as clothes don't make a gentleman, so a face doesn't make both a villain and continuous thrills. All this picture has is a face, handicapped by encircling improbabilities". In a review published in 1947, Wanda Hale of the New York Daily News called it "a crude production [...] compiled of bits from various B thrillers". In contrast, Mandel Herbstman of The Motion Picture Herald, said although the film used standard thriller film devices, The Brute Man "stands favorably" in its genre and director Jean Yarbrough kept the film moving at a brisk pace.

Decades after the film's release, retrospective reviews of The Brute Man were similarly negative, with many commentators criticizing the exploitation of Hatton's real-life acromegaly. John Stanley, host of the KTVU television show Creature Features, described it as a dull and "shoddy thriller", criticizing both the performances and the mood from the direction and photography. The authors of Universal Horrors: The Studio's Classic Films, 1931-1946 were highly critical of the film's dialogue, and claimed much of the script seemed to be "time-killing stuff" to pad the film's already-short running time. They wrote that Hatton's acting was so bad, it "wouldn't be acceptable even at a pre-production cast get-together and table reading, much less in the movie itself". Donald C. Willis, a writer who wrote about horror and science fiction films, described the horror scenes as completely lacking suspense, and said the film was "so flimsy that its three co-plots seem to be operating independently of one another".

=== Analysis ===
The film critic and scholar Keith Brown argued that The Brute Man is an example of what he calls the "terror film", a genre distinguishable from the horror film due to its emphasis on naturally occurring sources of fear, rather than fantastical or otherworldly horror elements. Brown wrote that the Creeper character "blurs the boundary between human and animal on account of his grotesque, deformed features, but is natural and thus a figure of terror". Cory Legassic, in a chapter dedicated to Rondo Hatton in Recovering 1940s Horror Cinema: Traces of a Lost Decade, wrote that The Brute Man's narrative was modeled after Hatton's life. Legassic noted similarities between Hatton and his character Hal Moffet both being handsome sports stars who end up disfigured.

=== Home media ===
For decades after the film's theatrical release, copies of The Brute Man were unavailable, and it became regarded as a lost film. However, the film was eventually discovered and mass-produced by Admit One, a home video distribution company that focused specifically on lesser-known B films. The Brute Man was first released on Betamax and VHS in 1982 by Admit One. It has been reissued on VHS several times since then, and was released on laserdisc format in 1990. The Brute Man was most recently released on VHS by Image Entertainment in 1999, a year which also marked the first DVD release of the film, also by Image Entertainment. In his 2004 DVD guide book, Douglas Pratt complimented both the picture and sound transfers of the 1999 DVD release: "The picture looks great. There are a couple shots where a few speckles pop up, but much of the time the image is clean, with deep blacks and sharp, finely graded contrasts".

== Legacy ==
The villain character Lothar from The Rocketeer (1991) was made to resemble that of Rondo Hatton in The Brute Man.

Rondo Hatton's likeness from The Brute Man inspired the appearance of one of the villain characters in Dave Stevens' Rocketeer comic book as well as the 1991 film adaptation, The Rocketeer. In the film, the seven-foot-tall Tiny Ron Taylor portrays Lothar, a murderous henchman for the story's antagonist. Rick Baker, a special make-up effects artist that worked on the film, designed the character's facial make-up to resemble Hatton's Creeper character, and Lothar dresses in a dark coat and hat similar to his clothing from The Brute Man.

In 2002, the founders of the website The Classic Horror Film Board created the Rondo Hatton Classic Horror Awards to honor horror works in film, television and publishing. The awards were named after the actor, and award recipients received statuettes with miniature busts of Hatton as he appeared portraying the Creeper in House of Horrors and The Brute Man. The statuettes were sculpted by illustrator Kerry Gammill and cast by modeler Timothy M. Lindsey.

=== Mystery Science Theater 3000 ===
The Brute Man was featured in a seventh-season episode of Mystery Science Theater 3000, in which the film was watched and mocked by Mike Nelson and his two robot friends, Crow T. Robot and Tom Servo.

The Brute Man was featured in a seventh season episode of the satirical television series Mystery Science Theater 3000 alongside the 1948 industrial short The Chicken of Tomorrow. The Brute Man was the second episode of the seventh season, which was broadcast on Comedy Central on February 10, 1996. The description for The Brute Man in The Mystery Science Theater 3000 Amazing Colossal Episode Guide, a book by the cast and writers of the series, reads: "A dark film about dark things. Rondo Hatton's swan song; he died just weeks after the film was completed. So murky and dark, it makes M look like Mrs. Doubtfire". In 2011, Shout! Factory released the MST3K episode as part of the Volume XXII collection, along with episodes focused on Time of the Apes, Mighty Jack, and The Violent Years.

In 1995, Michael J. Nelson, the show's head writer who also plays the character of the same name, said the staff initially felt strange making jokes at the expense of Rondo Hatton and his real-life illness; however, Nelson said: "Then you realize it's the whole point of the movie: he's a guy with a big ugly face...And he is a terribly bad actor". Paul Chaplin, another writer with the series, said in 2001 of the actor's acromegaly: "That fact opens up a large, irresolvable issue concerning the movie industry's use of this poor afflicted fellow; he was paid, after all, and movie work is nice work. Yet it can seem exploitative of misfortune". Mary Jo Pehl, who played Pearl Forrester, said in the DVD introduction to the MST3K episode that she did not think it was one of the series' strongest episodes and because of Hatton's illness would not have made fun of the film if given a chance to do it over again.
