= Fährmann Maria =

- Theatrical poster
- Directed by: Frank Wisbar
- Written by: Frank Wisbar; Hans-Jürgen Nierentz
- Produced by: Eberhard Schmidt
- Starring: Sybille Schmitz; Aribert Moog; Peter Voß; Karl Platen
- Cinematography: Franz Weihmayr
- Edited by: Lena Neumann
- Music by: Herbert Windt
- Distributed by: Pallas Film (II)
- Release date: 7 January 1936
- Running time: 83 minutes
- Country: Germany
- Language: German

Fährmann Maria (lit. Ferryman Maria) is a 1936 German horror film directed by Frank Wisbar and starring Sybille Schmitz.

== Plot ==
An elderly man operates a ferry near a small village. One evening, he weakens and dies while ferrying a silent stranger dressed in black.

Some time later, a homeless woman arrives in the village seeking employment, and takes over the ferrying duties. The next evening, a wounded man boards her ferry. She hides him from his pursuers and nurses him back to health in her hut. Gradually, they fall in love.

Soon the silent stranger in black appears on the far shore, summoning the ferry. As they cross the river, he eventually breaks his silence to inquire about the wounded man. Maria realizes that the stranger is Death itself, and she seeks to outwit him by directing him away from her hut and into the village where a festival is in progress. The villagers at the festival recoil from the stranger, who dances with Maria until she escapes from him and runs to a church. She falls to the floor and prays for death to take her and spare the wounded man.

The stranger finds Maria in the church and demands to be led to her hut. To reach it they must walk across a marsh. As they negotiate the treacherous path through the marsh, Maria again prays that her own life be sacrificed so the man she has been sheltering may live. The stranger makes a wrong step and sinks into the mud. The marsh swallows him completely and Maria gets safely away.

The next morning, Maria and her lover ferry to the opposite shore to begin a new life together.

== Cast ==
- Sybille Schmitz as Maria
- Aribert Moog as Wounded man
- Peter Voß as the Stranger / Death
- Karl Platen as The Ferryman

== Production ==
The interior scenes were shot in Berlin studios from August to October in 1935 while the outdoor scenes were filmed in Lower Saxony (the Hamburg, Bremen and Hanover areas) near a farm called Tütsberg in the village of Heber, and also near Soltau.

== Release ==
The film premiered at the Bernward Light Games in Hildesheim on 7 January 1936.

== Awards ==
The National Socialists had changed film inspection standards in 1934 (originally to increase the quality of film production by creating censorship standards) to also cover film awards, and as a result movies would be awarded extra consideration, and lower taxes, if they were deemed state-politically and artistically particularly valuable. Though Joseph Goebbels, Propaganda Minister for the Third Reich, dismissed it as "an experiment, but not a good one", the film still received an award for artistic value.

== Remake ==
After Wisbar emigrated from Germany to the U.S. following the November pogroms of 1938 (Kristallnacht) he worked odd jobs in cinema. In 1945, he remade Fährmann Maria as Strangler of the Swamp for Producers Releasing Corporation. The remake was filmed quickly on a small budget, and was more horrific than the atmospheric original.
