= Nolan Leary =

American film, television, theatre actor and playwright (1889–1987)

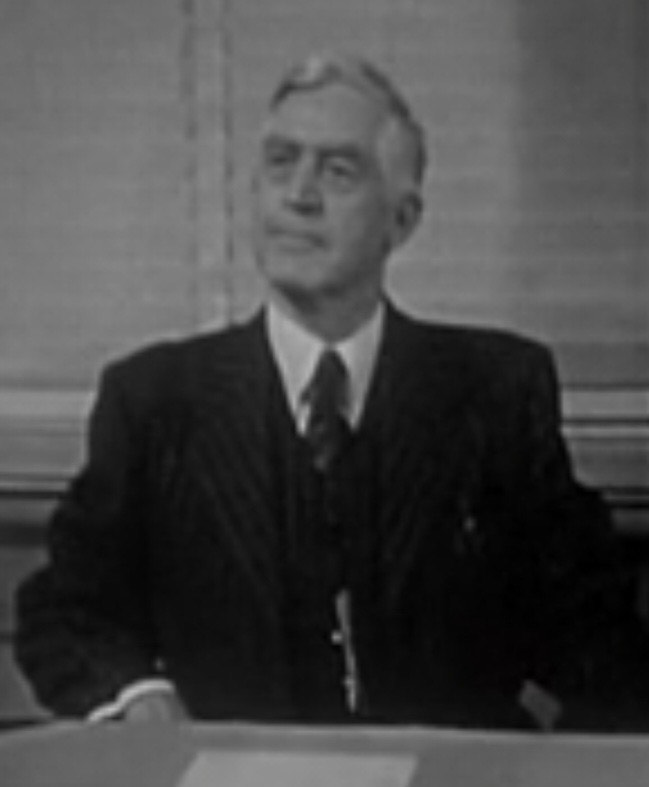
- Leary in Man with a Camera (1958)
- Born: George Nolan Leary; April 26, 1889; Rock Island County, Illinois, U.S.
- Died: December 12, 1987 (aged 98); Los Angeles, California, U.S.
- Occupations: Film, television, theatre actor and playwright
- Years active: 1919–1981
- Spouse: Helen Leary

George Nolan Leary (April 26, 1889 – December 12, 1987) was an American actor and playwright.

== Biography ==
Leary was born in Rock Island County, Illinois. His acting career started in France during World War I, providing entertainment for United States Troops. In 1919 he appeared in the Broadway play Forbidden, playing the Second Lieutenant and Luke O'Keefe. Other Broadway appearances included productions of Happy Landing, Rendezvous and Dodsworth.

He later appeared in films and on television. His film appearances included roles in The Valley of Vanishing Men, Strangler of the Swamp, That Texas Jamboree, Out California Way, Love Laughs at Andy Hardy, I Wonder Who's Kissing Her Now, The Secret Life of Walter Mitty and Devil Bat's Daughter. Leary retired in 1981, after making his final TV appearance in Nero Wolfe.

Leary died in December 1987 at the Good Samaritan Hospital in Los Angeles, California, at the age of 98. He was buried in Hollywood Forever Cemetery.

== Selected filmography ==
- Perry Mason (1957) (Season 1, Episode 4: "The Case of the Drowning Duck") as Judge Meeham
- The Alfred Hitchcock Hour (1963) (Season 2 Episode 7: "Starring the Defense") as Movie Judge
