= Strangler of the Swamp =

1946 film by Frank Wisbar

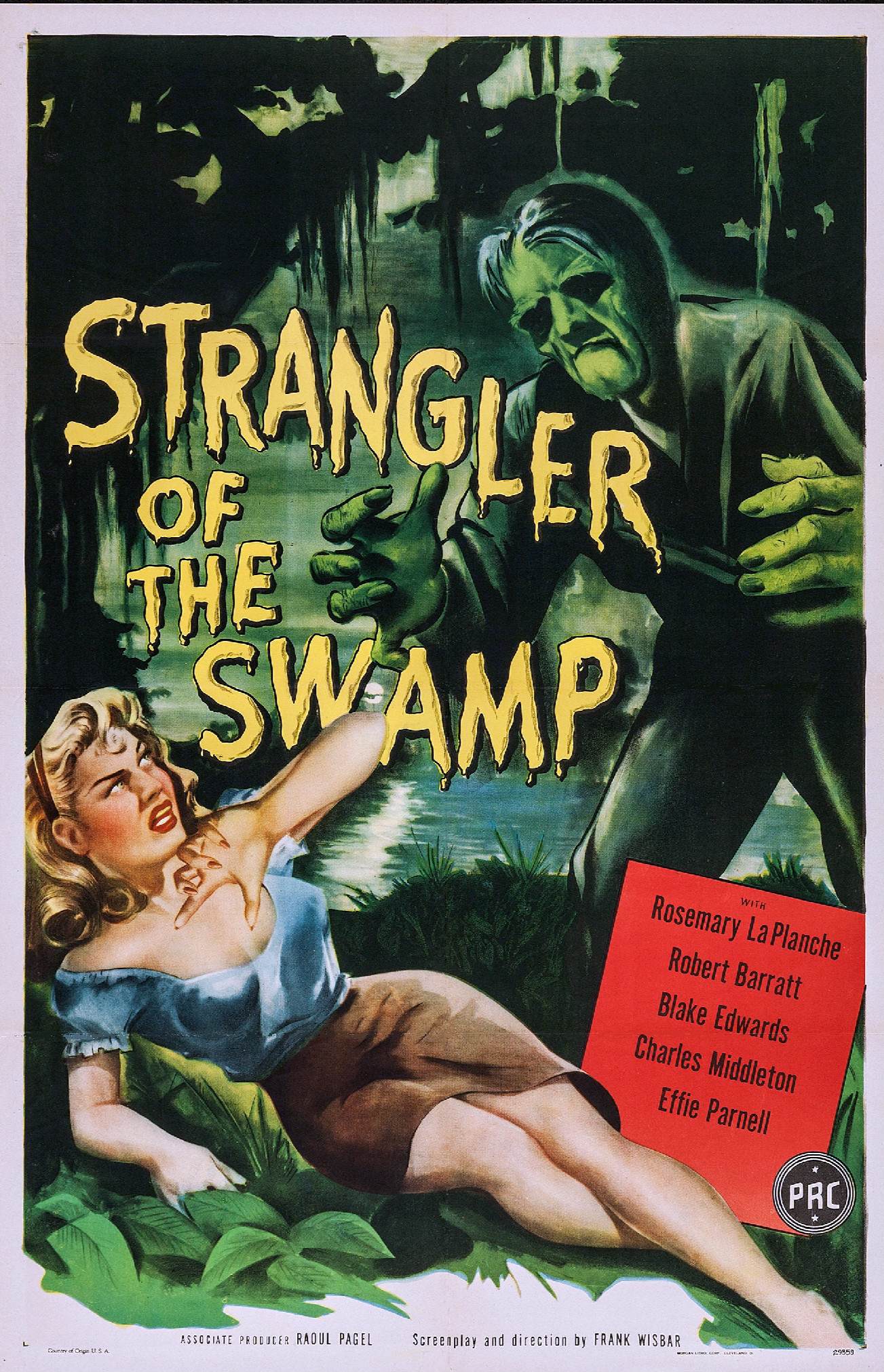
- Theatrical release poster
- Directed by: Frank Wisbar
- Screenplay by: Frank Wisbar; Harold Erickson (additional dialogue)
- Story by: Frank Wisbar; Leo J. McCarthy
- Produced by: Raoul Pagel
- Starring: Rosemary La Planche; Robert Barrat; Blake Edwards; Charles Middleton; Nolan Leary; Virginia Farmer
- Cinematography: James S. Brown Jr.
- Edited by: Hugh Winn
- Music by: Alexander Steinert
- Production company: Producers Releasing Corporation (PRC)
- Distributed by: Producers Releasing Corporation (PRC); Madison Pictures; Pathé Pictures Ltd.(UK)
- Release date: 5 January 1946
- Running time: 58 minutes
- Country: United States
- Language: English

Strangler of the Swamp is a 1946 American horror film, produced and distributed by Producers Releasing Corporation. It was written and directed by Frank Wisbar, and stars Rosemary LaPlanche, Robert Barrat and Blake Edwards. It is a remake of Wisbar's earlier German film Fährmann Maria (1936).

== Plot ==
A ferry operator named Douglas (Charles Middleton) was accused of a murder he did not commit and executed for the crime. Now Douglas' ghost walks the marshlands he once called home, seeking vengeance against those who wronged him. The village's new ferry operator, the beautiful Maria (Rosemary LaPlanche) must find a way to save her boyfriend Christian (Blake Edwards) from becoming the ghost's next victim.

== Cast ==
- Rosemary La Planche as Maria Hart
- Robert Barrat as Christian Sanders
- Blake Edwards as Christian 'Chris' Sanders Jr.
- Charles Middleton as Ferryman Douglas
- Effie Laird as Martina Sanders
- Nolan Leary as Pete Jeffers
- Frank Conlan as Joseph Hart
- Therese Lyon as Bertha
- Virginia Farmer as Anna Jeffers

== Release ==
The film was released on January 5, 1946.

=== Home media ===
The film was released on DVD by Image Entertainment on September 21, 1999. It was later re-released by Films Around The World Inc. on January 1, 2013.

== Reception ==
Author and film critic Leonard Maltin awarded the film two and a half out of a possible four stars, his most frequently given rating, writing "Moody, atmospheric, full of fog, it's far more cinematic that other horror films from bargain-basement PRC studio, but still suffers from a low budget as well as a lethargic pace." Hans J. Wollstein, in his review of the film for Allmovie, gave the film a positive review, complimenting LaPlanche and Middleton's performances.
