= Devil Bat's Daughter =

1946 film by Frank Wisbar

- Directed by: Frank Wisbar
- Written by: Griffin Jay
- Starring: Rosemary La Planche
- Cinematography: James S. Brown Jr.
- Edited by: W.L. Bagier
- Production company: Producers Releasing Corporation
- Release date: April 15, 1946
- Running time: 67 minutes
- Country: United States
- Language: English

Devil Bat's Daughter is a 1946 American horror film directed by Frank Wisbar. It stars Rosemary La Planche, who was crowned Miss America 1941. It is a sequel to the 1941 film The Devil Bat, with no returning cast members.

It marked the film debut of Michael Hale, a former ad man for the Los Angeles Times, who was married to one of Hedda Hopper's assistants.

== Plot ==
A beautiful young woman is found in a trance. A taxi driver claims to have taken her to "the Carruthers place", so a police officer and neighbor Dr. Eliot take her there.

They learn, with help from psychiatrist Cliff Morris, that the woman is a Nina MacCarron, and that her father, Dr. Paul Carruthers, once conducted experiments on bats that led people to calling him a vampire and who died from his own creation in the events of the previous film.

As strange events occur leading to suspicion that Nina is mad, Ellen Morris, unhappy wife of Cliff, takes an interest in her, as does Ted Masters, who returns from the Army and falls in love with Nina. Together they prove that Cliff Morris is behind a diabolical plot.

== Cast ==
- Rosemary La Planche as Nina
- Molly Lamont as Ellen
- John James as Ted
- Michael Hale as Morris
- Nolan Leary as Dr. Eliot
