= Vera West =

American fashion designer

Vera Flounders West
- Born: Vera Flounders; June 26, 1897; Philadelphia, Pennsylvania
- Died: June 29, 1947 (aged 50); Glendale, California
- Body discovered: Los Angeles
- Education: Philadelphia School of Design for Women
- Occupation: Fashion designer
- Spouse(s): Stephen D. Kille (1924–1929); John Cunningham West (1930)

Signature
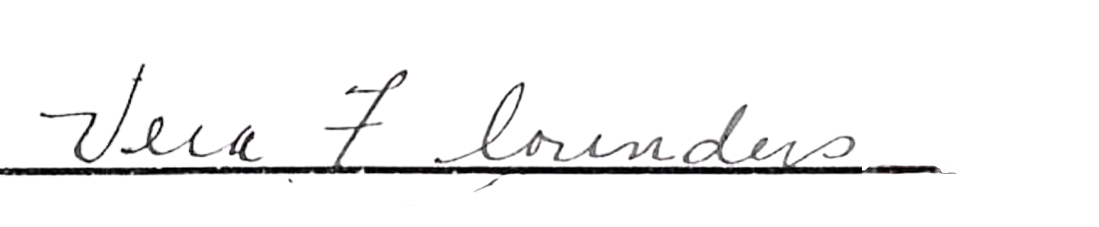

Vera West, née Flounders, (28 June 1897 – 29 June 1947) was an American fashion designer and film costume designer. From 1928 to 1947, she was the chief costume designer for Universal Pictures.

== Personal life ==
The details of West's early life are unclear. The 1900 census lists her as living at the age of 3 at 3121 Richmond St, Philadelphia, and born in Pennsylvania. The next census from 1910 lists her living at age 12 at 115 Manheim St, Philadelphia, and her birthplace is also listed as Philadelphia. Her parents were Emer L Flounders, a sheet metal worker born in Maryland, and "Lillian" or "Clara N" of Philadelphia. Her mother's identity is unclear. She had a younger sister named Hazel. The following census from 1920 lists her as living at the same Philadelphia address at 22 and is listed as a dressmaker working for a dressmaking establishment.

Vera West was married twice, first to electrotyper Stephen D. Kille in 1924, but the couple divorced in 1929. In 1930 she married businessman and cosmetician John Cunningham West.

== Works ==
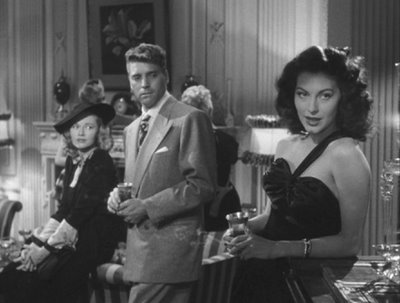
Ava Gardner wearing a gown designed by West in The Killers (1946)

She attended the Philadelphia School of Design for Women. After graduation, West designed dresses for a high-end fashion salon on Fifth Avenue in New York. In the mid-1920s, she was forced to leave New York for unknown personal reasons. She eventually went to Hollywood, where she found a job with Universal Pictures and rose to become chief costume designer for the film studio in 1928.

The first production for which she made costumes based on her own designs was the film The Man Who Laughs (1928) by German director Paul Leni, based on the Victor Hugo novel of the same name. According to IMDb, West has at least 393 film credits. She specialised in gowns, and was not only responsible for dressing the actors, but also saw to their off-film personal styling.

One of West's best-known designs is the gown worn by Ava Gardner in the 1946 film The Killers.

In early 1947, West left Universal to work on a spring fashion collection for a salon in the Beverly Wilshire Hotel.

West's designs at the Los Angeles Times Spring Fashion Show, February 24, 1936

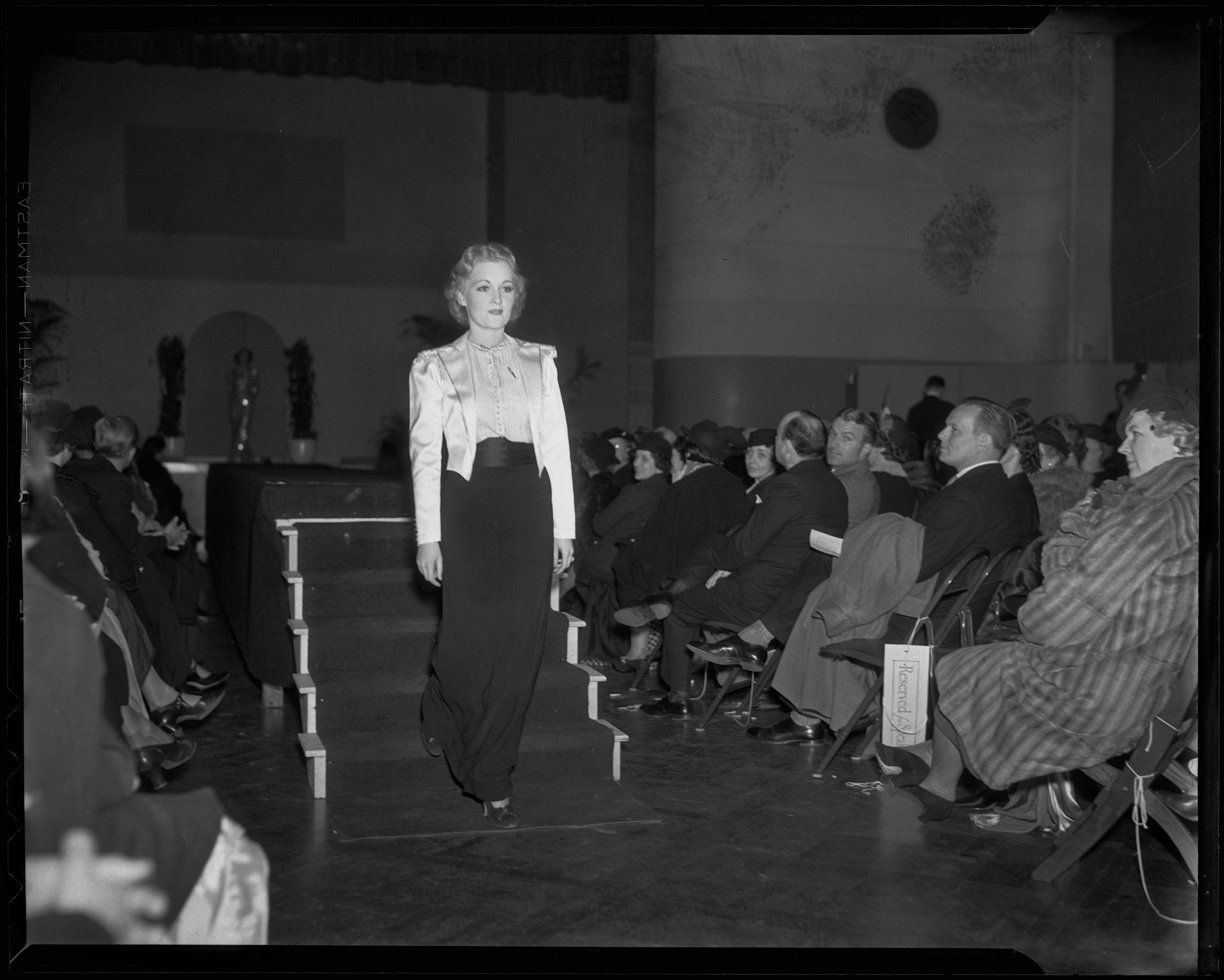
Diana Gibson models a cocktail suit

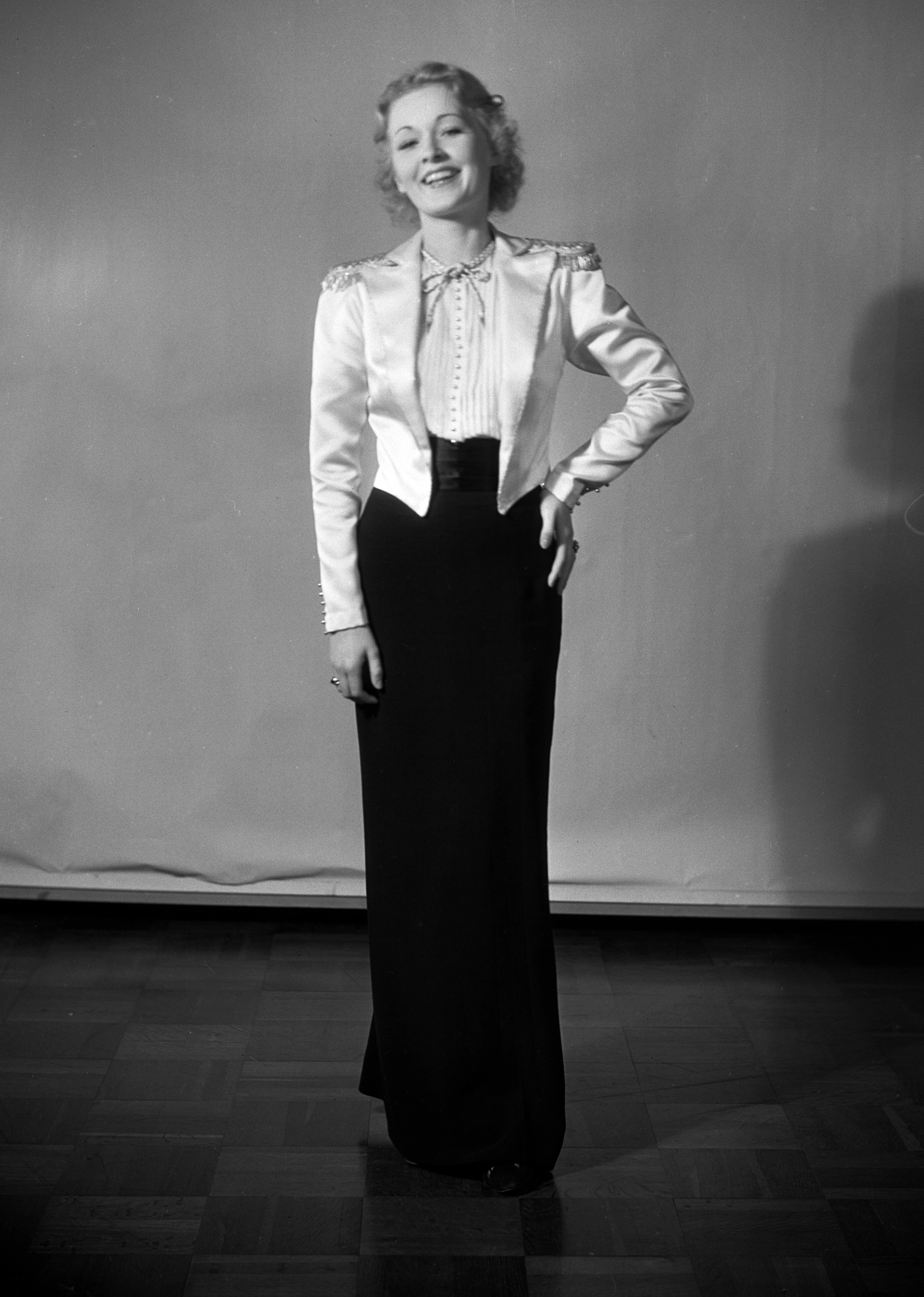
Diana Gibson in a cocktail suit

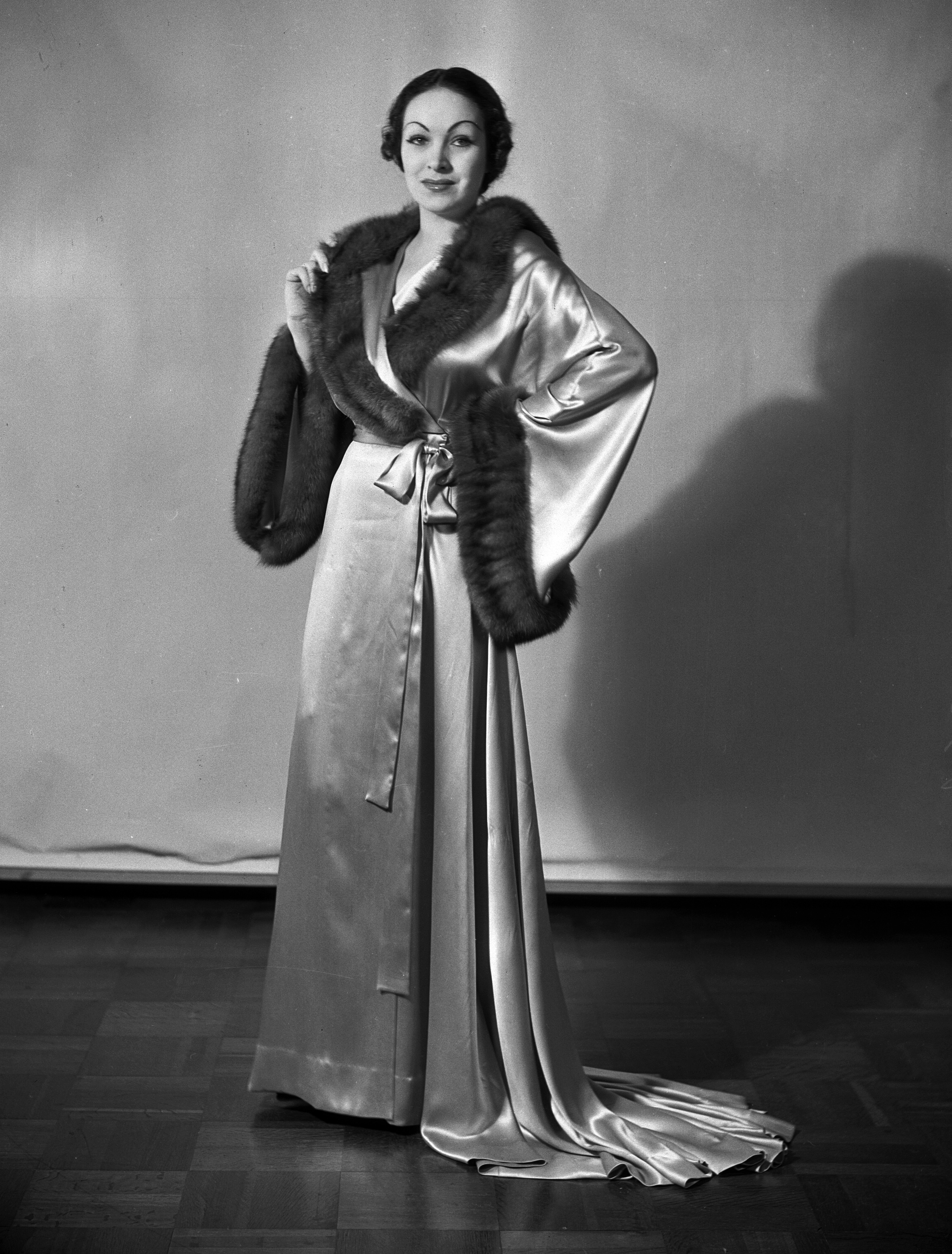
Priscilla Lawson in a satin and fur negligee

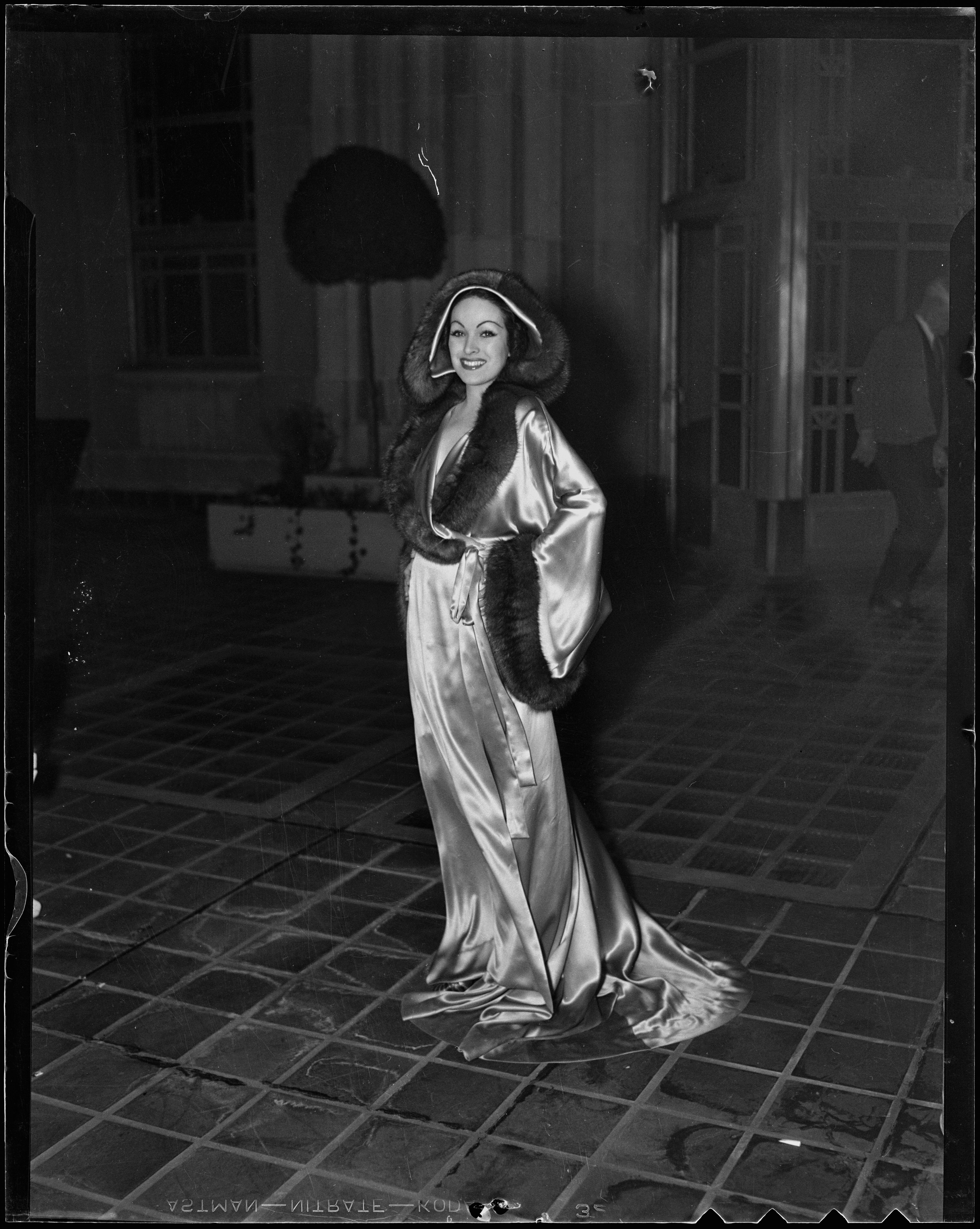
Priscilla Lawson in a satin and fur negligee

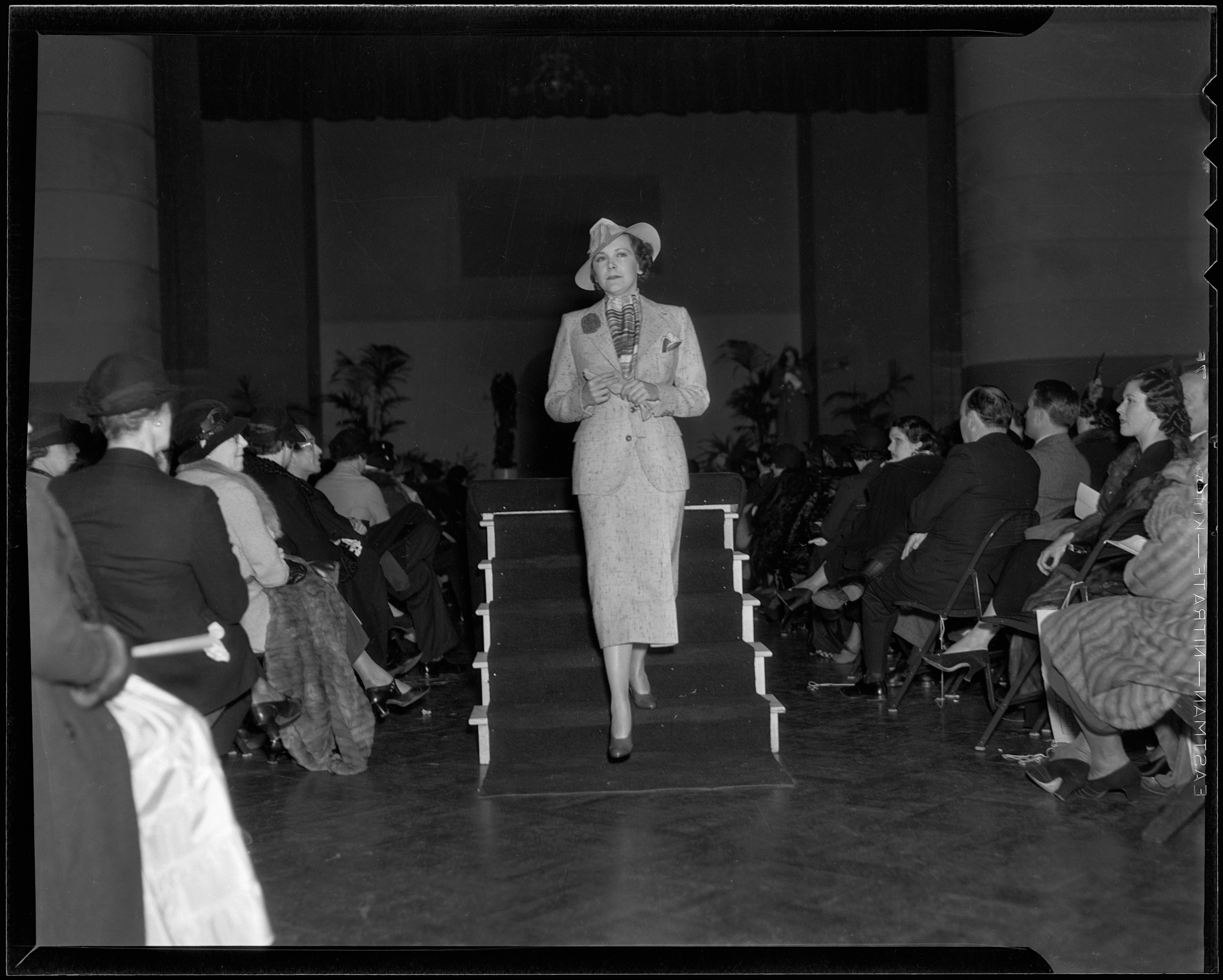
Model in tweed suit

== Death ==
On 29 June 1947, she was found dead in the swimming pool of her home (5119 Bluebell Avenue, North Hollywood) by photographer Robert Landry who lived in West's guest house. Two notes she had left suggested that she had been blackmailed for over 20 years. Her husband was out of town on business at the time of her death and was reported as fully aware of his wife's finances, saying there was "no evidence" of blackmail payments. Mr West also noted he and his wife had fought the previous night and that she was planning to consult her lawyer about a divorce. The exact circumstances of her death were never fully established, although her death certificate lists her death as a "suicide" by "drowning self in pool".

West is buried in Western Great Mausoleum's Niche N°14614 at Forest Lawn Memorial Park in Glendale.

== Legacy ==
West is considered one of the early female pioneers of costume design in the Hollywood industry, in that she was one of the first women to be a studio's chief designer.

West was inducted in to the Costume Designers Guild's of Fame in 2005.

A rare survival of West's early work is a costumed mannequin of Frankenstein's Monster from the 1935 movie Bride of Frankenstein. This was featured in the BBC1 programme Secrets of the Museum in March 2020, where it was being treated by the Victoria & Albert Museum's conservators.

== Filmography (selection) ==
- The Man Who Laughs (1928)

=== 1930s ===
- Dracula (1931)
- The Mummy (1932)
- Bride of Frankenstein (1935)
- Diamond Jim (1935)
- Remember Last Night? (1935)
- Magnificent Obsession (1935)
- Next Time We Love (1936)
- The Magnificent Brute (1936)
- Mad About Music (1938)
- The Rage of Paris (1938)
- The Black Doll (1938)
- That Certain Age (1938)
- Son of Frankenstein (1939)
- You Can't Cheat an Honest Man (1939)
- First Love (1939)
- Tower of London (1939)
- Destry Rides Again (1939)

=== 1940s ===
- The Invisible Man Returns (1940)
- My Little Chickadee (1940)
- Black Friday (1940)
- When the Daltons Rode (1940)
- Spring Parade (1940)
- The Bank Dick (1940)
- The Invisible Woman (1940)
- The House of the Seven Gables (1940)
- This Woman Is Mine (1941)
- Hold That Ghost (1940)
- It Started with Eve (1940)
- Never Give a Sucker an Even Break (1940)
- Appointment for Love (1940)
- The Wolf Man (1940)
- Hellzapoppin' (1941)
- The Ghost of Frankenstein (1942)
- The Spoilers (1942)
- Invisible Agent (1942)
- Pardon My Sarong (1942)
- Sherlock Holmes and the Voice of Terror (1942)
- Sherlock Holmes and the Secret Weapon (1942)
- Arabian Nights (1942)
- Shadow of a Doubt (1943)
- The Amazing Mrs. Holliday (1943)
- Frankenstein Meets the Wolf Man (1943)
- Sherlock Holmes in Washington (1943)
- Hers to Hold (1943)
- Phantom of the Opera (1943)
- Sherlock Holmes Faces Death (1943)
- Flesh and Fantasy (1943)
- Son of Dracula (1943)
- His Butler's Sister (1943)
- Sherlock Holmes and the Spider Woman (1943)
- Ali Baba and the Forty Thieves (1944)
- Phantom Lady (1944)
- Follow the Boys (1944)
- Cobra Woman (1944)
- Christmas Holiday (1944)
- The Pearl of Death (1944)
- The Merry Monahans (1944)
- The House of Frankenstein (1944)
- The Suspect (1944)
- The Woman in Green (1945)

•The Frozen Ghost (1945)

- Pursuit to Algiers (1945)
- Salome, Where She Danced (1945)
- This Love of Ours (1945)
- Terror by Night (1946)
- She-Wolf of London (1946)
- Dressed to Kill (1946)
- Black Angel (1946)
- Magnificent Doll (1946)
- Pirates of Monterey (1947)

== See also ==
List of unsolved deaths
