= Miss America 1941 =

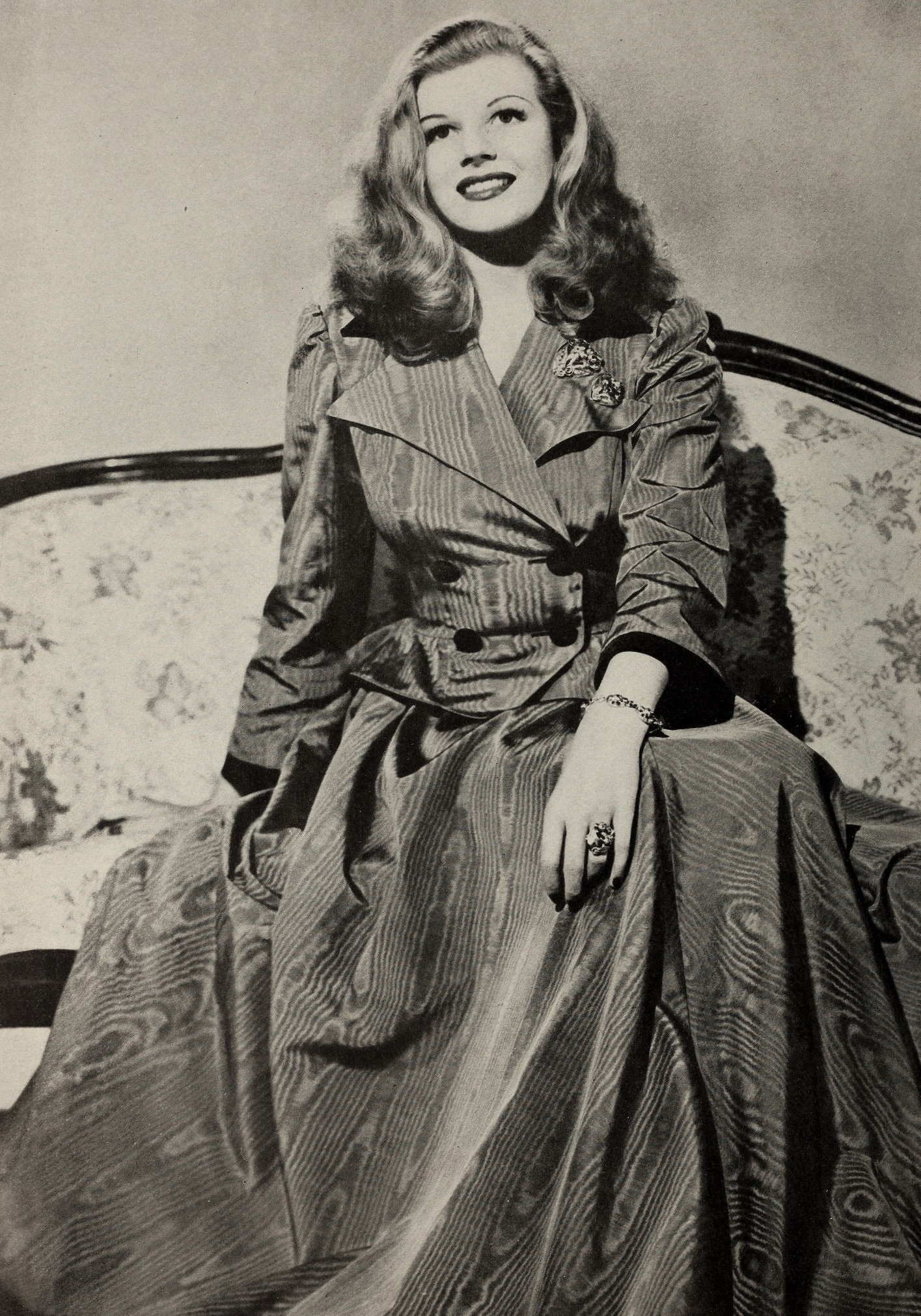
- Date: September 6, 1941
- Presenters: Bob Russell
- Venue: Boardwalk Hall, Atlantic City, New Jersey
- Entrants: 43
- Placements: 15
- Winner: Rosemary LaPlanche; California

Miss America 1941, the 15th Miss America pageant, was held at the Boardwalk Hall in Atlantic City, New Jersey on September 6, 1941. Shortly after the crowning of Miss California, Rosemary LaPlanche, who had been first runner-up in 1940, the pageant committee adopted this rule: "No contestant can compete in Atlantic City for the title of Miss America more than once", thus eliminating future state winners with more than one attempt at the national title.

LaPlanche became a film actress, as did her sister, Louise LaPlanche.

The title of Miss Congeniality went to Mifaunwy Shunatona, a member of the Otoe and Pawnee tribes — she was also the first American Indian contestant in the pageant's history.

== Results ==
=== Placements ===
Placement	Contestant
Miss America 1941	California – Rosemary LaPlanche
1st Runner-Up	Western Pennsylvania – Roselle Marie Hannon
2nd Runner-Up	District of Columbia – Jean Fidelis Cavanaugh
3rd Runner-Up	Westchester County – Lillian Helena O'Donnell
4th Runner-Up	North Carolina – Joey Augusta Paxton
Top 15	Birmingham – Virginia McGraw; Florida – Mitzi Strother; Georgia – Esther Bette Shepard; Kentucky – Dorothy Slatten; Michigan – Gerry Marcoux; New York City – Grace DeWitt; Ohio – Janice Sulzman; Oklahoma – Mifaunwy Dolores Shunatona; Virginia – Jacquelyn McWin; Wisconsin – Betty Ann Miller

=== Awards ===
==== Preliminary awards ====
Award	Contestant
Lifestyle and Fitness	California – Rosemary LaPlanche; Kentucky – Dorothy Slatten; North Carolina – Joey Augusta Paxton (tie); Westchester County – Lillian Helena O'Donnell (tie)
Talent	Birmingham – Virginia McGraw; North Carolina – Joey Augusta Paxton; Western Pennsylvania – Roselle Marie Hannon

=== Other awards ===
Award	Contestant
Miss Congeniality	Oklahoma – Mifaunwy Dolores Shunatona

== Contestants ==
Title	Name	Hometown	Age	Talent	Placement	Awards	Notes
Arkansas	Ferol Amelia Dumas	Magnolia					
Birmingham	Virginia McGraw	Birmingham		Tap Dance with Rope Jumping	Top 15	Preliminary Talent Award	
California	Rosemary LaPlanche	Los Angeles	18	Dance	Winner	Preliminary Lifestyle & Fitness Award	
Charleston	Miriam King	Charleston					
Cleveland	Lois Jean Beck	Cleveland					
Colorado	Charlene Woods	Denver					
Connecticut	Daphne Gladding	Plymouth					
Delaware	Verona Smith	Bridgeville					
(Washington, D.C.) District of Columbia	Jean Cavanaugh		18	Soft Shoe Dance, "A Pretty Girl Is Like a Melody"	2nd Runner-up		
Eastern Pennsylvania	Catherine Jane Albert	Coatesville					
Florida	Mitzie Strother	Miami			Top 15		
(Georgia (U.S. state)) Georgia	Esther Shepard	Griffin			Top 15		
Indiana	Alice Ullery	Evansville		Modeling			
Iowa	Lorene Snoddy	Des Moines	20				
Kentucky	Dorothy Slatten	Lexington			Top 15		
Knoxville	Katherine Gammon	Knoxville					
Lake Mohopac	Charlotte Winstanley						
Maryland	Penny Malone	Baltimore					
Massachusetts	Betsy Sears Taylor	Cambridge					
Miami	Anna Louise Baker	Miami					
Michigan	Gerry Marcoux	Detroit			Top 15		
Minnesota	Patricia Tiets	Minneapolis					
Mississippi	Madeline Smith	Winona					
New Jersey	Marjorie Eleanor Jennings	Dover					
New Mexico	Beverly Brookshier	Roswell					
New Orleans	Helen Yvonne Englert	New Orleans					
New York City	Grace DeWitt	New York City			Top 15		
North Carolina	Joey Augusta Paxton	Charlotte	19	Swing Vocal	4th Runner-up	Preliminary Lifestyle & Fitness Award Preliminary Talent Award	Joey Augusta Paxton of Hallandale Beach, Florida died at 79 on September 17, 2002.
Ohio	Janice Sulzman	Willoughby			Top 15		
Oklahoma	Mifaunwy Dolores Shunatona	Tulsa			Top 15	Miss Congeniality	First American Indian to compete at Miss America
Philadelphia	Carrie de Ludo	Philadelphia					
Savannah	Gladys Collins	Savannah					
South Carolina	Gloria Frances Missel			Vocal, "My Heart Belongs to Daddy"			
Tennessee	Martha McKinney	Nashville		Acrobatic/Tap Dance			
Virginia	Jacquelyn McWin	Waynesboro			Top 15		
West Virginia	Juanita Park Wright	Huntington					
Westchester County	Lillian O'Donnell	Yonkers			3rd Runner-up		
Western Pennsylvania	Roselle Hannon	Pittsburgh		Vocal, "Because of You"	1st Runner-up	Preliminary Talent Award	
Wisconsin	Betty Ann Miller	Milwaukee	18	Artistic Caricature of President Franklin D. Roosevelt	Top 15		
Wyoming	Patricia Marie Snyder	Cheyenne		Vocal & Dance			
