= The Spider Woman Strikes Back =

1946 film by Arthur Lubin

- Theatrical release poster
- Directed by: Arthur Lubin
- Written by: Eric Taylor
- Produced by: Howard Welsch
- Starring: Gale Sondergaard; Brenda Joyce; Milburn Stone; Rondo Hatton
- Cinematography: Paul Ivano
- Edited by: Ray Snyder
- Music by: Milton Rosen
- Production company: Universal Pictures
- Distributed by: Universal Pictures
- Release date: March 22, 1946
- Running time: 59 minutes
- Country: United States
- Language: English

The Spider Woman Strikes Back is a 1946 American horror film starring Gale Sondergaard, with a running time of 59 minutes. Despite the similar title and role played by Sondergaard, the film is not a sequel to the Sherlock Holmes film The Spider Woman. In The Spider Woman, Sondergaard's character is named Adrea Spedding. This time it is Zenobia Dollard.

In 1977 Lubin called the movie one of the three "notable failures" of his career (the others being Successful Failure and Yellowstone) and said he had never seen it.

== Plot ==
A young woman arrives in the small, rural town of Domingo, Nevada to serve as an aide for a blind woman, the area's wealthiest person. Meanwhile, local ranchers are mystified by the inexplicable deaths of their cattle. The young woman becomes entangled in a web of horror as she discovers that her employer, aided by the hideously deformed household servant, has used the blood of her predecessors to feed a toxic South American plant — which in turn is being used to poison the cattle — and that her own blood is now being harvested at night, while she is in a drugged sleep.

== Cast ==
- Gale Sondergaard as Zenobia Dollard
- Brenda Joyce as Jean Kingsley
- Kirby Grant as Hal Wentley
- Milburn Stone as Mr. Moore
- Rondo Hatton as Mario the Monster Man
- Hobart Cavanaugh as Bill Stapleton
- Tom Daly as Sam Julian
- Norman Leavitt as Tom
- Guy Beach as Cal
- Horace Murphy as Angry Older Rancher (uncredited)

Also named in the film's cast were actresses Ruth Robinson, Adda Gleason, Lois Austin, and Eula Guy. However, their roles were omitted from the final cut.

== Production ==
The film was announced in March 1945. It was to be the first in a series starring The Spider Woman, like the ones Universal had for Dracula and Frankenstein. It was the second time Universal had spun off a horror series from their Sherlock Holmes movies, the first being The Creeper from The Pearl of Death. The film was originally called The Spider Woman Strikes Again and was based on an original story by Eric Taylor. Ford Beebe was the original director attached. Much more production information can be found on the Tom Weaver-David Schecter audio commentary on Kino Lorber's 2021 Blu-ray release of the movie.

In September 1945, Universal announced the film would be directed by Arthur Lubin. Lubin said he "hated" the movie and did not want to do it but the studio threatened to put him on suspension otherwise. The lead roles went to Sondegaard, Brenda Joyce, Kirby Grant and Rondo Hatton.

Lubin said "it was a stupid story" and that "I don't think" producer Howard Welsh "liked it any better than I liked it" but that he enjoyed working with Sondegaard.

== Reception ==
Diabolique magazine said the film was "poorly received and helped kill off Universal’s second horror cycle. And it’s a poor movie – a confused script and inadequate casting of support roles are mostly to blame but, it must be admitted, Lubin did not seem to have a particular feel/affinity for horror material. He was probably too upbeat and happy a person – no James Whale gloominess for him."

== Notes ==
- Davis, Roland L. (2005). Just Making Movies: Company Directors on the Studio System. University of Press Mississippi. pp. 181–189. ISBN 9781578066902.
