= The Flying Serpent =

1946 film by Sam Newfield

- Theatrical release poster
- Directed by: Sam Newfield
- Screenplay by: John T. Neville
- Story by: John T. Neville
- Produced by: Sigmund Neufeld
- Starring: George Zucco; Ralph Lewis; Hope Kramer; Eddie Acuff
- Cinematography: Jack Greenhalgh
- Edited by: Holbrook N. Todd
- Music by: Leo Erdody
- Distributed by: Producers Releasing Corporation
- Release date: February 20, 1946 (United States)
- Running time: 59 minutes
- Country: United States
- Language: English

The Flying Serpent is a 1946 American fantasy-horror film based on a story by John T Neville. It follows the deranged archaeologist, Dr Andrew Forbes, as he uses his discovery of a killer bird god, the mythical Quetzalcoatl, to murder his enemies. The film is directed by Sam Newfield and features George Zucco, Ralph Lewis, Hope Kramer and Eddie Acuff. It was telecast to WCBS in New York on Saturday, February 5, 1949.

The film is also known as Killer with Wings (American recut version).

== Plot ==
The opening sequence features an introductory text in the form of a scroll which reads:

Near the little city of San Juan, New Mexico, stand the Aztec ruins. Archeologists tell us they are the remains of a once great temple, abandoned by the Aztecs when they migrated south to the Valley of Mexico, where they founded a rich empire. To defeat the greed of Cortez and his Spanish adventurers who had inaugurated a campaign of loot and murder, the wily Emperor Montezuma hid his fabulous treasure far to the north and implored his native gods to guard it. Among these gods was the feathered serpent---Quetzalcoatl.

The first scene shows Dr. Forbes driving to the cave in which Quetzalcoatl lives. Here he taunts the serpent and, in doing so, explains that Quetzalcoatl has guarded Montezuma's treasure for 300 years. The creature has been imprisoned behind bars by Dr Forbes; it is revealed that this has been the case for 5 years. Forbes takes a feather from Quetzalcoatl and antagonises the beast, remarking that it will kill to have its feather back.

In the next scene, Forbes pretends to unintentionally give the feather to Dr. John Lambert by dropping it on the ground. Lambert, who has recently written an article entitled, "Aztec carving of the legendary bird Quetzalcoatl.", recognises the feather and acknowledging its worth, keeps it. Forbes returns to the cave and releases Quetzalcoatl which then flies in search of its feather. The beast finds Lambert, who by this point has left his office, it kills him, and returns to its cave.

It is revealed that Richard Thorpe will be undertaking an investigation into the death of Dr. Lambert. Upon hearing this Forbes resolves to plant a feather on Thorpe in order to have him killed. In conducting his investigation Thorpe brings up the point that Forbes' late wife died under similar circumstances to Lambert, suggesting that the two murders may be linked and that Forbes may be implicated in them. Forbes plants the feather with the hope that Thorpe will take it, however, Sheriff Bill Hayes spots it first and retrieves it. Forbes returns to the cave and releases Quetzalcoatl to kill Thorpe. However, Hayes is killed as he is in possession of the feather; Thorpe and Hastings are able to spot the beast before it flies off.

== Cast ==
- George Zucco as Prof. Andrew Forbes
- Ralph Lewis as Richard Thorpe
- Hope Kramer as Mary Forbes
- Eddie Acuff as Jerry "Jonsey" Jones
- Wheaton Chambers as Louis Havener
- James Metcalfe as Dr. John Lambert
- Henry Hall as Sheriff Bill Hayes
- Milton Kibbee as Superintendent Hastings
- Budd Buster as Dr. Wagner
- Terry Frost as Vance Bennett

== Reception ==
There was some criticism of the film due to its resemblance to the 1940 movie, The Devil Bat. Notably, author and film critic Leonard Maltin awarded the film two out of four stars, calling it "Basically a reworking of The Devil Bat." American film critic Dennis Schwartz gave the film a grade of "C+" commenting that it is,

A remake of the Devil Bat that offers a slightly different theme and instead of a bat it offers a special effects flying creature (looking harmlessly like a stuffed puppet) that's half bird and half reptile... Sam Newfield shows no imagination or ability...

== See also ==
Q – The Winged Serpent - 1982 film with Quetzalcōātl as antagonist.
