= The Pearl of Death =

1944 American Sherlock Holmes film directed by Roy William Neill

- 1944 Theatrical poster
- Directed by: Roy William Neill
- Screenplay by: Bertram Millhauser
- Based on: The Adventure of the Six Napoleons; 1904 story by Sir Arthur Conan Doyle
- Produced by: Howard Benedict
- Starring: Basil Rathbone; Nigel Bruce; Evelyn Ankers
- Cinematography: Virgil Miller
- Edited by: Ray Snyder
- Music by: Paul Sawtell
- Production company: Universal Pictures
- Distributed by: Universal Pictures
- Release date: August 1, 1944
- Running time: 69 minutes
- Country: United States
- Language: English

The Pearl of Death is a 1944 Sherlock Holmes film starring Basil Rathbone as Holmes and Nigel Bruce as Dr. Watson, the ninth of fourteen such films the pair made. The story is loosely based on Conan Doyle's short story "The Adventure of the Six Napoleons" but features some additions, such as Evelyn Ankers as an accomplice of the villain played by Miles Mander, and Rondo Hatton as a brutal killer.

== Plot ==
Master criminal Giles Conover (Miles Mander) steals the famous "Borgia Pearl" from the Royal Regent Museum under the very nose of Sherlock Holmes and Dr. Watson, but when Mander is caught the pearl is not found on him and he is released.

Later, Holmes hears of an apparently motiveless murder. An elderly colonel is found with his back broken amid a pile of smashed china. Holmes takes an immediate interest in the case as the unusual method of killing is that of "The Hoxton Creeper" (Rondo Hatton), known to be Conover's right-hand man.

Another murder occurs of an old lady, also surrounded by smashed china. Conover makes two attempts to kill Holmes, who surmises that Conover is desperately trying to recover the stolen pearl.

After a third killing, Holmes finds the common feature of each: a bust of Napoleon. Conover, when pursued by the police, had fled through the workshop where the busts were being made and had hidden the pearl inside one of six identical busts.

Holmes tracks down the vendor of the busts and finds out that one is still unaccounted for, as does Conover's accomplice Naomi. Conover and The Creeper arrive at the house of the owner of the final bust, only to find that Holmes has taken the owner's place. Overpowered, Holmes convinces The Creeper that Conover is responsible for the fact that Naomi (whom the Creeper adores) will be hanged. The Creeper turns on Conover and kills him, after which Holmes kills the Creeper before the police finally arrive. Holmes smashes the final bust and recovers the pearl "with the blood of five more victims on it".

== Cast ==
- Basil Rathbone as Sherlock Holmes
- Nigel Bruce as Dr. John H. Watson
- Evelyn Ankers as Naomi Drake
- Dennis Hoey as Inspector Lestrade
- Miles Mander as Giles Conover
- Ian Wolfe as Amos Hodder
- Charles Francis as Digby
- Holmes Herbert as James Goodram
- Richard Nugent as Bates
- Mary Gordon as Mrs. Hudson
- Rondo Hatton as The Creeper
- Wilson Benge as Second Ship's Steward
- Billy Bevan as Constable
- Harry Cording as George Gelder
- Al Ferguson as Security Guard
- Colin Kenny as Security Guard
- Connie Leon as Ellen Carey
- John Merkyl as Doctor Julien Boncourt
- Leyland Hodgson as Customs Officer
- Lillian Bronson as Harker's Housekeeper
- Harold De Becker as Boss
- Leslie Denison as Police Sergeant Murdock
- J.W. Austin as Police Sergeant Bleeker
- Arthur Mulliner as Thomas Sandeford
- Arthur Stenning as First Ship's Steward
- Eric Wilton as Conover's Chauffeur
- Charles Knight as Bearded Man
- Audrey Manners as Body of Teacher

== The Creeper ==
Universal Studios attempted to capitalise on Rondo Hatton's effective portrayal of the Hoxton Creeper, casting him in two more (unrelated) films as "the Creeper": House of Horrors (filmed in 1945, but not released until 1946, after Hatton's death) and The Brute Man (1946, also released posthumously).

A character called "The Golem," a direct reference to the Creeper, appears in the third episode of the first series of Sherlock. Like the Creeper, the Golem is a brutal assassin who crushes his victims with his bare hands.

== See also ==
- Sherlock Holmes (1939 film series)
- Adaptations of Sherlock Holmes in film
