= Louise LaPlanche =

American actress (1919–2012)

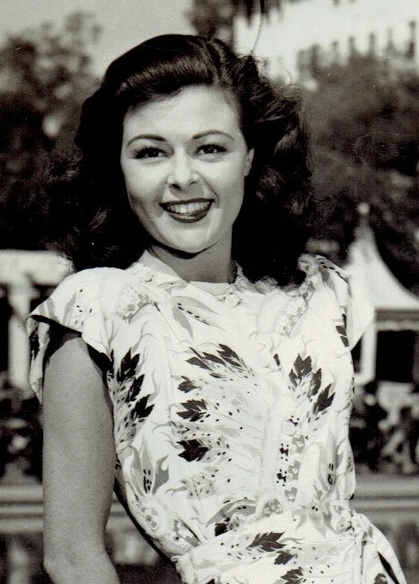
- LaPlanche in 1945
- Born: September 6, 1919
- Died: September 7, 2012 (aged 93); Ann Arbor, Michigan, U.S.
- Occupations: Beauty queen; actress; model
- Years active: 1923-1991
- Title: Miss Catalina 1939
- Spouse: Lester Freedman (?-1984)
- Children: 2
- Relatives: Rosemary LaPlanche

Louise LaPlanche (September 6, 1919 – September 7, 2012) was an American actress most active during the Golden Age of Hollywood from the 1920s to 1940s. LaPlanche made her film debut as in the 1923 silent film, The Hunchback of Notre Dame. LaPlanche was the sister of Rosemary LaPlanche, who was crowned Miss America in 1941.

LaPlanche was born September 6, 1919. She moved from Kansas to California with her mother and sister, Rosemary. LaPlanche made her film debut at the age of three years, portraying a gypsy girl in The Hunchback of Notre Dame in 1923. Both LaPlanche began competing in California beauty pageants. In 1939, Louise LaPlanche was crowned Miss Catalina. Her Miss Catalina win led to a film contract with Metro-Goldwyn-Mayer (MGM). She appeared in the 1940 MGM musical film, Strike Up the Band, which starred Judy Garland and Mickey Rooney.

LaPlanche later left MGM and signed on to Paramount Studios. She was cast in several Paramount films, including 1942's Holiday Inn, which starred Fred Astaire and Bing Crosby, and Road to Morocco, in which she appeared as a harem girl who painted the toenails of the film's star, Bob Hope.

She modeled for her husband, Lester Freedman, a clothing manufacturer. The couple had two children, Phil Freedman and Pat Freedman Johnston. Her husband died in 1984, when LaPlanche was sixty-five years old. LaPlanche returned to acting following her husband's death, appearing in soap operas and other television series, such as The Golden Girls.

LaPlanche moved to Ann Arbor, Michigan, in the late 1990s, and resided there for the last fifteen years of her life. She died on September 7, 2012, just one day after her ninety-third birthday. According to her daughter, LaPlanche had survived several serious illnesses, including a breast cancer diagnosis at the age of 30, a non-smokers lung cancer diagnosis at the age of 60, and colon cancer when she was 90 years old.
