= Frank Wisbar =

German film director (1899–1967)

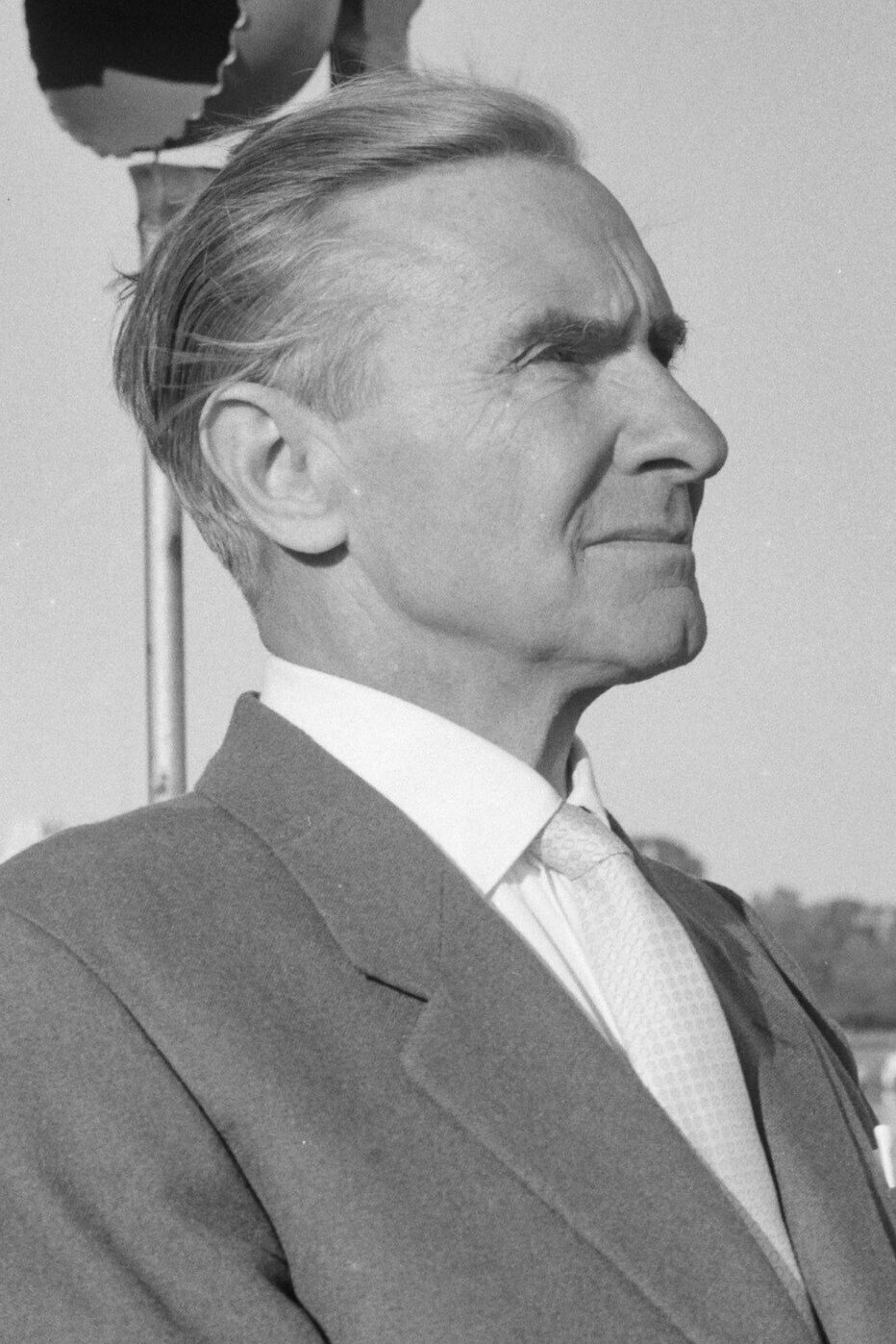
- Wisbar in 1959
- Born: 9 December 1899; Tilsit, East Prussia, German Empire (now Sovetsk, Kaliningrad, Russia)
- Died: 17 March 1967 (aged 67); Mainz, West Germany
- Occupations: Film director, screenwriter
- Years active: 1932–1967

Frank Wisbar (born Franz Wysbar; 9 December 1899 – 17 March 1967) was a German film director and screenwriter. He directed more than 20 films between 1932 and 1967 in Germany and the United States, as well as amassing many television credits. He created the anthology drama series Fireside Theatre and was the show's producer in addition to frequently directing and writing episodes.

He was also a member of the jury at the 10th Berlin International Film Festival.

== Selected filmography ==
- Spell of the Looking Glass (1932)
- Anna and Elizabeth (1933)
- Rivalen der Luft (1934)
- Hermine and the Seven Upright Men (1935) (awarded in the Third Reich, cf. Nazism and cinema)
- The Unknown (1936)
- Fährmann Maria (1936)
- Ball at the Metropol (1937)
- Secrets of a Sorority Girl (1945)
- Strangler of the Swamp (1946)
- Devil Bat's Daughter (1946)
- Lighthouse (1947)
- Haie und kleine Fische (1957)
- Nasser Asphalt (1958)
- Stalingrad: Dogs, Do You Want to Live Forever? (1959)
- Darkness Fell on Gotenhafen (1959)
- Officer Factory (1960)
- Barbara (1961)
- The Legion's Last Patrol (1962)
- Durchbruch Lok 234 (1963)
- S.O.S. – Morro Castle (1966, TV film 2 episdoes)
- Flucht über die Ostsee (1967)
