= The Devil Bat =

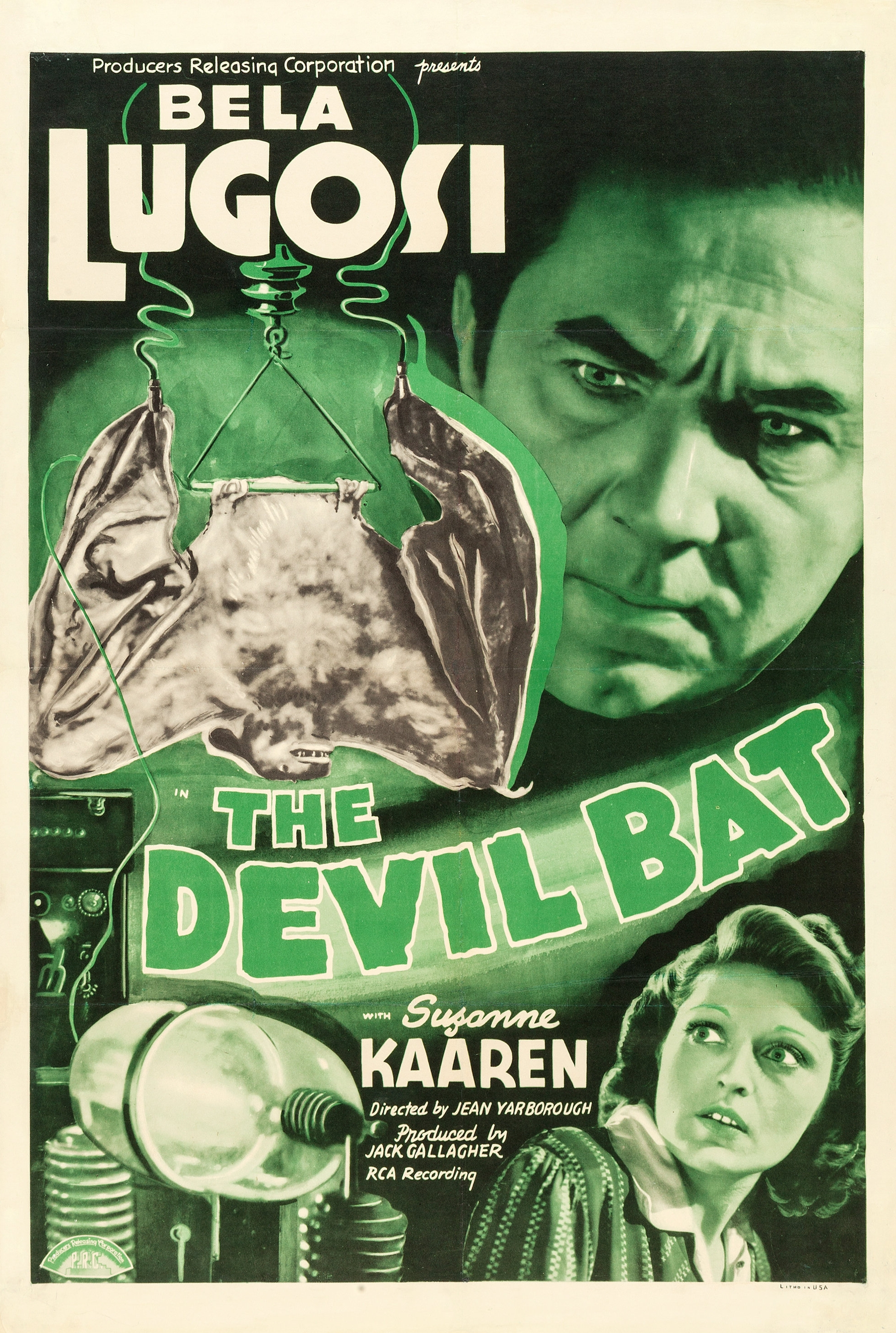
- Theatrical release poster
- Directed by: Jean Yarborough
- Screenplay by: John Thomas Neville
- Based on: original story by George Bricker
- Produced by: Jack Gallagher
- Starring: Bela Lugosi; Suzanne Kaaren
- Cinematography: Arthur Martinelli, A.S.C.
- Edited by: Holbrook N. Todd
- Music by: David Chudnow (musical director)
- Production company: Producers Releasing Corporation
- Distributed by: Producers Releasing Corporation
- Release date: December 13, 1940
- Running time: 68 minutes
- Country: United States
- Language: English

The Devil Bat is a 1940 black-and-white American horror film produced by Producers Releasing Corporation (PRC) and directed by Jean Yarborough. The film stars Bela Lugosi along with Suzanne Kaaren, Guy Usher, Yolande Mallott and the comic team of Dave O'Brien and Donald Kerr as the protagonists. It was the first horror film from PRC.

The Devil Bat (1940), complete film

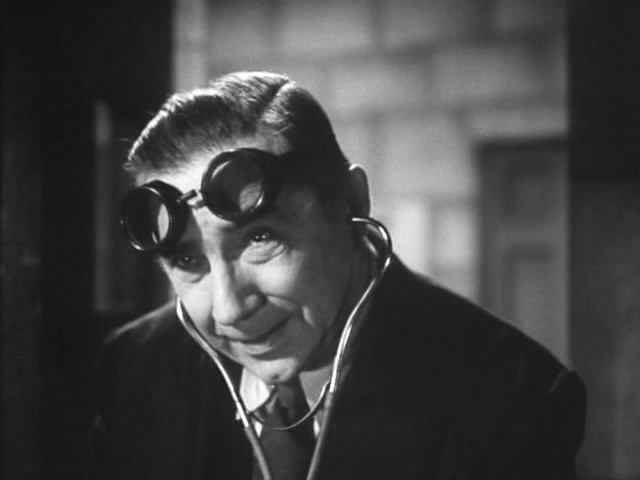
Bela Lugosi as Dr. Paul Carruthers, the mad scientist protagonist of the poverty row horror film The Devil Bat (1940).

== Plot ==
Foreword:

"All Heathville loved Dr. Paul Carruthers, their kindly village doctor.
No one suspected that in his home laboratory on a hillside over-looking the magnificent estate of Martin Heath, the doctor found time to conduct certain private experiments
— weird, terrifying experiments."

Dr. Paul Carruthers, a chemist and physician in the small town of Heathville, is offered a $5,000 bonus from his employers for his contributions to the company, a pittance compared to the million dollars in income the company earned from his work. His employers argue that he took a buyout early in the company's history instead of retaining his partnership stake. Embittered and insulted, he seeks revenge and develops a system in which ordinary bats are enlarged to massive size, training them to be drawn to a new, pungent aftershave he is testing. He then distributes the lotion to his enemies as a "test" product.

Once they have applied the lotion, the chemist then releases his Devil Bats in the night, targeting the families of his employer's owners. The bats succeed in attacking and killing the owner's two sons and his partner. A hot shot reporter from the Chicago Register, Johnny Layton, gets assigned by his editor to cover and help solve the murders. He and his bumbling photographer, "One-Shot" McGuire, begin to unwind the mystery.

In the climactic closing scene, Layton dumps a sample of the aftershave on Carruthers, leading the bat to attack and kill its own master. Mary, the last surviving member of her family, runs into Johnny's arms.

== Cast ==
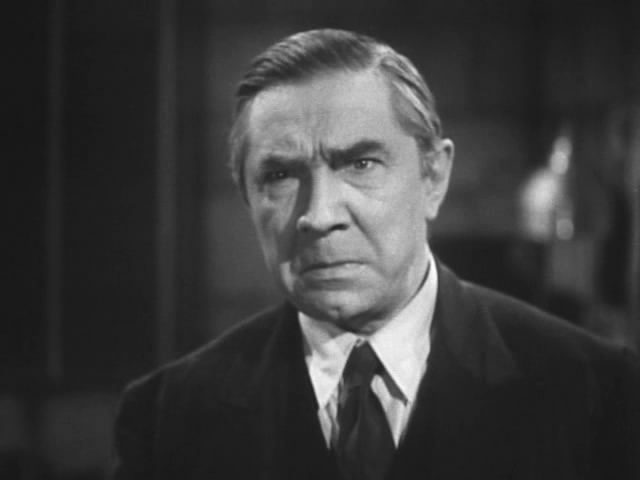
Lugosi in The Devil Bat

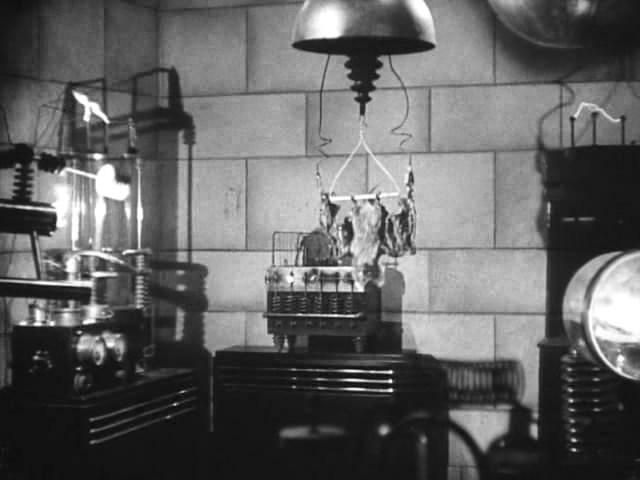
The "devil bat" in Dr. Carruthers's laboratory

- Bela Lugosi as Dr. Paul Carruthers
- Suzanne Kaaren as Mary Heath
- Dave O'Brien as Johnny Layton
- Guy Usher as Henry Morton
- Yolande Mallott as Maxine
- Donald Kerr as "One-Shot" McGuire
- Edward Mortimer as Martin Heath
- Gene O'Donnell as Don Morton
- Alan Baldwin as Tommy Heath
- John Ellis as Roy Heath
- Arthur Q. Bryan as Joe McGinty
- Hal Price as Chief Wilkins
- John Davidson as Prof. Raines
- Billy Griffith as Coroner
- Wally Rairdon as Walter King

== Production ==
PRC was a young studio when it planned to enter the horror film genre, which had been neglected by the major studios during 1937 and 1938. Lugosi was beginning a comeback when he signed a contract on October 19, 1940, with PRC's Sigmund Neufeld to star in the Poverty Row studio's first horror film.

The shooting of the film began a little more than one week later. PRC was known for shooting its films quickly and cheaply, but for endowing them with a plentiful amount of horror, and The Devil Bat established this modus operandi.

== Release ==
Following a premiere on November 11, 1940, The Devil Bat was released theatrically on December 13, receiving wider distribution in to 1941. The film was re-released in 1945 on a double bill with Man Made Monster, described by the Los Angeles Times as "two of the scariest features on the market."

Derek Winnert remarks that upon falling into public domain, truncated and "poorly edited" video and DVD versions of The Devil Bat proliferated. In 1990, the film was restored from original 35mm elements by Bob Furmanek and released on laserdisc by Lumivision. In 2008, Furmanek supplied his original elements to Legend Films, which performed a new restoration and also created a computer-colorized version. Both the restored black-and-white and colorized versions were subsequently released on DVD.

In 2013, the film was released on Blu-ray by Kino Lorber under its Kino Classics label, with commentary by Richard Harland Smith.

== Reception ==
=== Box office ===
One of PRC's first horror movies, The Devil Bat was the studio's greatest horror box-office success.

=== Critical response ===
On the review aggregator web site Rotten Tomatoes, the film has a score of 60% based on ten reviews.

In his 1993 book Poverty Row Horrors!, Tom Weaver calls The Devil Bat one of Lugosi's best films for the studio.

=== Evaluation in film guides ===
In his 1983 film guide The Psychotronic Encyclopedia of Film, Michael Weldon described it as "A wonderfully ridiculous chiller from the cheapest studio in the business. Bela says a cheery good-bye to his victims after making sure they sample his lotion." The 1998 edition of Leonard Maltin's Movie & Video Guide gives it 2 stars (out of 4) and states that it is "One of Lugosi's more notorious pictures, and fairly entertaining,"

== Remake ==
The studio remade the film, differing in almost every respect, as The Flying Serpent in 1946, starring George Zucco.

== Sequels ==
PRC's 1946 film Devil Bat's Daughter starred Rosemary LaPlanche as Paul Carruthers's daughter. Neither Lugosi nor any other actors reprise their roles; Carruthers is an unseen character in the latter film. In contrast to the horror elements of the original, Devil Bat's Daughter was mainly a psychological thriller.

In 2015 Indie filmmaker Ted Moehring directed the sequel Revenge of the Devil Bat, which stars Lynn Lowry, Ruby Larocca and veteran actors Gary Kent, John Link, Dick Dyszel, George Stover, and Conrad Brooks.

== See also ==
- Bela Lugosi filmography
