= House of Horrors =

1946 film by Jean Yarbrough

- Theatrical release poster
- Directed by: Jean Yarbrough
- Screenplay by: George Bricker
- Story by: Dwight V. Babcock
- Produced by: Ben Pivar
- Starring: Rondo Hatton; Bill Goodwin; Robert Lowery; Virginia Grey; Martin Kosleck; Alan Napier; Joan Fulton
- Cinematography: Maury Gertsman
- Edited by: Philip Cahn
- Production company: Universal Pictures Company, Inc.
- Distributed by: Universal Pictures Company, Inc.
- Release dates: 22 February 1946 (New York); 29 March 1946
- Running time: 66 minutes
- Country: United States
- Language: English

House of Horrors (also known as Murder Mansion and Joan Bedford Is Missing) is a 1946 American horror film released by Universal Pictures, starring Rondo Hatton, Martin Kosleck and Robert Lowery. The screenplay was by George Bricker from an original story by Dwight V. Babcock. A sculptor enlists the assistance of a madman to kill his critics.

== Plot ==
Struggling sculptor Marcel de Lange is depressed about events in his life, and decides to commit suicide. Just as he is about to kill himself, he sees a madman known as "the Creeper" in the process of drowning and saves him. Taking the disfigured man into his care, he makes him the subject of his next sculpture and calls it his best creation. When critics denigrate Marcel's work, he has the Creeper start killing them. Marcel becomes obsessed with Joan, a beautiful female art critic. When Marcel invites her over and she sees Marcel's sculpture of the Creeper, she suspects that Marcel knows the killer. Later, Marcel decides that Joan knows too much and commands the Creeper to kill her. The Creeper is reluctant to do so; however, when he discovers that Marcel plans to turn him over to the police, the Creeper kills Marcel, and is about to kill Joan when he is shot by the police.

== Cast ==
- Rondo Hatton as the Creeper
- Martin Kosleck as Marcel de Lange
- Robert Lowery as Steven Morrow
- Virginia Grey as Joan Medford
- Bill Goodwin as Lieutenant Larry Brooks
- Alan Napier as F. Holmes Harmon
- Howard Freeman as Hal Ormiston
- Virginia Christine as lady of the streets
- Joan Shawlee as Stella McNally (as Joan Fulton)
- Byron Foulger as Mr. Samuels (uncredited)

== Production ==
On November 8, 1944, an article in The Hollywood Reporter stated that producer Ben Pivar was relieved of all his lower-budget films on his shooting schedule and was going to focus on a larger budget film featuring new horror characters. This included a series featuring actor Rondo Hatton as "the Creeper". The authors of Universal Horrors suggested this report of a higher budget was either fabricated or the state of the production changed when House of Horrors was developed, it did not have a larger budget than the average Universal B-film production.

Initial shooting for House of Horrors began on September 11. Initially Kent Taylor was selected to play the part of Police Lt. Larry Brooks, but on the fourth day of production, before he was shot in any scenes, he was replaced by Bill Goodwin. Taylor stated years later that he did play the role in the film, but disliked how the picture exploited actor Rondo Hatton, and demanded to be taken off the film. The assistant director's daily reports suggest that this story was a lie, stating that Goodwin was the only person to play Brooks on set. Actress Virginia Christine recalled her brief role in the film, stating "I needed the money [laughs] – all actors need money!". Her only other recollection of the film was that to get a cat to follow her, they put anchovies or sardines on the back of her heel. The scene with the cat is not in the final film. Martin Kosleck was asked to audition for the role while on the Universal lot. He received the script to study during the lunch hour for an audition, and was offered the part immediately after. Kosleck was particularly proud of his performance in the film, stating he received fan mail for it and he "loved that part". Filming ended on September 25, 1945.

== Release ==
House of Horrors was shown in New York on February 22, 1946 and received wider release by Universal Pictures on March 29. A series of Creeper films was planned, and the second one, The Brute Man, was filmed in 1946. Hatton died of complications from acromegaly before either film was released.House of Horrors was released on DVD by the Willette Acquisition Corp. on Sep 27, 2013. It was released on Blu-ray by Shout! Factory on March 17, 2020, as the fourth volume in their Universal Horror Collection. The set also included Night Key (1937), Night Monster (1942) and The Climax (1944).

== Reception ==
From contemporary reviews, many critics commented on Rondo Hatton, with George H. Spires stating that his "Neanderthal features suffice without the aid of make up [...] and his ape-like appearance on the screen brings a gasp to the audience", while Edmond J. Bartnett of The New York Times said Hatton was "properly scary". Otis L. Guernsey Jr. of The New York Herald-Tribune found the Creeper to be "not in the best of taste".

As for the picture overall, a reviewer in Harrison's Reports wrote that "little about the proceedings to horrify one unless the fact that murders are committed by a half-witted giant can be considered horrendous rather than unpleasant".

The Monthly Film Bulletin wrote: "The plot is fantastic, but not so fantastic as to be completely impossible, and the cast act convincingly enough. Rondo Hatton is grotesque and gorilla-like in his portrayal of the Creeper. Martin Kosleck is good as de Lange, his moments of insane hatred contrasting well with his more gentle moods."

From retrospective reviews, the authors of the book Universal Horrors found that, despite Rondo Hatton's acting and characters in the film being cliches, House of Horrors "rates as the best shocker in this last grap of Universal Horrors. It boasts creepy, atmospheric, film-noirish settings, evocative camerawork and is seldom dull".

In Leonard Maltin's film guide, the film was awarded two out of four stars, criticizing the script as "laughable" and moderate acting, calling it "[a] slightly below average horror meller".

== Prequel ==
A prequel called The Brute Man was released on October 1, 1946.

== See also ==
- List of Universal Pictures films (1940–1949)
- List of horror films of the 1940s
