= George Bricker =

American screenwriter (1898–1955)

- Born: July 18, 1898; St. Mary's, Ohio, United States
- Died: January 22, 1955 (aged 56); Los Angeles, California, United States
- Occupation: Writer
- Years active: 1935-1954 (film)

George Bricker (1898–1955) was an American screenwriter. He generally worked on second features at studios such as Warner Bros., Columbia, Universal and Monogram.

== Selected filmography ==
- Broadway Hostess (1935)
- The Widow from Monte Carlo (1936)
- Love Is on the Air (1937)
- Melody for Two (1937)
- Sh! The Octopus (1937)
- Torchy Blane in Panama (1938)
- Over the Wall (1938)
- Torchy Blane in Chinatown (1939)
- Mr. Moto in Danger Island (1939)
- They Made Her a Spy (1939)
- Women in the Wind (1939)
- The Devil Bat (1940)
- The Blonde from Singapore (1941)
- Frisco Lil (1942)
- Little Tokyo, U.S.A. (1942)
- A Man's World (1942)
- Lure of the Islands (1942)
- The Dancing Masters (1943)
- House of Dracula (1945)
- Meet Me on Broadway (1946)
- House of Horrors (1946)
- She-Wolf of London (1946)
- The Corpse Came C.O.D. (1947)
- Beauty on Parade (1950)
- The Whip Hand (1951)
- Roadblock (1951)
- Man in the Dark (1953)
- Tangier Incident (1953)
- Loophole (1954)
- Cry Vengeance (1954)

== Bibliography ==
- Blottner, Gene. Columbia Pictures Movie Series, 1926-1955: The Harry Cohn Years. McFarland, 2011.
