= Rondo Hatton =

American actor (1894–1946)

- Hatton's acromegalic features made him a Hollywood horror film icon.
- Born: April 22, 1894; Hagerstown, Maryland, U.S.
- Died: February 2, 1946 (aged 51); Beverly Hills, California, U.S.
- Resting place: American Legion Cemetery, Tampa, Florida
- Occupations: Journalist, actor
- Years active: 1927–1946
- Employer: The Tampa Tribune
- Spouses: Elizabeth Immell James (m. 1926; div. 1930) Mabel Housh (m. 1934–1946)

Rondo Hatton (April 22, 1894 – February 2, 1946) was an American journalist and actor. After writing for The Tampa Tribune, Hatton found a career in film due to his unique facial features, which were the result of acromegaly. He headlined horror films with Universal Studios near the end of his life, earning him a reputation as a cult icon.

== Early years ==
Hatton was born in the Kee Mar College girls' infirmary in Hagerstown, Maryland. The family moved several times during Hatton's youth before settling in Tampa, Florida. He starred in track and football at Hillsborough High School and was voted Handsomest Boy in his class his senior year.

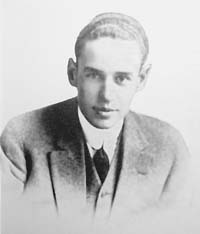
Rondo Hatton as he appeared in the 1913 Hillsborough High School yearbook

In Tampa, Hatton worked as a sportswriter for The Tampa Tribune. He continued working as a journalist until after World War I, when the symptoms of acromegaly developed. Acromegaly distorted the shape of Hatton's head, face, and extremities in a gradual but consistent process. He eventually became severely disfigured by the disease. Because the symptoms developed in adulthood (as is common with the disorder), the disfigurement was incorrectly attributed later by film studio publicity departments to elephantiasis resulting from exposure to a German mustard gas attack during service in World War I. Hatton served in combat and served on the Pancho Villa Expedition along the Mexican border and in France during World War I with the United States Army, from which he was discharged due to his illness.

== Career ==
Director Henry King noticed Hatton when he was working as a reporter with The Tampa Tribune covering the filming of Hell Harbor (1930) and hired him for a small role. After some hesitation, Hatton moved to Hollywood in 1936 to pursue a career playing similar, often uncredited, bit and extra roles. His most notable of these was as a contestant-extra in the "ugly man competition" (which he loses to a heavily made-up Charles Laughton) in the RKO production of The Hunchback of Notre Dame. He had another supporting-character role as Gabe Hart, a member of the lynch mob in the 1943 film of The Ox-Bow Incident.

Universal Studios used Hatton's unusual features to promote him as a horror star after he played the part of The Hoxton Creeper (aka The Hoxton Horror) in the studio's ninth Sherlock Holmes film, The Pearl of Death (1944). He made two films playing "the Creeper", House of Horrors and The Brute Man, which were both filmed in 1945 but not released until after his death in 1946.

== Death ==
Around Christmas 1945, Hatton suffered a series of heart attacks, a direct result of his acromegalic condition. On February 2, 1946, he suffered a fatal heart attack at his home on South Tower Drive in Los Angeles. His body was transported to Florida and interred at the American Legion Cemetery in Tampa.

== Legacy ==
Hatton's name – and face – have become recurring humorous motifs in popular culture. In season 6, episode 4 of the 1970s television series The Rockford Files ("Only Rock-n-Roll Will Never Die, part 1"), Jim Rockford, exasperated at a friend who dismisses himself as unattractive, exclaims "You're no Rondo Hatton!" Hatton's physical likeness inspired the Lothar character in Dave Stevens's 1980s Rocketeer Adventure Magazine stories, and in Disney's 1991 film version, The Rocketeer, in which the character is played by actor Tiny Ron in prosthetic make-up.

The Scooby Doo cartoon series character The Creeper, who vaguely resembles Frankenstein's Monster, is likely based on Universal Studios' own "Creeper" from the 1946 film The House of Horrors, who was portrayed by Rondo Hatton, with Scooby Doo's Creeper seemingly being a caricature of Rondo in terms of hand size and facial features.

The 2000 AD comic book character Judge Dredd, who is rarely seen without his helmet, used "face-changing technology" to make himself look like Hatton in issue 52 (February 18, 1978) – the first time the character's face was shown unobscured. The name "Rondo Hatton" was also in a list of suspects obtained by Dredd during the case. As the artist Brian Bolland revealed in an interview with David Bishop: "The picture of Dredd's face – that was a 1940s actor called Rondo Hatton. I've only seen him in one film." Additionally, the character The Creep in the Dark Horse Presents comic-book series strongly resembled Hatton.

Hatton is regularly name-checked in the novels of Robert Rankin, often referred to as "the now-legendary Rondo Hatton" and credited as appearing in films that are either fictional, or in which he clearly had no part, such as the Carry On films. Rankin's references to Hatton routinely occur in the form of "he had a Rondo Hatton" (hat on). Another namecheck occurs in Rafi Zabor's PEN/Faulkner-award-winning 1998 novel The Bear Comes Home, where the name is used as a nickname for good-natured but unrefined minor character Tommy Talmo. In the 2004 Stephen King novel, The Dark Tower VII, a character is described as looking "like Rondo Hatton, a film actor from the 1930s, who suffered from acromegaly and got work playing monsters and psychopaths". In the 1991 movie The Rocketeer, actor Tiny Ron Taylor, playing Nazi henchman Lothar, is made up with prosthetics to look like Hatton. The episode of Doctor Who entitled "The Wedding of River Song" features Mark Gatiss as a character whose appearance (achieved through prosthetics) is based on Hatton's, credited under the pseudonym Rondo Haxton for his performance.

A documentary produced in 2017, Rondo and Bob, and released in 2020, looks at the lives of Hatton and The Texas Chain Saw Massacre art director Robert A. Burns, a self-described expert on Hatton.

The Dark Horse comic The Creep focuses on Oxel Karnhus, a private detective with acromegaly, who was modelled after Hatton and his "Creeper" character.

The full story of Hatton's life is told in the Scott Gallinghouse book Rondo Hatton: Beauty Within the Brute (BearManor Media, 2019), which also includes exhaustive production histories of his Universal horror films.

=== Rondo Hatton Awards ===
Since 2002, the Rondo Hatton Classic Horror Awards have paid tribute to Hatton in name and likeness. The physical award is a representation of Hatton's face, based on the bust of "The Creeper", whom Hatton portrayed in the 1946 Universal Pictures film House of Horrors.

== Filmography ==
Year	Title	Role	Notes
1927	Uncle Tom's Cabin	Slave	Uncredited
1929	Jungle Drums	Shadow	Uncredited
1930	Hell Harbor	Dance Hall Bouncer	Uncredited
1931	Safe in Hell	Jury Member	Uncredited
1936	Wolves of the Sea	Bar Proprietor	Uncredited (stock footage from Hell Harbor)
1938	In Old Chicago	Rondo	
1938	Alexander's Ragtime Band	Barfly	Uncredited
1939	Captain Fury	Convict Sitting on Floor	Uncredited
1939	The Big Guy	Convict	Uncredited
1939	The Hunchback of Notre Dame	Ugly Man	Uncredited
1940	Moon Over Burma	Sailor	Uncredited
1940	Chad Hanna	Canvasman	Uncredited
1942	It Happened in Flatbush	Baseball Game Spectator	Uncredited
1942	The Cyclone Kid	Townsman	Uncredited
1942	Tales of Manhattan	Party Guest	Uncredited
1942	The Moon and Sixpence	The Leper	Uncredited
1942	Sin Town	Townsman	Uncredited
1942	The Black Swan	Sailor	Uncredited
1943	The Ox-Bow Incident	Gabe Hart	Uncredited
1943	Sleepy Lagoon	Hunchback	Uncredited
1944	Johnny Doesn't Live Here Anymore	Graves	Uncredited
1944	The Pearl of Death	The Hoxton Creeper	
1944	The Princess and the Pirate	Gorilla	Uncredited
1945	The Jungle Captive	Moloch the Brute	
1945	The Royal Mounted Rides Again	Bull Andrews	
1946	The Spider Woman Strikes Back	Mario the Monster Man	
1946	House of Horrors	The Creeper	
1946	The Brute Man	Hal Moffat/The Creeper	
