= Rosemary LaPlanche =

American actress (1923–1979)

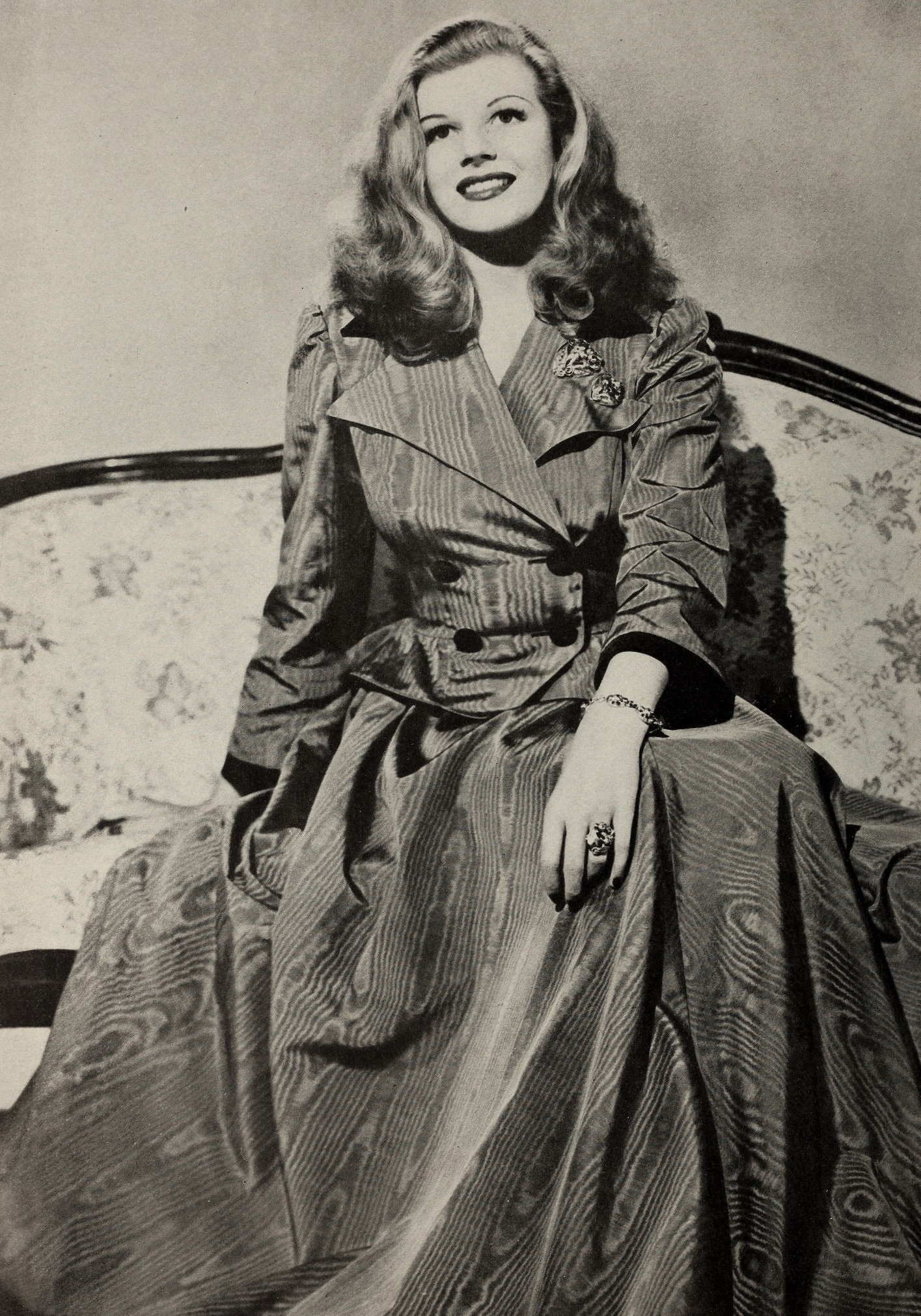
- LaPlanche in 1943
- Born: Rosemary E. LaPlanche; October 11, 1923; Kansas, U.S.
- Died: May 6, 1979 (aged 55); Glendale, California, U.S.
- Resting place: San Fernando Mission Cemetery
- Occupations: Beauty queen; actress; model
- Years active: 1930–1961
- Title: Miss America 1941
- Spouse: Harry Koplan (m. 1947; died 1973)
- Children: 2
- Relatives: Louise LaPlanche (sister)

Rosemary E. LaPlanche (October 11, 1923 – May 6, 1979) was an American beauty queen and actress. She won Miss California three years in a row (1939–1941), and won Miss America in 1941.

== Early life ==
LaPlanche moved to southern California from Kansas with her mother and sister, Louise LaPlanche, at a very early age.

== Career ==
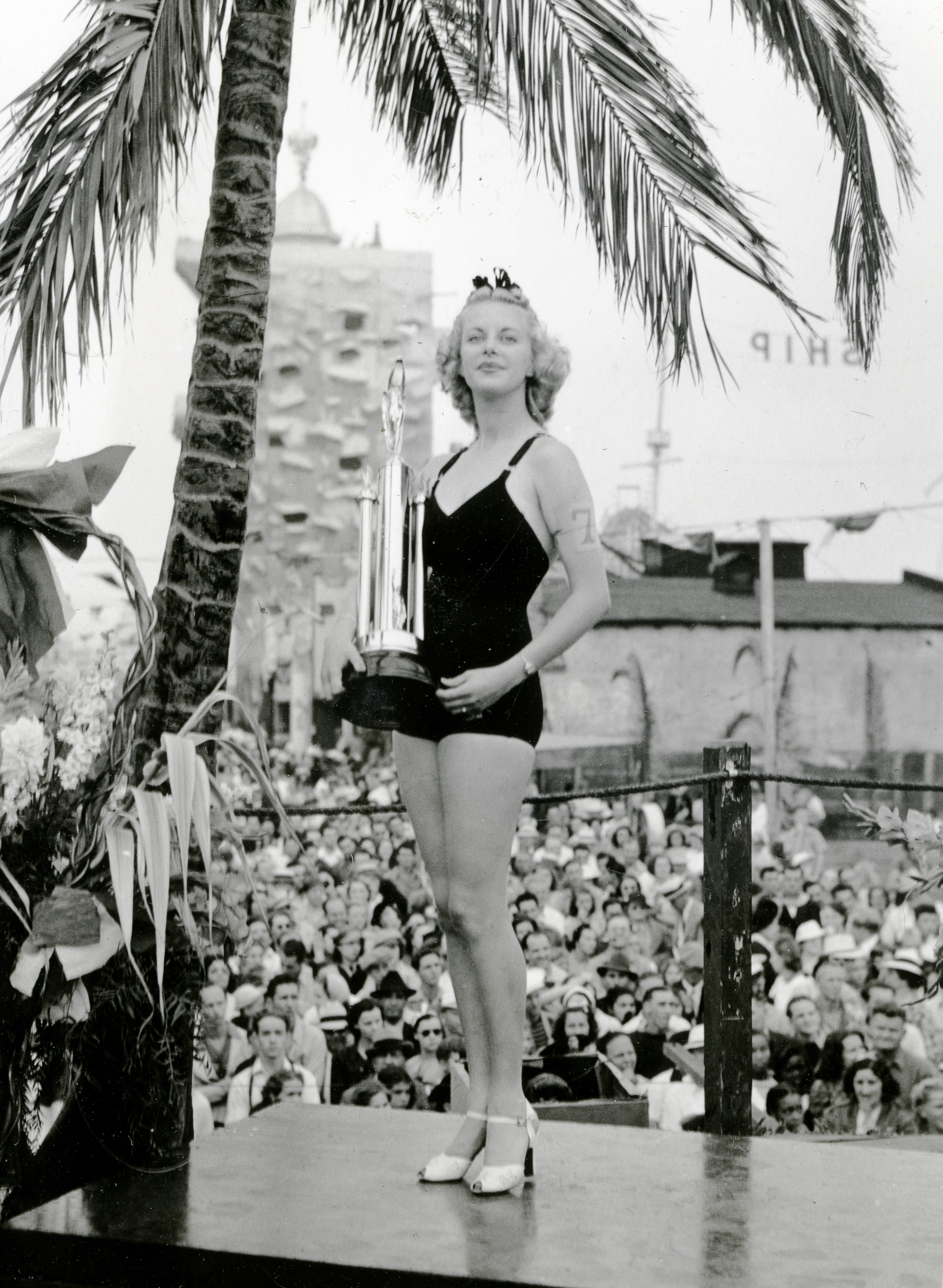
Rosemary LaPlanche Miss California 1940

LaPlanche, who lived in Los Angeles, was Miss California in 1939, 1940 and 1941.

She was a finalist in 1939 and runner-up to Miss America in 1940. A new rule after her victory disallowed contestants from competing at the national level more than once.

LaPlanche became an actress, signing with RKO after she won the Miss America title. She appeared in films such as Angels' Alley and in episodes of television programs like The Donna Reed Show. She and her husband had a daily TV program, the Harry Koplan-Rosemary LaPlanche Show, on KHJ in Hollywood.

LaPlanche also worked as a model

In the 1960s, LaPlanche acted on a long-time interest and began to paint. She began by buying a book on art and a set of paints, and she later took lessons. She described her work as "impressionistic — just this side of realistic". Subjects of her works included birds, deserts, flowers, seashores, sheep, and people. In 1969, her paintings sold for prices ranging from $35 to $600,.

== Personal life and death ==
She was married to Harry Koplan from 1947 until his death in 1973, and had two children: a daughter Carol and son Terry. She died from cancer in 1979, aged 55. She is interred in San Fernando Mission Cemetery.

== Partial filmography ==
- One Hundred Men and a Girl (1937) - Girl (uncredited)
- Mad About Music (1938) - Schoolgirl (uncredited)
- Irene (1940) - Charity Ball Guest (uncredited)
- Fall In (1942) - Canteen Girl (uncredited)
- Two Weeks to Live (1943) - Miss LaPlanche, Dr. O'Brien's Nurse
- Prairie Chickens (1943) - Yola
- Swing Your Partner (1943) - Secretary
- The Falcon in Danger (1943) - Falcon's Nurse (uncredited)
- Mexican Spitfire's Blessed Event (1943) - Minor Role (uncredited)
- Gildersleeve on Broadway (1943) - Model (uncredited)
- The Falcon and the Co-eds (1943) - Co-Ed (uncredited)
- Around the World (1943) - Rosemary (uncredited)
- The Falcon Out West (1944) - Mary (uncredited)
- Show Business (1944) - Chorine (uncredited)
- Step Lively (1944) - Louella, 'Daughter' in Rehearsal (uncredited)
- Mademoiselle Fifi (1944) - Amanda (uncredited)
- Youth Runs Wild (1944) - Blanche (uncredited)
- None but the Lonely Heart (1944) - Dancer (uncredited)
- Heavenly Days (1944) - Minor Role (uncredited)
- Girl Rush (1944) - Troupe Member (uncredited)
- What a Blonde (1945) - Showgirl (uncredited)
- Pan-Americana (1945) - Pan-American Girl (uncredited)
- Having Wonderful Crime (1945) - Guest (uncredited)
- Zombies on Broadway (1945) - Entertainer in Sarong (uncredited)
- George White's Scandals (1945) - Showgirl (uncredited)
- Johnny Angel (1945) - Hatcheck Girl (uncredited)
- Strangler of the Swamp (1946) - Maria Hart
- Devil Bat's Daughter (1946) - Nina MacCarron
- Betty Co-Ed (1946) - Glenda Warren
- Jack Armstrong (1947, Serial) - Betty Fairfield
- Angels' Alley (1948) - Daisy Harris
- An Old-Fashioned Girl (1949) - Emma Davenport
- Federal Agents vs. Underworld, Inc. (1949) - Laura Keith

Awards and achievements
Preceded by Frances Marie Burke	Miss America; 1941	Succeeded by Jo-Carroll Dennison
Preceded by Marguerite Skliris	Miss California; 1940 & 1941	Succeeded by Lucille Lambert
