= Shock Theater =

- No. of episodes: 52

Production
- Production company: Screen Gems

Original release
- Release: 1957

Shock Theater (marketed as Shock!) is a package of 52 pre-1948 classic horror films from Universal Studios released for television syndication in October 1957 by Screen Gems, the television subsidiary of Columbia Pictures. The Shock Theater package included Dracula, Frankenstein, The Mummy, The Invisible Man and The Wolf Man as well as a few non-horror spy and mystery films. A second package, Son of Shock, was released for television by Screen Gems in 1958, with 20 horror films from both Universal and Columbia.

== Horror hosts ==
Shock Theater usually aired on late night television on weekends, and in many markets was introduced by a costumed horror host; a well-known example was Zacherley (John Zacherle) on Philadelphia's WCAU-TV (as 'Roland') in 1957–58, and New York's WABC-TV in 1958–59. Prior to Zacherely's arrival at WABC-TV, Shock Theater was hosted off-camera by ABC staff announcer Scott Vincent and three other ABC staff announcers who worked in rotation. Shock Theater continued the American tradition of horror film television shows that originated with Vampira (Maila Nurmi) at Los Angeles KABC-TV in 1954–55. Shock Theater programs in major cities were often introduced by local hosts in the style of Zacherley or Vampira such as Terry Bennett's Marvin on Chicago's WBKB-TV. With the varying lengths of the features ranging from the 58 minutes of The Cat Creeps to the 99 minute Son of Frankenstein, the host's sequences could pad out the broadcast to a standard time slot.

Screen Gems acquired a 10-year lease of the television rights to 550 Universal Pictures features in June 1957, with the intention of packaging them by formats and stars, including horror, crime, and comedy. The first Shock package was an instant success nationwide. Viewership measurements in five key television markets (New York, Los Angeles, San Francisco, Philadelphia, San Antonio) showed the program boosting ratings anywhere from 38 percent to 1,125 percent.

== Films ==
=== Shock Theater ===
Films sourced from the book Universal Horrors.

- Dracula (1931)
- Frankenstein (1931)
- Murders in the Rue Morgue (1932)
- The Mummy (1932)
- The Secret of the Blue Room (1933)
- The Invisible Man (1933)
- The Black Cat (1934)
- Secret of the Chateau (1934)
- The Mystery of Edwin Drood (1935)
- The Raven (1935)
- The Great Impersonation (1935)
- Werewolf of London (1935)
- Chinatown Squad (1935)
- The Invisible Ray (1936)
- Dracula's Daughter (1936)
- Night Key (1937)
- The Man Who Cried Wolf (1937)
- Reported Missing! (1937)
- The Spy Ring (1938)
- The Last Warning (1938)
- Son of Frankenstein (1939)
- Mystery of the White Room (1939)
- The Witness Vanishes (1939)
- The Invisible Man Returns (1940)
- Enemy Agent (1940)
- The Mummy's Hand (1940)
- Man-Made Monster (1941)
- A Dangerous Game (1941)
- Horror Island (1941)
- Sealed Lips (1942)
- The Wolf Man (1941)
- The Mad Doctor of Market Street (1942)
- The Strange Case of Doctor Rx (1942)
- Night Monster (1942)
- The Mystery of Marie Roget (1942)
- The Mummy's Tomb (1942)
- Nightmare (1942)
- Destination Unknown (1942)
- Frankenstein Meets the Wolf Man (1943)
- The Mad Ghoul (1943)
- Son of Dracula (1943)
- Calling Dr. Death (1943)
- The Mummy's Ghost (1944)
- Weird Woman (1944)
- Dead Man's Eyes (1944)
- The Frozen Ghost (1945)
- Pillow of Death (1945)
- House of Horrors (1946)
- She-Wolf of London (1946)
- The Spider Woman Strikes Back (1946)
- The Cat Creeps (1946)
- Danger Woman (1946)

=== Son of Shock ===
- Before I Hang (1940)
- Behind the Mask (1932)
- Black Friday (1940)
- The Black Room (1935)
- The Boogie Man Will Get You (1942)
- Bride of Frankenstein (1935)
- Captive Wild Woman (1943)
- The Devil Commands (1941)
- The Face Behind the Mask (1941)
- The Ghost of Frankenstein (1942)
- House of Dracula (1945)
- House of Frankenstein (1944)
- The Invisible Man's Revenge (1944)
- Island of Doomed Men (1940)
- Jungle Captive (1945)
- The Man They Could Not Hang (1939)
- The Man Who Lived Twice (1936)
- The Man with Nine Lives (1940)
- The Mummy's Curse (1944)
- Night of Terror (1933)

== See also ==
- Chiller Theatre
- Creature Features
