= The Inner Sanctum Mysteries (film series) =

American film series

- Official film series logo
- Based on: Inner Sanctum Mystery by Himan Brown Inner Sanctum Mysteries by Simon & Schuster
- Starring: Lon Chaney Jr.
- Production company: Universal Pictures
- Distributed by: Universal Pictures
- Country: United States
- Language: English

The Inner Sanctum Mysteries film series consists of American classic-horror mystery films, based on and inspired by the works of Himan Brown, and the stories printed by Simon & Schuster.

The anthological film series as a part of the Universal Horror label, stars Lon Chaney Jr. in a number of similar roles, with plots that do not overlap though they are thematically related. David Hoffman features in each installment as a disembodied head, which floats within a crystal ball and warns the audience that someone in attendance could be a murderer.

The series was released on home video as a collection through various packagings, in 2006.

== Origin ==
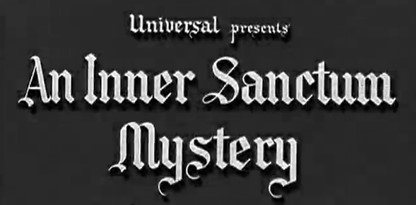
Installments of the film series, began with a title card provided by Universal Pictures with the sub-title An Inner Sanctum Mystery.

The film series originated from the Golden Age radio dramas titled Inner Sanctum and created by Himan Brown; which were in turn based on the Simon & Schuster imprint of the same name. Though the novels are generally associated with mysteries, the imprint was additionally used for drama and romance; with each genre being published in green, blue, and red colored book covers, respectively. Broadcast through Blue Network Programs via radio from January 7, 1941 – October 5, 1952 the series included a total of 511 episodes.

=== Development and production ===
In June 1943, Universal struck a deal with Simon & Schuster Inc. for the name "Inner Sanctum". The stories in the series are not based on the narratives found in the pulp novels, nor the radio play adaptations.

Ben Pivar oversaw the production of the series. Initially, Pivar was hired to produce two Inner Sanctum Mystery films each year, with each installment starring Lon Chaney, Jr. and Gale Sondergaard. Sondergaard dropped out of her role prior to principal photography commenced on the first installment. Edward Dein suggested that at Chaney Jr.'s request, the scripts incorporated lines for an audible inner "stream of consciousness" voiceovers that the audience would hear. Director Reginald LeBorg insisted that it was Pivar was just as much as a reason as Chaney for these additions.

== Film ==
Film	U.S. release date	Director	Screenwriter(s)	Story by	Producer(s)
Calling Dr. Death: An Inner Sanctum Mystery	December 17, 1943	Reginald LeBorg	Edward Dein	Edward Dein	Ben Pivar
Weird Woman: An Inner Sanctum Mystery	March 1, 1944	Reginald LeBorg	Brenda Weisberg	W. Scott Darling	Ben Pivar and Oliver Drake
Dead Man's Eyes: An Inner Sanctum Mystery	November 10, 1944	Reginald LeBorg	Dwight V. Babcock	Dwight V. Babcock	Ben Pivar and Will Cowan
The Frozen Ghost: An Inner Sanctum Mystery	June 1, 1945	Harold Young	Bernard Schubert & Luci Ward	Harrison Carter & Henry Sucher	Will Cowan
Strange Confession: An Inner Sanctum Mystery	October 5, 1945	John Hoffman	M. Coates Webster	Jean Bart	Ben Pivar
Pillow of Death: An Inner Sanctum Mystery	December 14, 1945	Wallace Fox	Dwight V. Babcock	George Bricker	Ben Pivar

=== Calling Dr. Death (1943) ===
When Dr. Mark Steele finds himself unable to recollect the last several days of his life, he's further disturbed to learn that his wife Maria has been found brutally murdered. Because of their troubled marriage including the recent occurrences of her unfaithful actions, Dr. Steele begins to wonder whether he was involved with her death as the investigation continues. Disturbed by the situation and hoping to recover his repressed memories, he requests that his nurse Stella perform hypnosis to determine whether he is a scheming murderer.

=== Weird Woman (1944) ===
Professor Norman Reed returns home from his trip to the South Seas, with an exotic native woman named Paula. The newlywed couple who are excited to begin their lives together, are surprised to find the townspeople questioning their intentions, as a series of strange occurrences inexplicably begin to happen including the murder of one of Reed's colleagues. Though she was raised by a superstitious tribe who believed she was a supernatural being, the Professor is determined to solve the mystery and prove his wife's innocence; to the town, to his wife, and to himself.

=== Dead Man's Eyes (1944) ===
A talented painter named David "Dave" Stuart is blinded, when one of his models named Tanya becomes jealous of his relationship with his fiancé Heather and secretly replaces his eyewash with acid. While coping with his new way of life following the incident, the father of his fiancé named the Dr. Stanley Hayden offers to be the donor for a cornea transplant once he should pass away. Following his mysterious and premature death however, its determined that Dr. Hayden died of unnatural causes and Dave finds himself the primary suspect. Separated from the love of his life, who now questions his character, Tanya offers to care for David as he adapts to his new way of life. As the investigation begins, Stuart inherits the corneas as a result of Dr. Hayden's will. Though the initial surgery seems to fail at helping the artist regain his sight, Dave works tirelessly to try and find the true culprit to prove his own innocence, all while the true murderer may be following his every move.

=== The Frozen Ghost (1945) ===
Alex Gregor is a successful illusionist known professionally as "Gregor the Great". One night during his stage show with his fiancé and assistant Maura Daniels, a drunken audience member begins to critique his routine. As Alex becomes angry and places the man into a trance through hypnotism, the man suddenly and inexplicably dies. Though the medical examination determines that it was caused by a heart attack, Alex is overcome with guilt and retires from his stage show believing that the incident was his fault. After his manager George Keene arranges a new job for him, working as a lecturer at Madame Valerie Monet's wax museum, Alex is overwhelmed by the female attention he has acquired from Monet, her niece Nina, and his fiancé who strives to convince him of his innocence. Following an angry confrontation with Monet however, all individuals involved are surprised by her disappearance. As he finds himself the primary suspect in accusations of murder, Alex works tirelessly with Maura determined more than ever to prove his innocence in both situations.

=== Strange Confession (1945) ===
When a scientist named Jeff Carter is pushed to complete his work on a vaccine to fight influenza, he finds himself at odds with his boss who is a pharmaceutical tycoon named Roger Graham. Believing that Graham only wants the riches and notoriety, Carter refuses to release the vaccine until more testing has been completed. Requesting more time, Jeff travels to South America for continued testing. Seeing an opportunity, Roger romantically pursues Jeff's wife Mary, and makes an executive business decision by prematurely releasing the vaccine. Returning from his trip, Jeff learns the ill-fated news about his wife, and learns that his son has died as a result of administration of the vaccine. Filled with rage, Jeff resolves to exact vengeance by any means necessary. Following the completion of his plans, Jeff approaches a renowned lawyer to confess his actions, where it is questioned whether a murder has occurred or a series of different events instead.

=== Pillow of Death (1945) ===
Wayne Fletcher, a successful attorney engages in an affair with his secretary Donna Kincaid, while the pair plan to be married once he divorces his wife. Unfortunately, his wife is found dead by suffocation however, and Wayne finds himself the primary suspect of the murder. As he seeks to prove his innocence, a questionable medium claims that she has contacted the spirit of his wife and supports the case that he is guilty. When a series of deaths in the same manner begin to occur one by one, Wayne works tirelessly to prove his own innocence. He is disturbed in the process however, when he begins to have visions of his dead wife, and begins to question his own sanity.

== Main cast and characters ==
With the exception of the final film Pillow of Death, the continuing thread throughout each film was an introductory scene with a floating head within a crystal ball portrayed by David Hoffman. It led with a warning the audience that even the most innocent man could be a potential murderer.

Character	Film					
Character	Calling Dr. Death	Weird Woman	Dead Man's Eyes	The Frozen Ghost	Strange Confession	Pillow of Death
Dr. Mark Steele	Lon Chaney, Jr.					
Maria Steele	Ramsay Ames					
Stella Madden	Patricia Morison					
Robert Duval	David Bruce					
Insp. Gregg	J. Carrol Naish					
Prof. Norman Reed		Lon Chaney, Jr.				
Paula Clayton Reed		Anne Gwynne				
Ilona Carr		Evelyn Ankers				
Prof. Millard Sawtelle		Ralph Morgan				
Margret Mercer		Lois Collier				
Evelyn Sawtelle		Elizabeth Russell				
David Jennings		Phil Brown				
David "Dave" Stuart			Lon Chaney, Jr.			
Heather "Brat" Hayden			Jean Parker			
Tanya Czoraki			Acquanetta			
Dr. Sam Welles			Jonathan Hale			
Dr. Stanley "Dad" Hayden			Edward Fielding			
Dr. Alan Bittaker			Paul Kelly			
Cpt. Det. Drury			Thomas Gomez			
Alex Gregor Gregor the Great				Lon Chaney, Jr.		
Maura Daniel				Evelyn Ankers		
Nina Coudreau				Elena Verdugo		
George Keene				Milburn Stone		
Valerie Monet				Tala Birell		
Dr. Rudi Poldan				Martin Kosleck		
Insp. Brant				Douglass Dumbrille		
the Skeptic				Arthur Hohl		
Jeff Carter					Lon Chaney, Jr.	
Mary Carter					Brenda Joyce	
Dave Curtis					Lloyd Bridges	
Roger Graham					J. Carrol Naish	
Atty. Wayne Fletcher						Lon Chaney, Jr.
Donna Kincaid						Brenda Joyce
Vivian Fletcher						Victoria Horne
Amelia Kincaid						Rosalind Ivan
Belle Kincaid						Clara Blandick
Samuel "Sam" Kincaid						George Cleveland
Cpt. "Cap'n" McCracken						Wilton Graff
Det. Harry						Harry Strang
Julian Julian						J. Edward Bromberg

== Additional crew and production details ==
Film	Crew/Detail						
Film	Composer(s)	Cinematographer	Editor	Production companies	Distributing company	Running time	Ref.
Calling Dr. Death	Paul Sawtell	Virgil Miller	Norman A. Cerf	Universal Pictures Corporation	Universal Pictures Corporation	1 hr 3 mins	
Weird Woman: An Inner Sanctum Mystery	Milton Carruth	Virgil Miller	Norman A. Cerf	Universal Pictures	Universal Pictures	1 hr 3 mins	
Dead Man's Eyes: An Inner Sanctum Mystery	Milton Carruth	Paul Ivano	Norman A. Cerf	Universal Pictures	Universal Pictures	1 hr 4 mins	
The Frozen Ghost: An Inner Sanctum Mystery	Richard Hageman, William Lava, Hans J. Salter, Paul Sawtell, and Frank Skinner	Paul Ivano	Fred R. Feitshans Jr.	Universal Pictures	Universal Pictures	1 hr 1 min	
Strange Confession: An Inner Sanctum Mystery	Frank Skinner	Maury Gertsman	Russell F. Schoengarth	Universal Pictures Corporation	Universal Pictures Corporation	1 hr 2 mins	
Pillow of Death: An Inner Sanctum Mystery	Frank Skinner	Jerome Ash	Edward Curtiss	Universal Pictures	Universal Pictures	1 hr 6 mins	

== Reception ==
In their book Universal Horrors (2007), authors Tom Weaver, Michael Brunas and John Brunas as "half-dozen feeble melodramas" that has little to recommend beyond camp value. The described their overall reception to film buffs and historians as missed opportunities, comparing them unfavorably to set by Columbia's Whistler films. Ken Hanke in his book A Critical Guide to Horror Film Series (1991) said except for Weird Woman, the series was not overtly horror film oriented. Hanke found the series the films as having "delusions of intellectualism". He summarized that the films are neither as strong as Universal's horror output of the 1930s but not as uninteresting as detractors often insist.

Kim Newman reviewed the series in Sight & Sound in 2021, describing it as "straddling whodunnit and horror" and that "the films vary in quality but mostly deliver as strange entertainment."

=== Critical modern analyses ===
Film	Rotten Tomatoes
Calling Dr. Death	(1 review)
Weird Woman	(1 review)
Dead Man's Eyes	
The Frozen Ghost	(2 reviews)
Strange Confession: The Missing Head	
Pillow of Death	

== Sources ==
- Hanke, Ken (1991). A Critical Guide to Horror Film Series. Garland Publishing. ISBN 1138965421.
- Lyons, Arthur (2000). Death on the Cheap : The Lost B Movies of Film Noir. Da Capo Press. ISBN 0306809966.
- Newman, Kim (March 2021). "Inner Sanctum Mysteries". Sight & Sound. Vol. 31, no. 2. p. 86.
- Weaver, Tom; Brunas, Michael; Brunas, John (2007) [1990]. Universal Horrors (2 ed.). McFarland & Company. ISBN 978-0-7864-2974-5.
