= Lon Chaney Jr. =

American actor (1906–1973)

- Chaney Jr. in 1964
- Born: Creighton Tull Chaney; February 10, 1906; Oklahoma City, Oklahoma Territory, U.S.
- Died: July 12, 1973 (aged 67); San Clemente, California, U.S.
- Occupation: Actor
- Years active: 1931–1971
- Spouses: Dorothy Hinckley (m. 1928; div. 1936) Patsy Beck (m. 1937)
- Children: 2
- Father: Lon Chaney
- Website: lonchaney.com/lon-chaney-jr/

Creighton Tull Chaney (February 10, 1906 – July 12, 1973), known by his stage name Lon Chaney Jr., was an American actor known for playing Larry Talbot in the film The Wolf Man (1941) and its various crossovers, Count Alucard (Dracula spelled backward) in Son of Dracula, Frankenstein's monster in The Ghost of Frankenstein (1942), the Mummy in three pictures, and various other roles in many Universal horror films, including six films in their 1940s Inner Sanctum series, making him a horror icon. He also portrayed Lennie Small in Of Mice and Men (1939) and played supporting parts in dozens of mainstream movies, including High Noon (1952), The Defiant Ones (1958), and numerous Westerns, musicals, comedies and dramas.

Originally referred to in films as Creighton Chaney, he was later credited as "Lon Chaney, Jr." in 1935. After Man Made Monster (1941), beginning as early as The Wolf Man later that same year, the studio insisted that he would almost always be billed under the name of his more famous father, the deceased cinema giant Lon Chaney. Chaney had English, French, and Irish ancestry. His career in movies and television spanned four decades, from 1931 to 1971.

== Early life ==
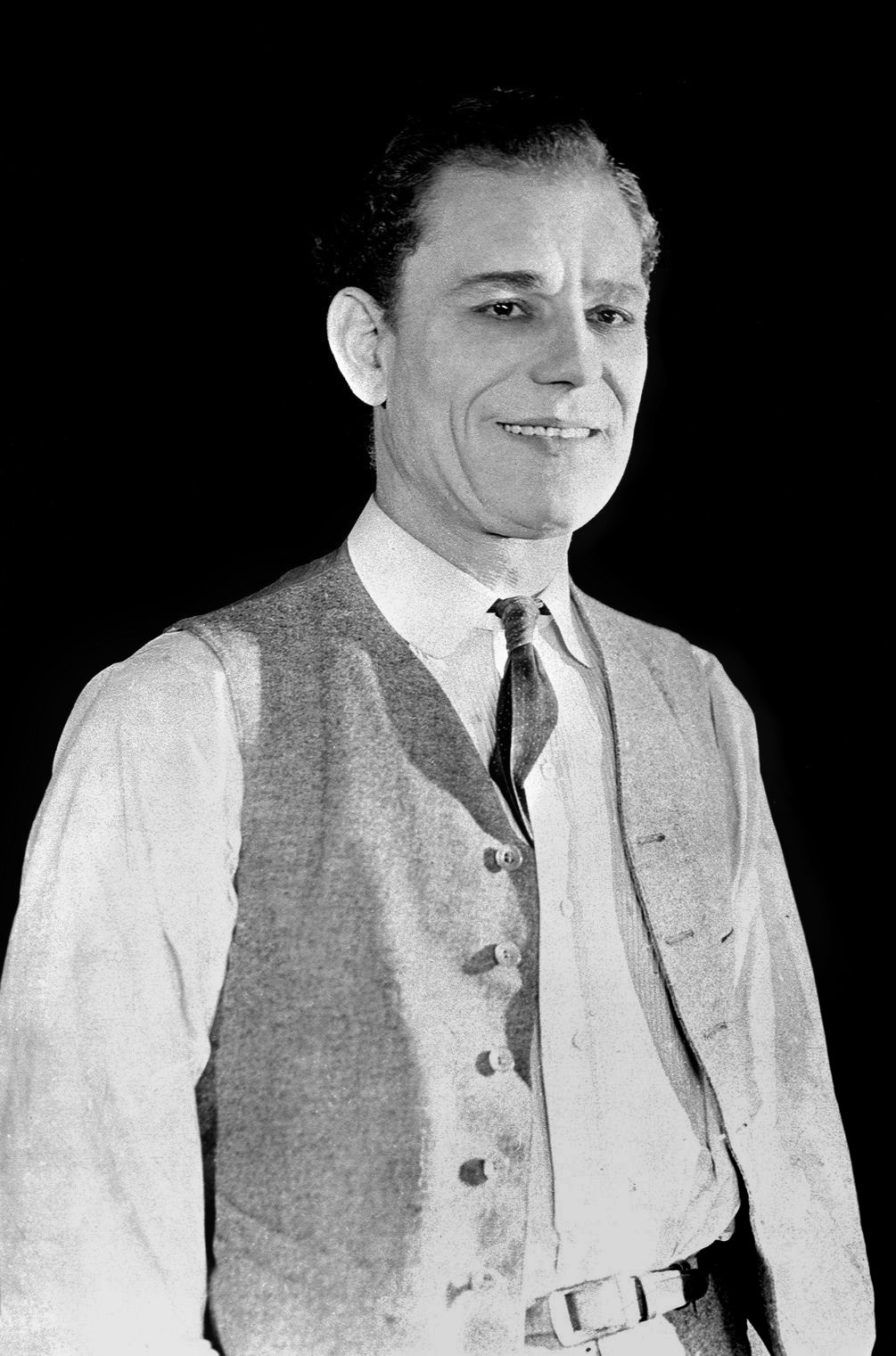
Lon Chaney, Creighton's father

Creighton Tull Chaney was born on February 10, 1906, in Oklahoma City, the son of then-stage performer Lon Chaney and Frances Cleveland Creighton, a singing stage performer who traveled in road shows across the country with Chaney. In a 1965 interview, Chaney Jr. claimed that he was a stillborn baby. "I was all black and not breathing when I was born," he shared. "My father ran out of the house with me and broke a hole in the ice in a nearby lake, and dunked me in time after time until he revived me". His parents' troubled marriage ended in divorce in 1913 following his mother's scandalous public suicide attempt in Los Angeles. Many articles and biographies over the years report that Creighton was led to believe his mother had died while he was a boy, and he only learned that she was still alive after his father's death. Creighton always maintained he had a tough childhood.

Young Creighton lived in various homes and boarding schools until 1916, when his father (now employed in the film industry) married Hazel Hastings and could provide a stable home.

From an early age, he worked hard to avoid his famous father's shadow. In young adulthood, his father discouraged him from show business, and he attended business college and became successful in a Los Angeles appliance corporation. Creighton, who had begun working for a plumbing company, married Dorothy Hinckley, the daughter of his employer Ralph Hinckley. They had two sons: Lon Ralph Chaney and Ronald Creighton Chaney.

Creighton's father was diagnosed with throat cancer and died on August 26, 1930, at the age of 47.

== Career ==
=== As Creighton Chaney ===
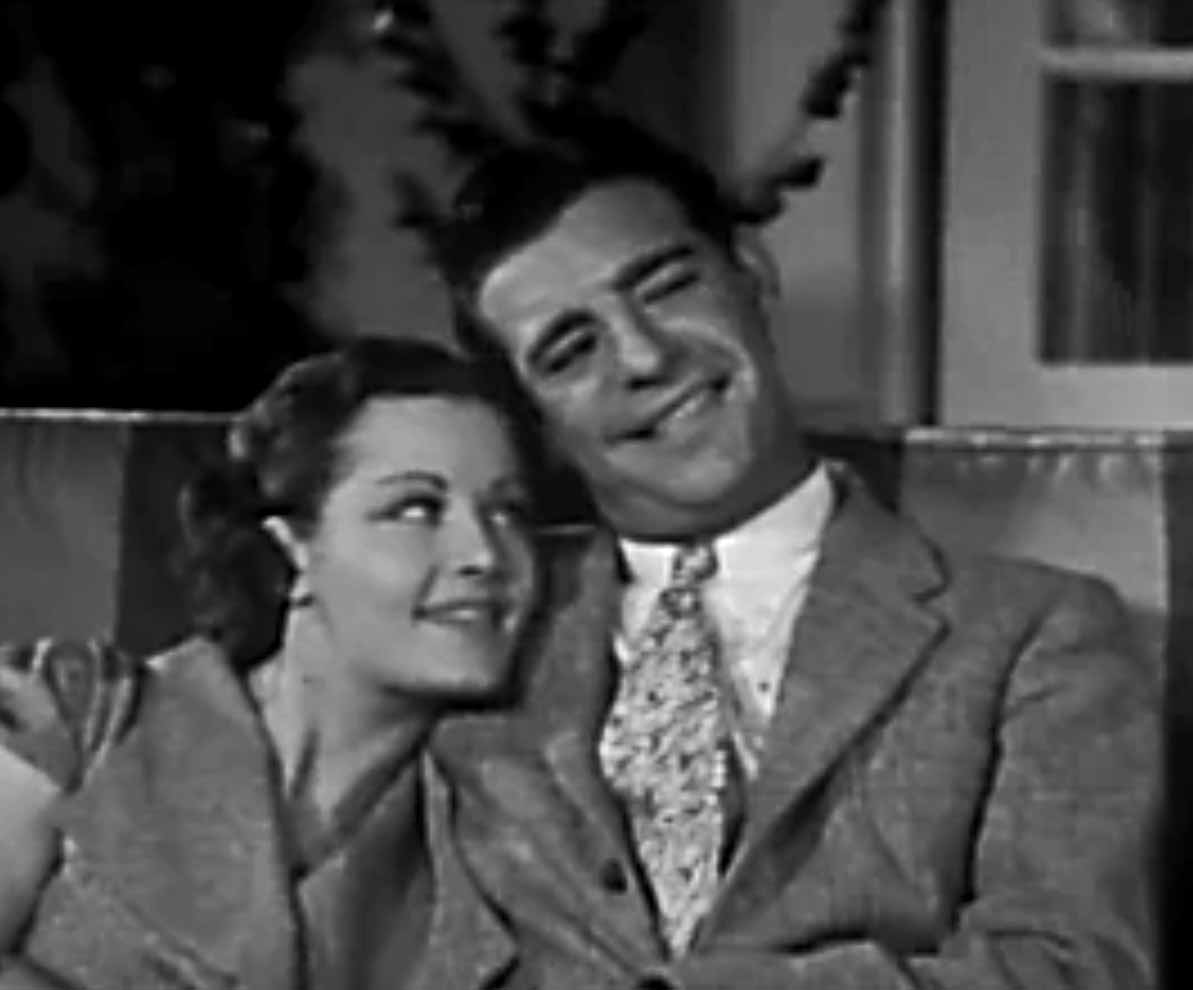
Gigi Parrish and Chaney in Girl o' My Dreams (1934)

It was only after his father's death that Chaney began to act in films, billed under his own name. He began with an uncredited bit part in the serial The Galloping Ghost (1931) and signed a contract with RKO where he was given small roles in a number of films, including Girl Crazy (1932), Bird of Paradise (1932), and The Most Dangerous Game (1932) (from which Chaney's few scenes were edited out before the film was released).

RKO gave him the starring role in a serial, The Last Frontier (1932). He got bigger film roles in Lucky Devils (1933), Son of the Border (1933), Scarlet River (1933), and The Life of Vergie Winters (1934). Over at Mascot Pictures he supported John Wayne in a serial, The Three Musketeers (1933), which was later re-edited into a film entitled Desert Command (1946).

"I did every possible bit in pictures" said Chaney later. "Had to do stuntwork to live. I bulldogged steers, fell off and got knocked off cliffs, rode horses off precipices into rivers, drove prairie schooners up and down hills."

He had the lead in the independent film Sixteen Fathoms Deep (1934), and a memorable part in which his character sings in Girl o' My Dreams (1934) at Monogram. The last film he made as Creighton Chaney was The Marriage Bargain (1935) for Screencraft Productions. After this point he was billed as Lon Chaney, Jr. until 1942, when he was usually billed, at the insistence of Universal Studios, with his iconic father's name, although the "Jr." was usually added by others to distinguish the two.

=== As Lon Chaney Jr. ===
He had the lead in A Scream in the Night (1934) made for Commodore Pictures, a crime thriller. He played small roles at Paramount: Hold 'Em Yale (1935), Accent on Youth (1935) and Rose Bowl (1936). A small outfit, Ray Kirkwood Productions, gave him a lead, The Shadow of Silk Lennox (1935).

At Republic, he featured alongside Gene Autry in The Singing Cowboy (1936) and The Old Corral (1937). He was a henchman in a serial for Republic, Undersea Kingdom (1936). Universal got him to play a henchman in their serial, Ace Drummond (1937), and he was uncredited in Columbia's Killer at Large (1936). He lent his name to a café which was embroiled in a liquor scandal.

Chaney Jr. was the main villain in Cheyenne Rides Again (1937) and also played a villainous part in a serial, Secret Agent X-9 (1937).

=== 20th Century Fox ===
Chaney Jr. signed a contract at 20th Century Fox and appeared in Love Is News (1937) with Tyrone Power, Midnight Taxi (1937) with Brian Donlevy, That I May Live (1937), This Is My Affair (1937) with Robert Taylor and Barbara Stanwyck, Angel's Holiday (1937), Born Reckless (1937) with Brian Donlevy, Wild and Woolly (1937) with Walter Brennan, The Lady Escapes (1937) with Gloria Stuart, Thin Ice (1937) with Tyrone Power, One Mile from Heaven (1937) with Claire Trevor, Charlie Chan on Broadway (1938), Life Begins in College (1937) with the Ritz Brothers, Wife, Doctor and Nurse (1937) with Loretta Young, Second Honeymoon (1937) with Tyrone Power and Loretta Young, Checkers (1937), Love and Hisses (1938) with Walter Winchell, City Girl (1938), Happy Landing (1938) with Ethel Merman, Sally, Irene and Mary (1938) with Fred Allen and Jimmy Durante, Mr. Moto's Gamble (1938) with Peter Lorre, Walking Down Broadway (1938) with Claire Trevor, Alexander's Ragtime Band (1938) with Tyrone Power, Josette (1938) with Don Ameche and Robert Young, Speed to Burn (1938) with Lynn Bari, Passport Husband (1938), Straight, Place and Show (1938) with the Ritz Brothers, John Ford's Submarine Patrol (1938) with Nancy Kelly, and Road Demon (1939). He was almost killed by a train while filming a bank robbery scene in Jesse James (1939). Jesse James also coincidentally featured Henry Hull, the star of Werewolf of London (1935), in a supporting role.

Chaney Jr. later made Charlie Chan in City in Darkness (1939) with Lynn Bari and Frontier Marshal (1939) with Randolph Scott and Nancy Kelly.

=== Of Mice and Men (1939) ===
Chaney Jr's only stage appearance had been as Lennie Small in a production of Of Mice and Men with Wallace Ford. He was cast in that role in the 1939 film adaptation, which was produced by Hal Roach Studios. The film was Chaney Jr's first major role in a film and was a critical success for him. Chaney had a screen test for the role of Quasimodo for the remake of The Hunchback of Notre Dame (1939), a role which his father played back in 1923, but the role went to Charles Laughton.

=== One Million B.C. ===
Hal Roach used him in his third-billed character role in One Million B.C. (1940) as Victor Mature's caveman father, after which Chaney began to be viewed as a character actor in the mold of his father. He had in fact designed a swarthy, ape-like Neanderthal make-up on himself for the film, but production decisions and union rules prevented his following through on emulating his father in that fashion. Cecil B. DeMille used him in a supporting role in North West Mounted Police (1940) and MGM used him in Billy the Kid (1941) with Robert Taylor as Billy and Brian Donlevy as Pat Garrett. That studio considered putting Chaney Jr in a remake of his father's hit He Who Gets Slapped but decided not to make it.

=== Universal Pictures ===
Universal Pictures offered Chaney Jr the lead in Man-Made Monster (1941), a science-fiction horror thriller originally written with Boris Karloff in mind. Chaney's first horror film, it was successful enough for them to offer him a long-term contract.

Universal kept him in supporting roles for a while: a comedy Too Many Blondes (1941), a musical San Antonio Rose (1941) with Shemp Howard, a serial Riders of Death Valley (1941) featuring Noah Beery Jr., the Western Badlands of Dakota (1941) and the "Northern" North to the Klondike (1942) with Broderick Crawford.

=== Horror film star: The Wolf Man, The Mummy, Inner Sanctum ===
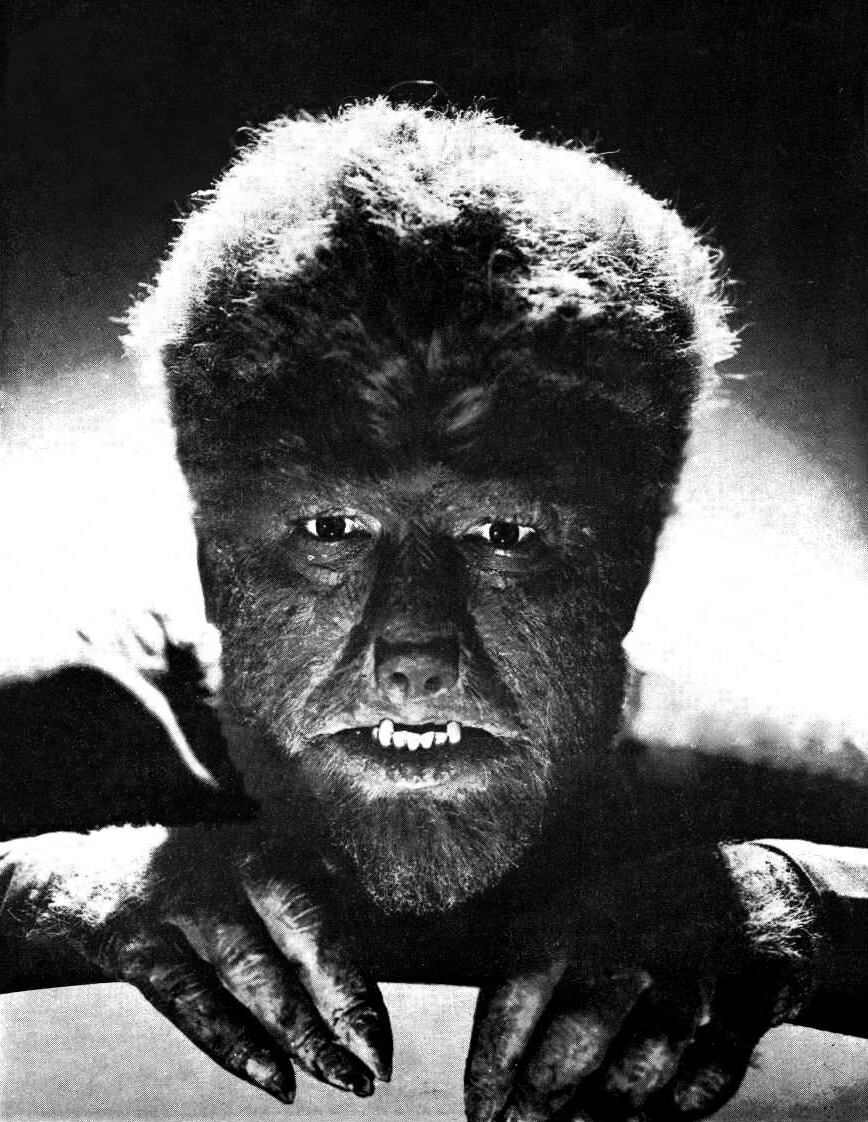
Chaney Jr. as The Wolf Man (1941)

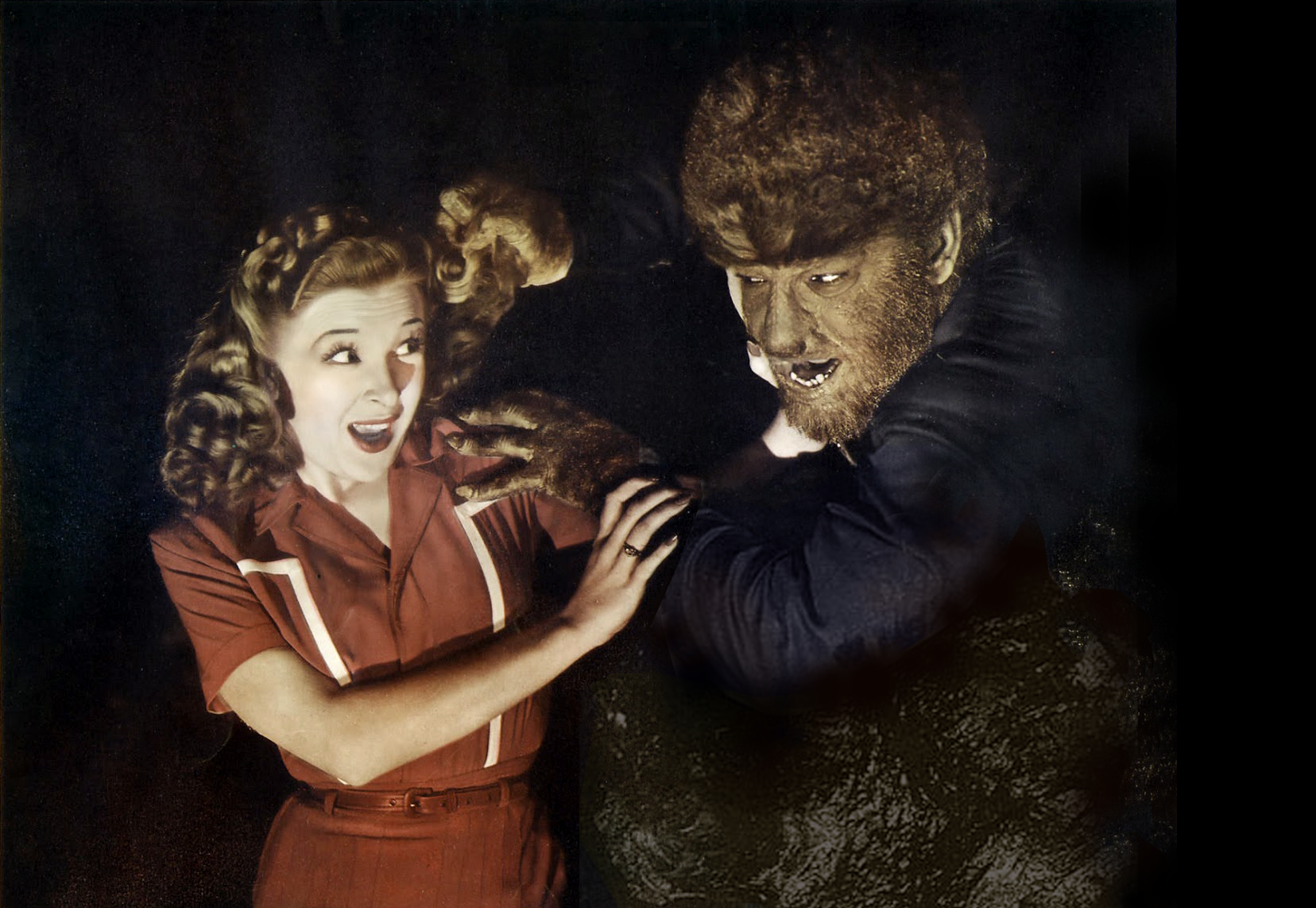
Evelyn Ankers in The Wolf Man

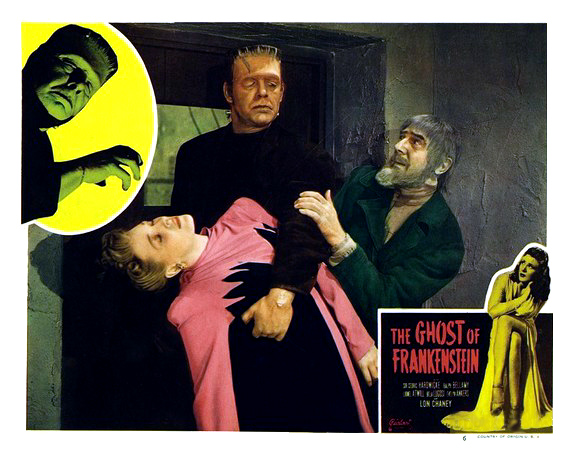
Chaney Jr., Evelyn Ankers and Bela Lugosi in The Ghost of Frankenstein (1942)

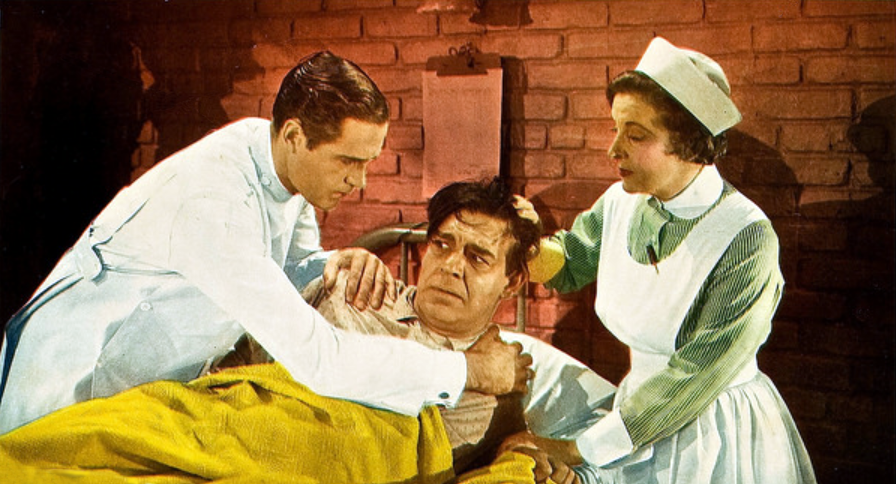
Patric Knowles, Chaney Jr. and Doris Lloyd in Frankenstein Meets the Wolf Man (1943)

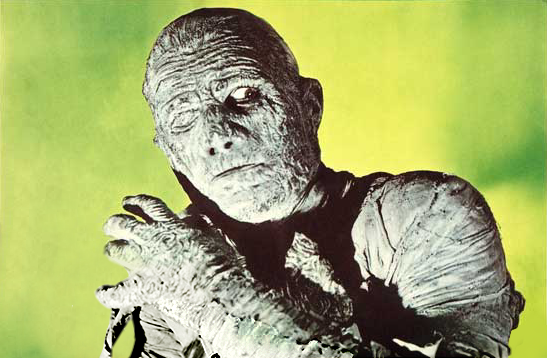
Chaney Jr. as the Mummy in The Mummy's Ghost (1944)

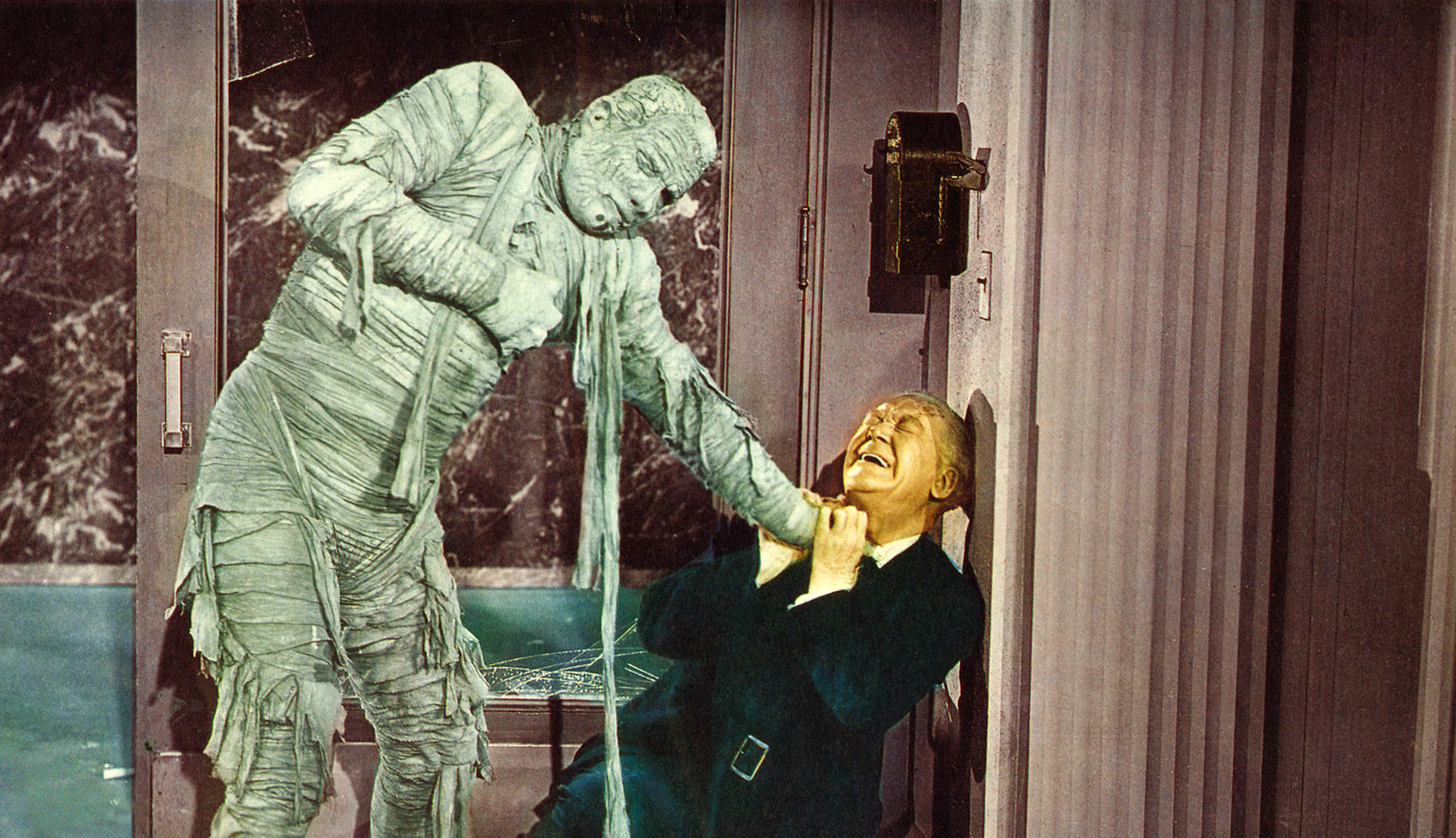
Chaney Jr. as the Mummy in The Mummy's Ghost (1944)

Chaney Jr. was then given the title role in The Wolf Man (1941) for Universal, a role which, much like Karloff's Frankenstein monster, would largely typecast Chaney as a horror film actor for the rest of his life. Universal dropped the "Jr." and billed him as "Lon Chaney" going forward within that studio, apparently to foster confusion with his father among audiences.

Chaney Jr. was now an official horror star, and Universal gave him the role of Frankenstein's monster in The Ghost of Frankenstein (1942), the first B-movie of the series, when Boris Karloff decided not to play the part again; Bela Lugosi returned in his role as Ygor and the leading lady was Evelyn Ankers. He was in a crime film, Eyes of the Underworld (1942), and the wartime shorts Keeping Fit (1942) and What We Are Fighting For (1943).

Chaney Jr. played Kharis the Mummy in The Mummy's Tomb (1942), another hit. He was in a Western Frontier Badmen (1943), then reprised his role as the Wolf Man in Frankenstein Meets the Wolf Man (1943) with Bela Lugosi as Frankenstein's monster. The film was originally filmed with the Monster being blind and speaking in Lugosi's distinctive "Ygor" voice, but the studio cut out all references to either so that audiences were left wondering why the Monster staggered around with his arms extended in front of him, not to mention why he had lost the ability to speak since Ghost of Frankenstein, grievously damaging Lugosi's reputation.

Chaney Jr. was given the role of Dracula in Son of Dracula (1943); the film was actually about Dracula himself, who had no son in the film. This made him the only actor to portray all four of Universal's major horror characters: the Wolf Man, Frankenstein's monster, the Mummy, and Count Dracula.

After a cameo in Crazy House (1943) he was given the lead in Calling Dr. Death (1943), based on the Inner Sanctum mysteries. It kicked off another series starring Chaney, the next of which was Weird Woman (1944).

He made a second mummy movie, The Mummy's Ghost (1944), and had a supporting part in Cobra Woman (1944), starring Maria Montez, and Ghost Catchers (1944), with the comedy team Olsen and Johnson.

Dead Man's Eyes (1944) was the third Inner Sanctum, after which he was back as the Wolf Man in House of Frankenstein (1944). The Mummy's Curse (1944) was Chaney's third and final appearance as Kharis.

He played an antagonist in the Abbott and Costello comedy Here Come the Co-Eds (1945), then made more Inner Sanctums: The Frozen Ghost (1945) with Evelyn Ankers and Strange Confession (1945) with Brenda Joyce. He returned as the Wolf Man in House of Dracula (1945), one of the last of the Universal horror cycle. Pillow of Death (1945) was the last Inner Sanctum. The Daltons Ride Again (1945) was a Western featuring Noah Beery Jr. in a supporting role.

=== Leaving Universal ===
Despite being typecast as the Wolf Man, the 6-foot 2-inch, 220-pound actor managed to carve out a secondary niche as a supporting actor and villain.

He was in a Bob Hope comedy, My Favorite Brunette (1947), supported Randolph Scott in Albuquerque (1948) and had a supporting role in The Counterfeiters (1948); he played a villain in 16 Fathoms Deep (1948) for Monogram Pictures, a remake of his 1934 film.

He reprised his Wolf Man role to great effect in Abbott and Costello Meet Frankenstein (1948) but it did not cause a notable boost to his career. In April 1948 Chaney was hospitalized after taking an overdose of sleeping pills. He recovered and played Harry Brock in a Los Angeles theater production of Born Yesterday in 1949.

Chaney kept busy in support roles: Captain China (1950), Once a Thief (1950), Inside Straight (1951), Bride of the Gorilla (1951), Only the Valiant (1951), Behave Yourself! (1951), Flame of Araby (1952), The Bushwackers (1952), Thief of Damascus (1952), Battles of Chief Pontiac (1952) (in the title role), High Noon (1952), Springfield Rifle (1952), The Black Castle (1952) (a return to horror), Raiders of the Seven Seas (1953), A Lion Is in the Streets (1953) with James Cagney, The Boy from Oklahoma (1954), Casanova's Big Night (1954), Passion (1954), The Black Pirates (1954), Jivaro (1955), Big House, U.S.A. (1955), I Died a Thousand Times (1955), The Indian Fighter (1955), and The Black Sleep (1956)

He had a leading role in Indestructible Man (1956) then was back to supporting parts: Manfish (1956); a Martin and Lewis comedy, Pardners (1956); Daniel Boone, Trail Blazer (1957); The Cyclops (1957) and The Alligator People (1959).

Chaney established himself as a favorite of producer Stanley Kramer; in addition to playing a key supporting role in High Noon (1952) (starring Gary Cooper), he also appeared in Not as a Stranger (1955)—a hospital melodrama featuring Robert Mitchum and Frank Sinatra—and The Defiant Ones (1958, starring Tony Curtis and Sidney Poitier). Kramer told the press at the time that whenever a script came in with a role too difficult for most actors in Hollywood, he called Chaney.

He became quite popular with baby boomers after Universal released its back catalog of horror films to television in 1957 (Shock Theater) and Famous Monsters of Filmland magazine regularly focused on his films.

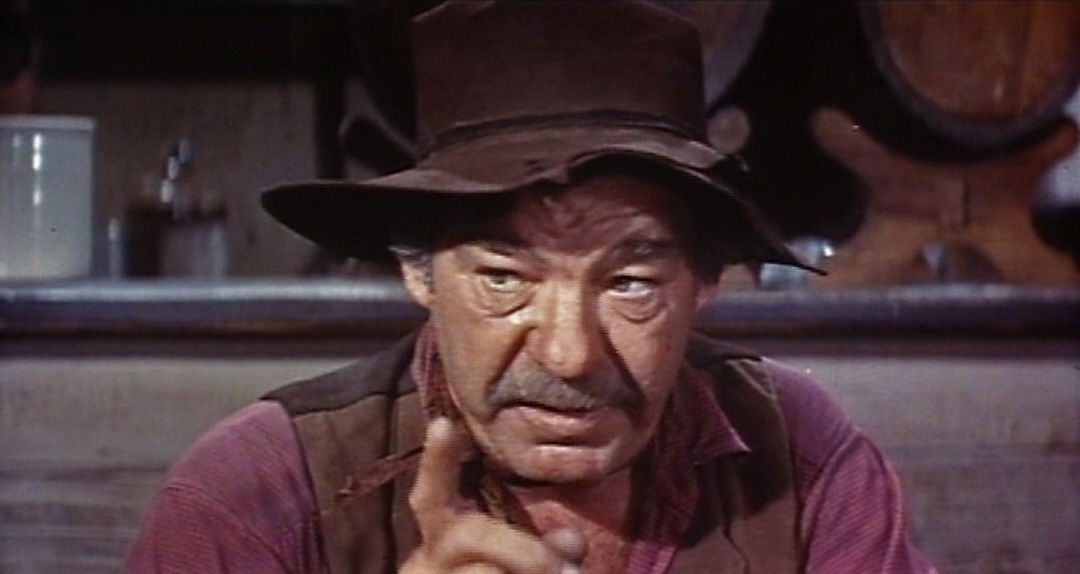
Chaney Jr. in Money, Women and Guns (1958)

In 1957, Chaney went to Ontario, Canada, to costar in the first ever American-Canadian television production, as Chingachgook in Hawkeye and the Last of the Mohicans, suggested by James Fenimore Cooper's stories. The series ended after 39 episodes. Universal released their film biography of his father, Man of a Thousand Faces (1957), featuring a semi-fictionalized version of Creighton's life story from his birth up until his father's death. Roger Smith was cast as Creighton as a young adult.

He appeared in an episode of the western series Tombstone Territory titled "The Black Marshal from Deadwood" (1958), and appeared in numerous western series such as Rawhide. He also hosted the 13-episode television anthology series 13 Demon Street in 1959, which was created by Curt Siodmak.

=== 1960s ===
In the 1960s, Chaney specialized in horror films, such as House of Terror (1960), The Devil's Messenger (1961) and The Haunted Palace (1963), replacing Boris Karloff in the last of those for Roger Corman. In January 1962, Chaney appeared in Season 4 episode titled "The Tarnished Badge" of the television show Lawman. Chaney plays Jess Bridges a US Marshal gone bad. His Deputy was at one time Dan Troop (John Russell). Bridges redeems himself at the episode's end by saving Deputy Johnny McKay

He was in a Western, Law of the Lawless (1963) with Dale Robertson, Face of the Screaming Werewolf (1964), Witchcraft (1964), and Stage to Thunder Rock (1964).

He starred in Jack Hill's Spider Baby, which was made in 1964 but not released until 1968 and would not attain notoriety until after Chaney's death. Then it was back to Westerns – Young Fury (1965), Black Spurs (1965), Town Tamer (1965), Apache Uprising (1965), Johnny Reno (1966), Welcome to Hard Times (1967) and Buckskin (1968). There was also horror, such as Dr. Terror's Gallery of Horrors (1967) and Hillbillys in a Haunted House (1967).

His bread-and-butter work during this decade was television – where he made guest appearances on everything from Wagon Train to The Monkees – and in a string of supporting roles in low-budget Westerns produced by A. C. Lyles for Paramount. In 1962, Chaney gained a chance to briefly play Quasimodo in a simulacrum of his father's make-up, as well as return to his roles of the Mummy and the Wolf Man on the television series Route 66 with friends Boris Karloff and Peter Lorre (Karloff wore a quickie version of the Frankenstein monster make-up toward the end of the episode).

=== Final films ===
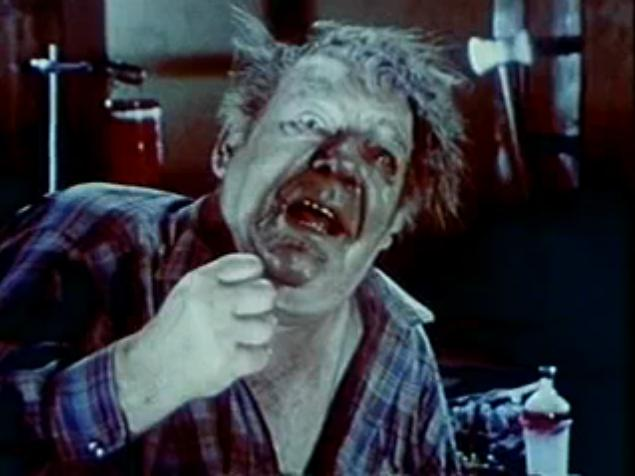
Chaney Jr. in Dracula vs. Frankenstein (1971)

In later years, he suffered from throat cancer and chronic heart disease among other ailments after decades of heavy drinking and smoking. In his final horror film, Dracula vs. Frankenstein, directed by Al Adamson, he played Groton, Dr. Frankenstein's mute henchman. He filmed his part in the spring of 1969, and shortly thereafter performed his final film role, also for Adamson, in The Female Bunch. Both films were released in 1971. Though filmed before The Female Bunch, Dracula vs. Frankenstein was released some weeks later. Chaney had lines in The Female Bunch but his hoarse, raspy voice was virtually unrecognizable. Due to illness he retired from acting to concentrate on a book about the Chaney family legacy, A Century of Chaneys, which remains to date unpublished in any form. As of 2008, his grandson, Ron Chaney Jr., was working on completing this project.

== Personal life ==
Chaney was married twice. He had two sons by his first wife, Dorothy, Lon Ralph Chaney aka Lon Chaney the Third (July 3, 1928 – May 5, 1992) and Ronald Creighton Chaney (March 18, 1930 – December 15, 1987). (Ron Chaney later fathered a son himself named Ron Chaney Jr.). Dorothy divorced Lon in 1936 for drinking too much and being "sullen". He married Patsy Beck in 1937.

Chaney was well liked by some co-workers – "sweet" is the adjective that most commonly emerges from those who acted with, and liked him – yet he was capable of intense dislikes. For instance, he and frequent co-star Evelyn Ankers did not get along at all. He was also known to befriend younger actors and stand up for older ones who he felt were belittled by the studios. One example was William Farnum, a major silent star who played a small role in The Mummy's Curse. According to co-star Peter Coe, Chaney demanded that Farnum be given his own chair on the set and be treated with respect, or else he would walk off the picture.

Chaney had run-ins with actor Frank Reicher (whom he nearly strangled on camera in The Mummy's Ghost) and director Robert Siodmak (over whose head Chaney broke a vase). Actor Robert Stack claimed in his 1980 autobiography that Chaney and drinking buddy Broderick Crawford were known as "the monsters" around the Universal Pictures lot because of their drunken behavior that frequently resulted in bloodshed.

=== Honors ===
In 1999, a Golden Palm Star on the Palm Springs, California, Walk of Stars was dedicated to him.

== Death ==
Chaney suffered from a series of illnesses in the year prior to his death. In April 1973, he was released from the hospital after undergoing surgery for cataracts and treatment for beriberi. He also suffered from liver problems and gout. Chaney died on July 12, 1973, in San Clemente, California, at the age of 67. His cause of death was not immediately released to the public. Chaney's death certificate listed his cause of death as cardiac failure due to arteriosclerotic heart disease and cardiomyopathy. He donated his body to science (his badly deteriorated liver and lungs were kept for years as specimens in a college medical center) and he was dissected after his death by medical students. Hence no grave exists.

He was honored by appearing as the Wolf Man on one of a 1997 series of United States postage stamps depicting movie monsters (his father appeared as the Phantom of the Opera, while Bela Lugosi appeared as Dracula, and Boris Karloff had two stamps as Frankenstein's monster and the original Mummy). His grandson Ron Chaney Jr. has appeared frequently as a guest at horror movie conventions.

== Filmography ==
This is a list of known Lon Chaney Jr. theatrical films. Television appearances are listed separately.

Year	Film	Role	Director	Notes
1922	The Trap	The boy's hands	Robert Thornby	Only Chaney Jr.'s hands were shown in this silent film
1931	The Galloping Ghost	Henchman	Benjamin H. Kline	Uncredited (unverified); 12-chapter serial
1932	Girl Crazy	A chorus dancer	William A. Seiter	Wheeler and Woolsey comedy based on the Gershwin musical
1932	Bird of Paradise	Thornton	King Vidor	starring Dolores Del Rio
1932	The Most Dangerous Game	bit part, edited out later	King Vidor	starring Robert Armstrong and Fay Wray; Chaney's scene was edited out of the final print
1932	The Last Frontier	Tom Kirby, aka The Black Ghost	Thomas Storey	12-chapter serial; also released as a 70-minute feature version called The Black Ghost.
1933	Lucky Devils	Frankie Wilde	Ralph Ince	starring William Boyd
1933	Scarlet River	evil foreman Jeff Todd	Otto Brower	starring Tom Keene
1933	The Three Musketeers	Armand Corday [Chapters 1, 10 only]	Armand Schaefer, Colbert Clark	12-chapter serial starring John Wayne; later edited into a feature version Desert Command (1946)
1933	Son of the Border	Jack Breen	Lloyd Nosler	starring Tom Keene
1934	Sixteen Fathoms Deep	Joe Bethel, a fisherman	Armand Schaefer	
1934	The Life of Vergie Winters	Hugo McQueen	Alfred Santell	
1934	A Scream in the Night	Jack Wilson / Butch Curtain	Fred C. Newmeyer	Chaney played two different characters in this film; this film was filmed in 1934, but was not theatrically released until 1943
1934	Girl o' My Dreams	Track star Don Cooper	Ray McCarey	Based on a David Belasco play; Chaney sings a song
1935	Captain Hurricane	Dave	Charles Kerr	Uncredited
1935	The Marriage Bargain	Bob Gordon	Albert Ray	aka Woman of Destiny
1935	Hold 'Em Yale	Yale football player	Sidney Lanfield	Uncredited; starring Buster Crabbe, based on a story by Damon Runyon
1935	Accent on Youth	Chuck	Wesley Ruggles	starring Silvia Sydney
1935	The Shadow of Silk Lennox	"Silk" Lennox	Ray Kirkwood, Jack Nelson	later re-released as Case of the Crime Cartel
1936	The Singing Cowboy	Martin	Mack V. Wright	starring Gene Autry; Chaney changed his name to Lon Chaney Jr. with this film
1936	Undersea Kingdom	Henchman Hakur	Joseph Kane, Reeves Eason	12-chapter serial starring Ray Corrigan
1936	Ace Drummond	Henchman Ivan	Ford Beebe; Clifford Smith	13-chapter serial
1936	Killer at Large	Wax museum guard	David Selman	Uncredited; later released to TV as Killers on the Loose
1936	Rose Bowl	Sierra Football Player	Charles Barton	Uncredited; starring Buster Crabbe
1936	The Old Corral	Simms' partner, Garland	Joseph Kane	starring Gene Autry
1937	Cheyenne Rides Again	Girard	Robert F. Hill	starring Tom Tyler
1937	Love Is News	Newsman	Tay Garnett	Uncredited; starring Tyrone Power
1937	Midnight Taxi	Detective Erickson	Eugene Forde	starring Brian Donlevy
1937	Secret Agent X-9	Maroni	Clifford Smith	12-chapter serial based on the Alex Raymond comic strip
1937	That I May Live	Engineer	Allan Dwan	Uncredited
1937	This Is My Affair	Chaney's voice from offscreen	William A. Seiter	Uncredited; co-starring Barbara Stanwyck and John Carradine
1937	Angel's Holiday	Eddie	James Tinling	
1937	Slave Ship	Laborer killed at launching	Tay Garnett	Uncredited
1937	Born Reckless	Auto mechanic	Malcolm St. Clair	Uncredited; starring Brian Donlevy
1937	Wild and Woolly	Dutch	Alfred L. Werker	
1937	The Lady Escapes	Reporter (bit part)	Eugene Forde	Uncredited
1937	One Mile From Heaven	Policeman	Allan Dwan	Uncredited
1937	Thin Ice	News Reporter	Sidney Lanfield	Uncredited
1937	Wife, Doctor and Nurse	Scott, a chauffeur	Walter Lang	starring Loretta Young
1937	Charlie Chan on Broadway	Desk reporter	Eugene Forde	Uncredited; starring Warner Oland
1937	Life Begins in College	Gilks	William A. Seiter	Ritz Brothers comedy
1937	Second Honeymoon	Reporter	Walter Lang	Uncredited
1937	Checkers	Man at racetrack	H. Bruce Humberstone	Uncredited
1937	Love and Hisses	Attendant	Sidney Lanfield	Uncredited
1938	Alexander's Ragtime Band	Photographer	Sidney Lanfield	Uncredited; big-budget musical starring Tyrone Power
1938	City Girl	Gangster	Alfred L. Werker	Uncredited
1938	Happy Landing	Newspaper Reporter	Roy Del Ruth	Uncredited; musical starring Don Ameche
1938	Sally, Irene and Mary	Policeman	Edmund Goulding	Uncredited; co-starring Jimmy Durante
1938	Walking Down Broadway	Delivery Man	Norman Foster	Uncredited
1938	Mr. Moto's Gamble	Joey	James Tinling	starring Peter Lorre
1938	Alexander's Ragtime Band	Photographer on Stage	Henry King	Uncredited
1938	Josette	Boatman	Allan Dwan	starring Don Ameche and Robert Young
1938	Speed to Burn	Racetrack Tout	Otto Brower	
1938	Passport Husband	Bull	James Tinling	
1938	Straight, Place and Show	Martin, a chauffeur	David Butler	Uncredited; a Ritz Brothers comedy
1938	Submarine Patrol	Sailor	John Ford	Uncredited; co-starred John Carradine
1938	Road Demon	Bud Casey, a racketeer	Otto Brower	
1939	Jesse James	Jesse James' henchman	Henry King	co-starring Henry Fonda and John Carradine
1939	Union Pacific	Dollarhide, a train passenger	Cecil B. DeMille	big-budget western starring Barbara Stanwyck
1939	Frontier Marshal	Pringle	Allan Dwan	co-starring John Carradine
1939	Charlie Chan in City in Darkness	Pierre	Herbert I. Leeds	starring Sidney Toler
1939	Of Mice and Men	Lennie Small	Lewis Milestone	Based on the John Steinbeck novel; co-starring Burgess Meredith
1940	One Million B.C.	Akhoba, a cave man	Hal Roach Jr., D. W. Griffith	
1940	North West Mounted Police	Shorty	Cecil B. DeMille	starring Gary Cooper
1941	Man-Made Monster	Dan McCormick	George Waggner	co-starring Lionel Atwill; theatrically re-released in 1953 as The Atomic Monster
1941	Too Many Blondes	Marvin Gimble	Thornton Freeland	musical comedy starring Rudy Vallee
1941	Billy the Kid	"Spike" Hudson	David Miller	starring Robert Taylor
1941	San Antonio Rose	Jigsaw Kennedy	Charles Lamont	co-starring Shemp Howard
1941	Riders of Death Valley	Henchman Butch	Ray Taylor	15-chapter serial co-starring Glenn Strange and Buck Jones
1941	Badlands of Dakota	Jack McCall	Alfred E. Green	co-starring Broderick Crawford
1941	The Wolf Man	Lawrence Talbot, the Wolf Man	George Waggner	co-starring Bela Lugosi and Claude Rains
1942	North to the Klondike	Nate Carson	Erle C. Kenton	from a story by William Castle; co-starring Broderick Crawford
1942	The Ghost of Frankenstein	The Monster	Erle C. Kenton	co-starring Bela Lugosi and Lionel Atwill
1942	Overland Mail	Jim Lane	Ford Beebe, John Rawlins	15-chapter serial
1942	Eyes of the Underworld	Benny	Roy William Neill	re-released in 1951 as Criminals of the Underworld
1942	The Mummy's Tomb	Kharis, the Mummy	Harold Young	
1942	Keeping Fit	Chaney plays himself	Arthur Lubin	Universal short subject; co-starring Broderick Crawford
1943	Frankenstein Meets the Wolf Man	Lawrence Talbot	Roy William Neill	co-starring Bela Lugosi
1943	What We Are Fighting For?	Bill Wallace	Erle C. Kenton	Universal short subject
1943	Frontier Badmen	Chango	Ford Beebe	
1943	Crazy House	Chaney plays himself in a cameo	Edward F. Cline	Uncredited; an Olsen and Johnson comedy co-starring Basil Rathbone
1943	Son of Dracula	Count Alucard / Dracula	Robert Siodmak	
1943	Calling Dr. Death	Dr. Mark Steele	Reginald LeBorg	An Inner Sanctum mystery produced by Universal Pictures
1944	Weird Woman	Prof. Norman Reed	Reginald LeBorg	An Inner Sanctum mystery produced by Universal Pictures; based on the Fritz Leiber novel Conjure Wife
1944	Follow the Boys	Chaney plays himself in a cameo	A. Edward Sutherland	Uncredited
1944	Cobra Woman	Hava	Robert Siodmak	shot in Technicolor; co-starring Sabu
1944	Ghost Catchers	Chaney plays a bear	Edward F. Cline	Olsen and Johnson comedy
1944	The Mummy's Ghost	Kharis the Mummy	Reginald LeBorg	co-starring John Carradine
1944	Dead Man's Eyes	Dave Stuart	Reginald LeBorg	An Inner Sanctum mystery produced by Universal Pictures
1944	House of Frankenstein	Lawrence Talbot, the Wolf Man	Erle C. Kenton	co-starring John Carradine and Boris Karloff
1944	The Mummy's Curse	Kharis the Mummy	Leslie Goodwins	
1945	Here Come The Co-Eds	Johnson	Jean Yarbrough	starring Abbott and Costello
1945	The Frozen Ghost	Alex Gregor / Gregor the Great	Harold Young	An Inner Sanctum mystery produced by Universal Pictures
1945	Strange Confession	Jeff Carter	John Hoffman	An Inner Sanctum mystery produced by Universal Pictures
1945	The Daltons Ride Again	Grat Dalton	Ray Taylor	
1945	House of Dracula	Lawrence Talbot / The Wolf Man	Erle C. Kenton	
1945	Pillow of Death	Wayne Fletcher	Wallace Fox	An Inner Sanctum mystery produced by Universal Pictures
1947	Laguna U.S.A.	Chaney plays himself doing "Lennie"	Ralph Staub	10-minute Columbia short subject
1947	My Favorite Brunette	Willie	Elliott Nugent	co-starring Bob Hope and Peter Lorre
1948	Albuquerque	Steve Murkill	Ray Enright	starring Randolph Scott
1948	The Counterfeiters	Louie Struber	Sam Newfield	
1948	Abbott and Costello Meet Frankenstein	Lawrence Talbot	Charles Barton	co-starring Bela Lugosi and Glenn Strange
1948	16 Fathoms Deep	Mr. Demitri	Irving Allen	Remake of the 1934 film, starring Lloyd Bridges
1949	There's a Girl in My Heart	John Colton, music hall owner	Arthur Dreifuss	
1950	Captain China	Red Lynch	Lewis R. Foster	
1950	Once a Thief	Gus	W. Lee Wilder	starring Cesar Romero
1951	Inside Straight	Shocker Ninkovitch	Gerald Mayer	
1951	Only the Valiant	Trooper Kebussyan	Gordon Douglas	
1951	Behave Yourself!	Pinky	George Beck	
1951	Bride of the Gorilla	Police Commissioner Taro	Curt Siodmak	
1951	Flame of Araby	Borka Barbarossa	Charles Lamont	
1952	The Bushwhackers	Artemus Taylor	Rod Amateau	starring John Ireland
1952	Thief of Damascus	Sinbad	Will Jason	filmed in Technicolor
1952	High Noon	Martin Howe	Fred Zinnemann	starring Gary Cooper
1952	Springfield Rifle	Pete Elm	Andre de Toth	starring Gary Cooper
1952	The Black Castle	Henchman Gargon	Nathan H. Juran	co-starring Boris Karloff
1952	Battles of Chief Pontiac	Chief Pontiac	Felix E. Feist	starring Lex Barker
1953	Bandit Island	Kip, a robber	Arthur Hilton	25-minute novelty short filmed in 3-D; later released in 2-D in 1954 as The Big Chase
1953	Raiders of the Seven Seas	Peg Leg	Sidney Salkow	
1953	A Lion Is in the Streets	Spurge McManamee	Raoul Walsh	starring James Cagney
1954	Jivaro	Pedro Martines	Edward Ludwig	filmed in 3-D
1954	The Boy from Oklahoma	Crazy Charlie	Michael Curtiz	
1954	Casanova's Big Night	Emo	Norman Z. McLeod	co-stars Vincent Price, Basil Rathbone and John Carradine
1954	Passion	Castro	Allan Dwan	
1954	The Black Pirates	Padre Felipe	Allen H. Miner	
1955	Big House, U.S.A.	Alamo Smith	Howard W. Koch	co-starring Broderick Crawford and Charles Bronson
1955	The Silver Star	John Harmon	Richard Bartlett	
1955	Not as a Stranger	Job Marsh	Stanley Kramer	co-starring Broderick Crawford
1955	I Died a Thousand Times	Big Mac	Stuart Heisler	
1955	The Indian Fighter	Chivington	Andre de Toth	starring Kirk Douglas
1956	Manfish	"Swede"	W. Lee Wilder	Based on Edgar Allan Poe's The Gold Bug
1956	Indestructible Man	Charles "Butcher" Benton	Jack Pollexfen	
1956	The Black Sleep	Mungo	Reginald LeBorg	co-starring Bela Lugosi, Basil Rathbone and John Carradine
1956	Pardners	Whitey	Norman Taurog	starring Dean Martin and Jerry Lewis
1956	Daniel Boone, Trail Blazer	Chief Blackfish	Albert Gannaway, Ismael Rodríguez	starring Bruce Bennett; filmed in Color in Mexico
1957	The Cyclops	Martin 'Marty' Melville	Bert I. Gordon	
1958	The Defiant Ones	Big Sam	Stanley Kramer	starring Sidney Poitier and Tony Curtis
1958	Money, Women and Guns	Art Birdwell	Richard Bartlett	
1959	The Alligator People	Manon	Roy Del Ruth	
1960	La Casa del Terror/ House of Terror	Chaney plays A Mummy and a Werewolf	Gilberto Martínez Solares	Chaney footage from this Mexican film was later re-edited into a 1965 Jerry Warren film called Face of the Screaming Werewolf
1961	Rebellion in Cuba (aka Chivato)	Gordo	Albert C. Gannaway	co-starring Jake LaMotta
1961	The Phantom	Jed	Harold Daniels	Unsold pilot for a TV series
1961	The Devil's Messenger	Satan	Herbert L. Strock	This film was re-edited from various episodes of a 1959 TV show called 13 Demon Street
1963	The Haunted Palace	Simon Orne	Roger Corman	starred Vincent Price; based on an H. P. Lovecraft novel
1964	Law of the Lawless	Tiny	William F. Claxton	First of eight westerns Chaney made for A. C. Lyles from 1964-1968
1964	Witchcraft	Morgan Whitlock	Don Sharp	filmed in England
1964	Stage to Thunder Rock	Henry "Harry" Parker	William F. Claxton	produced by A. C. Lyles
1965	Young Fury	Bartender	Christian Nyby	produced by A. C. Lyles
1965	Face of the Screaming Werewolf	A mummy/werewolf	Jerry Warren	this film was re-edited from a 1960 Mexican film called La Casa del Terror
1965	Black Spurs	Gus Kile	R. G. Springsteen	produced by A. C. Lyles
1965	Town Tamer	Mayor Charlie Leach	Lesley Selander	produced by A. C. Lyles
1965	Apache Uprising	Charlie Russell	R. G. Springsteen	produced by A. C. Lyles
1965	House of the Black Death	Belial Desard, a warlock	Jerry Warren	Initially released theatrically as Blood of the Man-Devil, the title was later changed for TV; co-starring John Carradine
1966	Johnny Reno	Sheriff Hodges	R.G. Springsteen	produced by A. C. Lyles
1967	Dr. Terror's Gallery of Horrors	Dr. Mendel	David L. Hewitt	aka The Blood Suckers; later shown on TV as Return From the Past; co-starring John Carradine
1967	Hillbillys in a Haunted House	Maximillian	Jean Yarbrough	co-starring John Carradine and Basil Rathbone
1967	Welcome to Hard Times	Avery the bartender	Burt Kennedy	starring Henry Fonda and Warren Oates
1967	Spider Baby	Bruno	Jack Hill	later re-released as The Liver Eaters
1968	The Far Out West	Chief Eagle Shadow		Compilation film composed of footage from various episodes of a 1966 TV series called Pistols 'n' Petticoats
1968	Buckskin	Sheriff Tangely	Michael D. Moore	last of the eight westerns Chaney made for A. C. Lyles from 1964 to 1968; Aka The Frontiersman
1968	Fireball Jungle	Sammy, the junkyard owner	Jose Priete	starring John Russell
1970	A Stranger in Town	Doc Whitaker	Earl J. Miller	Made-for-educational-TV movie, later retitled The Children's West
1971	The Female Bunch	Monty, a drug dealer	Al Adamson, John Cardos	shot in 1969, but not released until September 1, 1971
1971	Dracula vs. Frankenstein	Groton the zombie	Al Adamson	Chaney's last film, shot in 1969 but not released until September 20, 1971 (filmed before The Female Bunch but released afterwards)

== Television appearances ==
- Versatile Varieties (1949–1950)
- The Life of Riley unaired pilot (late 1940s)
- The Colgate Comedy Hour NBC (1951)
- Cosmopolitan Theatre DuMont (November 6, 1951) One-hour episode The Last Concerto
- Tales of Tomorrow ABC (January 18, 1952) Episode Frankenstein
- You Asked For It ABC (1952)
- Schlitz Playhouse of Stars CBS (September 25, 1952) Episode The Trial
- The Red Skelton Show CBS (1953)
- The Whistler (1954) Episode Backfire
- Jack London's Tales of Adventure (1954) Unaired pilot
- Cavalcade of America ABC (May 18, 1954) Episode Moonlight School
- Cavalcade of America ABC (May 3, 1955) Episode Stay On, Stranger
- Flight From Adventure (1955) Unaired pilot
- Masquerade Party Quiz Show, ABC (1955)
- Climax! CBS (January 26, 1956) One-hour episode The Secret of River Lane
- Telephone Time CBS (April 8, 1956) Episode The Golden Junkman
- Studio 57 DuMont (August 12, 1956) Episode The Ballad of Jubal Pickett
- Hawkeye and the Last of the Mohicans (1957) Chaney was a regular on this television series, portraying the role of Chingachgook in all 39 episodes
- Along the Mohawk Trail, Redmen and the Renegades, Long Rifle and the Tomahawk, and Pathfinder and the Mohican (1957) - These four Made-for-TV feature films were composed of various re-edited episodes of Chaney's 1957 Hawkeye TV series
- Climax! CBS (September 19, 1957) One-hour episode Necessary Evil
- Target (1958) Anthology show
- The Red Skelton Show CBS (1958)
- Truth or Consequences Quiz Show, NBC (1958)
- The Rough Riders ABC (January 15, 1959) Episode An Eye for an Eye
- Rawhide CBS (February 6, 1959) One-hour episode Incident on the Edge of Madness
- 13 Demon Street (1959) Chaney was the eerie host of this unaired horror anthology series filmed in Sweden; three random episodes were later re-edited into a 1962 feature film called The Devil's Messenger
- Border Patrol (1959) Episode The Homecoming
- Have Gun - Will Travel CBS (February 14, 1959) Episode Scorched Feather
- General Electric Theater CBS (February 22, 1959) Episode Family Man
- The Texan CBS (March 9, 1959) Episode No Love Wanted
- Tombstone Territory ABC (June 12, 1959) Episode The Black Marshal from Deadwood
- Wanted: Dead or Alive CBS (October 10, 1959) Episode The Hostage
- Adventures in Paradise ABC (October 12, 1959) One-hour episode The Black Pearl
- Lock-Up (1960) 30-minute episode
- Johnny Ringo CBS (March 3, 1960) Episode The Raffertys
- Bat Masterson NBC (October 13, 1960) Episode Bat Trap
- Wagon Train NBC (October 26, 1960) Episode The Jose Morales Story
- The Phantom Unsold TV pilot (1961)
- Stagecoach West ABC (February 7, 1961) One-hour episode Not in Our Stars
- Klondike NBC (February 13, 1961) Episode The Hostages
- Zane Grey Theatre CBS (March 23, 1961) Episode A Warm Day in Heaven
- The Deputy NBC (April 15, 1961) Episode Brother in Arms
- Wagon Train NBC (May 24, 1961) One-hour episode The Chalice
- Surfside Six ABC (October 23, 1961) One-hour episode Witness for the Defense
- Route 66 CBS (November 10, 1961) One-hour episode The Mud Nest
- The Rifleman ABC (January 18, 1962) Episode Gunfire
- Lawman ABC (January 28, 1962) Episode The Tarnished Badge
- Here's Hollywood (Summer of 1962) Interview show
- Route 66 CBS (October 26, 1962) One-hour episode Lizard's Leg and Owlet's Wing (co-starred Peter Lorre and Boris Karloff)
- Gunslinger CBS (1961) One-hour episode
- Rawhide CBS (January 18, 1963) One-hour episode Incident at Spider Rock
- Have Gun - Will Travel CBS (February 16, 1963) Episode Cage at McNab
- Empire NBC (March 26, 1963) One-hour episode Hidden Asset
- Route 66 CBS (October 11, 1963) One-hour episode Come Out, Come Out, Wherever You Are
- Route 66 CBS (April 24, 1964) One-hour episode, title unknown
- Pistols 'n' Petticoats CBS (1966-1967 season) Chaney played Chief Eagle Shadow on four episodes; several episodes were later compiled into a 1968 feature film called The Far Out West
- The Monkees NBC (October 24, 1966) Chaney played Lenny in episode Monkees in a Ghost Town (1966)
- The Pat Boone Show (1967) Variety show
- Chaney appeared in a TV commercial for Proctor and Gamble's Bold Detergent (1967)
- Star Close-Up (1969) British interview show
- A Stranger in Town (1970) TV movie, re-released in 1971 as The Children's West
- The Tonight Show NBC (October 8, 1969) Chaney appeared as a guest
- Chaney appeared in a TV Pontiac truck commercial co-starring Henry Brandon (1969)

== Select radio credits ==
- Inner Sanctum – "Ring of Doom" (1943)
- The Abbott and Costello Show (June 2, 1948)

== Bibliography ==
- Smith, Don G., Lon Chaney Jr, Horror Film Star, 1906–1973, (1996). ISBN 0-7864-1813-3.
