= Traffic in Crime =

1946 film by Lesley Selander

- Theatrical release poster
- Directed by: Lesley Selander
- Screenplay by: David Lang
- Story by: Leslie T. White
- Produced by: Donald H. Brown
- Starring: Kane Richmond; Anne Nagel; Adele Mara; Wade Crosby; Wilton Graff; Roy Barcroft
- Cinematography: Bud Thackery
- Edited by: Lester Orlebeck
- Music by: Mort Glickman
- Production company: Republic Pictures
- Distributed by: Republic Pictures
- Release date: June 28, 1946
- Running time: 56 minutes
- Country: United States
- Language: English

Traffic in Crime is a 1946 American action film directed by Lesley Selander, written by David Lang, and starring Kane Richmond, Anne Nagel, Adele Mara, Wade Crosby, Wilton Graff and Roy Barcroft. It was released on June 28, 1946, by Republic Pictures.

== Cast ==
- Kane Richmond as Sam Wire
- Anne Nagel as Ann Marlowe
- Adele Mara as Silk Cantrell
- Wade Crosby as Dumbo
- Wilton Graff as Nick Cantrell
- Roy Barcroft as Insp. Tip Hogan
- Dick Curtis as Jake Schultz
- Arthur Loft as Police Chief Jim Murphy
- Harry Cheshire as Dan Marlowe
- Robert J. Wilke as Hogan's Driver
- Earle Hodgins as Bartender
- Horace Murphy as Joe
- Charles Sullivan as Cab Driver
- Ernie Adams as Counter Man
- Budd Buster as Watchman
