= Strange Confession =

1945 film by John Hoffman

- Theatrical release poster
- Directed by: John Hoffman
- Screenplay by: M. Coates Webster
- Story by: Jean Bart
- Based on: Inner Sanctum Mystery by Himan Brown
- Produced by: Ben Pivar
- Starring: Lon Chaney Jr.; J. Carrol Naish; Brenda Joyce
- Cinematography: Maury Gertsman
- Edited by: Russell F. Schoengarth
- Music by: Frank Skinner
- Production company: Universal Pictures
- Distributed by: Universal Pictures
- Release date: October 5, 1945 (United States)
- Running time: 62 minutes
- Country: United States
- Language: English

Strange Confession is a 1945 noir-mystery horror film directed by John Hoffman and starring Lon Chaney Jr., J. Carrol Naish and Brenda Joyce. It is the fifth installment in The Inner Sanctum Mysteries anthological film series, which was based on the popular radio series of the same name. Released by Universal Pictures, the movie was later rereleased under the title The Missing Head.

== Plot ==
Jeff Carter (Lon Chaney Jr.) is testing a vaccine for influenza. He is working for tycoon Roger Graham (J. Carrol Naish), who takes the credit for Jeff's discovery and cares more about profits than safety. Jeff resigns and is blacklisted by his boss.

Jeff heads to South America to perfect the formula. Graham has used this opportunity to release the drug and romance Jeff's attractive wife, Mary (Brenda Joyce). When Jeff hears that his son has died, he takes revenge.

== Cast ==
- Lon Chaney Jr. as Jeff Carter
- Brenda Joyce as Mary Carter
- J. Carrol Naish as Roger Graham
- Milburn Stone as Stevens
- Lloyd Bridges as Dave Curtis
- Addison Richards as Dr. Williams
- Mary Gordon as Mrs. O'Connor
- George Chandler as Harper
- Wilton Graff as Brandon
- Francis McDonald as José Hernandez
- Jack Norton as Jack
- Christian Rub as Mr. Moore
- Wheaton Chambers as Mr. Reed
- William Desmond as Peanut Vendor
- Jack Perrin as Cop
- Beatrice Roberts as Miss Rogers
- Ian Wolfe as Frederick

== Critical reception ==
Describing the film in TV Guide as "One of the stronger entries in Universal's Inner Sanctum series," critic Craig Butler wrote that it was "tidily entertaining" and "a solidly entertaining way to kill an hour." Writing in DVD Talk, critic David Cornelius described the film as "twenty minutes of pretty good movie mixed with ten minutes of a pretty good movie of an entirely other kind, then spread across thirty more minutes of drabness." Reviewer David Kalat wrote for Turner Classic Movies that unlike most B-movies, the film "tried to dramatize the problems of pharmaceutical companies rushing untested drugs to market - fewer still have dialogue like, 'He had my brain in his head and I had to get my brain back.'"
