= The Shadow of Silk Lennox =

1935 film by Jack Nelson

- French poster
- Directed by: Ray Kirkwood; Jack Nelson
- Written by: Norman Springer (screenplay); Norman Springer (story "The Riot Squad")
- Produced by: Ray Kirkwood
- Starring: Lon Chaney Jr.
- Cinematography: Robert E. Cline
- Edited by: Holbrook N. Todd
- Music by: Dean Benton
- Distributed by: Commodore Pictures
- Release date: December 1935
- Running time: 60 minutes
- Country: United States
- Language: English

The Shadow of Silk Lennox is a 1935 American crime drama film directed by Ray Kirkwood and Jack Nelson and starring Lon Chaney Jr before his breakthrough into horror films. Norman Springer wrote the screenplay, adapted from his own story The Riot Squad.

== Plot ==
John Arthur "Silk" Lennox is an underworld chieftain who runs a nightclub where society patrons come to rub elbows with the criminal set. He is nicknamed Silk because of his fondness for the expression that things are "fine as silk". From the club he directs a violent $50,000 bank heist and cheekily invites in two detectives, using them to establish his alibi. While the robbery is in progress, he gets his new singer Jimmy Lambert to play a recording over the intercom that makes it appear as if his men are on the premises.

When Deacon, the gangster holding the stolen money, tries to skip town, Silk has him killed at the train station. The money is not found on his body, but the gang suspects that it is hidden in the express office. Meanwhile, Jimmy has realised that the recording will help convict Silk of the robbery and with Nola, the dance partner in his act, plans to use it against him.

As the law closes in and his allies turn against him, Silk is arrested but has to be released when witnesses, afraid of reprisals, refuse to identify him. In the police line-up, Silk meets "Fingers" Smalley, who agrees to break open the express office safe. After establishing an alibi at the club, Silk and Fingers leave for the office, but the police arrive as Fingers opens the safe. Silk is killed during the ensuing gunfight and Fingers explains that he is really an undercover police agent named Ferguson.

== Cast ==
- Lon Chaney Jr. as John Arthur "Silk" Lennox
- Dean Benton as Jimmy Lambert
- Marie Burton as Nola Travers
- Jack Mulhall as Ferguson, alias "Fingers" Farley
- Eddie Gribbon as Henchman Lefty Sloan
- Larry McGrath
- Allen Greer as Henchman Dutch
- Theodore Lorch as Kennedy, the ward-heeler
- Frank Niemann as Nightclub Band Leader

== Soundtrack ==
- "Love Is In the Way" (Words and music by Dean Benton)
- "Forgotten Melodies" (Words and music by Dean Benton)
- "Walkin' in the Dark" (Words and music by Dean Benton)
