= Keeping Fit =

- Directed by: Arthur Lubin
- Screenplay by: Paul Huston
- Produced by: Will Cowan
- Production company: Universal
- Release date: 26 October 1942
- Running time: 10 mins
- Country: USA
- Language: English

Keeping Fit is a 1942 American short film made by Universal Pictures about the importance of keeping fit in war time. It is noticeable for its cast which includes Lon Chaney Jr., Robert Stack, Andy Devine, Dick Foran and Broderick Crawford, all of whom were under contract to Universal.

It was directed by Arthur Lubin.

== Cast ==
- Robert Stack as Bob - Factory Worker
- Broderick Crawford as Brod - Factory Worker
- Andy Devine as Andy - Factory Worker
- Anne Gwynne as Nurse
- Irene Hervey as Irene - Dick's Wife
- Lon Chaney Jr. as Lon - Factory Worker
- Dick Foran as Dick
- Louise Allbritton as Miss Allbritton
- Don Porter as Don - Co-worker
- Ralph Morgan as Dr. Morgan - Factory Doctor
- Mary Wickes as Ann - Andy's wife
- Russell Hicks as Plant Manager
- Mary Gordon as Mary - Irene's Friend
- Susan Levine as Susie - Irene and Dick's Girl
