= Sixteen Fathoms Deep =

1934 American film by Armand Schaefer

- Directed by: Armand Schaefer
- Written by: Barry Barringer; Norman Houston
- Based on: the American magazine story by Eustace L. Adams
- Produced by: Paul Malvern
- Starring: Sally O'Neil; Lon Chaney Jr. Russell Simpson
- Production company: Paul Malvern Productions
- Distributed by: Monogram Pictures
- Release date: 18 January 1934 (New York)
- Running time: 58 minutes
- Country: United States
- Language: English

Sixteen Fathoms Deep is a 1934 American film directed by Armand Schaefer and starring Lon Chaney Jr, Sally O'Neil and Russell Simpson. It was an early leading role for Chaney, then billed under his birth name "Creighton Chaney".

== Plot ==
A sponge diver, Joe Bethel, hopes to make enough money to buy his own boat and marry his fiancée, Rosie. He must deal with a villainous fellow diver, Savanis.

== Cast ==
- Sally O'Neil as Rosie
- Lon Chaney Jr. as Joe Bethel (billed as "Creighton Chaney")
- Russell Simpson as A. B. Crockett
- Maurice Black as Nick
- Jack Kennedy as Mike
- George Regas as Savanis
- Constantine Romanoff as Kargas
- Richard Alexander as Martin
- Raul S. Figarola as Chinchin
- Lloyd Ingraham as Old Athos
- Robert Kortman as Cimos
- Si Jenks as Sculpin

== Production ==
O'Neil made the film after missing out on the role in Sitting Pretty (1933) to Ginger Rogers.

== Reception ==
The New York Times called Sixteen Fathoms Deep a "good swaggering specimen" of action melodrama, "exciting, plausible and a lot of fun."
