= The Marriage Bargain =

- Directed by: Albert Ray
- Production company: Screencraft Productions
- Distributed by: First Division Pictures
- Release date: 1935
- Country: USA
- Language: English

The Marriage Bargain is a 1935 American drama film directed by Albert Ray and starring Lila Lee and Lon Chaney Jr. It was the last film in which Lon Chaney Jr was billed under his real name Creighton Chaney.

It was also known under the alternative title of Woman of Destiny.
