= Calling Dr. Death =

1943 film by Reginald LeBorg

- Official poster
- Directed by: Reginald LeBorg
- Screenplay by: Edward Dein
- Starring: Lon Chaney Jr.: Patricia Morison; J. Carrol Naish; Ramsay Ames
- Cinematography: Virgil Miller
- Edited by: Norman A. Cerf
- Production company: Universal Pictures Company, Inc.
- Distributed by: Universal Pictures Company, Inc.
- Release date: 17 December 1943
- Running time: 63 minutes
- Country: United States

Calling Dr. Death is a 1943 mystery film, and the first installment in The Inner Sanctum Mysteries anthological film series, which was based on the popular radio series of the same name, the film stars Chaney Jr. and Patricia Morison, and was directed by Reginald LeBorg. Chaney Jr. plays a neurologist, Dr. Mark Steele, who loses memory of the past few days after learning that his wife has been brutally murdered. Aware of his wife's infidelity and believing he could be the killer, Steele asks his office nurse Stella Madden to help him recover his lost memories.

== Plot ==
A respected neurologist, Dr. Mark Steele (Lon Chaney Jr.) treats his patients successfully with hypnosis, but has troubles of his own from a marriage falling apart, that he cannot treat himself in the same way. His wife Maria (Ramsay Ames) is cheating on him on a regular basis, which he is well aware of. When Maria returns home one night in the early morning hours after a rendez-vous with her lover, Mark finally tells her that he has had enough and that he wants a divorce. Maria, who is leading a very comfortable life as a doctor's wife, refuses her consent to a divorce, and laughs at him as she does so. That night Steele has a dream about strangling his wife to death.

When Maria goes away for the weekend, Steele decides to leave and gets into his car and drives off. Come Monday morning he wakes up in his office only to learn that he is suffering a mental blackout and that the memories of the weekend is missing. He is informed by the police that his wife has been murdered, and that her face was disfigured by some kind of acid. Distraught, the doctor begins to worry about not remembering the slightest thing about his own actions during the weekend.

His worries increase after finding a button from his own jacket near where his wife's body was found. He starts suspecting that he himself has done away with her. His nurse, Stella Madden (Patricia Morison) tells him not to air his suspicions to the police until he knows more. The police go on to arrest Maria's lover, an architect named Robert Duval (David Bruce), for the murder. Inspector Gregg (J. Carroll Naish), one of the detectives on the case, still believes that Dr. Steele is the murderer. Duval's disabled wife (Fay Helm) pays the doctor a visit, trying to convince him to help her prove that her husband is innocent.

Duval’s case against him soon goes to trial and is eventually convicted of first degree murder. The penalty being sentenced to death. In a moment of guilt, Steele gets the idea to hypnotize himself to find out if he really is the real murderer. The hypnosis, however, is not completed because Inspector Gregg arrives and interrupts. Nurse Stella does make an audio recording of the session though, and on the audio Dr. Steele talks about meeting up with his wife at a cabin in the mountains. He also tells of having a quarrel with her and leaving the cabin just as Duval arrives, going straight to his office and needing relief, he sedates himself into deep sleep. The Inspector is diligent and listens to the recording, but still seems to suspect the doctor of being the actual murderer.

Curious and craving for information, Steele visits the incarcerated Duval and finds out that he borrowed $10,000 from Maria in order to pay off some gambling debts. After the visit Steele hears that Duval's request for pardoning has been denied by the governor. He talks to nurse Stella, who faints right in front of him in the office. The doctor assumes that the nurse is stressed from too much work. He suggests hiring another nurse as a secretary to handle the bills for the time being, and drives Stella to visit her family.

Upon his return to the office, Steele gets a visit from Inspector Gregg. He is confronted with the fact that there's a connection between the doctor’s private clinic and the acid used on the face of his murdered wife. Steele realizes there might be more at stake than he first thought and decides to hypnotize Stella, to see if she knows more than she is letting him believe. On the night of Duval's scheduled execution, with very little time left, Dr. Steele tries to bring calmness to the situation, and proceeds to hypnotize Stella. Under hypnosis, she tells him the truth about her plan together with Duval, to get the $10,000 and that she killed Maria when Duval tried to give the money back. She also admits having tried to burn down the medical office, destroying numerous records, to cover the fact that she had been embezzling from him. Inspector Gregg overhears this and arrests Stella, explaining to Steele that he had never really suspected him, but needed to gather evidence against Stella.

== Cast ==
Cast is sourced from the book Universal Horrors.

- Lon Chaney Jr. as Dr. Mark Steele
- Patricia Morison as Stella Madden
- J. Carrol Naish as Insp. Gregg
- Ramsay Ames as Maria Steele
- David Bruce as Robert Duval
- Fay Helm as Mrs. Duval
- Holmes Herbert as Bryant
- Alec Craig as Bill
- Mary Hale as Marion
- Fred Giermann as Father
- Lisa Golm as Mother
- George Eldredge as District Attorney
- Charles Wagenheim as Coroner
- John Elliott as Priest

== Production ==
"Though LeBorg was unhappy with being assigned to what he felt was a routine horror film, he did an excellent job with time and resources at his command...he was a master at creating the proper mood and atmosphere for a horror film, and during this period, horror films were hot at the box office." —Biographer Wheeler Winston Dixon in The Films of Reginald LeBorg (1992)

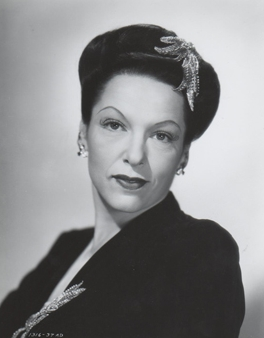
Gale Sondergaard (pictured) was considered for the role of Stella Madden but was replaced last minute by Patricia Morison.

Calling Dr. Death was the first film in the "Inner Sanctum Mystery" series. In June 1943, Universal purchased the screen rights to the series from Simon and Schuster, Inc. who were publishers of the popular mystery novels and radio shows. Simon and Schuster were using the title Inner Sanctum for their series of mystery novels they had published starting in the 1930s. The radio adaptations had initially started in January 1941 on the NBC Blue Network and was broadcast weekly. Ben Pivar of Universal sought out a suitable entry for the first film in the series, and purchased an original screenplay by freelance writer Edward Dein titled Calling Dr. Death. Dein had previously worked on various mystery films such as The Falcon, Lone Wolf and Boston Blackie series. Dein later reflected on his work at Universal, stating that he worked there "as a reader for a few weeks, which was another horror story. We called this the Snake Pit. In those days, we were not considered to be prolific writers; we were hacks." The Inner Sanctum Mysteries feature a "stream of consciousness" voiceover which Dein stated he incorporated into his script at Lon Chaney Jr.'s insistence. Dein stated that Chaney felt the dialogue was too technical and he couldn't say the words. LeBorg stated it was both Chaney and Pivar who suggested it, stating "Pivar was very, very crude, not very intelligent, and he couldn't read very well."

Lon Chaney Jr. was hopeful for the series, craving diversity in his roles after Universal had placed him in various monster roles in their horror films. Pivar planned to produce two Inner Sanctum mystery films a year with each film featuring Chaney and Gale Sondergaard in the lead roles. Director Reginald LeBorg was chosen by Pivar to direct the film, with LeBorg recalling that "Pivar had confidence in me because I was a fighter who tried to get better and better material."

Just before filming was set to begin, Sondergaard was dropped from the cast and her role was rewritten and given to Patricia Morison. LeBorg speculated that Sondergaard was dropped from the film as "she was a leftist and she and her husband [Herbert J. Biberman] were shooting their mouths off quite often." Calling Dr. Death went into production on October 25, 1943, and was finished filming in 20 days. Patricia Morison recalled working on the film with Chaney, stating she "didn't get to know him terribly well - he was a rather shy man, but I enjoyed working with him very much. He was very nice to me."

== Release ==
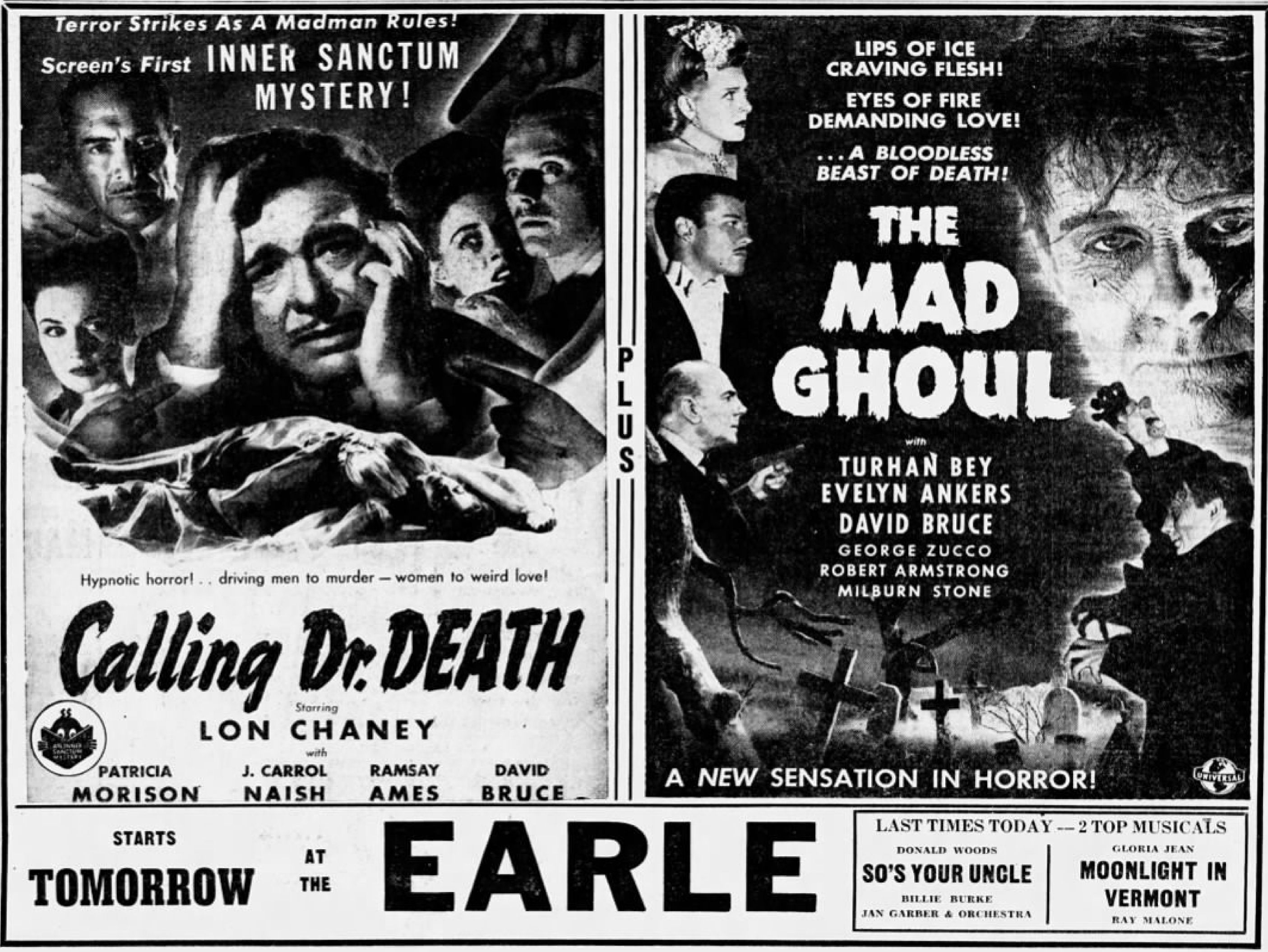
Earle Theater poster for the double feature, 14 January 1944 Allentown PA

Calling Dr. Death was distributed by Universal on December 17, 1943. It was later theatrically shown as a double feature with The Mad Ghoul.

The film was followed by the second Inner Sanctum film that was also directed by LeBorg, titled Weird Woman. It was released on April 14, 1944.

== Reception ==
From contemporary reviews, A. H. Weiler wrote in The New York Times that the film was "mildly interesting but not thrilling. [I]t has a dreary habit of talking itself out of promising situations" and that Chaney's voice-overs dissipated the suspense. Dorothy Masters of The New York Daily News opined that if "Reginald LeBorg been as masterful with his cast as he was with the script, Calling Dr. Death could have been a most promising introduction to Universal's new "Inner Sanctum" series" and concluded that the film was "good enough for everyday consumption, and likely to encourage an appreciable following." The Hollywood Reporter found LeBorg's direction was "filled with imaginative touches and extracts a maximum of suspense from the psychological plot" and that Chaney "gives an arresting portrayal of the doctor."

From retrospective reviews, the authors of the book Universal Horrors declared the series "feeble melodramas with little to recommend them beyond their camp qualities and the morose spectacle of seeing a badly miscast Chaney struggle his way through acting assignments that were painfully beyond his depth." They concluded that the series were "generally regarded by buffs and film historians as a missed cinematic opportunity."
