= Marvin (horror host) =

Terry Bennett as "Marvin"

Marvin was a television horror host, played by Terry Bennett, who originally appeared on Chicago's WBKB from 1957 to 1959.

It began with a dark night sky, broken by long fingers of lightning that ripped down from the sky. Deep-throated thunder followed, and another flash of lightning. That dark old house would then appear on the TV screen, dark but for a patch of light glowing through a cellar window. Down there, in the cellar, Marvin would be waiting for us....

Premiering at 10 p.m. on December 7, 1957, Marvin (sometimes called Marvin the Near-Sighted Madman) hosted Shock Theatre, presenting horror films late Saturday nights. His character was a demented beatnik who wore thick glasses and a black turtle neck sweater, and was an instant hit.

Marvin's companion was his wife, who he only referred to as "Dear." Viewers never saw her face, as the camera was always behind her, or her face was obscured by a mask. Marvin would constantly perform experiments or amputations on "Dear", but she would always be back to normal by the next commercial break. "Dear" was played by Bennett's real-life wife, Joy Bennett.

While Bennett played mostly for laughs, poking fun at the movies, he occasionally frightened his audience as well. The show became so popular that station management soon expanded the series with a new half hour segment after the movie called The Shocktale Party. Marvin was joined by several other characters: "Orville", a hunchback, "Shorty", a giant wearing a rubber Frankenstein mask, and a band called "The Deadbeats", who were members of the Art VanDamme quintet, and wore white makeup with black circles around their eyes. Bennett wrote and arranged much of the music himself, as he did on his morning children's show, The Jobblewocky Place.

The show spawned a fan club, and letters and presents soon began to pour in. While Bennett became a genuine Saturday night celebrity, some parents objected to his portraying Marvin and hosting The Jobblewocky Place at the same time, fearing that the Marvin character was the real identity.

When Shock Theater was cancelled in 1959 to make way for ABC's Fight Of The Week, fans petitioned the station to bring the show back, drawing thousands of signatures, but to no avail. On the last episode of Shock Theatre, viewers finally got to see what "Dear" looked like. At the close of the show, Marvin turned to her and asked her to say good-bye to the audience, whereupon she turned around and did just that.
