= Wilton Graff =

American actor (1903–1969)

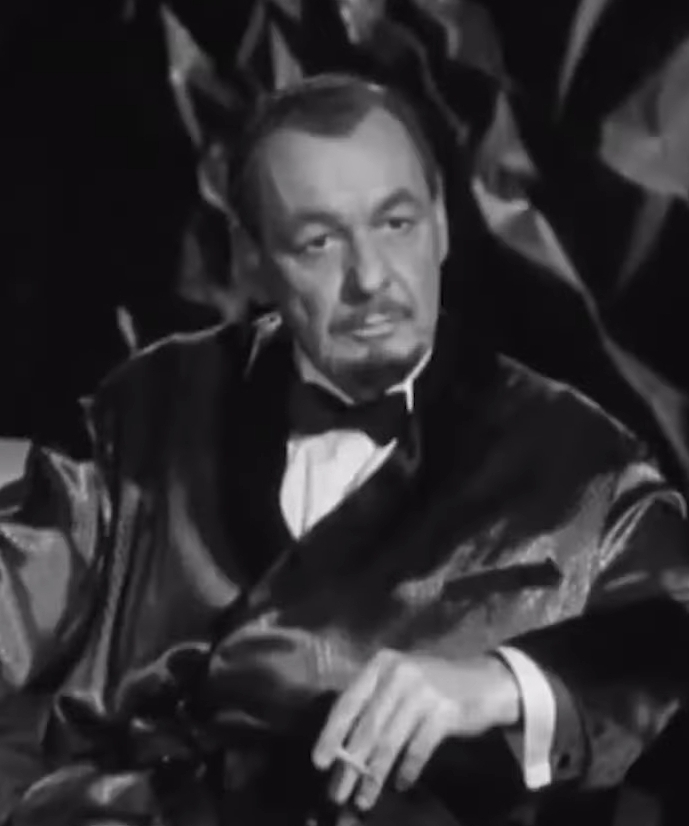
- Graff in Bloodlust! (1961)
- Born: Wilton Calvert Ratcliffe; August 13, 1903; St. Louis, Missouri, U.S.
- Died: January 13, 1969 (aged 65); Pacific Palisades, California, U.S.
- Occupation: Actor
- Years active: 1939–1964
- Spouses: Mary Goodwin (m. 1938; died 1950) Elizabeth W. Wilson (m. 1952)
- Children: 1

Wilton Graff (born Wilton Calvert Ratcliffe; August 13, 1903 – January 13, 1969) was an American actor.

== Early years ==
Graff was the son of Mr. and Mrs. Joseph P. Graff. He graduated from West Hartford High School in 1921.

== Career ==
Before he became an actor, Graff worked for newspapers, including The Hartford Times, The Springfield Republican, and the Paris Herald.

Graff debuted on Broadway in Fantasia (1933). His last Broadway appearance was in Gabrielle (1941). He began working in movies in the 1940s and eventually appeared in dozens, usually as a professional man or an authority figure, such as a military officer. He starred in only one film, Bloodlust!, playing against type as an obvious, deranged villain. Most of his work in the last 10 years of his career was on television.

In 1956, he guest starred on James Arness's TV Western Series Gunsmoke, as “Troy Carver”, in the episode “20-20” (S1E19) as an aging lawman losing both his eyesight and his faith in his ability to handle his job.

== Death ==
Graff died in Pacific Palisades, California on January 14, 1969. He was 65 years old.

== Partial filmography ==
- Earl of Puddlestone (1940) – Mr. Thayer (uncredited)
- Jungle Queen (1945, Serial) – Courier (uncredited)
- A Royal Scandal (1945) – Russian General (uncredited)
- Earl Carroll Vanities (1945) – Mr. Thayer
- Counter-Attack (1945) – Russian Officer (uncredited)
- Gangs of the Waterfront (1945) – Police Commissioner Hogan
- Strange Confession (1945) – Brandon
- An Angel Comes to Brooklyn (1945) – Rodney Lloyd
- Pillow of Death (1945) – Police Captain McCracken
- Because of Him (1946) – Stage Manager (uncredited)
- Just Before Dawn (1946) – Alexander 'Alec' Girard (uncredited)
- The Phantom Thief (1946) – Rex Duncan
- Valley of the Zombies (1946) – Dr. Lucifer Garland
- Traffic in Crime (1946) – Nick Cantrell
- Avalanche (1946) – Jeremy Austin
- The Unknown (1946) – Ralph Martin
- Shadowed (1946) – Tony Montague
- Dead Reckoning (1947) – Surgeon (uncredited)
- The Web (1947) – District Attorney
- The Corpse Came C.O.D. (1947) – Maxwell Kenyon (uncredited)
- High Conquest (1947) – Mr. Douglaston
- They Won't Believe Me (1947) – Patrick Gold, Prosecuting Attorney (uncredited)
- Something in the Wind (1947) – Mr. Belton (uncredited)
- Bulldog Drummond Strikes Back (1947) – Cedric Mason
- Key Witness (1947) – Albert Loring
- Gentleman's Agreement (1947) – Maitre d' (uncredited)
- A Double Life (1947) – Dr. Mervin
- A Woman's Vengeance (1948) – Defending Counselor (uncredited)
- The Wreck of the Hesperus (1948) – Caleb Cross
- The Return of the Whistler (1948) – Dr. Bertram H. Grantland (uncredited)
- Who Killed Doc Robbin (1948) – Prosecutor
- Another Part of the Forest (1948) – Sam Taylor
- The Babe Ruth Story (1948) – Dr. Beldon (uncredited)
- The Gentleman from Nowhere (1948) – Larry Hendricks
- The Gallant Blade (1948) – Duc d'Orleans
- The Mozart Story (1948) – Antonio Salieri
- Family Honeymoon (1948) – Dr. Wilson (uncredited)
- The Dark Past (1948) – Frank Stevens
- Caught (1949) – Gentry (uncredited)
- Blondie's Big Deal (1949) – Joe Dillon
- Take Me Out to the Ball Game (1949) – Nick Donford (uncredited)
- Reign of Terror (1949) – Marquis de Lafayette (uncredited)
- Once More, My Darling (1949) – Mr. Frobisher
- And Baby Makes Three (1949) – Root (uncredited)
- Girls' School (1950) – Dave Vickers
- When Willie Comes Marching Home (1950) – General Chester Jans (uncredited)
- Mother Didn't Tell Me (1950) – Dr. Harold Jones (uncredited)
- Fortunes of Captain Blood (1950) – Captain Alvarado
- Rogues of Sherwood Forest (1950) – Baron Fitzwalter
- Convicted (1950) – Dr. Agar (scenes deleted)
- The West Point Story (1950) – Lieutenant Colonel Martin
- Mr. Imperium (1951) – Andrew Bolton (uncredited)
- My True Story (1951) – George Trent
- Night Into Morning (1951) – Attorney (uncredited)
- Mask of the Avenger (1951) – Count Dimorna (uncredited)
- Young Man with Ideas (1952) – Mr. Cardy
- Fearless Fagan (1952) – Colonel Horne
- Springfield Rifle (1952) – Colonel George Sharpe
- Something for the Birds (1952) – Taylor
- Operation Secret (1952) – French Official
- Million Dollar Mermaid (1952) – Garvey
- The I Don't Care Girl (1953) – Florenz 'Flo' Ziegfeld (uncredited)
- Lili (1953) – M. Tonit
- Scandal at Scourie (1953) – Mr. Leffington
- So This Is Love (1953) – Henry Erlanger, Producer (uncredited)
- Miss Sadie Thompson (1953) – Governor
- A Star Is Born (1954) – Shrine Auditorium Emcee (uncredited)
- The Sea Chase (1955) – Counsel General Hepke
- The Benny Goodman Story (1956) – John Hammond Sr.
- Lust for Life (1956) – Reverend Stricker
- Something of Value (1957) – Captain Hillary (uncredited)
- Tip on a Dead Jockey (1957) – John Rusk (uncredited)
- Perry Mason (1959) (Season 2, Episode 16: "The Case of the Fraudulent Photo") - Cleveland Blake
- Alfred Hitchcock Presents (1959) (Season 4 Episode 13: "Six People, No Music") - Fulton Agnew
- Alfred Hitchcock Presents (1959) (Season 4 Episode 33: "The Dusty Drawer") - Mr. A.M. Pinkson
- The Restless Gun (1959) - Episode "The Cavis Boy"
- Compulsion (1959) – Mr. Steiner
- Return to Peyton Place (1961) – Dr. Fowlkes (uncredited)
- Bloodlust! (1961) – Dr. Albert Balleau
- Sail a Crooked Ship (1961) – Simon J. Harrison
- The Alfred Hitchcock Hour (1963) (Season 1 Episode 32: "Death of a Cop") - George Chaney
- Lonnie (1963) – Mitchell
