= Pillow of Death =

1945 film by Wallace Fox

- Theatrical release poster
- Directed by: Wallace Fox
- Screenplay by: George Bricker
- Story by: Dwight V. Babcock
- Based on: Inner Sanctum Mystery by Himan Brown
- Produced by: Ben Pivar
- Starring: Lon Chaney Jr.; Brenda Joyce
- Cinematography: Jerome Ash
- Edited by: Edward Curtiss
- Music by: Frank Skinner
- Production company: Universal Pictures
- Distributed by: Universal Pictures
- Release date: December 14, 1945 (United States)
- Running time: 66 minutes
- Country: United States
- Language: English

Pillow of Death is a 1945 noir-mystery horror film, and the sixth installment in The Inner Sanctum Mysteries anthological film series, which was based on the popular radio series of the same name. Directed by Wallace Fox and starring Lon Chaney Jr. and Brenda Joyce; it was the only entry in the series to dispense with the introduction by a disembodied head in a crystal ball, as well as the only one to feature comic-relief characters to alleviate the grim tone.

== Plot ==
Attorney Wayne Fletcher intends to divorce his wife and marry his secretary, who comes from a wealthy family. When the wife is found suffocated to death, he naturally becomes the suspect. As others are killed in the same manner and a phony medium also claims Fletcher is guilty, Fletcher begins to imagine his dead wife is communicating with him, making it even more difficult for him to prove his innocence.

== Cast ==
- Lon Chaney Jr. as Wayne Fletcher (billed as Lon Chaney)
- Brenda Joyce as Donna Kincaid
- J. Edward Bromberg as Julian Julian
- Rosalind Ivan as Amelia Kincaid
- Clara Blandick as Belle Kincaid
- George Cleveland as Sam Kincaid
- Wilton Graff as Cap'n McCracken
- Bernard Thomas as Bruce Malone (billed as Bernard B. Thomas)
