= Man-Made Monster =

1941 film by George Waggner

- Theatrical release poster
- Directed by: George Waggner
- Screenplay by: George Waggner
- Story by: H.J. Essex; Len Golos; Sid Schwartz
- Produced by: Jack Bernhard
- Starring: Lon Chaney Jr.; Lionel Atwill
- Cinematography: Elwood Bredell
- Edited by: Arthur Hilton
- Production company: Universal Pictures
- Distributed by: Universal Pictures
- Release date: March 28, 1941
- Running time: 60 minutes
- Country: United States
- Language: English
- Budget: $84,000

Man-Made Monster is a 1941 American science-fiction horror film directed by George Waggner and produced by Jack Bernhard for Universal Pictures. Filmed in black-and-white, it stars Lon Chaney Jr. (in his horror film debut) and Lionel Atwill. Man-Made Monster was re-released under various titles including Electric Man and The Mysterious Dr. R. Realart Pictures re-released the film in 1953 under the title The Atomic Monster as a double feature with The Flying Saucer (1950). On the film's original main title, there is no hyphen; it's simply Man Made Monster.

The plot resembles The Invisible Ray (1936), The Walking Dead (1936), and two decades later Indestructible Man (1956); that much later feature starred Chaney but was not directly inspired by Man-Made Monster.

== Plot ==
A bus hits a high power line, killing all on board except for one Dan McCormick, who survives because he is immune to the deadly electricity. McCormick does a sideshow exhibit as Dynamo Dan, the Electric Man and is taken in by Dr. John Lawrence, who wants to study him., Lawrence's colleague, mad scientist Dr. Paul Rigas, wants to create an army of electrobiologically-driven zombies. He gives McCormick progressively higher doses of electricity until his mind is ruined and left dependent on the addictive electrical charges. This temporarily gives McCormick the touch of death, making him capable of killing anyone he touches by electrocution. After accidentally killing Lawrence, Rigas ensures McCormick's conviction to see what will happen if he is sent to the electric chair. McCormick survives and escapes, and with a super charge in his glowing body encased in a protective rubber suit he kills several people at the prison, and later Rigas, before becoming entangled on a barbed wire fence which tears his rubber suit, causing the electricity to drain out into the wire and McCormick to die.

== Cast ==
- Lionel Atwill as Dr. Paul Rigas
- Lon Chaney Jr. as Dan McCormick
- Anne Nagel as June Lawrence
- Frank Albertson as Mark Adams
- Samuel S. Hinds as Dr. John Lawrence
- William B. Davidson as Ralph Stanley, the district attorney
- Ben Taggart as Detective sergeant
- Constance Bergen as Nurse
- Ivan Miller as Doctor
- Chester Gan as Wong
- George Meader as Dr. Bruno
- Frank O'Connor as Detective
- John Dilson as Medical examiner
- Byron Foulger as Alienist (scene deleted just prior to release)
- Russell Hicks as Warden Harris

== Production ==
Theatrical poster for the re-titled and reissued The Atomic Monster.

Back in 1936, Boris Karloff was originally selected for the role of Dan McCormick, with Bela Lugosi playing Dr. Rigas. This earlier version of the film, which was titled The Electric Man, ended up being scrapped because the concept was too similar to another Karloff/Lugosi feature film, The Invisible Ray. The script was then shelved for the next four years before being revived in 1940 under Universal's new management.

When Man-Made Monster finally went into production, the studio considered it a quick, low-budget feature. Shot in three weeks and with an estimated budget of only $86,000, it was one of the cheapest films made by Universal that year. Despite these limitations, however, the filmmakers were still able to achieve some impressive effects, including one that made Lon Chaney appear to glow in the dark.

== Reception ==
Even though it was only a minor box office success, Man-Made Monster proved to be instrumental for Lon Chaney's career; his performance in the lead role helped him win a contract with Universal. While promoting their new star, Universal's publicity department hinted that history was possibly repeating itself, noting that Chaney's first major horror movie role was shot on the same set that was used for his father's well-known production of The Phantom of the Opera.

== Distribution ==
In the 1950s, Realart Pictures re-released the film, changing the title to The Atomic Monster in order to take advantage of the latest craze in science fiction and atomic age story lines. This new title, according to writer-producer Alex Gordon, was taken from a spec script he submitted to Realart which had the same name. He sent his attorney Samuel Z. Arkoff to meet the Realart representative James H. Nicholson to discuss the matter. The meeting netted Gordon a quick $1,000 settlement for copyright infringement, but more importantly, the meeting led Gordon, Arkoff, and Nicholson to form their own film company that eventually became American International Pictures. Man-Made Monster was released on Blu-ray by Scream Factory on June 16, 2020, as part of their Universal Horror Collection series. It features an informative audio commentary by Tom Weaver and Constantine Nasr.
