= Inner Sanctum Mystery =

Old-time American radio program with spinoffs

- An advertisement for Inner Sanctum
- Other names: Inner Sanctum
- Genre: Radio drama
- Running time: 24 minutes
- Country of origin: US
- Language: English
- Home station: Blue Network
- Hosted by: Raymond Edward Johnson, Paul McGrath
- Announcer: Ed Herlihy
- Created by: Himan Brown
- Directed by: Himan Brown
- Produced by: Himan Brown
- Original release: January 7, 1941 – October 5, 1952
- No. of episodes: 511 (List of episodes)
- Audio format: Monaural sound
- Sponsored by: Carter's Little Liver Pills, Lipton Tea

Inner Sanctum Mystery, also known as Inner Sanctum, is a popular old-time radio program that aired from January 7, 1941, to October 5, 1952. It was created by producer Himan Brown and was based on the imprint given to the mystery novels of Simon & Schuster. In all, 526 episodes were broadcast.

- See also

== Simon & Schuster series ==
In 1930, the first title was published in Simon & Schuster's "Inner Sanctum" mystery series: I Am Jonathan Scrivener by Claude Houghton. Although the imprint "Inner Sanctum" also included serious drama (published with blue covers) and romance (published with red covers), for the most part it was associated with mysteries (published in green covers). Lee Wright was the editor of the series, and over the years she introduced such authors as Craig Rice, Gypsy Rose Lee, Patrick Quentin, Thomas Sterling and Anthony Boucher.

== Horror hosts ==
On January 7, 1941, the Inner Sanctum radio program premiered, the name licensed by Simon & Schuster on condition that at the end of each broadcast the announcer would promote the latest book title published in the series. The anthology series featured stories of mystery, terror and suspense, and its tongue-in-cheek introductions were in sharp contrast to shows like Suspense and The Whistler. The early 1940s programs opened with Raymond Edward Johnson introducing himself as "Your host, Raymond" in a mockingly sardonic voice. A spooky melodramatic organ score (played by Lew White) punctuated Raymond's many morbid jokes and playful puns. Raymond's closing was an elongated "Pleasant dreeeeaams, hmmmmm?" His tongue-in-cheek style and ghoulish relish of his own tales became the standard for many such horror narrators to follow, such as Maurice Tarplin (on The Mysterious Traveler).

When Johnson left the series in May 1945 to serve in the Army, he was replaced by Paul McGrath, who did not keep the "Raymond" name and was known only as "Your Host" or "Mr. Host". (Berry Kroeger had substituted earlier for a total of four episodes.) McGrath was a Broadway actor who turned to radio for a regular income. Beginning in 1945, Lipton Tea sponsored the series, pairing first Raymond and then McGrath with cheery commercial spokeswoman Mary Bennett (aka the "Tea Lady"), whose blithesome pitches for Lipton Tea contrasted sharply with the macabre themes of the stories. She primly chided the host for his trademark dark humor and creepy manner.

== The creaking door ==
The program's familiar and famed audio trademark was the eerie creaking door which opened and closed the broadcasts. Himan Brown got the idea from a door in the basement that "squeaked like Hell." The door sound was actually made by a rusty desk chair. The program did originally intend to use a door, but on its first use, the door did not creak. Undaunted, Brown grabbed a nearby chair, sat in it and turned, causing a hair-raising squeak. The chair was used from then on as the sound prop. On at least one memorable occasion, a staffer innocently repaired and oiled the chair, thus forcing the sound man to mimic the squeak orally.

== Guest stars ==
The stories were effective little chillers, mixing horror and humor in equal doses. Memorable episodes included "Terror by Night" (September 18, 1945) and an adaptation of "The Tell-Tale Heart" (August 3, 1941). The latter starred Boris Karloff, who was heard regularly in the first season, starring in more than 15 episodes and returning sporadically thereafter.

Other established film stars who appeared on the program in the early years included Bela Lugosi, Mary Astor, Helen Hayes, Peter Lorre, Paul Lukas, Claude Rains, Frank Sinatra, and Orson Welles. Most of the lead and supporting players were stalwarts of New York radio. These included Santos Ortega, Larry Haines, Ted Osborne, Luis van Rooten, Stefan Schnabel, Ralph Bell, Mercedes McCambridge, Berry Kroeger, Arnold Moss, Leon Janney, Myron McCormick, and Mason Adams. Players like Richard Widmark, Everett Sloane, Burgess Meredith, Agnes Moorehead, Ken Lynch, and Anne Seymour also found fame or notability in film or television.

Of more than 500 programs broadcast, only about 200 remain in circulation.

== Example program opening ==
Sound effect: A door with squeaky hinges is slowly opened. Organ begins to play.

Raymond: Good evening, friends of the Inner Sanctum. This is Raymond, your host. I'm glad you came tonight, because we have a very special guest of horror with us. I'd like you to meet the late Johnny Gravestone, the most celebrated member of the Inner Sanctum Ghost Society. He's the best haunter of them all. Johnny's the tall figure in the white sheet wearing the blue ribbon. He's haunted everything from a palace to a telephone booth. And uh, if you're very nice to him, he'll be glad to consider giving your house the once-over. Who knows? He might even haunt you! Ha-ha-ha-ha!

(Commercial)

Raymond: Well, we're about to begin our story. Oh, I forgot to warn you about the Trembliens. They're those pesky, invisible cousins of the gremlins. They uh, sidle up to [sic] you, give quick little shoves, and give the false impression that you're trembling. If you're being troubled by a Tremblien, just grab him by his invisible little horns and stick him into the nearest pin cushion.

== Films ==

In June 1943, Universal purchased the screen rights to the series from Simon and Schuster, Inc. The Inner Sanctum Mysteries feature a "stream of consciousness" voiceover which Edward Dein stated he incorporated into his script at Lon Chaney Jr.'s insistence. With the exception of Pillow of Death, each film is prefaced with a sequence featuring the bobbing head of actor David Hoffman staring out of a crystal ball, giving warnings to the audience about how each audience member is capable of murder.

Lon Chaney Jr. was hopeful for the series, craving diversity in his roles after Universal had placed him in various monster roles in their horror films. Pivar planned to produce two Inner Sanctum mystery films a year with each film featuring Chaney and Gale Sondergaard in the lead roles. Sondergaard was dropped from the lead role shortly before the filming of Calling Dr. Death.

The films in the series are Calling Dr. Death (1943), Weird Woman (1944), Dead Man's Eyes (1944), The Frozen Ghost (1945), Strange Confession (1945) and Pillow of Death (1945).

From retrospective reviews, Kim Newman described the film series as "straddling whodunnit and horror" and that "the films vary in quality but mostly deliver as strange entertainment." Newman found that Weird Woman was the standout film in the Inner Sanctum series, being the sole entry in the series to have supernatural elements. The authors of the book Universal Horrors declared the series "feeble melodramas with little to recommend them beyond their camp qualities and the morose spectacle of seeing a badly miscast Chaney struggle his way through acting assignments that were painfully beyond his depth." They concluded that the series was "generally regarded by buffs and film historians as a missed cinematic opportunity."

== Television ==
The 1954 syndicated television series featured Paul McGrath as the off-camera host/narrator. The TV shows were produced at the Himan Brown Production Center (now Chelsea Studios) in Manhattan.

== "Pleasant dreeeeaaams, hmmmmm?" ==
In the 1970s, with his CBS Radio Mystery Theater series, Himan Brown recycled both the creaking door opening and, to a lesser extent, the manner of Raymond. The hosts were E. G. Marshall and during the final season, Tammy Grimes. When the series was rebroadcast during the late 1990s, Brown himself rerecorded the host segments and mimicked Raymond's "Pleasant dreeeeaaams, hmmmmm?" for the familiar closing.

== Satires ==
Harvey Kurtzman and Will Elder satirized the series in Mad's fifth issue (June–July 1953) with "Outer Sanctum!" In the opening panels, host Ramon greets the reader: "Come in, I've been waiting for you! I've been waiting for you to fix my squeaking door!... What?... You say you're not the carpenter?... You have come to hear a story?... Very well!"

In the Three Stooges short The Ghost Talks, a creaking door prompts Shemp to parody the opening narration of the program, naming it "The Outer Sanctorum."

The opening of an Inner Sanctum episode was used to open one side of The Whole Burbank Catalog, a 1972 compilation album in the Warner/Reprise Loss Leaders series from Warner Bros. Records. The announcer's jokey pun in this case concerned an author friend, specializing in best-sellers, who "tried to bury [him] in one, because all the very best sellers (cellars) have corpses in them." A backwards version of the creaking door sound effect led directly into "Get It On" by T. Rex.

The popular British 60s radio comedy Round The Horne had occasional sketches that were influenced by the style of the show. Regular cast member Hugh Paddick would introduce the "scary" sketch with the words "Inner Sanctum-um-um-um-um-um..." – pretending to echo! This was accompanied by a warbling, quivering, high pitched tone from a Theremin played by an orchestra member. The sketches nearly always ended in confusion as the plots were deliberately circular and convoluted whilst playing up the "spookiness" of the part.

The 1946 Warner Brothers Bugs Bunny cartoon Racketeer Rabbit had Bugs enter an abandoned Victorian house (which was actually the gangsters' hideout) that had a squeaky door. Bugs said as he was entering the house, "Huh? Sounds like Inner Sanctum!"

== See also ==
- List of Inner Sanctum episodes
