= The Frozen Ghost =

1945 film by Harold Young

- Theatrical release poster
- Directed by: Harold Young
- Screenplay by: Bernard Schubert; Luci Ward
- Story by: Harrison Carter; Henry Sucher
- Based on: Inner Sanctum Mystery by Himan Brown
- Produced by: Will Cowan
- Starring: Lon Chaney Jr.; Evelyn Ankers; Elena Verdugo
- Cinematography: Paul Ivano
- Edited by: Fred R. Feitshans Jr.
- Music by: Richard Hageman; William Lava; Hans J. Salter; Paul Sawtell; Frank Skinner
- Production company: Universal Pictures
- Distributed by: Universal Pictures
- Release date: June 1, 1945 (United States)
- Running time: 61 minutes
- Country: United States
- Language: English

The Frozen Ghost is a 1945 American noir-mystery film and the fourth installment in The Inner Sanctum Mysteries anthological film series, which was based on the popular radio series of the same name. The movie stars Lon Chaney Jr., Elena Verdugo, Evelyn Ankers, Tala Birell, and Martin Kosleck, and was directed by Harold Young.

== Plot ==
Alex Gregor (Chaney) is a performing mentalist known as "Gregor the Great". One night on stage, placing his own fiancée into a hypnotic trance, he is ridiculed by a skeptical member of the audience (Hohl), who claims it is all done with mirrors. Simultaneously, the show is aired to a radio audience. The man, clearly plastered, starts accusing Alex of being a fake. Alex reacts by hypnotizing the man, ending up accidentally killing him. Even though the medical examiner concludes that the drunken man died from a heart attack, Alex is riddled with guilt and confesses to have murdered the man. Ashamed of what he has done, he breaks off the engagement to his girlfriend and assistant, Maura Daniel (Ankers).

George Keene (Milburn Stone), who is Alex's manager, arranges for him to work for an old friend, Madame Valerie Monet (Tala Birell). She is the owner of a wax museum and Alex is hired as a lecturer. Valerie's niece, Nina Coudreau (Elena Verdugo), is also working at the museum, and they are both very excited to have a man with Alex's gifts working with them. There is also a disturbed former plastic surgeon Rudi Poldan (Martin Kosleck), on the payroll, working as a sculptor. This odd physician becomes jealous of the attention given to Alex. Maura reappears and attempts to woo Gregor back.

Jealousy spreads, infecting Valerie, who falsely accuses Alex of making advances to Nina, her niece. Arguments ensue, ending with Valerie fainting and Alex leaving in anger. Following a night's sleep, Alex returns to find that Valerie has disappeared. Police Inspector Brant (Douglass Dumbrille) suspects that Valerie has been murdered, believing Alex to be the last person to have seen Valerie alive.

All are unaware that Rudi has found Valerie in a coma and hidden her away among his unfinished wax sculptures. Nina suspects Alex of scheming with the crazy surgeon to be rid of Valerie. What they don't know is that Rudi has planned to get Alex committed as mentally ill, and the mastermind of this ingenious plan is none other than Alex's manager, George. The reason is to gain control over Alex's property. Rudi manages to make Nina fall into a coma and hides her body in the same manner as was done with Valerie.

Rudi shows George where he has placed the bodies of the two women. They discover that Valerie is dead. Now guilty of murder, George becomes frantic, wanting to get rid of both of the bodies, even though Nina is still alive.

Alex decides the only person he can trust is Maura, who agrees to help. Alex places Maura in a trance and she implicates both George and Rudi (using the psychic abilities granted to her by the trance, as demonstrated in the opening scene of the film). Trying to escape, George is captured by Brant, who has heard Maura's every word. Alex and Maura go to the museum cellar to free Nina and encounter Rudi. In the ensuing struggle with Gregor, Rudi falls backward into the furnace to his death.

The story ends with Alex and Maura married and on their way to their honeymoon, together with Nina, their new ward. Brant visits and asks Alex for help with a case, as a medical consultant. Alex answers: "Oh, Inspector, I thought you knew. It's all done with mirrors."

== Cast ==
- Lon Chaney Jr. as Alex Gregor / Gregor the Great
- Evelyn Ankers as Maura Daniel
- Elena Verdugo as Nina Coudreau
- Martin Kosleck as Dr. Rudi Polden
- Tala Birell as Valerie Monet
- Milburn Stone as George Keene
- Douglass Dumbrille as Inspector Brant
- Arthur Hohl as Skeptic
- Eddie Acuff as Reporter in Hallway (uncredited)
- Polly Bailey as Older Lady in Audience (uncredited)
- Bobby Barber as Bald Man (uncredited)
- Eddie Bruce as Man in Audience (uncredited)
- Jan Bryant as Teenage Girl in Audience (uncredited)
- Pauline Drake as Mabel, the Drunk's date (uncredited)
- Helena Phillips Evans as Woman in Audience (uncredited)
- William Haade as Policeman on Dock (uncredited)
- Leyland Hodgson as Doctor (uncredited)
- David Hoffman as The Spirit of the Inner Sanctum (uncredited)
- Charles Jordan as Reporter in Hallway (uncredited)
- Carl M. Leviness as Man in Audience (uncredited)
- Wilbur Mack as Man in Audience (uncredited)
- Thomas Martin as Man in Audience (uncredited)
- Dennis Moore as Radio Show Announcer (uncredited)
- Bud Wolfe as Cab Driver (uncredited)
