= Dead Man's Eyes =

1944 film by Reginald LeBorg

- Theatrical release poster
- Directed by: Reginald LeBorg
- Written by: Dwight V. Babcock
- Based on: Inner Sanctum Mystery by Himan Brown
- Produced by: Ben Pivar; Will Cowan
- Starring: Lon Chaney Jr.; Acquanetta; Jean Parker
- Cinematography: Paul Ivano
- Edited by: Milton Carruth
- Music by: Paul Sawtell
- Production company: Universal Pictures
- Distributed by: Universal Pictures
- Release date: 1944
- Running time: 64 minutes
- Country: United States
- Language: English

Dead Man's Eyes is a 1944 American noir-mystery film, and the third installment in The Inner Sanctum Mysteries anthological film series, which was based on the popular radio series of the same name. Directed by Reginald LeBorg, and starring Lon Chaney Jr. and Jean Parker, the movie was distributed by Universal Pictures.

== Plot ==
Painter Dave Stuart is blinded by his jealous model, Tanya, who says she mistakenly switched Dave's eyewash with acid. 'Dad' Hayden, father of his fiancé Heather, offers an operation to restore his sight, but Stuart will have to wait until 'Dad' Hayden dies. The benefactor dies a premature death and Stuart becomes a suspect.

Dave tells Heather he no longer loves her and wishes to break their engagement because he considers his blindness a burden to her. Tanya volunteers to be Dave's caregiver as she has secretly been in love with him and sees his handicap as an opportunity to have him to herself.

Even though Dave is accused of killing 'Dad' Hayden, doctors transplant Hayden's corneas into Dave, since it was Dad's wish that his eyes go to Dave after his death. Before the operation can be performed, Tanya steals the corneas thinking that Dave will never return to Heather if he remains blind. Dr. Alan Bittaker suspects that Tanya is the person who took the corneas and confronts her. Tanya admits she took the corneas so that she could continue to care for Dave, but that she doesn't really want him to remain blind. Dr. Bittaker takes the eyes to the hospital and the transplant is performed. At first, the transplant seems to be a failure as Dave continues to be blind.

Heather suspects her other suitor, Nick, of being her father's killer though Nick vehemently denies it. Dave begins to suspect his former model Tanya of the killing, after initially defending her, and has her followed.

Tanya calls Heather saying she knows who the killer might be, but before she can tell her she is murdered by an unknown assailant. The police chief, who still suspects Dave of murdering Dad Hayden, confronts Dave about Tanya's death. The chief believes that Dave may secretly be able to see and tries to trick him into revealing it.

Dave returns to the scene of Dad Hayden's killing looking for clues. He is attacked by a mysterious man but manages to fight him off and escape. Heather enters the room after Dave runs out and the attacker is revealed to be Nick who accuses Dave of the killings.

Dave asks Dr. Alan Bittaker to come to his apartment and tells him that he knows he is the killer of both Dad Hayden and Tanya. Dave tells him that Alan killed Hayden so that Dave would regain his sight and return to Heather so that Alan could marry Tanya, as he had been in love with her. When Tanya realized Alan was the murderer, Bittaker killed her to save himself from the gas chamber.

After Alan admits his guilt to Dave he tries killing him with his cane, the same cane Alan used to kill Hayden and Tanya. As Alan swings his cane at Dave's head, Dave jumps up and stops him, revealing that his sight had indeed returned. The police then storm in, having heard Alan's confession, and arrest him. Heather enters the room and falls into Dave's arms and they profess that they still love each other as Alan is led away.

== Cast ==
- Lon Chaney Jr. as David 'Dave' Stuart (as Lon Chaney)
- Acquanetta as Tanya Czoraki
- Jean Parker as Heather 'Brat' Hayden
- Paul Kelly as Dr. Alan Bittaker
- Thomas Gomez as Capt. Drury
- Jonathan Hale as Dr. Sam Welles
- Edward Fielding as Dr. Stanley 'Dad' Hayden
- George Meeker as Nick Phillips
- Pierre Watkin as The Lawyer

== See also ==
- List of American films of 1944
