= Weird Woman =

1944 film by Reginald LeBorg

- Theatrical poster
- Directed by: Reginald LeBorg
- Screenplay by: Brenda Weisberg
- Story by: W. Scott Darling
- Based on: Conjure Wife by Fritz Leiber
- Produced by: Ben Pivar; Oliver Drake
- Starring: Lon Chaney Jr.; Anne Gwynne; Evelyn Ankers
- Cinematography: Virgil Miller
- Edited by: Milton Carruth
- Music by: Paul Sawtell
- Production company: Universal Pictures
- Distributed by: Universal Pictures
- Release date: March 1, 1944 (United States)
- Running time: 63 minutes
- Country: United States
- Language: English

Weird Woman is a 1944 noir-mystery horror film, and the second installment in The Inner Sanctum Mysteries anthological film series, which was based on the popular radio series of the same name. Directed by Reginald LeBorg and starring Lon Chaney Jr., Anne Gwynne, and Evelyn Ankers. The movie is one of several films based on the novel Conjure Wife by Fritz Leiber. Co-star Evelyn Ankers had previously worked with Chaney in Ghost of Frankenstein, where Chaney played the Frankenstein monster, and The Wolf Man, where Chaney played the title role.

== Plot ==
Professor Norman Reed falls in love with and marries a woman named Paula during their vacation in the South Seas. Upon returning to his hometown, she is met with a cool reception by much of the community, particularly Ilona, who had believed Reed was destined for her. Bizarre incidents begin to occur, including the death of a colleague, which further alienates Paula, especially given her beliefs in voodoo and other supernatural phenomena. Reed must work diligently to prove Paula's innocence and uncover the true perpetrator behind these strange events.

== Cast ==
- Lon Chaney Jr. as Prof. Norman Reed (billed as Lon Chaney)
- Anne Gwynne as Paula Clayton Reed
- Evelyn Ankers as Ilona Carr
- Ralph Morgan as Prof. Millard Sawtelle
- Elisabeth Risdon as Dean of Women Grace Gunnison
- Lois Collier as Margret Mercer
- Harry Hayden as Dean Septimus Carr
- Elizabeth Russell as Evelyn Sawtelle
- Phil Brown as David Jennings
- Kay Harding as Student (billed as Jackie Lou Harding)

== Cast notes ==
Evelyn Ankers: Ankers recalled shortly before her death in 1985, that she was uncomfortable with the role of sinister Liona for both professional and personal reasons. Ankers, a strikingly attractive blonde, was customarily cast in "good-girl" ingénue roles in many of her program pictures. Disappointed in her own performance, she felt she was miscast. When LeBorg would say "action" and Ankers would try to exact a menacing look, she and co-star Anne Gwynne would almost inevitably start laughing. Universal never hired her to play a villain again. In addition, she and Anne Gwynne, who plays her nemesis, Paula, were best friends off-screen, contradicting their on-screen personas. Film historian Wheeler W. Dixon reports that Anker's characterization of the scheming Liona was "entirely convincing" and commensurate with the "uniformly excellent" supporting cast.

Lon Chaney Jr.: Chaney, who audiences identified with Universal's The Wolf Man and The Mummy's Ghost "is a trifle hard to accept as an intellectual" in a university Sociology department setting. Film critic Ken Hanke writes: "[Q]uite the scariest thing about Weird Woman may be the idea of Chaney as a brilliant professor of anthropology. That's also what makes it fun."

== Production ==
Director Reginald LeBorg recalls being given the script on a Friday and being told to begin shooting a week from Monday; the cast was filled out shortly before filming. This rushed production schedule was the norm at Universal. The budget restraints placed by Universal on their "B" units were such that director LaBorg felt compelled to apply lighting techniques to obscure the "drab, pre-fab sets that he was obliged to use." Inner Sanctum films, as a rule, cost approximately $150,000 to produce, and shooting schedules were routinely 12 days.

== Reception ==
New York Times reviewer "B. C." dismissed Weird Woman as a "weird" production released "in a fit of desperation" by Universal Pictures. Offering a thumbnail sketch of the film narrative, the reviewer concludes: "Weird, isn't it? And, boy, is it dull!"

== Retrospective appraisal ==
As in most of director LeBorg's cinematic endeavors for Universal's low-budget production unit, he "makes the most of the limited sets and day players he was forced to use by management." Film historian Wheeler W. Dixon judges that, despite these limitations, "the film holds up extremely well."

Film critic Ken Hanke writes: "Overall, director Reginald LeBorg keeps Weird Woman pretty effective on the atmosphere front...This was only LeBorg's third feature and you can tell that he was seriously trying to prove himself."
