= Harold Young (filmmaker) =

American film director and film editor (1897–1972)

- Born: November 13, 1897; Portland, Oregon, U.S.
- Died: March 3, 1972 (aged 74); Beverly Hills, California, U.S.
- Education: Columbia University
- Occupations: Film director; film editor; actor

Harold Young (November 13, 1897 – March 3, 1972) was an American film director, editor, and occasional actor.

== Career ==
Young was born in 1897 in Portland, Oregon, where he was raised and attended high school.

After graduating from Columbia University, Young began his career as a film editor from 1923 to 1934, working first on a series of George O'Hara short subjects under the director Malcolm St. Clair.

Young's best-known early directorial assignment is probably The Scarlet Pimpernel (1934), starring Leslie Howard and Merle Oberon, one example of his occasional work in Britain.

He died on March 3, 1972, in Beverly Hills, California.

== Filmography ==
As editor:

- Sally, Irene and Mary (1925)
- The Strong Man (1926)
- Sin Cargo (1926)
- The Private Life of Helen of Troy (1927)
- Yellow Lily (1928)
- The Painted Angel (1929)
- Her Private Life (1929)
- Bright Lights (1930)
- Top Speed (1930)
- The Lash (1930)
- Counsel's Opinion (1933)
- The Rise of Catherine the Great (1934)

As director:

- The Scarlet Pimpernel (1934)
- Too Many Millions (1934)
- Leave It to Blanche (1934)
- Without Regret (1935)
- 52nd Street (1937)
- Let Them Live (1937)
- Newsboys' Home (1938)
- Little Tough Guy (1938)
- Sabotage (1939)
- Dreaming Out Loud (1940)
- Juke Box Jenny (1942)
- There's One Born Every Minute (1942)
- The Mummy's Tomb (1942)
- Rubber Racketeers (1942)
- Hi'ya, Chum (1943)
- Machine Gun Mama (1944)
- The Three Caballeros (1944) (segment)
- The Frozen Ghost (1945)
- Song of the Sarong (1945)
- The Jungle Captive (1945)
- Roogie's Bump (1954)
- Carib Gold (1956)
