= Richard Denning =

American actor (1914–1998)

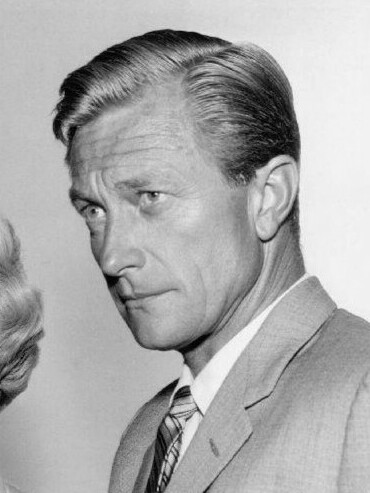
- Denning as Michael Shayne
- Born: Louis Albert Heindrich Denninger Jr. March 27, 1914; Poughkeepsie, New York, U.S.
- Died: October 11, 1998 (aged 84); Escondido, California, U.S.
- Resting place: Makawao Veterans' Cemetery
- Education: Woodbury Business College (MBA)
- Occupation: Actor
- Years active: 1937–1980
- Spouses: Evelyn Ankers (m. 1942; died 1985) Patricia Leffingwell (m. 1986)
- Children: 1

Richard Denning (born Louis Albert Heindrich Denninger Jr.; March 27, 1914 – October 11, 1998) was an American actor who starred in science-fiction films of the 1950s, including Unknown Island (1948), Creature from the Black Lagoon (1954), Target Earth (1954), Day the World Ended (1955), Creature with the Atom Brain (1955), and The Black Scorpion (1957). Denning also appeared in the film An Affair to Remember (1957) with Cary Grant and on radio with Lucille Ball in My Favorite Husband (1948–1951), the forerunner of I Love Lucy. He is better known as Governor Paul Jameson in late 1968-1980 police procedural TV series Hawaii Five-O.

== Early years ==
Denning was born in Poughkeepsie, New York. When he was 18 months old, his family moved to Los Angeles. After attending Manual Arts High School, he earned a master of business administration degree from Woodbury Business College in Los Angeles. Plans called for him to take over his father's garment-manufacturing business, but he developed an interest in acting. Denning enlisted in the U.S. Navy during World War II and served on submarines.

== Career ==
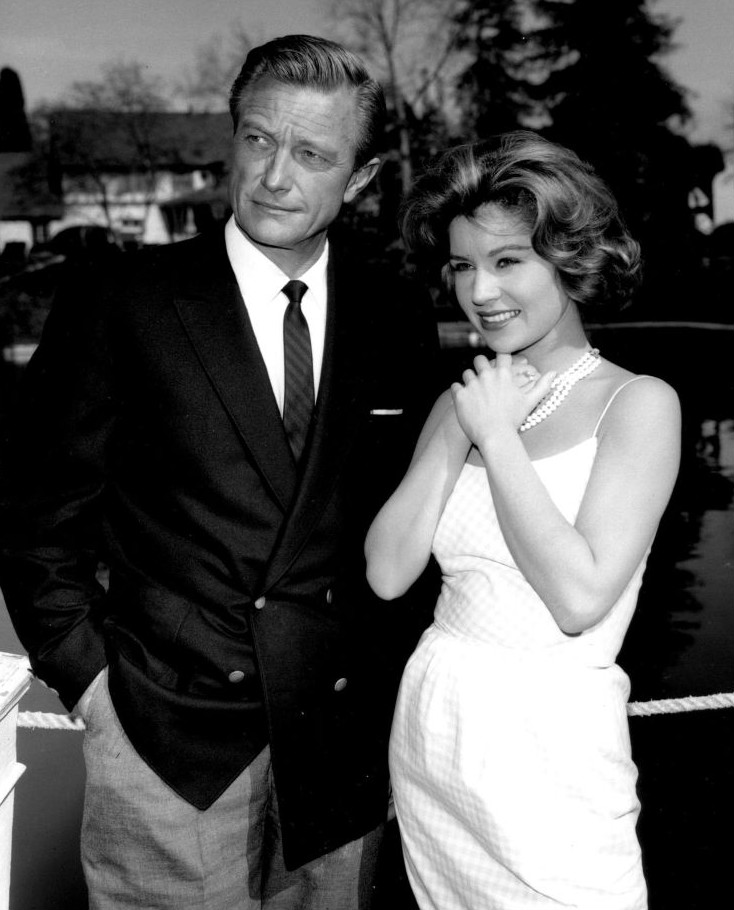
With Pat Crowley in an episode of Michael Shayne (1961)

Denning was perhaps best known for his recurring starring roles in science-fiction and horror films of the 1950s, and playing husband opposite Lucille Ball on the radio series that led to I Love Lucy in which he was replaced by Desi Arnaz as Lucy's husband.

Denning began acting in minor supporting and background roles through the 1930s and early 1940s until the start of World War II. According to Denning, his military service disrupted his acting career, and after his discharge, Paramount Pictures took a year and a half before offered him more acting work. During that time, his family and he lived in a mobile home that he alternately parked at Malibu and Palm Springs.

Denning's unemployment ended when he was hired to star on the radio opposite Lucille Ball in My Favorite Husband. The CBS Radio sitcom ran for 124 episodes from July 23, 1948, through March 31, 1951, and evolved into the groundbreaking television sitcom I Love Lucy. CBS wanted Denning to continue as the husband in the new sitcom, but Lucille Ball insisted that her real-life husband, Desi Arnaz, play the part. The radio stint, however, led to a role on CBS television's series adaptation of Mr. and Mrs. North.

On television, he starred as the title character in the 1950 syndicated adventure series Ding Howe and the Flying Tigers. He was cast as Dr. Greg Graham in the 1959 series, The Flying Doctor. He also starred as the title character in the detective series Michael Shayne (1960–1961) and shared title billing with Barbara Britton in the detective series Mr. and Mrs. North (1952–1954).

In 1964-1965, Denning played Steve Scott in the comedy series Karen. In later life, he had a recurring role as the fictitious governor of Hawaii, Paul Jameson, in the CBS television crime drama series, Hawaii Five-O (1968–1980), starring Jack Lord.

He appeared three times on the ABC religion anthology series Crossroads, as Dr. Ira Langston in "Chinese Checkers" (1955), as the Reverend George Bolton in "The Bowery Bishop", and as the Reverend Lloyd E. Williams in "The Pure White Orchid" (both 1956).

In other activity on radio, Denning played Uncle Jack in It's a Crime, Mr. Collins (1956-1957) on the Mutual Broadcasting System. He also was the second actor to play Jerry North in the radio version of Mr. and Mrs. North.

Denning later appeared in several crime drama B films before starring in science-fiction and horror films.

In 1968, Denning completed his last film, a comedy titled I Sailed to Tahiti with an All Girl Crew. Semiretired and living on the island of Maui with his wife, Denning was contacted by producer Leonard Freeman, who offered him the supporting role as the governor of Hawaii in the TV detective series, Hawaii Five-O. To persuade Denning to sign on in the recurring role, Freeman guaranteed Denning five-hour days and a four-day work week.

== Recognition ==
Denning has a star at 6932 Hollywood Boulevard in the Television section of the Hollywood Walk of Fame. It was dedicated on February 8, 1960.

== Personal life and death ==
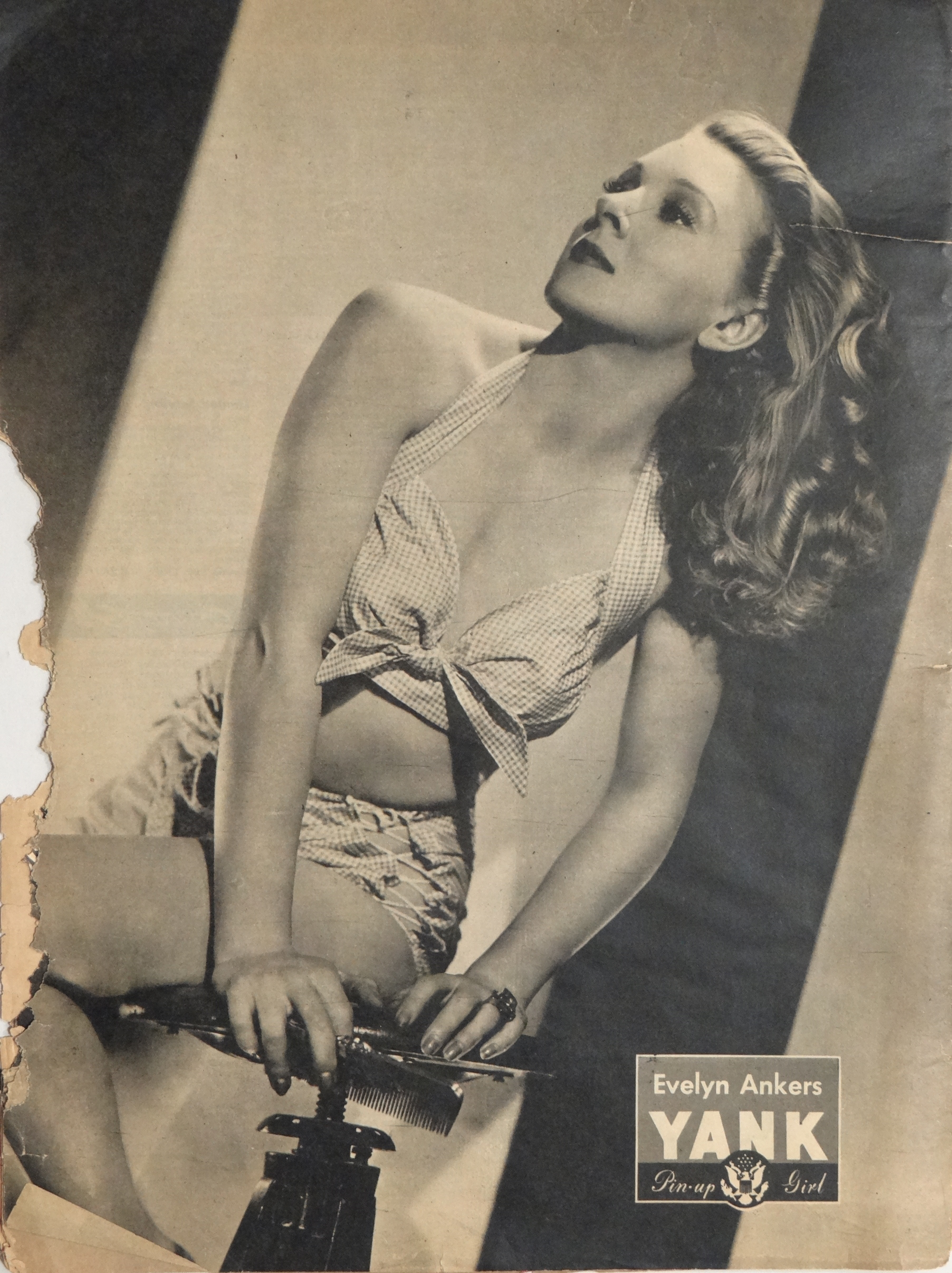
Evelyn Ankers, Denning's wife, in 1945 Yank Army magazine pin-up

In 1942, Denning married 1940s horror film queen Evelyn Ankers (co-star of The Wolf Man, Ghost of Frankenstein, and Son of Dracula), who retired from films at the age of 32 after they were married. Ankers and he had a daughter, Diana Denning (later Dwyer). After Ankers's death from cancer in 1985, he married Patricia Leffingwell. Denning died at Palomar Medical Center in Escondido on October 11, 1998, from complications of emphysema. Denning and Ankers are buried at Makawao Veterans' Cemetery in Makawao, Hawaii.

== Filmography ==
Film and television
Year	Title	Role	Notes
1937	Hold 'em Navy	Midshipman Jepson	
1937	Night Club Scandal	Vera's Naval Fiancé	(scenes deleted)
1937	Wells Fargo	Minor Role	Uncredited
1938	The Buccaneer	Captain Reid	
1938	The Big Broadcast of 1938	Officer, S.S. Gigantic	Uncredited
1938	Her Jungle Love	Pilot	Uncredited
1938	College Swing	Student	Uncredited
1938	You and Me	Salesman	
1938	The Texans	Cpl. Parker	Uncredited
1938	Give Me a Sailor	Sailor	Uncredited
1938	Campus Confessions	Buck Hogan	
1938	King of Alcatraz	Harry Vay	
1938	Touchdown, Army	Cadet	Uncredited
1938	The Arkansas Traveler	Bit Role	Uncredited
1938	Illegal Traffic	Silk Patterson	
1938	Say It in French	Elevator Passenger	Uncredited
1939	Ambush	Police Garage Mechanic	
1939	Persons in Hiding	Powder, Henchman	
1939	King of Chinatown	Protective Association Henchman	
1939	I'm from Missouri	Plane Pilot	Uncredited
1939	Sudden Money	Johnny Jordan	
1939	Hotel Imperial		Uncredited
1939	Union Pacific	Reporter	Uncredited
1939	Some Like It Hot	Mr. Weems	
1939	Undercover Doctor	Frank Oliver	
1939	The Gracie Allen Murder Case	Fred	
1939	Grand Jury Secrets	Murph	
1939	Million Dollar Legs	Hunk Jordan	
1939	The Star Maker	Assistant Dance Director	
1939	Television Spy	Dick Randolph	
1939	Disputed Passage	Student	Uncredited
1939	Our Neighbors – The Carters	Pilot	Uncredited
1939	Geronimo	Lt. Larned	Uncredited
1939	The Night of Nights	Call Boy	Uncredited
1940	Emergency Squad	Dan Barton	
1940	Parole Fixer	Bruce Eaton	
1940	The Farmer's Daughter	Dennis Crane	
1940	Seventeen	Jack	
1940	Those Were the Days!	Briggs	
1940	Queen of the Mob	Charlie Webster	
1940	Golden Gloves	Bill Crane	
1940	Northwest Mounted Police	Const. Thornton	
1940	Love Thy Neighbor	Joe	
1941	Adam Had Four Sons	Jack Stoddard (older)	
1941	West Point Widow	Lt. Rhody Graves	
1942	Beyond the Blue Horizon	Jackra the Magnificent	
1942	The Glass Key	Taylor Henry	
1942	Quiet Please, Murder	Hal McByrne	
1942	Ice-Capades Revue	Jeff Stewart	
1944	Golden Gloves		
1946	Black Beauty	Bill Dixon	
1946	The Fabulous Suzanne	Rex	
1947	Seven Were Saved	Captain Allen Danton	
1948	Caged Fury	Blaney Lewis	
1948	Lady at Midnight	Peter Wiggins	
1948	Unknown Island	John Fairbanks	
1948	Disaster	Bill Wyatt	
1950	No Man of Her Own	Hugh Harkness	
1950	Harbor of Missing Men	Jim 'Brooklyn' Gannon	
1950	Double Deal	Buzz Doyle	
1951	The Bigelow Theatre		TV series, episode: "The Hot Welcome"
1951	Flame of Stamboul	Larry Wilson	
1951	Insurance Investigator	Tom Davison	
1951	Secrets of Beauty	Dr. John Waldron	
1951	Week-End with Father	Don Adams	
1952	Okinawa	Lt. Phillips	
1952	Scarlet Angel	Malcolm Bradley	
1952 - 1953	Mr. and Mrs. North	Jerry North	TV series on CBS, 56 episodes total; later with NBC
1952	Cavalcade of America		TV series episode: "The Man Who Took a Chance"
1952	Hangman's Knot	Lee Kemper	
1953	Target Hong Kong	Mike Lassiter	
1953	Ford Television Theatre	Dr. James Baker	TV series, episode: "The Doctor's Downfall"
1953	The 49th Man	Chief Investigator Paul Reagan	
1953	The Glass Web	Dave Markson	
1954	Jivaro	Jerry Russell	
1954	Ford Television Theatre	George Beagle	TV series, episode: "The Legal Beagles"
1954	Creature from the Black Lagoon	Dr. Mark Williams	
1954	Battle of Rogue River	Stacey Wyatt	
1954	Schlitz Playhouse of Stars		TV series, episode: "Tapu"
1954	Mr. and Mrs. North	Jerry North	TV series on NBC, 56 episodes total (both networks)
1954	Target Earth	Frank Brooks	
1955	TV Reader's Digest	Don Wilkerson	TV series, episode: "I'll Pick More Daisies"
1955	Ford Television Theatre	Tim Barker	TV series, episode: "All That Glitters"
1955	Air Strike	Cmdr. Stanley Blair	
1955	The Magnificent Matador	Mark Russell	
1955	Creature with the Atom Brain	Dr. Chet Walker	
1955	The Gun That Won the West	'Dakota' Jack Gaines	
1955	The Crooked Web	Frank Daniel	
1955	Day the World Ended	Rick	
1956	Cheyenne	Capt. Quinlan	TV series, episode: "Decision"
1956	Celebrity Playhouse	William Broder	TV series, episode: "Bachelor Husband"
1956	The Oklahoma Woman	Steve Ward	
1956	Girls in Prison	Rev. Fulton	
1956	Crossroads	Dr. Ira Langston	TV series, episode: "Chinese Checkers"
1956	Crossroads	Rev. George Bolton	TV series, episode: "The Bowery Bishop"
1956	Crossroads	Reverend Lloyd E. Williams	TV series, episode: "The Pure White Orchid"
1956	Assignment Redhead	Major Gregory Keen	
1956	Ford Television Theatre	Barney Maddock	TV series, episode: "Double Trouble
1956	Ford Television Theatre	Davy Jones	TV series, episode: "On the Beach"
1957	Naked Paradise	Duke Bradley	
1957	Ford Television Theatre	Charlie Frye	TV series, episode: "The Idea Man"
1957	The Buckskin Lady	Dr. Bruce Merritt	
1957	An Affair to Remember	Kenneth Bradley	
1957	The Black Scorpion	Hank Scott	
1957	General Electric Theater	Dr. Mark Andrews	TV series, episode: "Eyes of a Stranger"
1958	General Electric Theater	Jim Kendall	TV series, episode: "Letters from Cairo"
1958	The Lady Takes a Flyer	Al Reynolds	
1958	Studio One	Jack Marshall	TV series, episode: "The Laughing Willow"
1958	Desert Hell	Sgt. Major Pierre Benet	
1959	The Flying Doctor	Dr. Greg Graham	TV series, 39 episodes
1960	No Greater Love		
1960–1961	Michael Shayne	Michael Shayne	TV series, 32 episodes
1963	Going My Way	Larry	TV series, episode: "Don't Forget to Say Goodbye"
1963	Twice-Told Tales	Jonathan Maulle	
1964–1965	Karen	Steve Scott	TV series, 27 episodes
1966	Alice Through the Looking Glass	Alice's Father	
1968	I Sailed to Tahiti With an All Girl Crew	Commodore	
1968	I Spy	Delaney	TV series, episode: "This Guy Smith"
1968–1980	Hawaii Five-O	Governor Paul Jameson	TV series, 69 episodes
1974	McCloud	Edgar Hamilton	TV series, episode: "A Cowboy in Paradise"
1980	The Asphalt Cowboy	Charles Van Heuran	(final film role)
