= Charles Jarvis =

Charles Jarvis may refer to:

- Charles Jervas (1675–1739), sometimes known as Charles Jarvis, Irish portrait painter
- Charles Jarvis (cricketer) (1792–1855), English cricketer
- Charles William Jarvis (1866–1932), Canadian banker and politician
- Charles Jarvis (VC) (1881–1948), Scottish recipient of the Victoria Cross
- Charles Jarvis (businessman) (fl. 1980s–2000s), American businessman and politician
