= The Mad Ghoul =

1943 film by James P. Hogan

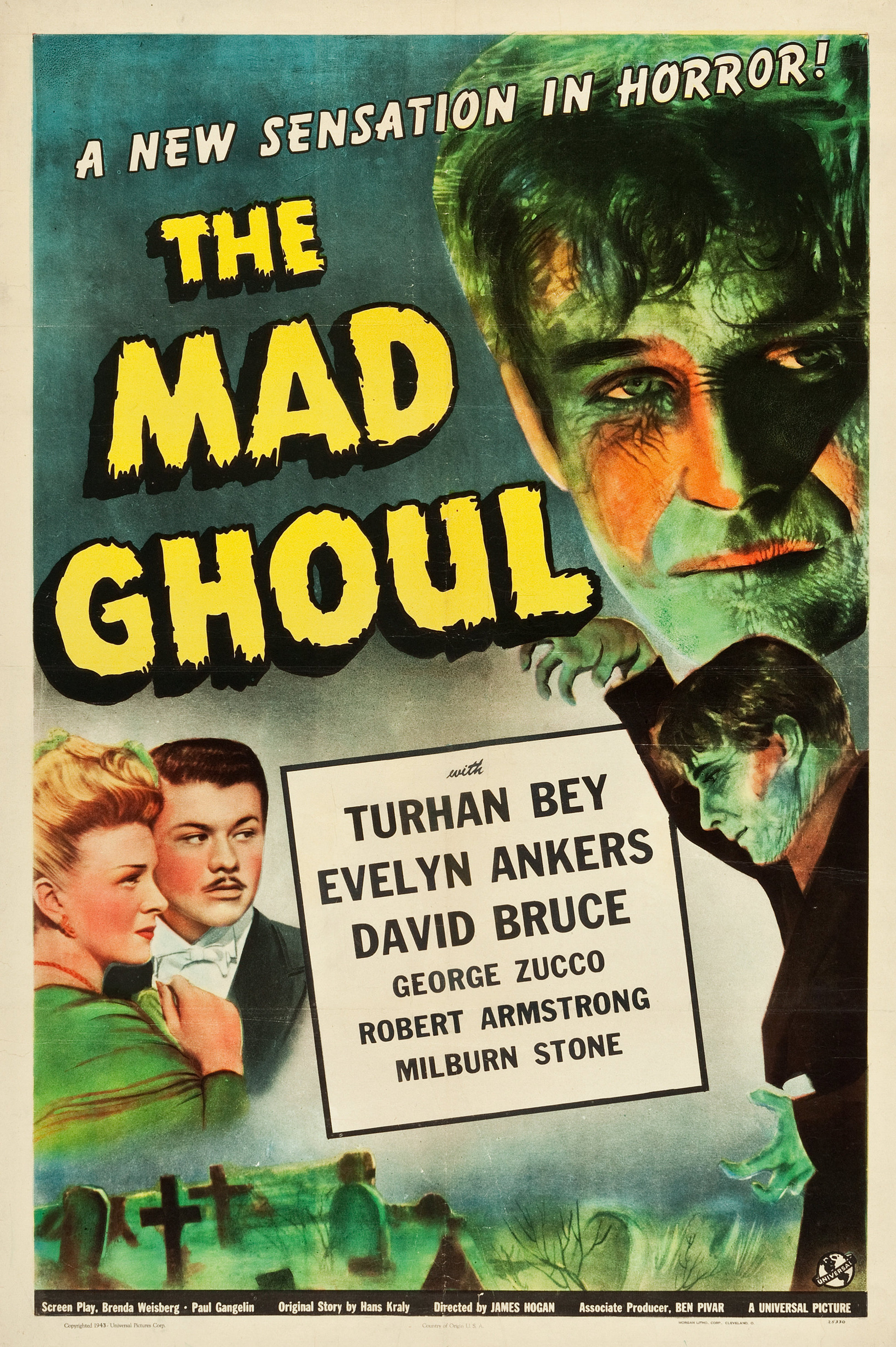
- Film poster
- Directed by: James Hogan
- Screenplay by: Paul Gangelin; Brenda Weisberg
- Story by: Hans Kraly
- Starring: Turhan Bey; Evelyn Ankers; David Bruce; George Zucco; Robert Armstrong; Milburn Stone
- Cinematography: Milton Krasner
- Edited by: Milton Carruth
- Production company: Universal Pictures Company, Inc.
- Distributed by: Universal Pictures Company, Inc.
- Release date: 12 November 1943
- Running time: 65 minutes
- Country: United States
- Language: English

The Mad Ghoul is a 1943 American horror film directed by James Hogan and starring Turhan Bey, Evelyn Ankers, and David Bruce, and featuring George Zucco, Robert Armstrong, and Milburn Stone. The film is about the scientist Dr. Alfred Morris and his assistant Ted Allison. Morris, who is obsessed with an ancient Mayan life-preserving process to the point of madness, has fallen in love with Allison's girlfriend, the concert singer Isabel Lewis. Morris decides to use Allison for his eternal-life experiments, transforming him into a zombie who slowly recalls his past life, but is unaware of his undead status.

The Mad Ghoul was developed at Universal Pictures in February 1943 under the title The Mystery of the Mad Ghoul. Filming was completed in May for a release on November 12 the same year.

== Plot ==
Dr. Alfred Morris is curious about the effects of an ancient nerve gas, used by the Mayans during rituals of human dissection to appease their gods. He takes medical student Ted Allison under his wing to assist him with his experiments in using the gas on modern animals. Despite Ted's enthusiasm for the success of their effort to revive Morris's dead monkey Jocko (who was earlier exposed to the gas and died), by using a fluid from the heart of another creature, Ted also has on his mind his girlfriend Isabel Lewis, of whom Morris has also become enamored.

Later, on the night of the duo's first experiment, Ted brings Isabel to Morris's house, where Morris notices Isabel's discomfort about her relationship with Ted. He confers with Isabel, saying that she does indeed need a man more involved with her love of music, secretly meaning himself. Isabel, however, is afraid of hurting Ted's feelings and getting him to understand what she wants, but Morris promises to take care of the situation himself. Unbeknownst to Isabel, Morris's evil plan involves destroying Ted by exposing him to the lethal Mayan gas the next day, and in effect, making him a mindless ghoul who, like Jocko, must continually rely on the fluid of human hearts to survive (obtained by performing cardioectomies on freshly dead persons). This sets Ted and Morris on a grave-robbing spree through several towns where Isabel is also performing on her tour. Morris tries to get Ted to return home, but Ted is committed to being with Isabel whenever possible, whenever he is not in his unknowing ghoulish state. But, when Ted does become a ghoul again, Morris once more uses him to try to kill off the one person Isabel truly seems to love—Eric Iverson, her partner and pianist. Although his attempt is unsuccessful, Ted is able to obtain another heart, keeping himself alive.

Eventually the police, aided by ace reporter "Scoop" McClure, realize that the mysterious "ghoul"-style killings are on the same route of Isabel's tour. McClure tries to set a trap in Cranston, the last city of Isabel's tour, by making it seem to the public that he is someone else who has recently died, and, by waiting in a coffin for the ghoul, nearly captures Ted and Morris once they arrive to perform another cardioectomy. However, Morris distracts McClure as Ted comes into view and kills him.

With Isabel back home, the police attempt to question her about why the killings were made in the same cities she performed in, but even though she claims to know nothing, she thinks for a moment how Ted and Dr. Morris are the only people associated with her that also have a knowledge of how to perform cardioectomies. She later performs for her home crowd, and Morris, in a last attempt to get Isabel for himself, sends Ted to kill "First Eric, then myself", as he constantly repeats under his spell. Before Ted becomes a ghoul, he is able to write a letter to Isabel that explains what happened to him and who did all of the killings. Plus, he exposes Morris to the gas just before he reverts to his ghoul state, and leaves to fulfill Morris's final bidding. Upon entering the stage where Isabel is, he is promptly dispatched by detectives, just as he is about to shoot Eric, who read the note to Isabel that Ted left in his hands. She and Eric hold each other, knowing that Ted always intended the best for them, and that Morris was behind all of the trouble with which Ted and many others were involved.

Morris, meanwhile, being drained of nearly all life by the gas, almost succeeds in getting fluid from another heart for himself, but fatally collapses by the grave he is digging up. In the end, words that Ted said earlier to Morris are repeated: "It's all over, Doctor. There's nothing left of it now but you, and me, and... death!"

== Cast ==
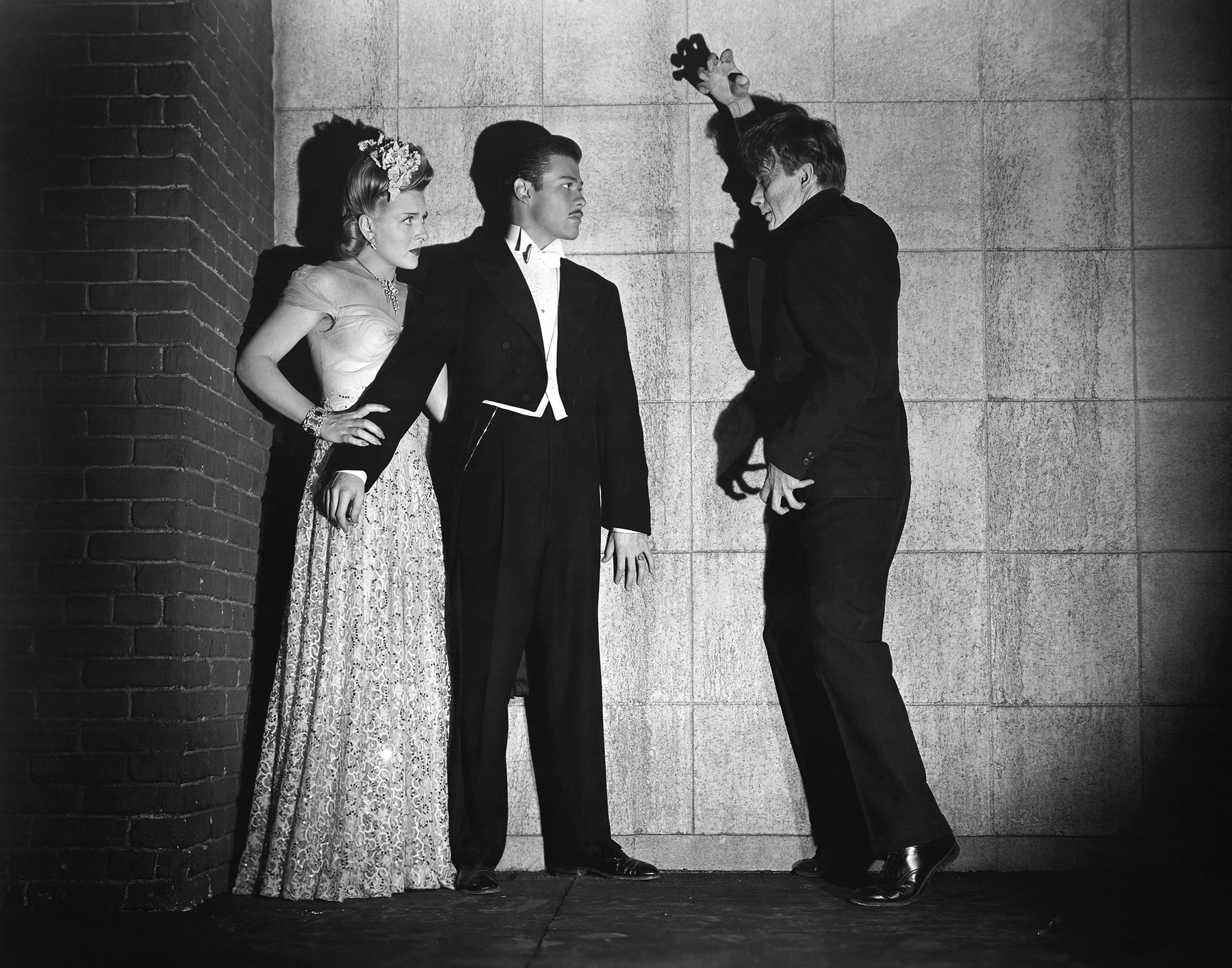
Still with Evelyn Ankers, Turhan Bey, and David Bruce.

Cast is sourced from the book Universal Horrors.

- David Bruce as Ted Allison
- Evelyn Ankers as Isabel Lewis
- George Zucco as Dr. Alfred Morris
- Turhan Bey as Eric Iversen
- Robert Armstrong as Ken McClure
- Milburn Stone as Police Sgt. Macklin
- Rose Hobart as Della Elliot
- Charles McGraw as Detective Garrity
- Andrew Tombes as Mr. Eagan
- Addison Richards as Gavigan

== Production ==
The Mad Ghoul was developed to support Son of Dracula as a double feature. It began development in February 1943 with a script by Paul Gangelin and Brenda Weisberg based on a story by Hans Kraly. It was developed under the title The Mystery of the Mad Ghoul. The director assigned to the film was James Hogan who had just signed to Universal Studios in April after seven years working at Paramount. He died of a heart attack on November 4, 1943, one week before The Mad Ghoul was released.

Among the cast was David Bruce who appeared in minor roles in Warner Bros. films in the late 1930s and early 1940s. After a role in Republic films Flying Tigers, he signed on for a three-year contract with Universal. Bruce was cast as the walking corpse of Ted Allison in the film. In the film, his make-up effects by Jack Pierce has degenerative effect to represent a corpse in an accelerated state of decomposition. Bruce recalled that his make-up was green and his hair was made bright red, and applied "false skin" to him, a process he described as "absolute murder". Bruce wore the effects for three days and when it was removed it caused him to bleed as they had to peel off the make-up. According to a 1995 interview with Bruce's daughter, he would return home from filming and scaring her mother with his make-up and that Bruce had a very pleasant experience on the set, specifically getting along very well with George Zucco. Also among the cast was Turhan Bey, who recalled that director Hogan was "very matter-of-fact, but an excellent craftsman. And a craftsman was what you had to be when you made B pictures". The film began shooting on May 13, 1943, and finished shooting before the end of May. Initially, Universal had planned for Evelyn Ankers to perform her own songs in the film, but the idea was scrapped at the last moment. Library recordings of Lillian Cornell singing were used as a replacement.

== Release ==
The Mad Ghoul was distributed theatrically by Universal Pictures Company on November 12, 1943. On June 7, a film titled Chamber of Horrors was announced by The Hollywood Reporter, noting that the cast would include Boris Karloff, Lon Chaney Jr., Bela Lugosi, Peter Lorre, Claude Rains, George Zucco and James Barton as well as the characters The Invisible Man, The Mad Ghoul, The Mummy and "other assorted monsters". Chambers of Horror never went into production.

It was released for the first time on DVD by Willette Acquisition Corporation on October 7, 2014. Along with Murders in the Zoo (1933), The Mad Doctor of Market Street (1942) and The Strange Case of Doctor Rx (1942), The Mad Ghoul was released on Blu-ray as part of Scream! Factory's Universal Horror Collection Volume 2 on July 23, 2019.

== Reception ==
From contemporary reviews, Wanda Hale of The New York Daily News said the film "you'll get your creeps and chills in abundance at what George Zucco, making with his evil yes does to corpses and a human being [...] Enough occurs to prevent the chills from leaving you until it's over". Floy Stone of The Motion Picture Herald declared the film as "well done, but just that. Zucco's performance is the only one which will command audience attention". Frank Quinn of the New York Daily Mirror found the film was a "rehash of Frankenstein, while finding the film "interesting enough to whet the appetite". John T. McManus declared that along with Captive Wild Woman (1943), Son of Dracula (1943) and Phantom of the Opera (1943) were "unaccountable cinemisdeeds". Bosley Crowther of The New York Times called The Mad Ghoul "definitely a second-rate ghoul. And if anyone is privileged enough to be crazy, it's us poor folks who have to look at such thing".

From retrospective reviews, Leonard Maltin's Movie Guide awarded the film two and a half out of four stars, noting that the strong cast helped buoy the film's grim story.

== See also ==
- List of horror films of the 1940s
- List of Universal Pictures films (1940–1949)
