= Evelyn Ankers =

British-American actress (1918–1985)

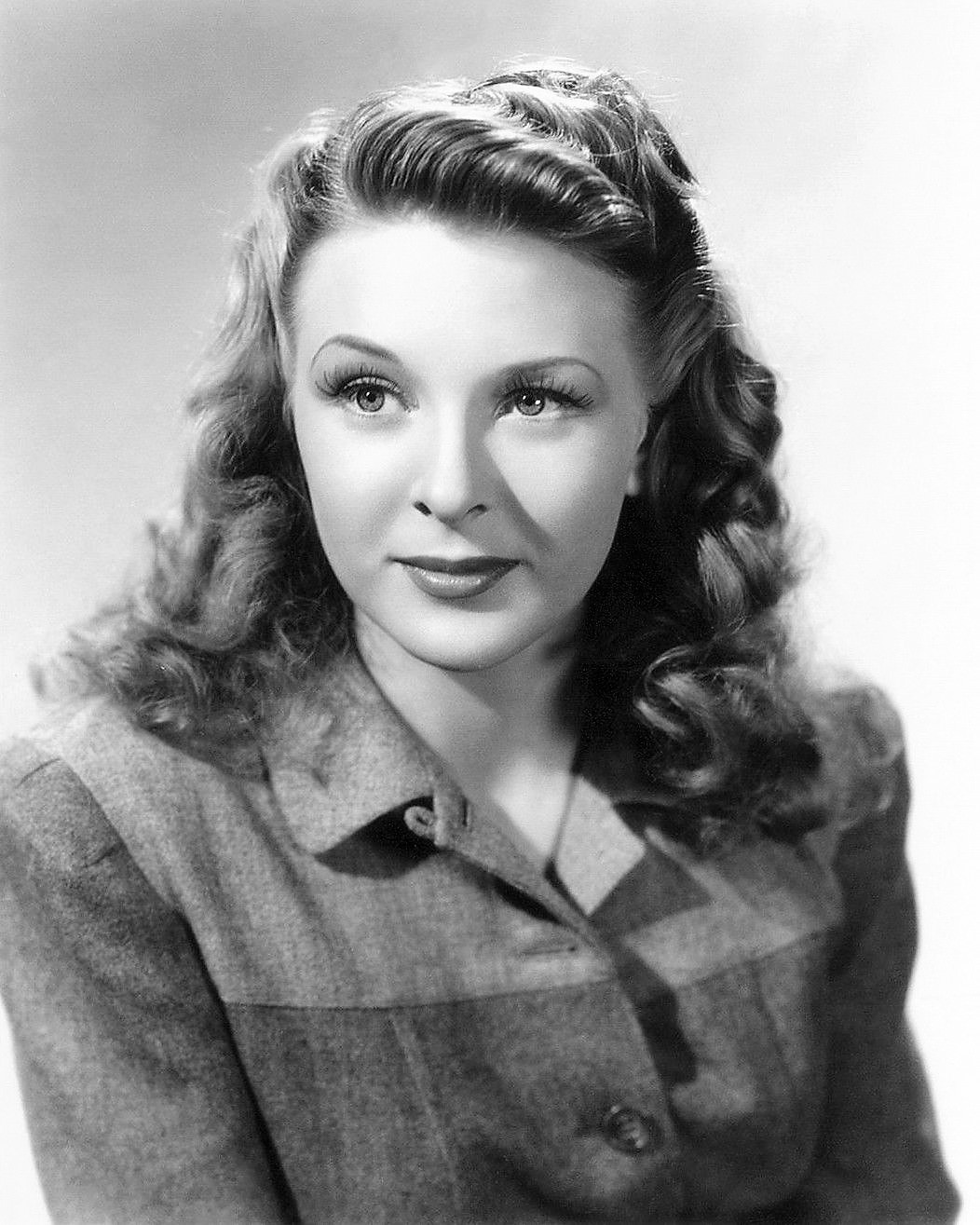
- Ankers in 1941
- Born: Evelyn Felisa Ankers; August 17, 1918; Valparaíso, Chile
- Died: August 29, 1985 (aged 67); Maui, Hawaii, U.S.
- Resting place: Maui Veterans Cemetery, Makawao, Hawaii
- Occupation: Actress
- Years active: 1936–1960
- Spouse: Richard Denning (m. 1942)
- Children: 1

Evelyn Felisa Ankers (August 17, 1918 – August 29, 1985) was a British-American actress who often played variations on the role of the cultured young leading lady in many American horror films during the 1940s, most notably The Wolf Man (1941) opposite Lon Chaney Jr., a frequent screen partner.

== Early years ==
Ankers was born to British parents in Valparaíso, Chile. Her family was in the Andes mountains while her father, a mining engineer from London, was surveying mineral deposits. She was educated at The Latymer School, the Godolphin School, the Tacchomo School of Music and Dramatic Art, and the Royal Academy of Dramatic Art in London. She told a reporter in 1945, "I was there for two years, and the worst actress in the whole academy."

== Stage ==
Ankers' stage debut came in Colombia at age 10 when she had the title role in The Daughter of Dolores. On Broadway, she had the role of Lucy Gilham in Ladies in Retirement (1940). In London, she acted in Bats in the Belfry.

== Film ==
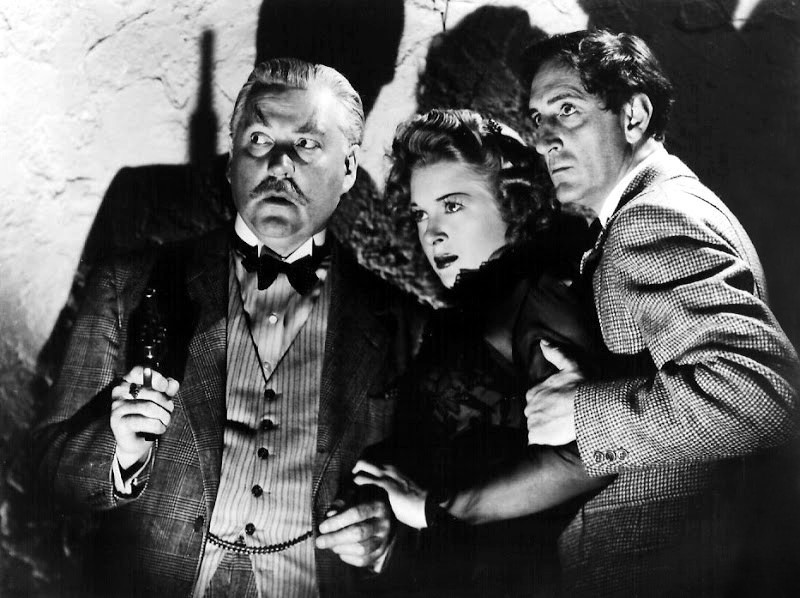
Nigel Bruce, Ankers and Basil Rathbone in Sherlock Holmes and the Voice of Terror (1942)

Known as "the Queen of the Bs", Ankers starred in films including The Wolf Man (1941), The Ghost of Frankenstein (1942), Captive Wild Woman (1943), Son of Dracula (1943), The Mad Ghoul (1943), Jungle Woman (1944), Weird Woman (1944), The Invisible Man's Revenge (1944), and The Frozen Ghost (1945). She appeared in Hold That Ghost (1941), Sherlock Holmes and the Voice of Terror (1942), His Butler's Sister (1943), The Pearl of Death (1944), Pardon My Rhythm (1944), Tarzan's Magic Fountain (1949), and played Calamity Jane in The Texan Meets Calamity Jane (1950), one of many movies for which she received top billing. Her frequent screen partner was Lon Chaney Jr., although they privately disliked each other.

Ankers made over 50 films between 1936 and 1950, then retired from movies at the age of 32 to be a housewife. She occasionally played television roles, such as that of saloon owner Robbie James in the 1958 episode "Gambler" of the ABC/Warner Bros. Western series Cheyenne, with Clint Walker in the title role.

Ten years later, she made her last film, No Greater Love (1960), with her husband Richard Denning.

== Personal life ==
On September 6, 1942, Ankers married Richard Denning, to whom she remained married until her death in 1985. The couple had one child, Diana Denning (later Dwyer). Ankers moved to Hawaii when her husband accepted the role of the governor in Hawaii 5-0. She died of ovarian cancer at the age of 67 on August 29, 1985, in Maui. Ankers and Denning are buried at Makawao Veterans' Cemetery in Makawao, Hawaii.

Ankers became an American citizen in August 1946.

== Selected filmography ==
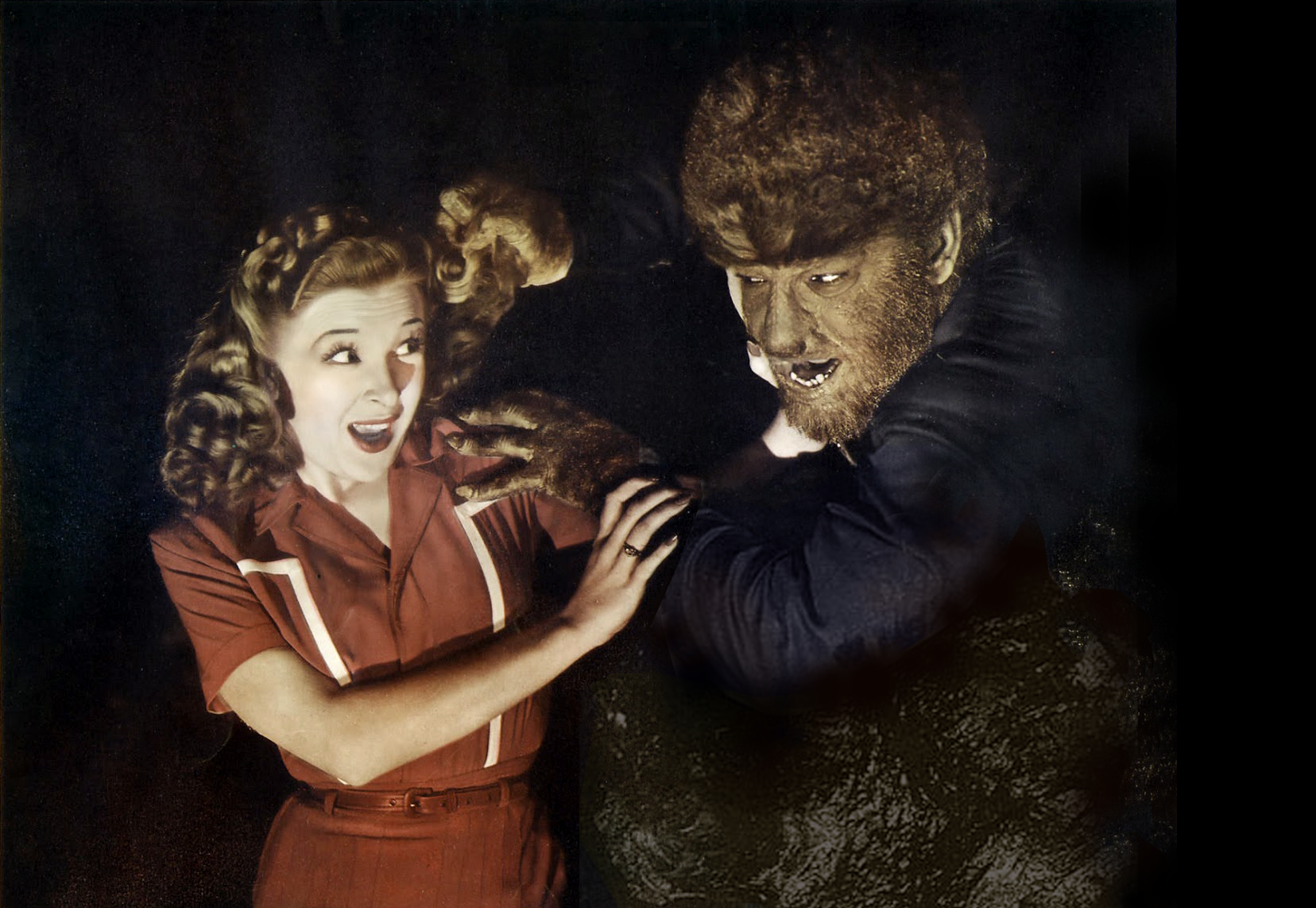
Ankers and Lon Chaney Jr. in The Wolf Man (1941)

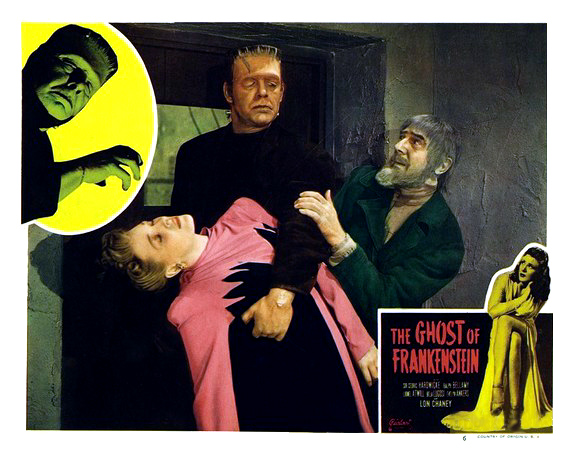
Lobby card with Lon Chaney Jr., Ankers and Bela Lugosi in The Ghost of Frankenstein (1942)

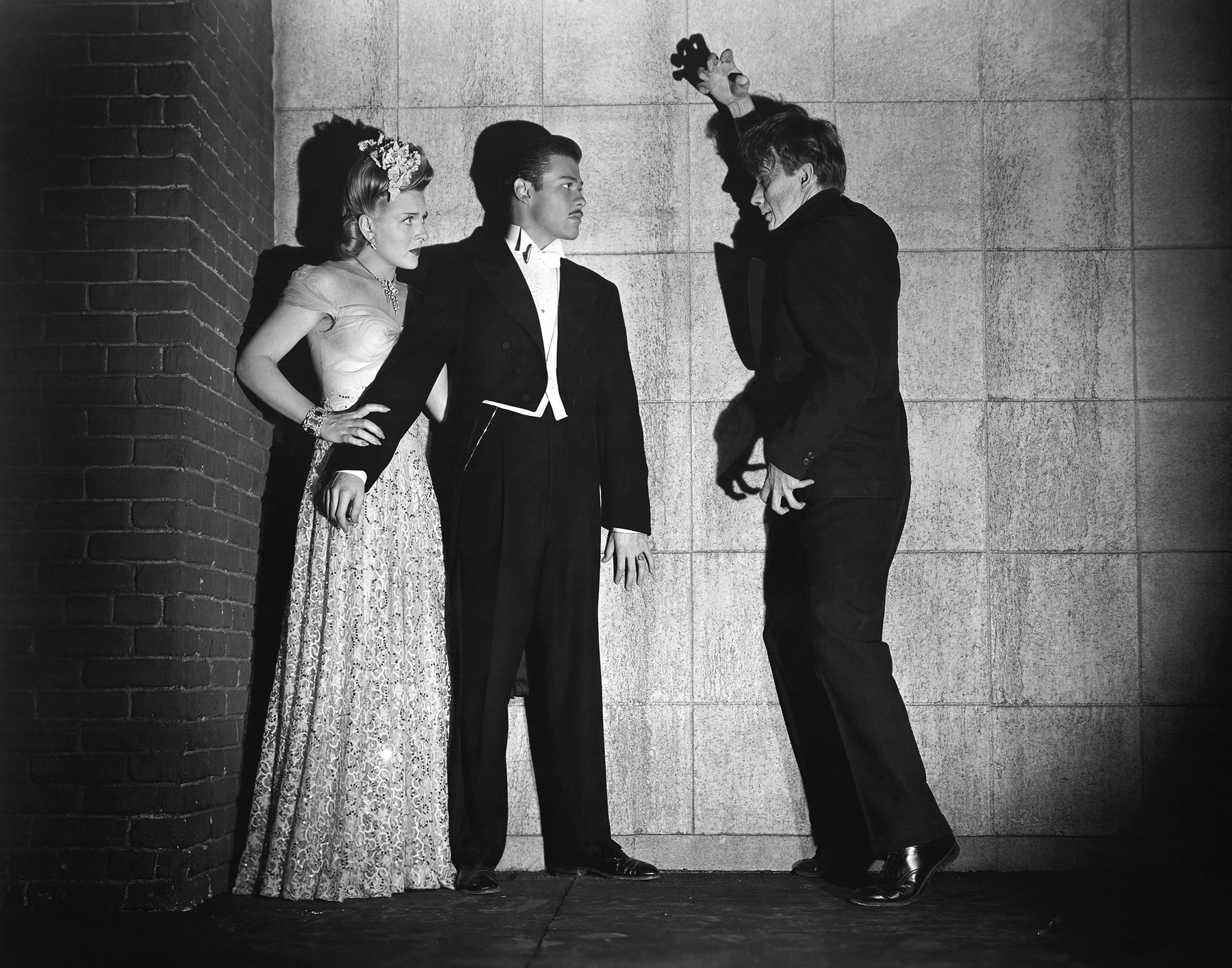
Ankers, Turhan Bey and David Bruce in The Mad Ghoul (1943)

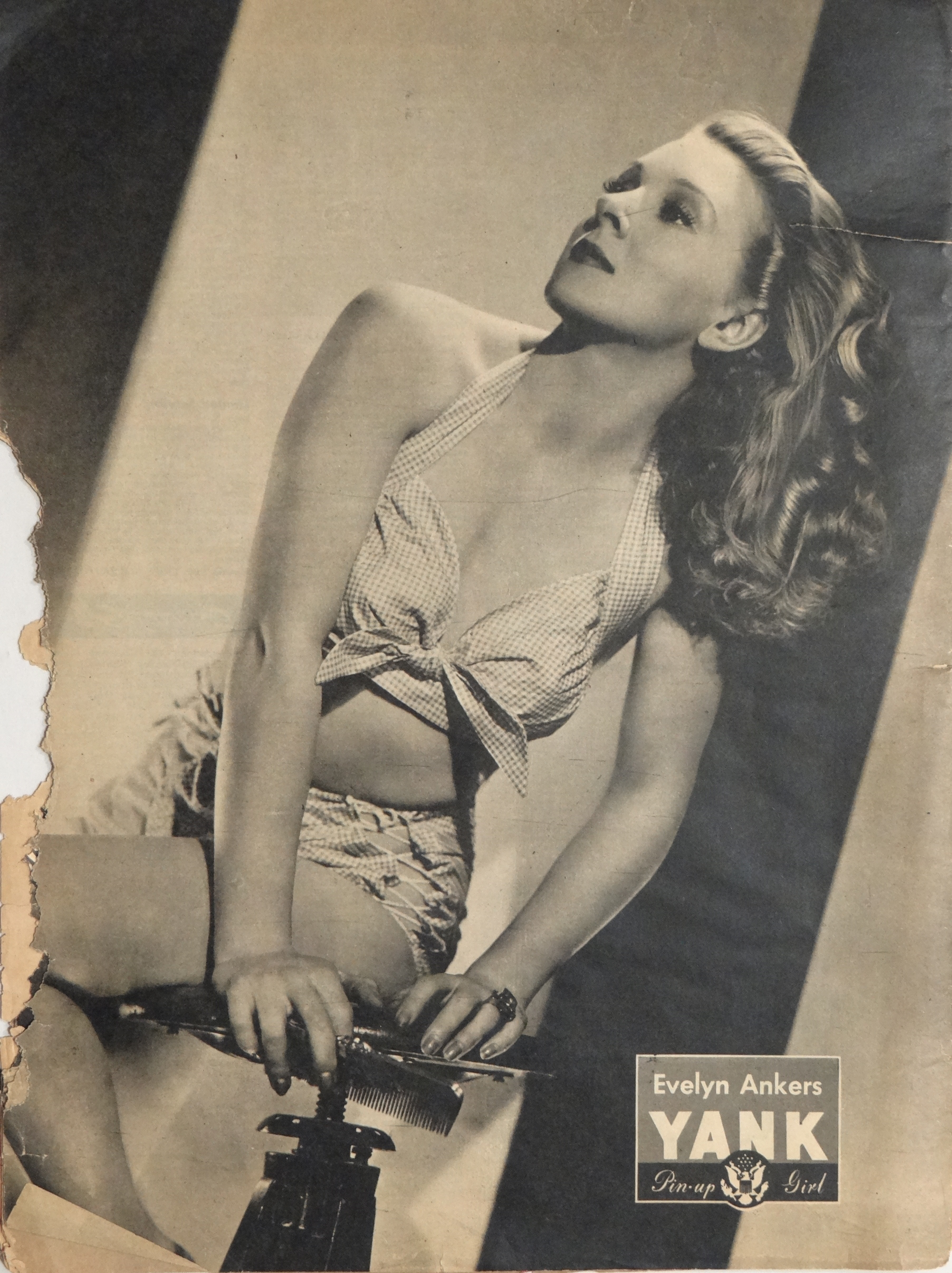
Ankers in 1945 Yank Army magazine pin-up

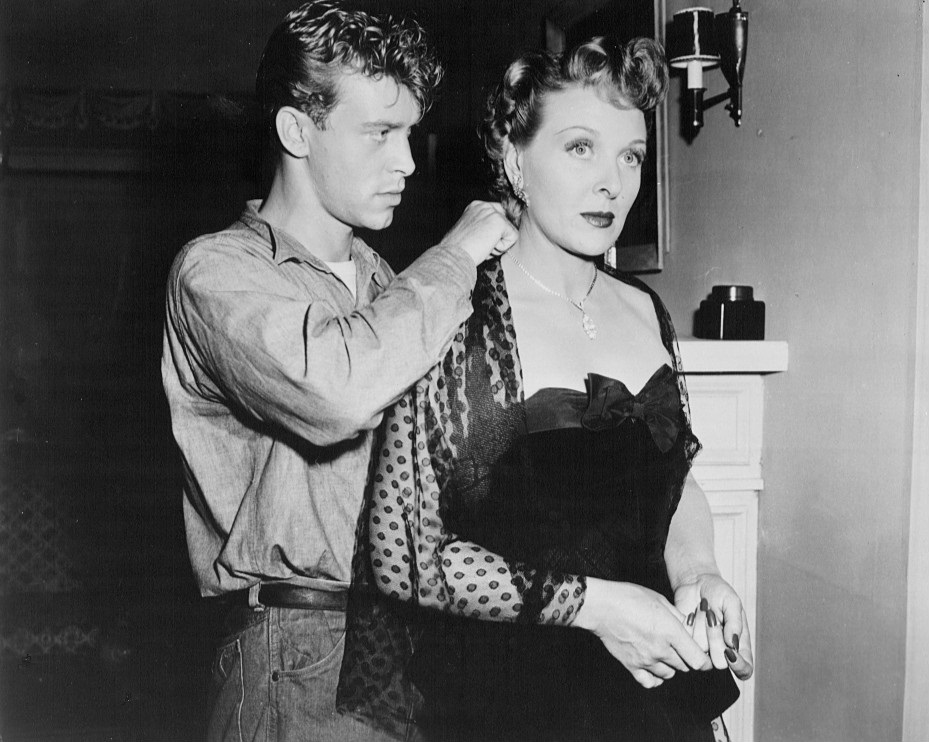
Skip Homeier and Ankers in a General Electric Theatre television episode (1954)

- Land Without Music (1936) as A Lady of the Court (segment "Who said Carlini?") (uncredited)
- Rembrandt (1936) as Party Girl (uncredited)
- Fire Over England (1937) as Lady-in-Waiting (uncredited)
- Wings of the Morning (1937) as Party Guest (uncredited)
- Knight Without Armour (1937) as Minor Role (uncredited)
- Murder in the Family (1938) as Dorothy Osborne
- The Claydon Treasure Mystery (1938) as Rosemary Shackleford
- Coming of Age (1938) as Christine Squire
- The Villiers Diamond (1938) as Joan Raymond
- Second Thoughts (1938) as Molly Frame
- Over the Moon (1939) as Sanitarium Patient (uncredited)
- Bachelor Daddy (1941) as Beth Chase
- Hit the Road (1941) as Patience Ryan
- Hold That Ghost (with Abbott and Costello) (1941) as Norma Lind
- Burma Convoy (1941) as Ann McBragel
- The Wolf Man (with Lon Chaney Jr. and Bela Lugosi) (1941) as Gwen Conliffe
- North to the Klondike (with Broderick Crawford and Lon Chaney Jr.) (1942) as Mary Sloan
- The Ghost of Frankenstein (with Lon Chaney Jr. and Bela Lugosi) (1942) as Elsa Frankenstein
- Eagle Squadron (with Robert Stack and Diana Barrymore) (1942) as Nancy Mitchell
- Pierre of the Plains (1942) as Celia Wellsby
- Sherlock Holmes and the Voice of Terror (with Basil Rathbone) (1942) as Kitty
- The Great Impersonation (1942) as Lady Muriel Dominey
- Keep 'Em Slugging (1943) as Sheila
- Captive Wild Woman (1943) as Beth Colman
- All by Myself (1943) as Jean Wells
- Hers to Hold (1943) as Flo Simpson
- Crazy House (1943) as Evelyn Ankers (uncredited)
- Son of Dracula (with Lon Chaney Jr.) (1943) as Claire Caldwell
- You're a Lucky Fellow, Mr. Smith (1943) as Lynn Smith
- The Mad Ghoul (with Robert Armstrong) (1943) as Isabel Lewis
- His Butler's Sister (1943, directed by Frank Borzage) as Elizabeth Campbell
- Ladies Courageous (with Loretta Young and Diana Barrymore) (1944) as Wilhelmina
- Weird Woman (1944) as Ilona Carr
- Follow the Boys (1944) as Evelyn Ankers (uncredited)
- Pardon My Rhythm (1944) as Julia Munson
- Jungle Woman (1944) as Beth Mason
- The Invisible Man's Revenge (with John Carradine) (1944) as Julie Herrick
- The Pearl of Death (with Basil Rathbone and Rondo Hatton) (1944) as Naomi Drake
- Bowery to Broadway (1944) as Bonnie Latour
- The Frozen Ghost (with Lon Chaney Jr.) (1945) as Maura Daniel
- The Fatal Witness (1945) as Priscilla Ames
- The French Key (1946) as Janet Morgan
- Queen of Burlesque (1946) as Crystal McCoy
- Black Beauty (with Richard Denning) (1946) as Evelyn Carrington
- Flight to Nowhere (1946) as Catherine Forrest
- Spoilers of the North (1947) as Laura Reed
- Last of the Redmen (1947) as Alice Munro
- The Lone Wolf in London (with Gerald Mohr and Eric Blore) (1947) as Iris Chatham
- Parole, Inc. (with Michael O'Shea and Turhan Bey) (1948) as Jojo Dumont
- Tarzan's Magic Fountain (with Lex Barker) (1949) as Gloria James Jessup
- The Texan Meets Calamity Jane (1950) as Calamity Jane
- No Greater Love (with Richard Denning) (1960, Short) (final film role)

== See also ==
- Pin-ups of Yank, the Army Weekly
