= Jack Linkletter =

American television personality (1937–2007)

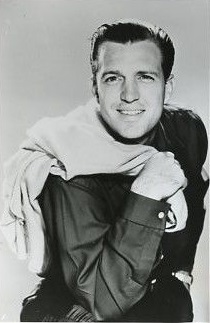
- Linkletter in 1963
- Born: Arthur Jack Linkletter; November 20, 1937; San Francisco, California, U.S.
- Died: December 18, 2007 (aged 70); Cloverdale, California, U.S.
- Occupations: Television personality, businessman
- Years active: 1957–2007
- Spouse(s): Barbara Mae Hughes (m. 1957; div. 1993) Charlene Just Croul (m. 1993)
- Children: 3
- Father: Art Linkletter
- Relatives: Diane Linkletter (sister)

Arthur Jack Linkletter (November 20, 1937 – December 18, 2007) An American game show and television host and entertainer. He is the son of Art Linkletter.

== Early life ==
Linkletter was born Arthur Jack Linkletter in San Francisco. He is the oldest of Lois and Art Linkletter's five children. He was said to have been inspired to enter show business by his father's show House Party.

As a boy, Mr. Linkletter inspired one of his father's most famous "House Party" routines: interviewing young children.

Linkletter was an English major at the University of Southern California in 1958 when he began hosting the NBC-TV prime-time summer replacement quiz show Haggis Baggis.

== Career ==
At 15, Linkletter began doing an interview show for CBS Radio, which was soon followed in 1954 by an hour-long program featuring records and stunts called "Teen Club".

Linkletter hosted seven television shows throughout his career, including Haggis Baggis, Hootenanny, On the Go (1958–59) and Here's Hollywood. He also hosted a number of events and pageants, including the Miss Universe pageant, events for the World's Fair and many parades.

On February 23, 1961, Linkletter and his father, Art, appeared together in "The Bible Man", one of the final episodes of Dick Powell's Zane Grey Theatre, which aired for five seasons on CBS. In the story line, the father, the Reverend Albert Pierce, is a traveling evangelist who is estranged from his grown son, Jimmy. When on television, he otherwise played himself. Linkletter's last major television role was as the main host of the daily NBC daytime talk/variety program, America Alive! in 1978.

Linkletter was president of Linkletter Enterprises, developer and operator of commercial and industrial real estate and manager of diversified family investments. He also operated the Link Fund, a private fund investing in equity and debt instruments. Linkletter served as the International President of Young Presidents' Organization and national director of the 4-H Clubs.

== Death ==
Linkletter died of lymphoma on December 18, 2007, at his home in Cloverdale, California. He was 70 years old.
