= Art Linkletter =

Canadian-born American television personality (1912–2010)

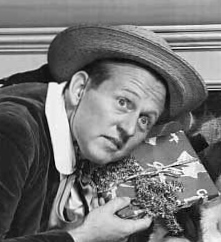
- Linkletter in a promotional photo for People Are Funny in 1957
- Born: Arthur Gordon Kelly; July 17, 1912; Moose Jaw, Saskatchewan, Canada
- Died: May 26, 2010 (aged 97); Los Angeles, California, U.S.
- Occupations: Radio and television personality
- Years active: 1933–2005
- Spouse: Lois Foerster (m. 1935)
- Children: 5, including Jack Linkletter and Diane Linkletter

Signature
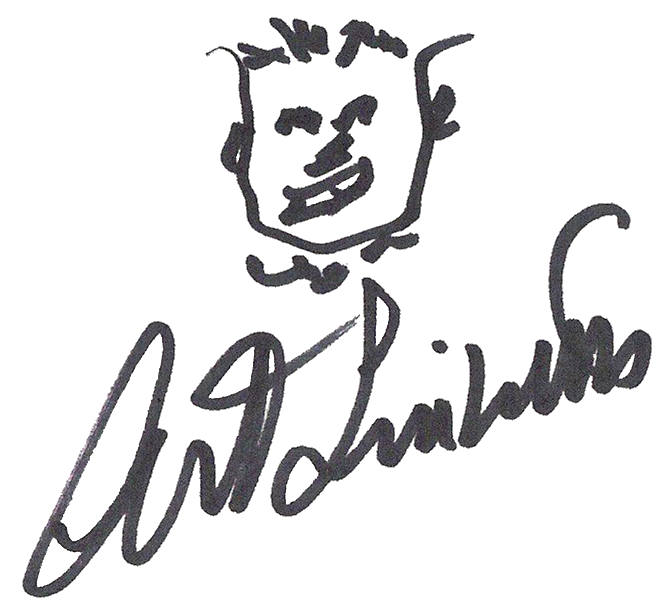

Arthur Gordon Linkletter (born Gordon Arthur Kelly or Arthur Gordon Kelly; sources differ; July 17, 1912 – May 26, 2010) was a Canadian-born American radio and television personality. He was the host of House Party, which ran on CBS radio and television for 25 years, and People Are Funny, which aired on NBC radio and television for 19 years. He became a naturalized United States citizen in 1942.

Old clips from Linkletter's House Party program were later featured as segments on the first incarnation of Kids Say the Darndest Things. A series of books followed which contained the humorous comments made on-air by children. He appeared in four films.

== Early life ==
Linkletter was born in Moose Jaw, Saskatchewan. In his autobiography, Confessions of a Happy Man (1960), he revealed that he had no contact with his natural parents or his sister or two brothers since he was abandoned when only a few weeks old. He was adopted by Mary (née Metzler) and Fulton John Linkletter, an evangelical preacher.

When he was five his family moved to San Diego, California, where he graduated from San Diego High School at age 16. During the early years of the Great Depression he rode trains around the country doing odd jobs and meeting a wide variety of people. In 1934 he earned a bachelor's degree in teaching from San Diego State Teachers College (now San Diego State University), where he was a member of the Alpha Tau Omega fraternity. While attending San Diego State he played for the basketball team and was a member of the swimming team. He had previously planned to attend Springfield College, but did not for financial reasons.

In 1935, he met Lois Foerster. They were married at Grace Lutheran Church in San Diego, November 28, 1935. Their marriage lasted until Linkletter's death, 74 years later.

== Career ==
=== From radio into television ===
After receiving his teaching degree Linkletter decided to go to work as a radio announcer at KGB in San Diego, because radio paid better than teaching. He directed radio programs for fairs and expositions in the mid-1930s. Afterwards, he moved to San Francisco and continued his radio career. In 1943, Linkletter pleaded guilty to falsely claiming US citizenship; he was fined $500 and permitted to apply for citizenship. In the 1940s, Linkletter worked in Hollywood with John Guedel on their pioneering radio show, People Are Funny, which employed audience participation, contests, and gags. The series served as a prototype for future radio and television game shows. People Are Funny became a television show in 1954 and ran until 1961.

Sam Berman's caricature of Linkletter for NBC's 1947 promotional book

=== Early television and film appearances ===
Other early television shows Linkletter worked on included Life With Linkletter with his son Jack (1969–1970) and Hollywood Talent Scouts (1965–1966). He also acted in two movies, People Are Funny (1946) and Champagne for Caesar (1950). Following an appearance in No Greater Love (1960), Linkletter ceased to appear in feature films.

Linkletter declined the opportunity offered by his friend Walt Disney to invest in the Disneyland theme park project, along with building and operating the Disneyland Hotel, due to Linkletter's doubts about the park's prospects. But, out of friendship for Disney, Linkletter volunteered his experience as a live program broadcaster to help organize ABC's coverage of the Disneyland opening in 1955 on what was his 43rd birthday. Besides being an on-air host, he recruited his two co-hosts: Ronald Reagan and Bob Cummings. The park opening experience convinced Linkletter that Disneyland was going to be a huge success. When Disney asked what he could do to show his gratitude for the broadcast's role in the successful launching of the park, Linkletter asked for Disneyland's camera and film concession for its first ten years, a request that was quickly granted. This turned out to be extremely lucrative.

In the 1950s, Linkletter hosted a 15-minute series for syndication titled Art Linkletter and the Kids, seen locally on Saturday mornings in some areas.

On February 23, 1961, Linkletter and his son Jack Linkletter starred together in "The Bible Man," one of the last episodes of Dick Powell's Zane Grey Theatre, which aired for five seasons on CBS. In the storyline, Linkletter is cast as the Reverend Albert Pierce, a traveling evangelist who is estranged from his grown son, Jimmy (Jack Linkletter), because he had tried to avoid telling Jimmy of the real circumstances of the death of Jimmy's mother. The son accused his father of causing the mother's death by burning down her house. However, she was already dead before the fire because a paramour had beaten her to death. The episode ends with the reconciliation of father and son. "The Bible Man" was Jack Linkletter's only dramatic acting appearance. It was the first of two dramatic television appearances by Art Linkletter. His second appearance came in episode 15, season 6 of the series Wagon Train in 1962 alongside Nancy Reagan. When on television, he otherwise played himself.

Linkletter appeared for two stints of two weeks each as a guest host of The Tonight Show in 1962 between Jack Paar's departure and Johnny Carson's arrival as its new host.

=== Toy and game promotions ===
In the 1950s Linkletter became a major investor in and promoter of the hula hoop. In 1963, Linkletter became the endorser and spokesman for Milton Bradley's The Game of Life. His picture appeared on the game's $100,000 bills and also on the box, framed by the statement "I heartily endorse this game."

== Art Linkletter's Kids ==
Art Linkletter's Kids was a 1963–64 gag cartoon panel drawn by the prolific cartoonist Stan Fine and distributed by King Features Syndicate.

== Later years ==
In the 1960s, Linkletter started a dance school, the Art Linkletter School of Jazz, Tap, and Ballet, in Pomona and Claremont, California.

After three public meetings in 1967, an eight-member Los Angeles City Council committee cleared Linkletter and City Council Member Tom Shepard of charges that they were linked in a scheme to influence city purchase of the "financially troubled" Valley Music Theater in Woodland Hills.

In 1988, he appeared as himself on the syndicated sitcom Small Wonder in the episode "Come Fly With Me." At one point he was a spokesman for National Home Life, an insurance company.

=== Activism ===
A registered Republican who campaigned for his old friend Ronald Reagan for President of the United States, Linkletter became a political organizer and a spokesman for the United Seniors Association, now known as USA Next, an alternative to the AARP. As part of this role, Linkletter was active in campaigning for more stringent restrictions on elderly motorists. He was also a member of the President's Council on Service and Civic Participation (which ended in November 2008).

In 1978, he wrote the foreword to the bestselling self-help book Release Your Brakes! by James W. Newman, in which he wrote, "I believe none of us should ever stop growing, learning, changing, and being curious about what's going to happen next. None of us is perfect, so we should be eager to learn more and try to be more effective persons in every part of our lives."

In 2005, at the age of 93, he opened the Happiest Homecoming on Earth celebrations for the 50th anniversary of Disneyland. Half a century earlier, he had been the commentator on the opening day celebrations in 1955. For this, he was named a Disney Legend.

=== Philanthropy ===
Linkletter invested wisely, enabling his considerable philanthropy. A member of Pepperdine University's Board of Regents, Linkletter was also a long-term trustee at Springfield College, where he donated funds to build the swimming center named in his honor, the Art Linkletter Natatorium.

=== Awards and honors ===
Linkletter received a lifetime achievement Daytime Emmy award in 2003. He was inducted into the National Speakers Association Speaker Hall of Fame. He also received honorary degrees from several universities, including his alma mater, San Diego State University; Pepperdine University; and the University of Prince Edward Island. For his contribution to television, he was honored with a star on the Hollywood Walk of Fame, located on 1560 Vine Street. Linkletter received the Golden Plate Award of the American Academy of Achievement presented by Awards Council member Lowell Thomas in 1975. Linkletter quipped that "turning out plaques for television stars is one of our greatest industries," commenting on the number of small town honors he was given.

== Personal life ==
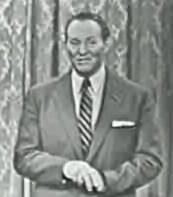
Linkletter on The Jack Benny Show

Linkletter had one of the longest marriages of any well-known person in America, at 74 years. It was the longest Hollywood marriage of all time (prior to his death), and it currently ranks as the fourth-longest Hollywood marriage of all time. He married Lois Foerster on November 25, 1935, and they had five children: Arthur Jack (known as Jack), Dawn, Robert, Sharon and Diane. Lois Foerster Linkletter survived her husband by sixteen months, dying at the age of 95 on October 11, 2011. They outlived three of their five children.

On October 4, 1969, 20-year-old Diane died after jumping out of her sixth-floor kitchen window. Linkletter claimed that her death was drug-related because she was on, or having a flashback from, an LSD trip (toxicology tests later determined there were no drugs in Diane's system at the time of her death). After Diane's death, Linkletter spoke out against drugs to prevent children from straying into a drug habit. On October 24, 1969, he said "Anybody who has said anything which would encourage my daughter to take LSD was unwittingly a part of being her murderer." His record, "We Love You, Call Collect", recorded before her death, featured a discussion about permissiveness in modern society, along with a rebuttal by Diane, titled "Dear Mom and Dad". The record won a 1970 Grammy Award for the "Best Spoken Word Recording".

Son Robert Linkletter died in an automobile collision on September 12, 1980. Another son, Jack Linkletter, died from lymphoma in 2007.

In early 2008, Linkletter suffered a mild stroke. He died at his home in Bel Air, Los Angeles, California, on May 26, 2010, at the age of 97.

After his death, Phyllis Diller stated, "In a couple of months Art Linkletter would have been 98 years old, a full life of fun and goodness, an orphan who made it to the top. What a guy."

== Filmography ==
=== Film ===
Year	Title	Role	Notes
1946	People Are Funny	Master of Ceremonies	Film debut
1950	Champagne for Caesar	Happy Hogan	
1957	The Snow Queen	Himself – English Prologue	
1960	No Greater Love		Final film

=== Television ===
Year	Title	Role	Notes
1942–1960	People are Funny	Himself	NBC Radio & Television Game Show
1945–1967	House Party	Himself	CBS Radio & Television
1950	Life with Linkletter	Himself	
1955	The Jack Benny Program	Himself	Episode: "Peggy King & Art Linkletter"
1955	The Christophers		
1957	Mr. Broadway		TV movie
1957–1962	General Electric Theater	Various Roles	
1961	Zane Grey Theatre	Reverend Albert Pierce	Episode: "The Bible Man"
1962	The Danny Thomas Show	Himself	Episode: "A Promise Is a Promise"
1962	Wagon Train	Sam Darland	Episode: "The Sam Darland Story"
1967	Batman	Himself	Episode: "Catwoman Goes to College"
1968	The Red Skelton Hour	Hobo	Episode: "Love Is an Itch You Can't Scratch"
1970	Here's Lucy	Himself	Episode: "Lucy Loses Her Cool"
1997–2000	Kids Say the Darndest Things	Executive Producer	

== Works ==
- Linkletter, Art (1947). People are Funny, Doubleday & Company, Garden City, New York.
- Linkletter, Art (1957). Kids Say the Darndest Things!. Englewood Cliffs, N.J.: Prentice-Hall. OCLC 336428.
- Linkletter, Art (1960). The Secret World of Kids. New York: Pocket Books. ASIN B0007FZ0X0.
- Linkletter, Art (1962) [1960]. Confessions of a Happy Man. with Dean Jennings. New York: Pocket Books. OCLC 21491400.
- Linkletter, Art (1962). Kids Sure Rite Funny!. Bernard Geis Associate. ASIN B001KZ1FU8.
- Linkletter, Art (1962). Kids STILL say the Darndest Things!. Pocket Books, Inc. ASIN B0007FZWBA.
- Linkletter, Art (1965). A Child's Garden of Misinformation. Random House. ASIN B0007DSKPW.
- Linkletter, Art (1968). I Wish I'd Said That! My Favorite Ad-Libs of All Time. Doubleday. ASIN B000MTRRQO.
- Linkletter, Art (1968). Oops! Or, Life's Awful Moments. Pocket Books. ASIN B0007FBEFS.
- Linkletter, Art (1968). Linkletter Down Under. Kaye Ward. ASIN B000KP2O3Q.
- Linkletter, Art (February 1970). "We Must Fight the Epidemic of Drug Abuse!". Reader's Digest: 56–60.
- Linkletter, Art (1973). Drugs at my Door Step. W Publishing Group. ISBN 0-87680-335-4.
- Linkletter, Art (1974). Women Are My Favorite People. Doubleday. ISBN 0-385-05226-X.
- Linkletter, Art (1974). How to Be a Super Salesman: Linkletter's Art of Persuasion. Prentice-Hall. ISBN 0-13-396606-2.
- Linkletter, Art (1979). Yes, You Can!: How to Succeed in Business and Life. Spire. ASIN B000O8ZB8O.
- Linkletter, Art (1980). I Didn't Do It Alone: The Autobiography of Art Linkletter as Told to George Bishop. Ottawa, Illinois: Caroline House Publishers. ISBN 0-89803-040-4. OCLC 6899386.
- Linkletter, Art (1990). Old Age Is Not for Sissies. Bookthrift Co. ISBN 0-7917-1479-9.
- Linkletter, Art; with Mark Victor Hansen (2006). How to Make the Rest of Your Life the Best of Your Life. Thomas Nelson. ISBN 0-7852-1890-4.
