= Pardon My Rhythm =

1944 film by Felix E. Feist

- Directed by: Felix E. Feist
- Starring: Gloria Jean; Patric Knowles; Evelyn Ankers
- Cinematography: Paul Ivano
- Edited by: Edward Curtiss
- Distributed by: Universal Pictures
- Release date: 1944
- Running time: 62 minutes
- Country: United States
- Language: English

Pardon My Rhythm is a 1944 movie starring Gloria Jean, Patric Knowles, and Evelyn Ankers, featuring Mel Tormé and Bob Crosby, and directed by Felix E. Feist.

== Cast ==
- Gloria Jean as Jinx Page
- Patric Knowles as Tony Page
- Evelyn Ankers as Julia Munson
- Marjorie Weaver as Dixie Moore
- Walter Catlett as O'Bannion
- Mel Tormé as Ricky O'Bannon
- Patsy O'Connor as Doodles
- Ethel Griffies as Mrs. Dean
- Jack Slattery as Announcer
- Linda Reed as Soda Fountain Waitress
- Alphonse Martell as Headwaiter
- Bob Crosby as Orchestra Leader
- James Floyd as Bully

== Production ==
Universal announced the film in January 1944. It was an attempt for Universal to put Jean in an older role.
