= The Texan Meets Calamity Jane =

1950 film by Ande Lamb

- Original film poster
- Directed by: Ande Lamb
- Written by: Ande Lamb
- Produced by: Ande Lamb
- Starring: Evelyn Ankers; James Ellison
- Cinematography: Karl Struss
- Edited by: Dave Milton
- Music by: Rudy De Saxe
- Production company: Columbia Pictures
- Distributed by: Columbia Pictures
- Release date: November 15, 1950
- Running time: 71 minutes
- Country: United States
- Language: English

The Texan Meets Calamity Jane, also known as Calamity Jane and the Texan in a 1952 rerelease, is a 1950 Cinecolor Western film starring Evelyn Ankers as Calamity Jane. It was written, produced and directed by Ande Lamb. The film was shot at the Iverson Movie Ranch, with cinematography by Karl Struss.

The Texan Meets Calamity Jane marks Ankers' final feature-film appearance, as she retired in 1950 to become a housewife.

== Plot ==
Calamity Jane's rightful ownership of a gambling hall is challenged. She nearly loses the business to a shady crook, but Texas lawyer Ellion mounts a legal battle to help her remain in charge. After a sensational fight, letters proving her right are discovered.

== Cast ==
- Evelyn Ankers as Calamity Jane
- James Ellison as Gordon Hastings
- Lee 'Lasses' White as Colorado Charley
- Grace Lee Whitney (credited as Ruth Whitney) as Cecelia Mullen
- Jack Ingram as Matt Baker
- Sally Weldman as Emmy Stokes (as Sally Weidman)
- Rudy De Saxe as Herbert (as Rudy deSaxe)
- Paul Barney as Dave Carter
- Walter Strand as Carlos
- Hugh Hooker as Raoul
- Ronald Marriott as Nick Dade
- Farrell Lester as Rollo (as Ferrell Lester)
- Elmer Herzberg as Henry the Whistler
- William E. Green as Carlin (as William Green)
- Frank Pharr as Sheriff Atwood
- Bill Orisman as Shotgun Messenger
- Lou Pierce as Elmer (as Lou W. Pierce)
- Raven as Raven – Calamity's Horse
