= No Greater Love (1960 film) =

- Opening titles
- Directed by: Jan Sadlo
- Starring: Evelyn Ankers; Richard Denning; Arthur Linkletter
- Production company: Film Services
- Release date: 1960
- Running time: 30 minutes
- Country: United States
- Language: English

No Greater Love is a 1960 American short drama-documentary film directed and produced by Jan Sadlo and starring Evelyn Ankers, Richard Denning and Art Linkletter. The film promotes Christian missionary work.

It is notable for being Ankers' and Linkletter's last movie.

== Cast ==
- Evelyn Ankers as Helen Lund
- Richard Denning as Dr. George Lund
- Art Linkletter
- Walter H Judd
- Robert Cornthwaite
- Ross Elliott
- Vickie Ray
- Gregory Vren
- Mike Dymally
- Ernest Anderson
- Maidie Norman

== Reception ==
The Video Librarian wrote: "No Greater Love is built around a filmed lecture extolling the virtues of American dentists volunteering their services in Africa, with an engaging wraparound story involving a gung-ho dentist who has to convince his reluctant wife to participate."

== Home media ==
The film was released on DVD in 2014 (Gospel Films Archive, dist. by Vision Video).
