= Jack Pierce (make-up artist) =

American makeup artist (1889–1968)

- Pierce working on Boris Karloff
- Born: Yiannis Pikoulas; May 5, 1889; Laconia, Greece
- Died: July 19, 1968 (aged 79); Hollywood, California, US
- Resting place: Forest Lawn Memorial Park, Glendale
- Occupation: Make-up artist

Jack Pierce (born Yiannis Pikoulas; May 5, 1889 – July 19, 1968) was a Hollywood make-up artist known for creating the makeup worn by Boris Karloff in Frankenstein (1931), along with various other classic monster make-ups for Universal Studios.

== Early career ==
After emigrating to the United States from his native Greece as a teenager, Pierce tried his hand at several careers, including a stint as an amateur baseball player.

In the 1920s, Pierce embarked on a series of jobs in cinema—cinema manager, stuntman, actor, even assistant director—which would eventually lead to his mastery of the field of makeup. The small-statured Pierce was never a "leading man" type, and he put his performing career aside to specialize in make-up for other performers. In 1915 he was hired to work on crews for the studio's productions. On the 1926 set of The Monkey Talks, Jack Pierce created the makeup for actor Jacques Lernier who was playing a simian with the ability to communicate. The head of Universal, Carl Laemmle, was won over with the creative outcome. Next came the rictus-grin face of Conrad Veidt in The Man Who Laughs (1928), a silent picture. Pierce was then hired full-time by Universal Pictures motion picture studio. The death of Lon Chaney—who throughout the 1920s had made a name for himself by creating grotesque and often painful horror make-ups—opened a niche for Pierce and Universal, Chaney's films provided audiences with the deformed, monstrous faces that Pierce and moviegoers of the time enjoyed.

Universal's first "talkie" horror film, Dracula (1931), eschewed elaborate horror make-up. Pierce designed a special color greasepaint for Bela Lugosi for his vampire character, but Lugosi insisted on applying his own make-up. For all film appearances of the character thereafter, Pierce instituted a different look entirely, recasting Dracula as a man with graying hair and a mustache. The most significant creation during Pierce's time at the studio was Frankenstein (1931), with Lugosi originally cast as the Monster. The preliminary design (from contemporary newspaper accounts and a recollection of the screen test by actor Edward Van Sloan) was similar to Paul Wegener's German film of The Golem (1920); this is not a surprising idea, since studio head Carl Laemmle Jr. and director Robert Florey were both familiar with German Expressionist films. However, there is some evidence that the Golem look was not actually used in a screen test Florey shot with Lugosi. Both Florey and Paul Ivano, his cameraman for the test, remembered that the makeup was not that different from what Boris Karloff would later wear. Florey's original script shows a sketch that is said to support this idea, along with Florey's handwritten notation that the monster should have electrical bolts on the side of the neck. However, there is no guarantee that the sketch and notes were really made at the same time as the screen test. Whether any aspects of the monster's look were based on other people's suggestions, it is clear that Pierce came up with a design which was horrific as well as logical in the context of the story. So, where Henry Frankenstein has accessed the brain cavity, there is a scar and a seal, and the now famous "bolts" on the neck are actually electrodes: carriers for the electricity used to revive the stitched-up corpse. How much input director James Whale had into the initial concept remains controversial.

Though Lugosi did not appear in Pierce's most famous film, the two would work together in future: they collaborated on the look of his devilish character in the film White Zombie (1932), for which Universal loaned out Pierce.

== Collaboration with Boris Karloff ==
Pierce had a reputation for being bad-tempered, or at least extremely stern, but he had a good relationship with Bo. They both cooperated on the design of the make-up, with Karloff removing a dental plate to create an indentation on one side of the Monster's face. He also endured four hours of make-up under Pierce's hand each day, during which time his head was built up with cotton, collodion and gum, and green greasepaint (designed to look pale on black-and-white film) was applied to his face and hands. The finished product was universally acclaimed, and has since become the commonly accepted visual representation of Mary Shelley's creation.

The Mummy, produced the following year, combines the plot of Dracula with the make-up tricks of Frankenstein, to turn Karloff into an incredibly aged and wrinkled Egyptian prince.

That same year, Pierce designed the Satanic make-up for Lugosi in White Zombie, although this was an independent film, rather than a Universal production.

On November 20, 1957, Ralph Edwards had Boris Karloff on the celebrity biography program This Is Your Life. On that night's program, Pierce unveiled some memories of working together with Karloff on the Universal film lot. Karloff was pleasantly surprised to see Pierce again, and called him the "greatest make-up man in the business".

== Universal Studios monster maker ==
As the head of Universal's make-up department, Pierce is credited with designing and creating the iconic make-ups for films like Frankenstein, The Mummy (1932), The Wolf Man (1941), and their various sequels associated with the characters. Utilizing his "out-of-the-kit" techniques, Pierce's make-ups were often very grueling and took a considerable amount of time to apply. Pierce was always reluctant to use latex appliances, favoring his technique of building facial features out of cotton and collodion, or nose putty. Pierce eventually started using latex appliances, most notably a rubber nose for Lon Chaney Jr. in The Wolf Man (1941) (the edges of the appliance are clearly visible through most of the film), and a rubber head piece for Boris Karloff in Bride of Frankenstein (1935) and Son of Frankenstein (1939).

=== With Lon Chaney Jr. ===
Pierce was not especially liked around Universal, which in part led to his demise at the studio. His most notorious relationship being with Lon Chaney Jr. Both worked on four Wolf Man films and three Mummy films at Universal. Chaney claimed that Pierce compounded difficulties in the long, uncomfortable process with the adding on of sticky appliances. Lon's Wolf Man make-up partially consisted of yak hair being glued to his face, and having it singed with a hot iron. Chaney claimed Pierce would purposely burn him with the hot iron. Chaney also reputedly had an allergic reaction to the rubber headpiece make-up Pierce used on him in The Ghost of Frankenstein. Later, Chaney suffered with Pierce's laboriously wrapped bandages for three Mummy films, though the "make-up" was simply a rubber mask designed to Chaney's face and attached with spirit gum. Genre fans seem to have exaggerated the Pierce-Chaney conflict to huge proportions. Chaney was obviously familiar with the rigors of cosmetic transformation, having watched his father for years. He crafted his own Neanderthal make-up for One Million B.C., which was certainly as elaborate as the eventual one applied to him; reportedly, he also did his own elaborate burned face make-up for The Indestructible Man, primarily because of the low budget. Interviewed a year before his death, Pierce was asked if working with Chaney was difficult, to which Pierce answered, "Yes and no, that's all I can say." As for Chaney, despite the reported acrimony, he later called Pierce a make-up genius second only to Chaney's own father.

=== Signature hair work ===
Outside of his unusual horror makeups, a recurring signature of Pierce's makeup was to give actors a widow's peak hairline. Bela Lugosi and his Spanish-language counterpart Carlos Villarias both wore widow's peak toupees in their respective versions of Dracula in 1931, and Lugosi's makeup for White Zombie included an even more severe widow's peak. Pierce shaved the hairline of Boris Karloff and turned it into an arrow-like widow's peak for the 1934 film The Black Cat, and had comedian Bud Abbott augment his thinning hairline with a widow's peak toupee in his early films with Lou Costello. Pierce even gave Lon Chaney Jr. a low, pointed hairline in such Inner Sanctum films as Strange Confession and 1943's Son of Dracula. Conversely, for 1938's Service de Luxe, a comedy in which Vincent Price made his film debut, Pierce flattened Price's natural widow's peak with hair plugs.

Pierce used the established theatrical method of "laying" beards and mustaches, as did most artists who had risen through the theater and early silent movies. The laborious process involved cutting lengths of hair (human hair, yak hair or crepe hair, depending on the situation), painting spirit gum in a line across the face or jaw, and applying one row of hair. When this dried, a second, overlapping line of hair was glued over that, continuing the procedure until the beard (or werewolf face) was covered. The overall application was then trimmed to the appropriate shape and length. That said, he was not averse to simpler, preformed mustaches or beards. In fact, half of a mustache he applied to John Carradine as Dracula in House of Frankenstein comes loose in Carradine's tumble from a runaway coach.

Jack Pierce was unceremoniously fired from Universal in 1946, after twenty years of service. One theory for this is that Pierce resisted using the new technique of foam latex for make-ups, which was developed in the late 1930s. That presumably would expedite creating monsters faster, thus saving time and money. However, Pierce was no stranger to latex rubber; he had used a latex headpiece on the Frankenstein Monster since 1935, the Wolf Man's brow and nose were always a one-piece rubber appliance, and as noted, the mummy "make-ups" were actually rubber masks. Pierce would farm the creation of these appliances out to craftsman Ellis Berman. Universal made 40 to 60 pictures a year, out of which only a half dozen might include some elaborate character make-up or monster face, and then usually sparingly. He was resistant to using foam latex for old age make-ups, preferring the time-honored procedure of painting a face with spirit gum, applying a layer of tissue paper, then crinkling the paper and repeating the process. In all, most of Pierce's work was supervising his make-up unit, overseeing glamour make-ups on the leading ladies, and standard make-ups for leading men and character players.

More to the point, the new management at the studio, now called Universal International, wanted to upgrade the company image from B-pictures and programmers to prestige pictures. The Westmore brothers, whose name was as well known in the industry as Max Factor, leaned on the studio to hire their youngest brother, Bud, to head the department. Though Bud Westmore's professional experience was limited to minor films for PRC, he was photogenic, charming, and young, unlike Pierce. Universal got the caché of the Westmore name, and Bud Westmore became the head of the department for the next twenty years, and Jack Pierce was out of a job.

== Post-Universal career ==
Occasionally Jack Pierce would land a job on a major production such as Joan of Arc (1948) or the Danny Kaye version of The Secret Life of Walter Mitty, for which he made up Karloff as the Frankenstein Monster for a daydream sequence, cut from the film. Primarily, Pierce's post-Universal employment was on low-budget independent westerns and horror films. Notable Pierce creations during this period include the hirsute halfwit in Teenage Monster, played by 40-ish year old stuntman Gil Perkins, who had doubled Bela Lugosi in Pierce's Monster make-up in Frankenstein Meets the Wolf Man; Beyond the Time Barrier, with a clutch of bald, scarred atomic mutants and leading man Robert Clarke transforming into a withered ancient; Creation of the Humanoids, crafting a race of bald cyborgs with silver eyes via bald caps and scleral contact lenses; and a reprise of his Wolf Man design for Beauty and the Beast (1962), played by Mark Damon.

He created a great many historical, old age, and character make-ups in TV anthology series such as Screen Directors Playhouse, You Are There and Telephone Time. One episode of that show, a drama called The Golden Junkman, featured Lon Chaney Jr. as an unlettered but kindly Armenian junk dealer who ages from his '30s to his '70s in the course of the story, which Pierce handled with aplomb.

His associate from the Universal days, director/producer Arthur Lubin, hired Pierce for what turned out to be his last employment, a steady four years on the Mister Ed television series, from 1961 to 1964.

Pierce died in 1968 in Hollywood from uremia.

== Legacy ==
Jack Pierce's work at Universal has become an influence to many in the entertainment field, including make-up artists Rick Baker and Tom Savini. Jack Pierce was an innovator in the world of screen entertainment and material design. In 2003, Pierce was recognized with a lifetime achievement award from the Hollywood Make-up Artist and Hair Stylist Guild.

On May 15, 2008, a petition was launched to give Pierce a Hollywood Boulevard star for his work.

On May 30, 2013, Cinema Makeup School in Los Angeles dedicated a memorial gallery in honor of Pierce.
