= USA Next =

U.S. lobbying organization

USA Next (also known as USA United Generations), formerly known as the United Seniors Association, is a United States lobbyist group whose slogan is "Building a Legacy of Freedom for America's Families". It presents itself as a conservative senior citizens organization. The group is a 501(c)(4) organization. Since 2001, Charles Jarvis has led the group.

According to the group's website, "USA United Generations and USA NEXT are grassroots projects of United Seniors Association (USA) which is celebrating its 13th anniversary as the non-partisan, 1.5 million-plus nationwide grassroots network Uniting the Generations for America’s Future."

United Seniors Association took in $26.6 million in revenue for 2003 according to the group's IRS form 990.

USA Next presents itself as an interest group for senior citizens as an alternative to the American Association of Retired Persons (AARP).

== Staff and board members ==
Information from Public Citizen and from USA's IRA form 990.

- USA President and CEO Charles Jarvis served as deputy under secretary at the Department of Interior during the Reagan and Bush administrations. Jarvis was also the executive vice president of Focus on the Family. Jarvis received $242,500 in base salary for his work in 2003.
- Craig Shirley, a USA board member, has long been a Republican Party public relations powerhouse. His public relations firm Shirley & Banister Public Affairs currently represents the Republican National Committee (RNC). During the 1984 presidential campaign, he was the director of communications for the National Conservative Political Action Committee, America's largest independent political committee. More recently, he co-founded Conservatives for Effective Leadership, an organization devoted to defeating Hillary Clinton in her Senate bid.
- The New York Times called USA board member Jack Abramoff "one of the most influential—and, at $500 an hour, best compensated—lobbyists in Washington."
- USA board member James Wootton is president of the U.S. Chamber of Commerce Institute for Legal Reform where he advocates for tort "reform." During the 2000 election cycle, PhRMA shoveled $10 million to the Chamber of Commerce to run electioneering ads just before the November election.
- USA lobbyist David Keene is chairman of the American Conservative Union, the nation's largest conservative grassroots organization. Keene is a lobbyist with the Carmen Group.
- Beau Boulter, a USA lobbyist, is a former GOP congressman from Texas who served in the House of Representatives from 1985 to 1989. He formerly lobbied for the Carmen Group and represented the Major Medicaid Hospital Coalition, Northwest Airlines and U.S. Bank.
- Lawyer Curtis Hergé, USA's corporate counsel, served as a member of Reagan's Presidential Transition Team. He later held positions as the assistant to the secretary and chief of staff at the Department of the Interior.
- William Brindley is executive vice president/treasurer for USA. He received $126,000 for his work in 2003.
- Entertainer Art Linkletter served as the group national chair and spokesman.
- Other USA directors and paid staff:
  - Sandra Bulter, director
  - Anne R. Keast, director
  - Ron Robinson, director
  - A. Lee Barrett, Jr., director
  - Anne L. Edwards, director
  - Kathy Diamond, VP member services
  - Mary P. Mahoney, VP legislative
  - Kathleen Pattern, VP marketing

== Criticisms ==
In February 2003, AARP stated that "recently, the U.S. Social Security Administration ordered one of them to halt what it determined to be misleading mailings." USANext was eventually fined $554,000 for two such mailings, violating a 1988 amendment to the Social Security Act in 1988 prohibiting the private use of the phrase "Social Security" and several related terms in any way that would convey a false impression of approval from the Social Security Administration.

The liberal think-tank Center for American Progress stated in its report of November 14, 2003: :COMPANIES HIRE MERCENARY "GRASSROOTS" GROUP: To influence the final Medicare bill, the drug industry has bankrolled a front group to air ads throughout the country. The United Seniors Association (USA) is "a conservative, grassroots organization for the elderly just as likely to be flacking for corporate special interests as it is to be representing seniors." The drug lobby pays the group "as a front for its TV and radio 'issue' ad campaigns," which is also "used by several corporate energy front groups pushing for the GOP [ Republican Party ] legislation."

A May 2004 article from the center-Left The Washington Monthly elaborated as follows:

Then there's the benignly-named United Seniors Association (USA), which serves as a soft money slush fund for a single GOP-friendly industry: pharmaceuticals. USA claims a nationwide network of more than one million activists, but, just like Progress for America, listed zero income from membership dues in its most recent available tax return. USA does, however, have plenty of money on its hands. During the 2002 elections, with an "unrestricted educational grant" from the drug industry burning a hole in its pocket, the group spent roughly $14 million--the lion's share of its budget--on ads defending Republican members of Congress for their votes on a Medicare prescription-drug bill.

In 2004, USANext was one of the groups supporting the Bush administration's Social Security privatization plan. According to the New York Times, the organization had $28 million in annual revenues, and it aggressively seeks contributions from industry: "Health care companies, energy companies, the food industry, just about everybody except for financial investment companies."
