= Charles Jarvis (businessman) =

American businessman

Charles W. Jarvis is the chairman and CEO of USANext, formerly known as the United Seniors Association. He joined the group in 2001.

Charles served as deputy under secretary at the Department of the Interior during the Ronald Reagan and George H. W. Bush administrations. He was legislative director for Senator Charles Grassley (R-Iowa).

Jarvis was campaign chairman for presidential candidate Gary Bauer in 2000. He resigned the position, and as stated in Christianity Today: "Charles Jarvis, Bauer's former campaign chairman, and Tim McDonald, former chief of advance operations, said they resigned from Bauer's campaign because they felt that Bauer was fostering the appearance of sexual impropriety by meeting and traveling alone with the deputy manager." He later became an adviser to Steve Forbes in his run for president.

Jarvis was also the executive vice president of Focus on the Family. Additionally, he is a member of the Council for National Policy, another political Christian organization. He also sits on the national advisory board of For Our Grandchildren a group promoting U.S. Social Security privatization.
