= Son of Dracula (1943 film) =

1943 film by Robert Siodmak

- Theatrical release poster
- Directed by: Robert Siodmak
- Screenplay by: Eric Taylor
- Story by: Curt Siodmak
- Produced by: Ford Beebe
- Starring: Lon Chaney Jr.; Louise Allbritton; Robert Paige; Evelyn Ankers; Frank Craven
- Cinematography: George Robinson
- Edited by: Saul A. Goodkind
- Production company: Universal Pictures Company, Inc.
- Distributed by: Universal Pictures Company, Inc.
- Release dates: 20 October 1943 (Cine Olimpia, Mexico City); 30 October 1943 (United States (Note: Son of Dracula was released October 30 at late night screenings at various cities across the United States. For more details, see Son of Dracula § Release))
- Running time: 78 minutes
- Country: United States
- Language: English

Son of Dracula is a 1943 American horror film directed by Robert Siodmak with a screenplay based on an original story by his brother Curt Siodmak. The film stars Lon Chaney Jr., Louise Allbritton, Robert Paige, Evelyn Ankers, and Frank Craven.

The story takes place in (then) present-day Louisiana, where "Count Alucard" (Chaney) has just taken up residence. Katherine Caldwell (Allbritton), a student of the occult, becomes fascinated by Alucard and eventually marries him. Katherine begins to look and act strangely, leading her former romantic partner Frank Stanley (Paige) to suspect that something has happened to her. Stanley gets help from Dr. Brewster (Craven) and psychologist Professor Laszlo (J. Edward Bromberg), who come to the conclusion that Alucard is a vampire.

The film is the third in Universal's Dracula film series following Dracula's Daughter (1936). The film was made under different circumstances than the previous two entries in the series with a new chairman of the Board working at Universal and several horror sequels being made since the success of the film Son of Frankenstein (1939). The film was initially being written by Curt Siodmak who was later replaced by Eric Taylor. Filming began on January 7, 1943, and concluded on February 2. Few documents related to the film's production survive from studio files or trade reports.

Son of Dracula was held back from release for about six months before its premiere in the United States, with the earliest known release date being on October 20, 1943, at Cine Olimpia in Mexico City. On its initial release, the trade magazine Boxoffice declared Son of Dracula as a hit in the United States where its sales were 23% above average. Initial reception to the film was described as "varied" by film historian Gary Rhodes.

== Plot ==
Count Alucard is invited by Katherine Caldwell to the United States. Caldwell is one of the daughters of New Orleans-area plantation owner Colonel Caldwell. Shortly after his arrival, the Colonel dies of apparent heart failure and leaves his wealth to his two daughters. Claire receives all his money and Katherine his estate "Dark Oaks". Katherine has been secretly seeing Alucard and the two are quickly married. Her former long-time fiancé Frank Stanley confronts the couple and tries to shoot Alucard. The bullets pass through the Count's body and hit Katherine. Assuming she is dead, a shocked Frank runs off to tell Dr. Brewster what has happened. On the doctor's arrival, he is greeted by Alucard and a living Katherine. The couple instruct him that they will be devoting their days to scientific research and only welcome visitors at night. Frank goes on to the police and confesses to the murder of Katherine. Brewster tries to convince the Sheriff that he saw Katherine alive, but the Sheriff insists on searching Dark Oaks. He finds Katherine's dead body and has her transferred to the morgue. Frank is charged with murder and put in jail.

Meanwhile, Hungarian Professor Lazlo arrives at Brewster's house. Brewster has noticed that "Alucard" is "Dracula" spelled backwards, while Lazlo suspects vampirism and says that Alucard could be a descendent of Count Dracula himself. While they are talking Alucard appears and tries to attack Dr. Brewster but Professor Lazlo drives him away with a cross. A local boy brought to Brewster's house confirms this suspicion, there are bite marks on his neck. Katherine sneaks into Frank's cell and explains that she only married Alucard to obtain immortality and wants to share it with Frank, her true love. He is initially repulsed by her idea, but then yields to her. After she explains that she has already drunk some of his blood, she advises him on how to destroy Alucard. He breaks out of prison, seeks out Alucard's hiding place and burns his coffin. Without his daytime sanctuary, Alucard is destroyed when the sun rises. Brewster, Lazlo, and the Sheriff arrive at the scene to find Alucard's remains.

Meanwhile, Frank stumbles into the playroom where Katherine said she would be. He finds her coffin and gazes down at her lifeless body. Knowing he must kill the love of his life, Frank takes off his ring and puts it on Katherine's left ring finger. Once Brewster and the others reach the room, they see Frank appear at the door. He steps back allowing them to follow. As they enter the room, they see Katherine's burning coffin. They all stare, speechlessly, while Frank mourns the loss of his love.

== Cast ==
Cast adapted from the book Universal Horrors:

- Lon Chaney Jr. as Count Alucard / Count Dracula
- Louise Allbritton as Katherine Caldwell
- Robert Paige as Frank Stanley
- Evelyn Ankers as Claire Caldwell
- Frank Craven as Dr. Harry Brewster
- J. Edward Bromberg as Professor Lazlo
- Samuel S. Hinds as Judge Simmons
- Adeline De Walt Reynolds as Queen Zimba
- George Irving as Colonel Caldwell
- Etta McDaniel as Sarah
- Patrick Moriarity as Sheriff Dawes
- Walter Sande as Matt
- Sam McDaniel as Andy

== Production ==
=== Development and pre-production ===
Son of Dracula was the third Dracula film produced by Universal, following the 1936 film Dracula's Daughter. Within three weeks of the premier of Tod Browning's Dracula (1931), Universal presented three titles for follow-ups to the Hays Office. These included The Modern Dracula, The Return of Dracula and The Son of Dracula. No notes exist regarding the possible story content for any of these films. Son of Dracula was prepared under different standards at Universal than the previous two films. The company had only restarted production on horror films in 1938 with the film Son of Frankenstein (1939) and Universal's Chairman of the Board J. Cheever Cowdin had been heavily involved in the formation of the company. Profits at Universal by 1941 were higher than they had been in 1940 while a double bill of both Dracula and Frankenstein (1931) in early 1942 was declared to have done "staggeringly good business" in the Motion Picture Herald. Following these events, the Daily Variety announced on June 5 that two new horror films were announced with Lon Chaney Jr.: Frankenstein Meets the Wolf Man (1943) and Son of Dracula.

Curt Siodmak was commissioned to write a script for the film in May 1942. By June 8, the Los Angeles Times announced that Curt Siodmak was still writing the screenplay. Curt Siodmak's previous work was deeply rooted in horror and science fiction, from the original novel and screenplay for F.P.1 (1932) and screenplays in Hollywood for Black Friday (1940), The Invisible Man Returns (1940), The Ape (1940), The Wolf Man (1941), and Invisible Agent (1942). On July 24, the Motion Picture Herald announced that Universal had purchased Siodmak's finished draft of the script. The Daily Variety noted that Eric Taylor was given the task of writing the final script. Taylor had worked previously on Black Friday with Siodmak as well as on Phantom of the Opera (1943) and The Ghost of Frankenstein. In a 1984 interview with Tom Weaver, Curt Siodmak said that after his brother Robert Siodmak was hired as the film's director, the latter made his brother leave the project. Curt explained that the two "had a sibling rivalry. When we were in Germany, Robert had a magazine and when I wrote for it, I had to change my name. He only wanted one Siodmak around. This lasted 71 years, until he died". In his book on Son of Dracula's production history, Gary D. Rhodes suggested that Curt might have been wrong about this specific situation as there was no indication that Robert was hired as the director when Taylor was hired for the script. Weaver suggested that the film took place outside the universe of Dracula (1931) and Dracula's Daughter (1936). Weaver noted that, in Son of Dracula, Prof. Lazlo states that Count Dracula was destroyed in the 19th century, making it not follow the story of the two previously mentioned films. Weaver also highlighted a pressbook article that stated that "although Son of Dracula is not a 'continuation' of [the 1931 Dracula], it is based mainly on the same ghoulish legend of the vampire".

Outside of Chaney, Louise Allbritton was cast as Katherine with her role being announced by Universal on January 7. This date lead to Rhodes suggesting that she was cast at the very last minute. Based on press accounts, Evelyn Ankers was cast as Claire before most actors other than Chaney. Ankers had previously acted in other Universal features including Hold That Ghost (1941), The Wolf Man, The Ghost of Frankenstein, Captive Wild Woman (1943) and The Mad Ghoul (1943). Universal announced that Frank Craven and J. Edward Bromberg had been cast on January 12, 1943.

=== Production ===
In July 1942 it was initially announced that production was set to start in September. The Hollywood Reporter later announced in December that production would start on January 4, 1943. To meet this deadline, Universal sent a new draft of the script to the Production Code Administration (PCA) on December 29 with a script titled Destiny for approval. The response dated December 31 stated that this current script would not be approved by the PCA, leading to another script sent on January 4, 1943, which delayed the films production. Production began on Son of Dracula on January 7.

George Waggner was originally set to be the associate producer on the film, but became too sidetracked by Phantom of the Opera. He was replaced with Ford Beebe in mid-January. Beebe had previously co-directed the film serials Flash Gordon's Trip to Mars (1938), Buck Rogers (1939), The Phantom Creeps (1939) and Flash Gordon Conquers the Universe (1940), as well as feature films such as Night Monster (1942). He would also be the film's second unit director. A casting change was made on set, as Alan Curtis who originally had the role of Frank was replaced by Robert Paige after Curtis suffered a knee injury while filming the final scenes of Flesh and Fantasy (1943). According to Rhodes, few details about the production of Son of Dracula survive in the form of studio files or trade reports. Production on the film ended on February 2.

Robert Siodmak, then on a $150 a week contract, said he was reluctant to take the film; he called the script "terrible—it had been knocked together in a few days". He said that he was persuaded to take the job by his wife, who said that, if he showed he was "a little bit better" than Universal's other directors, it would impress the studio. Three days into shooting, he was offered a seven-year contract. He commented: "We did a lot of rewriting and the result wasn't bad. It wasn't good but some scenes have a certain quality".

The film was edited by Saul A. Goodkind. Goodkind had worked with Beebe as an editor on Flash Gordon and Flash Gordon's Trip to Mars. Rhodes commented again that little is known about the post-production of the film; he noted that only minor changes in dialogue beyond what is written in the final shooting script are present in the finished film.

== Release ==
Son of Dracula was held back from release for about six months before its premiere in the United States. The Motion Picture Herald had the film listed as being among the 162 features Hollywood Studios had yet to assign a release date in their February 27, 1943, issue. Discussing the film's release, Robert J. Kiss hypothesized that their delay was related to war films that generally needed to be accommodated into release to retain their topicality, as the United States had entered into World War II. Prior to its release in the United States, the film was released at Cine Olimpia in Mexico City on October 20, 1943. It was released with a Spanish-language dub as El hijo de Dracula on the top half of a double feature with Captive Wild Woman. Another screening took place in Canada on November 1, 1943, for a three-day run at the Capitol Theatre in Brandon, Manitoba.

Son of Dracula and The Mad Ghoul had been put into late night midnight screenings on October 30 in small towns in cities in the United States. For instance, it was screened at the Tivoli Theatre in Maryville, Missouri, and the Parks Theatre in Cedar City, Utah. Most trade presses declared the screening at the Rialto in New York City on November 5 as the premiere, although the theatre did not bill the engagement as such. At the Rialto, the film was held over from its initial two week booking into a fourth week, with the film grossing $11,000 in its first week. In the November 11, 1944, issue of the trade magazine Boxoffice, a report showed the first-run performances of 336 features released between the third quarter of 1943 and mid-year 1944 from 22 major American cities. Ticket sales for Son of Dracula were 23% above average sales and declared a hit by the publication. It was Universal's best-performing film in either the horror or science fiction genres during this period. In comparison, Universal's Jungle Woman (1944) and The Invisible Man's Revenge (1944) performed 14% and 13% above average respectively. Meanwhile, The Mummy's Ghost (1943) and The Mad Ghoul (1944) were 5% above average and 2% below average respectively. Comparing the film to non-Universal outings in the genre, the film did not do as well as 20th Century Fox's The Lodger (1944) or Paramount Pictures' The Uninvited (1944), had the same average as RKO's The Ghost Ship (1943), and beat Columbia's The Return of the Vampire. Outside of large cities, bookings for Son of Dracula lasted for two or three days which was the standard practice of the period.

Son of Dracula was first reissued theatrically in 1948. In August 1951, Realart Pictures released Son of Dracula as parts of its "7 Days of Horror" package, which featured 14 Universal films over the course of a week. The film was also part of Screen Gems' Shock! package of 52 pre-1948 Universal feature films released to television in October 1957. It was first shown on television in 1957; by October 1958, Son of Dracula has played on television stations across America. Son of Dracula was first released on VHS and Betamax in 1988. It was released on DVD as part of the Dracula: The Legacy Collection and the Monster Legacy Collection in April 2004 and on Blu-ray on May 16, 2017, as part of the Dracula: Complete Legacy Collection set.

== Reception ==
Rhodes declared that initial critical reception to Son of Dracula was "varied". From contemporary reviews, The Hollywood Reporter declared that Son of Dracula was "a topline entry" as a horror film as it was "well made" with "intelligent direction by Robert Siodmak" and that "Chaney's Dracula is an outstanding job, accomplished without the gobs of makeup with which he is generally smeared". Irene Thirer of The New York Post ranked the film as "Fair to good", finding it "is neatly turned out [...] and is certainly guaranteed for goose-pimples—and we might add, laughs". A. H. Weiler of The New York Times found the film as "unintentionally funny as it is chilling" and concluded it a "pretty pallid offering". A review in Harrison's Reports noted that Son of Dracula was "extremely weird, fantastic, and morbid, but because the theme has been done many times, it fails to attain the terrifying impact of the original".

In their book Universal Horrors, Weaver, Michael Brunas and John Brunas stated that Son of Dracula is "often lumped together with the rest of the Universal monster pictures of the '40s in the early years of horror scholarship, it has incrementally been seen as the product of a more sophisticated mindset" and in the canon of Robert Siodmak's career, Son of Dracula was "still regarded as a footnote, a stepping stone to his later highly regarded film noir works". Bob Mastrangelo of AllMovie referred to the film as "strictly minor-league, harmless entertainment that never reaches its potential", finding Chaney was "not doing a very good job" but that "the problems with Son of Dracula are beyond Chaney, as the script never really takes advantage of the juicy potential of the story and lacks the dark humor and beautiful atmospherics that make the best Universal horror films so timeless". Sean Axmaker wrote in The Seattle Times that Son of Dracula was a "moody minor horror gem" that was held back by "clumsy antics of the skeptical cops and the plodding exposition spouted by an old Carpathian doctor".

In an interview with Starlog magazine in 1990, Curt Siodmak reflected on Son of Dracula stating that the film "became a classic through Robert [Siodmak]'s handling of light and shadow. He was wonderful on mood, characterization, atmosphere, the psychology. He could make marvelous scenes. But he couldn't write".

== See also ==
- Dracula in popular culture
- List of horror films of the 1940s
- Vampire films
