= Universal Monsters =

Horror and science fiction franchise

Universal Classic Monsters
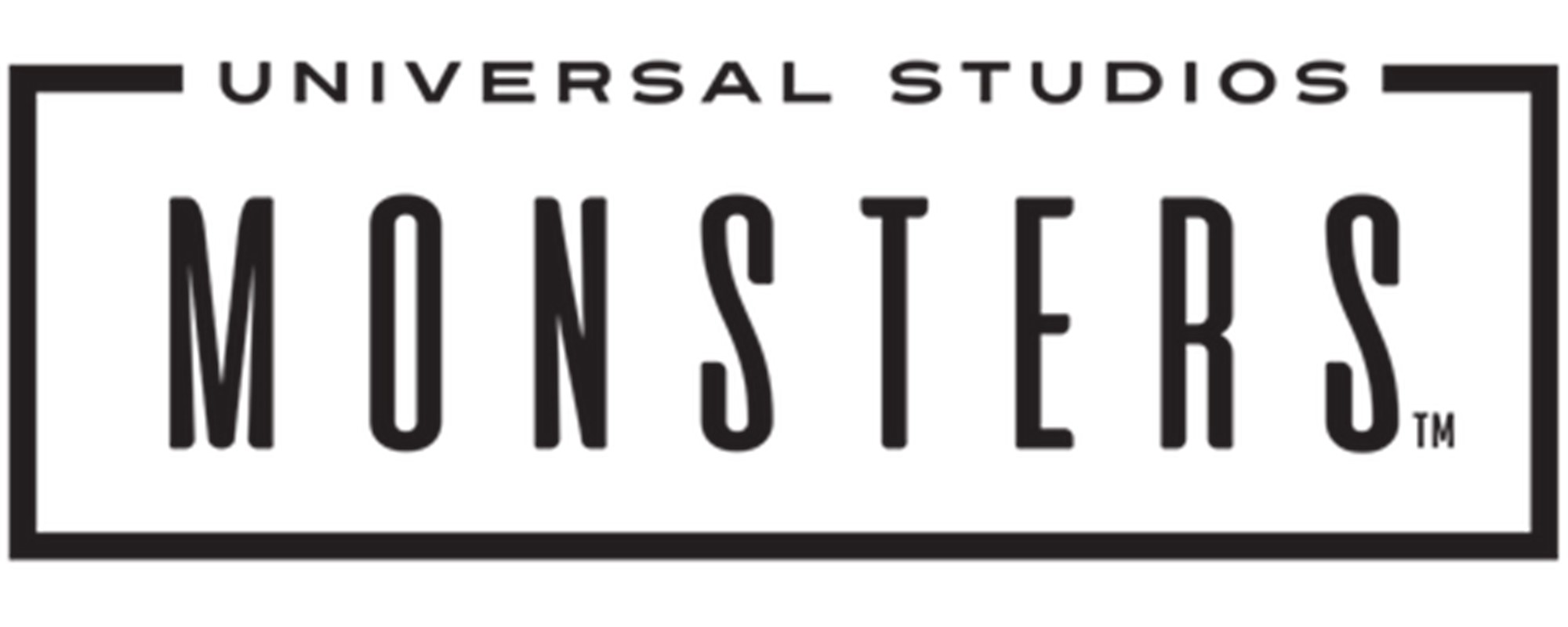
- Official franchise logo
- Original work: Dr. Jekyll and Mr. Hyde (1913)
- Owner: Universal Pictures
- Years: 1913–present

Print publications
- Novel: See details
- Comics: See details

Films and television
- Film: See details
- Short film: See details
- Television series: See details

Miscellaneous
- Theme park attraction: See details

The Universal Monsters (also known as Universal Classic Monsters and Universal Studios Monsters) is a media franchise comprising various horror film series distributed by Universal Pictures. It consists of different horror creature characters originating from various novels, such as Dr. Jekyll / Mr. Hyde, the Phantom of the Opera, Count Dracula, Frankenstein's monster, the Mummy, and the Invisible Man, as well as original characters the Wolf Man and the Creature from the Black Lagoon.

The original series began with Dr. Jekyll and Mr. Hyde (1913) and ended with The Creature Walks Among Us (1956). While the early installments were initially created as stand-alone films based on published novels, their financial and critical success resulted in various cross-over releases between the monsters, as well as other properties such as Abbott and Costello. Following the positive response to various viewings of these films via television redistribution which began airing in the 1950s, the studio began developing the characters for other media. In the 1990s, it became priority for Universal to promote their catalogue with official packaging that presented films with the official franchise title. Through a number of VHS editions, their popularity continued into contemporary entertainment. This included additional development through modern-filmmaking adaptations, beginning with Dracula (1979) and most recently Wolf Man (2025).

Modern analyses describe the titular characters as "pop culture icons", while the franchise as a whole is often cited as the prototypical example of the shared universe concept in film. In addition to the films, the franchise has expanded to include novels, comics, and theme park rides.

== History ==
Universal's early horror films were adaptations of work from familiar authors and texts to give their films a prestige appeal. These included Dracula (1931), whose success led to the production of other works such as Frankenstein (1931). Frankenstein's ending was changed by studio head Carl Laemmle Jr., who wanted Universal to be able deploy key characters from the film into subsequent Universal productions. Following the release of other Universal films such as The Mummy (1932), The Invisible Man (1933) and Bride of Frankenstein (1935), there was a dry spell of horror films. Universal only returned to the style following a successful theatrical re-release of Dracula and Frankenstein. The renewed interest in horror films led to new works, starting with Son of Frankenstein (1939).

Universal would only introduce a few new monsters in the 1940s, with the most famous being Lon Chaney Jr. as The Wolf Man in The Wolf Man (1941). The decade had Universal's horror output include many remakes and sequels, with films often directly reusing old sets, footage, and narratives to replicate moments in their earlier horror productions.

Universal's first transmedia properties appeared in the 1940s and the 1950s with the films Frankenstein Meets the Wolf Man (1943), House of Frankenstein (1944), House of Dracula (1945) and Abbott and Costello Meet Frankenstein (1948). In these films, the monsters from the studio's earlier films "team up" against various characters. Author Megan De Bruin-Molé suggested that the Universal Classic Monsters films exist as a loose mash-up, which allowed for Dracula to exist and be watched separately from Frankenstein but allowed their characters to be systemically and consistently brought together and developed in other films and media. These productions made were often crossovers and sequels, such as Frankenstein Meets the Wolf Man, House of Frankenstein, House of Dracula and several occurrences in comedy films of Abbott and Costello meeting the monsters. These meetings started with Abbott and Costello Meet Frankenstein and ended with Abbott and Costello Meet the Mummy (1955). De Bruin-Molé wrote that this approach from Universal was for commercial marketing terms, as it would establish the company as the "real" home of horror. Their films contained a world where potentially all monsters may dwell. The sole new monster films that Universal produced in the 1950s were the Creature from the Black Lagoon (1954) and The Mummy (1959), the latter as a co-production with the British Hammer Film Productions.

Towards the 1960s, the Universal monsters grew beyond film and became more consistently transmedial. Initially, this began in 1957 when Universal struck a ten-year television deal with Screen Gems to distribute 52 of their own titles. These television screenings and the films being included on Mel Jass' Mel's Matinee Movie (1958-1979) would also prove to be popular. Stephen Sommers, director of The Mummy (1999), stated that his introduction to the series was on Jass's program. Universal became part of the Music Corporation of America (MCA) in 1962. By 1964, Universal Studios tours would eventually include appearances from Frankenstein's monster. Several products based on the characters from Universal's film series were released, ranging from plastic model kits, Halloween masks, figures, plush dolls, toys, drinking glasses, coloring books and postage stamps. While some of these objects bear similarity to the actors who portray them, others are more generic interpretations. Other mediums featured the Universal monsters in tandem, such as Bobby "Boris" Pickett's 1962 popular song "Monster Mash" and the television series The Munsters (1964) which was based on the likeness of the Universal characters.

In 1990, Universal was part of a merger between Matsushita, now known as Panasonic, and several other corporations. Between 1991 and 1994, Universal released VHS home video editions from their catalogue of horror films. This was the first time these films were packed together as the "Classic Monster" line, accompanied with a newly designed logo. Prior to this home video series, the Universal films that featured multiple monsters were called "Super-Shocker[s]" or "monster rallies". Louis Feol, the head of Worldwide Home Video for Universal Studios, said that the most important thing was the packaging of their sales. He added that it was "probably our single biggest priority and has been for a number of years", and that it was key to make the series of films "look like a line". In a 1999 interview, Feol stated that creating the series was to "reinvigorate and re-market" the Universal catalog, specifically with their series of Dracula, Frankenstein, The Invisible Man, The Phantom of the Opera, The Wolf Man, and The Mummy.

The 1990s also saw a trend in the merchandising of Universal Monsters material as part of a trend for the decade of recycling and reinventing old material from the past. This led to the release of Stephen Sommer's The Mummy (1999) and a "monster rally"-styled film with Van Helsing (2004). Merchandizing of the characters in formats such as clothing and board games has continued into the 21st century. The franchise is featured in the Dark Universe portion of Universal Orlando theme park, Universal Epic Universe, which opened on May 22, 2025.

Beginning in October 2013, Universal hired Roberto Orci and Alex Kurtzman to collaborate in developing a relaunch of the Universal Monsters characters as a new shared universe of films similar in fashion to the Marvel Cinematic Universe, notably a franchise which includes interconnectivity that originated previously in the classic Universal Monsters films. By July 2014, the studio officially hired Chris Morgan to replace Orci and work alongside Kurtzman in overseeing development of an interconnected series of films based around rebooted versions of the Universal Monster characters. The duo was tasked with creating the overall outline for the titular monsters. The development of a cinematic universe continued as Kurtzman and Morgan became involved with additional photography for Dracula Untold (2014); reshoots positioned the final scenes of the film in modern-day, in order to connect with other films and to allow the cast to reprise their roles in future installments. The film's connections to the new franchise were later downplayed following its mixed critical and financial reception, with The Mummy (2017) repositioned as the official start of the shared film universe. In May 2017, the slate of reimagined incarnations of titular monsters was officially titled Dark Universe. The studio announced the franchise with a press release, which debuted the official logo, website, trailer, and score. Universal Pictures, in collaboration with Kurtzman and Morgan, created a writer's room consisting of various contributors to create stories that were to be expanded into scripts, which were intended to be rooted in horror as opposed to the action adventure nature of the studio's previous remakes. The Mummy introduced its ancient titular monster (played by Sofia Boutella), alongside the heroic character portrayed by Tom Cruise whose adventures as a monster were intended to expand upon in later installments. Prior to the film's release, additional cast officially joined the franchise as announced by Universal Pictures. The studio revealed a slate of films, but following the poor critical reception and underwhelming box office performance of The Mummy (2017), Universal cancelled pre-production that had begun on Bride of Frankenstein which was to be the next film in the franchise, and postponed all plans for the Dark Universe slate of films.

In January 2018, the production studio began reconfiguring their approach to the Universal Monsters, and following the departures of Kurtzman and Morgan from their roles as co-architects of the franchise, the studio decided to abandon a shared cinematic universe in favor of returning to standalone adaptations of the characters instead. After previously expressing interest in working with Universal Pictures on relaunching the characters for modern audiences, Jason Blum officially signed on to collaborate on a number of the projects in development. The producer later stated in 2020 that control of the Dark Universe and the Universal Monsters remains under the direction of Universal Pictures.

== Films ==
=== Classic era (1913–1956) ===
Film	U.S. release date	Director	Screenwriter(s)	Story by	Producer(s)	Ref(s)
Dr. Jekyll and Mr. Hyde	March 6, 1913	Herbert Brenon	Herbert Brenon	Herbert Brenon	Carl Laemmle	
The Hunchback of Notre Dame	September 2, 1923	Wallace Worsley	Edward T. Lowe Jr. & Perley Poore Sheehan	Edward T. Lowe Jr. & Perley Poore Sheehan	Carl Laemmle	
The Phantom of the Opera	September 6, 1925	Rupert Julian	Walter Anthony, Elliott J. Clawson, Bernard McConville, Frank M. McCormack, Tom Reed, Raymond L. Schrock, Jasper Spearing & Richard Wallace		Carl Laemmle	
Dracula	February 14, 1931	Tod Browning	Garrett Fort	Garrett Fort	Tod Browning and Carl Laemmle, Jr.	
Drácula	April 24, 1931	George Melford	Baltasar Fernández Cué and Garrett Fort	Garrett Fort	Carl Laemmle Jr. and Paul Kohner	
Frankenstein	November 21, 1931	James Whale	Francis Edward Faragoh & Garrett Fort	John L. Balderston	Carl Laemmle Jr.	
The Mummy	December 22, 1932	Karl Freund	John L. Balderston	Nina Wilcox Putnam & Richard Schayer	Carl Laemmle Jr.	
The Invisible Man	November 13, 1933	James Whale	R. C. Sherriff	R. C. Sherriff	Carl Laemmle Jr.	
Bride of Frankenstein	April 22, 1935	James Whale	William Hurlbut	William Hurlbut & John L. Balderston	Carl Laemmle Jr.	
Werewolf of London	May 13, 1935	Stuart Walker	John Colton, Robert Harris, Harvey Gates, Edmund Pearson, James Mulhauser & Aben Kandel	Robert Harris	Stanley Bergerman	
Dracula's Daughter	May 11, 1936	Lambert Hillyer	Garrett Fort	Oliver Jeffries	E. M. Asher	
Son of Frankenstein	January 13, 1939	Rowland V. Lee	Wyllis Cooper	Wyllis Cooper	Rowland V. Lee	
The Invisible Man Returns	January 12, 1940	Joe May	Curt Siodmak & Lester K. Cole	Curt Siodmak & Joe May	Ken Goldsmith	
The Mummy's Hand	September 20, 1940	Christy Cabanne	Griffin Jay and Maxwell Shane	Griffin Jay and Maxwell Shane	Ben Pivar	
The Invisible Woman	December 27, 1940	A. Edward Sutherland	Robert Lees, Frederic I. Rinaldo & Gertrude Purcell	Curt Siodmak & Joe May	Burt Kelly	
The Wolf Man	December 12, 1941	George Waggner	Curt Siodmak	Curt Siodmak	George Waggner	
The Ghost of Frankenstein	March 6, 1942	Erle C. Kenton	William Scott Darling	Eric Taylor	George Waggner	
Invisible Agent	July 31, 1942	Edwin L. Marin	Curt Siodmak	Curt Siodmak	Frank Lloyd	
The Mummy's Tomb	October 23, 1942	Harold Young	Griffin Jay & Henry Sucher	Neil P. Varnick	Ben Pivar	
Frankenstein Meets the Wolf Man	March 5, 1943	Roy William Neill	Curt Siodmak	Curt Siodmak	George Waggner	
Phantom of the Opera	August 12, 1943	Arthur Lubin	Samuel Hoffenstein & Eric Taylor	John Jacoby	George Waggner	
Son of Dracula	November 5, 1943	Robert Siodmak	Eric Taylor	Curt Siodmak	Ford Beebe and Donald H. Brown	
The Invisible Man's Revenge	June 9, 1944	Ford Beebe	Bertram Millhauser	Bertram Millhauser	Ford Beebe	
The Mummy's Ghost	June 30, 1944	Reginald LeBorg	Griffin Jay, Henry Sucher & Brenda Weisberg	Griffin Jay & Henry Sucher	Ben Pivar	
House of Frankenstein	December 15, 1944	Erle C. Kenton	Edward T. Lowe Jr.	Curt Siodmak	Paul Malvern	
The Mummy's Curse	December 22, 1944	Leslie Goodwins	Bernard Schubert	Leon Abrams & Dwight V. Babcock	Oliver Drake	
House of Dracula	December 7, 1945	Erle C. Kenton	Edward T. Lowe Jr.	Dwight V. Babcock & George Bricker	Paul Malvern	
She-Wolf of London	April 5, 1946	Jean Yarbrough	George Bricker	Dwight V. Babcock	Ben Pivar	
Abbott and Costello Meet Frankenstein	June 15, 1948	Charles T. Barton	Robert Lees, Frederic I. Rinaldo & John Grant	Robert Lees, Frederic I. Rinaldo & John Grant	Robert Arthur	
Abbott and Costello Meet the Invisible Man	April 3, 1951	Charles Lamont	Robert Lees, Frederic I. Rinaldo & John Grant	Hugh Wedlock Jr. & Howard Snyder	Howard Christie	
Abbott and Costello Meet Dr. Jekyll and Mr. Hyde	August 12, 1953	Charles Lamont	Lee Loeb & John Grant	Sidney Fields & Grant Garrett	Howard Christie	
Creature from the Black Lagoon	February 12, 1954	Jack Arnold	Harry Essex & Arthur Ross	Maurice Zimm	William Alland	
Revenge of the Creature	March 29, 1955	Jack Arnold	Martin Berkeley	William Alland	William Alland	
Abbott and Costello Meet the Mummy	June 23, 1955	Charles Lamont	John Grant	Lee Loeb	Howard Christie	
The Creature Walks Among Us	April 26, 1956	John Sherwood	Arthur Ross	Arthur Ross	William Alland	

=== Remakes and spin-off (1979–2010) ===
Film	U.S. release date	Director	Screenwriter(s)	Story by	Producers	Ref(s)
Dracula	July 13, 1979	John Badham	W. D. Richter	W. D. Richter	Marvin Mirisch and Walter Mirisch	
The Mummy	May 7, 1999	Stephen Sommers	Stephen Sommers	Stephen Sommers and Lloyd Fonvielle & Kevin Jarre	Sean Daniel and James Jacks	
The Mummy Returns	May 4, 2001	Stephen Sommers	Stephen Sommers	Stephen Sommers	Sean Daniel and James Jacks	
The Scorpion King	April 19, 2002	Chuck Russell	William Osborne & David Hayter and Stephen Sommers	Stephen Sommers & Jonathan Hales	Sean Daniel, James Jacks, Kevin Misher and Stephen Sommers	
Van Helsing	May 7, 2004	Stephen Sommers	Stephen Sommers	Stephen Sommers	Stephen Sommers and Bob Ducsay	
The Mummy: Tomb of the Dragon Emperor	August 1, 2008	Rob Cohen	Alfred Gough & Miles Millar	Alfred Gough & Miles Millar	Sean Daniel, James Jacks, Stephen Sommers and Bob Ducsay	
The Wolfman	February 12, 2010	Joe Johnston	Andrew Kevin Walker & David Self	Andrew Kevin Walker & David Self	Sean Daniel, Scott Stuber, Benicio del Toro and Rick Yorn	

=== Modern era ===
Film	U.S. release date	Director(s)	Screenwriter(s)	Story by	Producer(s)	Ref(s)
Dracula Untold	October 10, 2014	Gary Shore	Matt Sazama & Burk Sharpless	Matt Sazama & Burk Sharpless	Michael De Luca	
The Mummy	June 9, 2017	Alex Kurtzman	David Koepp and Christopher McQuarrie and Dylan Kussman	Jon Spaihts and Alex Kurtzman & Jenny Lumet	Alex Kurtzman, Chris Morgan, Sean Daniel and Sarah Bradshaw	
The Invisible Man	February 28, 2020	Leigh Whannell	Leigh Whannell	Leigh Whannell	Jason Blum and Kylie du Fresne	
Renfield	April 14, 2023	Chris McKay	Ryan Ridley	Robert Kirkman	Chris McKay, Samantha Nisenboim, Bryan Furst, Sean Furst, Robert Kirkman and David Alpert	
Abigail	April 19, 2024	Matt Bettinelli-Olpin & Tyler Gillett	Stephen Shields & Guy Busick	Stephen Shields & Guy Busick	William Sherak, James Vanderbilt, Paul Neinstein, Tripp Vinson and Chad Villella	
Wolf Man	January 17, 2025	Leigh Whannell	Leigh Whannell & Corbett Tuck and Lauren Schuker Blum & Rebecca Angelo		Jason Blum	
The Mummy: Book of the Dead	October 15, 2027	Matt Bettinelli-Olpin & Tyler Gillett	David Coggeshall	David Coggeshall	Sean Daniel, William Sherak, James Vanderbilt and Paul Neinstein	

==== Potential projects ====
- Dark Army: By September 2019, the film featuring monsters from the original films as well as new characters was in development. Paul Feig was attached as director, from a script of his own, and as co-producer with Laura Fischer. The project is a joint production between Universal Pictures and Feigco Productions. By October, Universal was reviewing his script as a reworking of the Dark Universe concept, while The Bride of Frankenstein is cited as a major influence. By February 2020, Feig was working on a second draft of the script upon receiving input from Universal Pictures. By that May, the filmmaker completed the newest draft while describing the tone as closer to the original films with horror elements, but a portrayal of the monsters as rejects. Feig had been given the option to develop films of any characters from the roster of monsters owned by Universal Pictures, prior to his chosen project.
- Frankenstein: Originally announced in June 2017, the project was initially planned as a part of the abandoned shared universe films with Javier Bardem cast to portray the titular character, and following the studio's standalone approach James Wan signed on as producer in November 2019. Jason Blum expressed interest in joining the production in a producing role. Robbie Thompson was hired as screenwriter in 2020, while the plot is said to center around a group of teenagers who discover that a neighbor is creating a monster in their basement. The project is a joint production between Universal Pictures and Atomic Monster.
- The Invisible Woman: In November 2019, a reboot of The Invisible Woman was revealed to be in development. Elizabeth Banks was attached to star in, and direct the film, from a script written by Erin Cressida Wilson which was based on an original story written by Banks, also serving as a producer with Max Handelman. Banks was given options to develop a film from any characters in the roster of monsters owned by Universal Pictures, while she chose the Invisible Woman.
- Monster Mash: In February 2020, a musical titled after and centered around the novelty song "Monster Mash" was revealed to be in development. Grammy Award nominee Matt Stawski was hired as a director, with Will Widger as screenwriter (from an original story written by Stawski), while Marty Bowen was put as producer. The project is a joint-venture production between Universal Pictures and Temple Hill Entertainment.
- Untitled Dracula film: In February 2021, Chloé Zhao was hired to write and direct a futuristic sci-fi Western film centered around Dracula. The filmmaker stated that she was continuing to work on the script in March of 2023.
- Little Monsters: In July 2020, Josh Cooley was hired as both writer and director, with a story centering around the characters from the Universal Monsters, inspired and based on drawings of the monster characters made by Crash McCreery who would be given an executive producer credit. The project was intended to serve as a "love letter to classic Hollywood and the history of film-making with a story that takes a multi-generational approach to the monsters and a more PG-rated, lighthearted family-friendly tone in the tradition of the classic '80s Spielberg films from Amblin Entertainment to match as well". The film was said to be a live-action/CGI hybrid, with Todd Lieberman and David Hoberman attached as producers. The project would be a joint production between Universal Pictures and Mandeville Films.
- Untitled Invisible Man sequel: In February 2020, Leigh Whannell stated that though The Invisible Man (2020) was developed as a standalone film, he considered to make a follow-up to this film. Whannell was working on writing the story that July. By April 2024, Elisabeth Moss began working with Blumhouse through her production company Love & Squalor Pictures to develop a sequel. In January 2025, Whannell said that he will not be involved with a sequel, while expressing being content with the first film's story. By October 2025, the script was still being written.
- Bride of Frankenstein: Initially planned as a part of the abandoned shared universe films, the studio continued development after shelving all projects associated with the Dark Universe. In February 2020, Universal hired Amy Pascal as producer on a new standalone adaptation of the character where the producer discussed rehiring David Koepp who had worked on the previous drafts of the script. After initially discussing the project with Sam Raimi who passed on the opportunity, Pascal began working on the film with John Krasinski. The project is intended to be a joint-venture production between Universal Pictures, Pascal Pictures, and Sunday Night Productions.
- Untitled Scorpion King reboot: A reboot of The Scorpion King film series was in development since November 2020. Jonathan Herman was hired as screenwriter, with the plot taking place during modern-day and involving a contemporary adaptation of Mathayus of Akkad / Scorpion King. Dwayne Johnson, who started his acting career as the titular role in The Mummy Returns, was attached as producer alongside Dany Garcia and Hiram Garcia. The project is a joint-venture production between Universal Pictures and Seven Bucks Productions.
- Untitled film: An untitled project was announced in November 2020, with Channing Tatum tentatively attached to star. Wes Tooke was hired as a screenwriter, from a story written by Reid Carolin, while Phil Lord and Christopher Miller were attached as producers alongside Tatum, Carolin, Peter Kiernan, and Aditya Sood. The plot is described as "a modern-day, tongue-in-cheek thriller", while being "a bold genre reinvention of one of the studio's most beloved characters from the Monsters Universe". The project is a joint-venture production between Universal Pictures, Lord Miller Productions, and Free Association Productions.
- Van Helsing: Originally announced in 2015, the project was originally planned as a part of the abandoned shared universe films, though the project had re-entered development in December 2020. Julius Avery was hired to direct, from a script based on a previous draft by Eric Pearson. James Wan was set to produce, with the project intended to be a joint-production between Universal Pictures and Atomic Monster.
- Phantom: After previously attempting an adaptation that was planned as a part of the abandoned shared universe films, Universal purchased a speculative screenplay in December 2021, written by John Fusco which functions as a modern-day reboot of The Phantom of the Opera. The writer authored the script while working on his own record albums while in self-isolation during the COVID-19 pandemic. Fusco determined to write a script that would be a musical, and be set in the French Quarter, Vieux Carré area of New Orleans in the United States. Incorporating aspects of rhythm and blues, jazz, neo-soul, and funk, the story is said to utilize French Creole nightlife culture of the geographical area, including voodoo and Mardi Gras, as well as the romance and mystery aspects of the original film. Harvey Mason Jr., John Legend, and Mike Jackson signed onto the project as producers, with the project being a joint-venture production between Universal Pictures, Harvey Mason Media, and Get Lifted Film Co. in a collaborative effort.
- The Creature from the Black Lagoon: Universal attempted various incarnations of producing a remake centered around the titular Gill-man throughout a number of decades (beginning as early as 1982), with various filmmakers attached at different times including: John Landis, John Carpenter, Peter Jackson, Ivan Reitman, Guillermo del Toro, and Breck Eisner. Some time in 2004, James Gunn pitched an adaptation of the character but the studio passed on adapting the script, while del Toro later repurposed his material for another unrelated project. Beginning in June 2017, the project was planned as a part of the abandoned shared universe films. By August 2024, the modern-day adaption was once again in development and James Wan was hired as producer in addition to being in early discussions to serve as director. By September, Sean Tretta was hired to write the script, which is based on an original story co-authored by Wan, Rafael Jordan, and Bryan Coyne. The project is a joint-venture production between Universal Pictures, and the newly-merged Atomic Monster and Blumhouse Productions.

==== Cancelled and repurposed projects ====
- Dark Universe: In development as early as October 2013, the series of films was intended to relaunch the Universal Monsters characters, through a format similar to the Marvel Cinematic Universe and DC Extended Universe. The projects were officially announced in July 2014, as Universal hired Chris Morgan and Alex Kurtzman to oversee the development of the rebooted modern-day versions of the Universal Monsters, with the duo's first involvements beginning with additional photography scenes filmed for Dracula Untold (2014) which positioned the characters of the film in modern-day. After the film underperformed its connections to the Dark Universe were downplayed, with The Mummy (2017) repositioned as the official start of the new film series. In May 2017, the slate of reimagined incarnations of titular monsters was officially titled, by the studio through a press conference including official logo, website, trailer video, and scored theme music composed by Danny Elfman. Universal Pictures worked with Kurtzman and Morgan to create a writer's room of various contributors to create stories that were to be expanded into scripts, where the films were intended to have horror as their primary genre, as opposed to the action adventure nature of the studio's previous remakes. The Mummy introduced its ancient titular monster (played by Sofia Boutella), alongside the heroic character-turned monster portrayed by Tom Cruise whose monstrous origins depicted in the film were intended to be expanded upon in later installments. Prior to the film's release, Universal Pictures announced the additional main cast of additional characters for the intended series alongside Cruise, including Russell Crowe as Dr. Henry Jekyll / Mr. Edward Hyde, Johnny Depp as Dr. Griffin / the Invisible Man, and Javier Bardem as the Frankenstein Monster. Following poor critical reception and an underwhelming box office performance of The Mummy (2017), Universal postponed all plans for the Dark Universe slate of films. In January 2018, the production studio began reconfiguring their approach to the Universal Monsters, and following the departures of Kurtzman and Morgan from their roles as co-architects of the franchise, the studio abandoned the planned shared cinematic universe in favor of individualized standalone adaptations of the monsters. Years later, Universal revived the "Dark Universe" brand name for a Universal Monsters–themed land at its new Universal Epic Universe park at Universal Orlando. The studio had revealed an official slate of films including:

- Frankenstein: Javier Bardem was cast in the role of Frankenstein's Monster in May 2017, while the character was intended to initially debut in Bride of Frankenstein before starring in his own film.
- Wolf Man: With a script developed by Aaron Guzikowski, the studio had been interested in casting Dwayne Johnson in the titular role.
- Bride of Frankenstein: The project was announced in May 2017, and was intended to be directed by Bill Condon with a script written by David Koepp, with a February 14, 2019 release date. Angelina Jolie was in negotiations with the studio to star in the lead role, before the film was delayed and removed from its scheduled release in October.
- Dracula: By June 2017, a feature film titled and centered around the titular vampire was planned as a part of the Dark Universe franchise.
- Creature from the Black Lagoon: A feature film centered around the character was initially in development as a part of the planned slate of films. Will Beall was hired to write the script, while the studio considered Scarlett Johansson for a role in the film.
- The Invisible Man: Announced initially in February 2016 with Ed Solomon writing the script, Johnny Depp was cast to star in the lead role.
- Phantom of the Opera: By June 2017, a feature film centered around the titular character was planned as a part of the Dark Universe franchise.
- Hunchback of Notre Dame: Alex Kurtzman announced developments for a Dark Universe film centered around the titular monster in June 2017.
- Van Helsing: Development began on the project as early as June 2012, when Alex Kurtzman worked on the first draft of script, taking inspiration from The Dark Knight as an influence. By July 2016, Eric Heisserer and Jon Spaihts were hired to collaborate on a new draft of the script, where the co-authors looked towards the lead character of the Mad Max franchise for further inspiration. The studio had been courting Channing Tatum to star in the lead role, after Tom Cruise had initially been considered to play the character prior to being cast his starring role in The Mummy (2017) instead.
- Dr. Jekyll and Mr. Hyde: In June 2017, Alex Kurtzman confirmed plans for a feature film centered around the titular character.

- Untitled Mina Harker film: By March 2020, Karyn Kusama was hired to direct a film centered around Dracula, from a script co-written by Matt Manfredi and Phil Hay. The project was to be a joint-venture production, with Blumhouse Productions serving as the production studio. The film has been described to be a "faithful adaptation" of Bram Stoker's Dracula, including a plot told from multiple perspectives. The film was intended to take place in modern-day Los Angeles with the working title Mina Harker. Jasmine Cephas Jones was cast to play Mina Harker while Dracula would have used the alias of Vladimir, but in April 2022, three weeks prior to its principal photography start date, the project was cancelled by the associated studios due to creative differences with Kusama. At the time that it was shelved, Miramax had been intended to be one of the associated production studios.

== Main cast and characters ==
This table includes the Universal Monster characters and their respective actors for each film in the franchise. Additional characters include recurring primary characters of the Universal Studios Monsters franchise.

Character	Classic era				Remakes & spin-offs	Modern era
Character	1910s-1920s	1930s	1940s	1950s	Remakes & spin-offs	Modern era
Dr. Henry Jekyll Mr. Edward Hyde	King Baggot (Note: Baggot portrayed the character in the silent film, Dr. Jekyll and Mr. Hyde (1913).)			Boris Karloff & Eddie Parker (Note: Karloff portrayed Jekyll, while Parker portrayed Hyde in Abbott and Costello Meet Dr. Jekyll and Mr. Hyde (1953).)	Stephen Fisher & Robbie Coltrane (Note: Fisher portrayed Jekyll, while Coltrane voiced a CGI-created Hyde in Van Helsing (2004).)	Russell Crowe (Note: Crowe portrayed the character in The Mummy (2017).)
Quasimodo The Hunchback of Notre Dame	Lon Chaney (Note: Chaney portrayed the character in the silent film, The Hunchback of Notre Dame (1923).)					
The Phantom of the Opera	Lon Chaney (Note: Chaney portrayed the character in the silent film, The Phantom of the Opera (1925) where the character is named Erik.)		Claude Rains (Note: Rains portrayed the character in the remake, Phantom of the Opera (1943) where the character is named Erique Claudin.)			
Count Dracula		Bela Lugosi (Note: Lugosi portrayed the character in Dracula (1931).) Carlos Villar (Note: Villar portrayed the character in the Spanish-language version of the film, Drácula (1931) where the character is named Conde Drácula.)	John Carradine (Note: Carradine portrayed the character in House of Frankenstein (1944), and House of Dracula (1945).) Bela Lugosi (Note: Lugosi reprised the role in Abbott and Costello Meet Frankenstein (1948).)		Frank Langella (Note: Langella portrayed the character in the remake of the 1931 original, Dracula (1979 film).) Richard Roxburgh (Note: Roxburgh portrayed the character in Van Helsing (2004), where the character is named Count Vladislaus Dracula.)	Luke Evans (Note: Evans portrayed the character in Dracula Untold (2014), where the character is depicted as the historical figure Vlad III "the Impaler" Dracula in an origin story.) Nicolas Cage (Note: Cage portrayed the character in Renfield (2023).)
Brides of Dracula		Geraldine Dvorak, Cornelia Thaw, & Dorothy Tree (Note: The actresses (Dvorak, Thaw, and Tree) portrayed the characters in Dracula (1931).) Uncredited actresses (Note: A trio of uncredited actresses portrayed the characters in the Spanish-language version of the film Drácula (1931).)			Silvia Colloca, Elena Anaya, & Josie Maran (Note: The actresses (Anaya, Colloca, and Maran) portrayed the characters in Van Helsing (2004), where the characters are named Verona, Aleera, and Marishka, respectively.)	
Robert Montague "R. M." Renfield		Dwight Frye (Note: Frye portrayed the character in Dracula (1931).) Pablo Álvarez Rubio (Note: Rubio portrayed the character in the Spanish-language version of the film, Drácula (1931).)			Tony Haygarth (Note: Haygarth portrayed the character in Dracula (1979), where the character is named Milo Renfield.)	Nicholas Hoult (Note: Hoult portrayed the character in Renfield (2023).)
Prof. Van Helsing		Edward Van Sloan (Note: Van Sloan portrayed the character in Dracula (1931), and Dracula's Daughter (1936).) Eduardo Arozamena (Note: Arozamena portrayed the character in Spanish-language version of the film, Drácula (1931).)			Laurence Olivier (Note: Olivier portrayed the character in Dracula (1979).) Hugh Jackman (Note: Jackman portrayed the character in Van Helsing (2004), where the character is named Gabriel Van Helsing.)	
Frankenstein's Monster		Boris Karloff (Note: Karloff portrayed the character in Frankenstein (1931), The Bride of Frankenstein (1935), and Son of Frankenstein (1939).)	Lon Chaney Jr. (Note: Chaney Jr. portrayed the character in The Ghost of Frankenstein (1942).) Bela Lugosi (Note: Lugosi portrayed the character in Frankenstein Meets the Wolf Man (1943).) Glenn Strange (Note: Strange portrayed the character in House of Frankenstein (1944), House of Dracula (1945), and Abbott and Costello Meet Frankenstein (1948).)		Shuler Hensley (Note: Hensley portrayed the character in Van Helsing (2004).)	
Dr. Heinrich "Henry" von Frankenstein		Colin Clive (Note: Clive portrayed the character in Frankenstein (1931), and The Bride of Frankenstein (1935), while the actor's likeness was used for reference on the oil painting familial portrait in Son of Frankenstein (1939).)	Cedric Hardwicke (Note: Hardwicke portrays the ghostly apparition of the character during a hallucination sequence in The Ghost of Frankenstein (1942).)		Samuel West (Note: West portrayed the character in Van Helsing (2004).)	
Imhotep The Mummy		Boris Karloff (Note: Karloff portrayed the character in The Mummy (1932).)			Arnold Vosloo (Note: Vosloo portrayed the character in The Mummy (1999), and The Mummy Returns (2001).)	Sofia Boutella (Note: Boutella portrayed the character in The Mummy (2017), where the character is named Ahmanet.)
Dr. Jack Griffin The Invisible Man		Claude Rains (Note: Rains portrayed the character in The Invisible Man (1933).)	Referenced	Referenced		Oliver Jackson-Cohen (Note: Jackson-Cohen portrayed the character in The Invisible Man (2020), where the character is named Adrian Griffin.)
Bride of Frankenstein		Elsa Lanchester (Note: Lanchester portrayed the character in The Bride of Frankenstein (1935).)				
Dr. Wilfred Glenn Werewolf of London		Henry Hull (Note: Hull portrayed the character in Werewolf of London (1935).)				
Countess Marya Zaleska Dracula's Daughter		Gloria Holden (Note: Holden portrayed the character in Dracula's Daughter (1936).)				
Ygor		Bela Lugosi (Note: Lugosi portrayed the character in Son of Frankenstein (1939), and The Ghost of Frankenstein (1942).)	Bela Lugosi		Kevin J. O'Connor (Note: O'Connor portrayed the character in Van Helsing (2004).)	
Geoffrey Radcliffe The Invisible Man			Vincent Price (Note: Price portrayed the character in The Invisible Man Returns (1940); he later reprised the role in Abbott and Costello Meet Frankenstein (1948).)			
Kharis The Mummy			Tom Tyler (Note: Tyler portrayed the character in The Mummy's Hand (1940).) Lon Chaney Jr. (Note: Chaney Jr. portrayed the character in The Mummy's Tomb (1942), The Mummy's Ghost (1944), and The Mummy's Curse (1944).)			
Kitty Carol The Invisible Woman			Virginia Bruce (Note: Bruce portrayed the character in The Invisible Woman (1940).)			
Lawrence "Larry" Talbot The Wolf Man			Lon Chaney Jr. (Note: Chaney Jr. portrayed the character in The Wolf Man (1941), Frankenstein Meets the Wolf Man (1943), House of Frankenstein (1944), House of Dracula (1945), and Abbott and Costello Meet Frankenstein (1948).)		Will Kemp (Note: Kemp portrayed the character in Van Helsing (2004), where the character is named Velkan Valerious.) Benicio del Toro (Note: del Toro portrayed the character in The Wolfman (2010).)	Christopher Abbott (Note: Abbott portrayed the character in Wolf Man (2025), where the character is named Blake Lovell.)
Frank "Raymond" Griffin The Invisible Man			Jon Hall (Note: Hall portrayed the character in Invisible Agent (1942).)			
Count Alucard Son of Dracula			Lon Chaney Jr. (Note: Chaney Jr. portrayed the character in Son of Dracula (1943).)			
Robert Griffin The Invisible Man			Jon Hall (Note: Hall played another character in The Invisible Man's Revenge (1944).)			
Phyllis Allenby She-Wolf of London			June Lockhart (Note: Lockhart portrayed the character in She-Wolf of London (1946).)			
Tommy Nelson The Invisible Man				Arthur Franz (Note: Franz portrayed the character in Abbott and Costello Meet the Invisible Man (1951).)		
Gill-Man The Creature				Ben Chapman (Note: Chapman portrayed the character in Creature from the Black Lagoon (1954), while Browning served as underwater stunt double.) Ricou Browning (Note: Browning served as the underwater performer for the Creature in Creature from the Black Lagoon (1954), Revenge of the Creature (1955), and The Creature Walks Among Us (1956).) Tom Hennesy (Note: Hennesy portrayed the character in Revenge of the Creature (1955), while Browning once again served as the underwater stunt double.) Don Megowan (Note: Megowan portrayed the character in The Creature Walks Among Us (1956), while Browning again served as the underwater stunt double.)		
Klaris The Mummy				Eddie Parker (Note: Parker portrayed the character in Abbott and Costello Meet the Mummy (1955).)		
Mathayus of Akkad The Scorpion King					Dwayne Johnson (Note: Johnson portrayed the character in The Mummy Returns (2001), and The Scorpion King (2002).) Michael Copon (Note: Copon portrayed the character in The Scorpion King 2: Rise of a Warrior (2008), while Pierre Marais featured as the character at a younger age.) Victor Webster (Note: Webster portrayed the character in The Scorpion King 3: Battle for Redemption (2012), and The Scorpion King 4: Quest for Power (2015).) Zach McGowan (Note: McGowan portrayed the character in The Scorpion King: Book of Souls (2018).)	
Han the Dragon Emperor The Mummy					Jet Li (Note: Li portrayed the character in The Mummy: Tomb of the Dragon Emperor (2008).)	

== Television ==
Series	Season(s)	Episodes	Originally released			Creator(s)	Executive producer	Status
Series	Season(s)	Episodes	First released	Last released	Network	Creator(s)	Executive producer	Status
Monster Force	1	13	April 9, 1994	July 16, 1994	Syndication	Marv Wolfman	Sheldon S. Wiseman	Ended
The Mummy: The Animated Series	2	26	September 29, 2001	June 7, 2003	Kids' WB	Stephen Sommers and Thomas Pugsley & Greg Klein	Stephen Sommers	Ended

=== Monster Force (1994) ===
Created by comic book author and artist Marv Wolfman, in collaboration with Universal Cartoon Studios, the show was developed to reintroduce the Universal Monsters to child audiences. The plot centers around a group of college-age students and their professor Dr. Reed Crawley to form a squad call the Monster Force, who through the use of some supernatural skills and technological weaponry must combat Dracula and his army called the Creatures of the Night. The series aired through broadcast syndication from April to July 1994. With mild viewership, the show was canceled after its first season.

=== The Mummy: The Animated Series (2001–2003) ===
Created by Stephen Sommers in collaboration with Thomas Pugsley and Greg Klein, the show is an animated adaptation of the film series which had starred Brendan Fraser. The television show centers around Imhotep / The Mummy, while following the adventures of Rick O'Connell and his family. Featuring the voices of Jim Cummings, John Schneider, Chris Marquette, Grey DeLisle, and an ensemble of supporting cast, the show was marketed towards younger audiences through Universal Cartoon Studios. Airing on The WB through the Kids' WB! programming block from September 2001 to June 2003, the show received critical acclaim while some critics called the release superior to the feature-length sequels to the live-action 1999 film.

== Direct-to-video films ==
Following the financial successes of The Mummy Returns (2001) and its prequel The Scorpion King (2002), a series of Scorpion King films were produced and distributed straight-to-home video through Universal Pictures Home Entertainment.

Film	U.S. release date	Director	Screenwriter(s)	Story by	Producer(s)	Ref(s)
The Scorpion King 2: Rise of a Warrior	August 19, 2008	Russell Mulcahy	Randall McCormick	Randall McCormick	Sean Daniel and James Jacks	
The Scorpion King 3: Battle for Redemption	January 10, 2012	Roel Reiné	Brendan Cowles & Shane Kuhn	Randall McCormick	Leslie Belzberg	
The Scorpion King 4: Quest for Power	January 6, 2015	Mike Elliott	Michael D. Weiss	Michael D. Weiss	Mike Elliott and Ogden Gavanski	
The Scorpion King: Book of Souls	October 23, 2018	Don Michael Paul	David Alton Hedges & Frank DeJohn	David Alton Hedges & Frank DeJohn	Mike Elliott	

== Short films ==
Film	U.S. release date	Director(s)	Screenwriter(s)	Producer
Abbott and Costello Meet the Creature from the Black Lagoon	February 21, 1954	Sid Smith & Edward Sobol	John Grant and Hugh Wedlock Jr. & Howard Snyder	Edward Sobol
Van Helsing: The London Assignment	May 11, 2004	Sharon Bridgeman	Garfield Reeves-Stevens & Judith Reeves-Stevens	John Kafka

=== Abbott and Costello Meet the Creature from the Black Lagoon (1954) ===
Developed in collaboration with Colgate-Palmolive-Peet, the short was released during The Colgate Comedy Hour as a live-television comedy sketch created to introduce audiences to The Creature from the Black Lagoon. Continuing the trend with previous installments where Bud Abbott and Lou Costello meet the Universal Monsters, the short follows a plot where the two actors explore the studio's prop room which references some of their previous interactions with the various characters, while encountering the Invisible Man, Frankenstein's Monster (Glenn Strange), and the Gill-Man (Ben Chapman).

=== Van Helsing: The London Assignment (2004) ===
Developed as an anime-styled prologue to the 2004 feature-length film, the short was directed by Sharon Bridgeman from a script written by Garfield and Judith Reeves-Stevens. The plot takes place immediately before the live-action film and follows Gabriel Van Helsing's investigation in the grisly murders plaguing Victorian era London, and his discovery of a monstrous killer named Mr. Hyde. Marketed as the prequel to the theatrical release, it was produced for the straight-to-home video market by Universal and was received with mixed reception.

== Other media ==
=== Home video collections ===
The franchise has received a variety of home video packing boxsets including: The Classic Collection (1991–1994), the Classic Monster Collection (1999), The Legacy Collection (2004), the Essential Collection (2012), and the Complete Collection (2018).

Universal Monsters films
Year	Title	The Classic Collection (1991–94)	Classic Monster Collection (1999)	The Legacy Collection (2004)	Essential Collection (2012)	Complete Collection (2018)	Ref(s)
1931	Dracula	Yes	Yes	Yes	Yes	Yes	
1931	Dracula (Spanish)	Yes	Yes	Yes	Yes	Yes	
1931	Frankenstein	Yes	Yes	Yes	Yes	Yes	
1932	Murders in the Rue Morgue	Yes	No	No	No	No	
1932	The Mummy	Yes	Yes	Yes	Yes	Yes	
1932	Island of Lost Souls (Note: Although originally produced and released by Paramount Pictures, MCA Inc. obtained the rights to the film in 1958 and acquired Universal in 1962 and branded it with Universal Studios Monsters in its 1991 home video release.)	Yes	No	No	No	No	
1933	The Invisible Man	Yes	Yes	Yes	Yes	Yes	
1934	The Black Cat	Yes	No	No	No	No	
1935	The Bride of Frankenstein	Yes	Yes	Yes	Yes	Yes	
1935	Werewolf of London	Yes	No	Yes	No	Yes	
1935	The Raven	Yes	No	No	No	No	
1936	Dracula's Daughter	Yes	No	Yes	No	Yes	
1939	Son of Frankenstein	Yes	No	Yes	No	Yes	
1939	Tower of London	Yes	No	No	No	No	
1940	The Invisible Man Returns	Yes	No	Yes	No	Yes	
1940	The Mummy's Hand	Yes	No	Yes	No	Yes	
1940	The Invisible Woman	Yes	No	Yes	No	Yes	
1941	The Monster and the Girl	Yes	No	No	No	No	
1941	Man-Made Monster	Yes	No	No	No	No	
1941	The Wolf Man	Yes	Yes	Yes	Yes	Yes	
1942	The Ghost of Frankenstein	Yes	No	Yes	No	Yes	
1942	Invisible Agent	Yes	No	Yes	No	Yes	
1942	The Mummy's Tomb	Yes	No	Yes	No	Yes	
1943	Frankenstein Meets the Wolf Man	Yes	No	Yes	No	Yes	
1943	Captive Wild Woman	Yes	No	No	No	No	
1943	Phantom of the Opera	Yes	Yes	No	Yes	Yes	
1943	Son of Dracula	Yes	No	Yes	No	Yes	
1943	The Mad Ghoul	Yes	No	No	No	No	
1944	The Invisible Man's Revenge	Yes	No	Yes	No	Yes	
1944	The Mummy's Ghost	Yes	No	Yes	No	Yes	
1944	House of Frankenstein	Yes	No	Yes	No	Yes	
1944	The Mummy's Curse	Yes	No	Yes	No	Yes	
1945	House of Dracula	Yes	No	Yes	No	Yes	
1946	House of Horrors	Yes	No	No	No	No	
1946	She-Wolf of London	No	No	Yes	No	Yes	
1948	Abbott and Costello Meet Frankenstein	No	No	No	No	Yes	
1951	Abbott and Costello Meet the Invisible Man	No	No	No	No	Yes	
1954	Creature from the Black Lagoon	Yes	Yes	Yes	Yes	Yes	
1955	Revenge of the Creature	Yes	No	Yes	No	Yes	
1955	Abbott and Costello Meet the Mummy	No	No	No	No	Yes	
1956	The Creature Walks Among Us	Yes	No	Yes	No	Yes	

=== Literature ===
Universal Pictures collaborated with a number of publishing companies to produce a variety mediums of literature, featuring the Universal Monsters characters, including novels, young adult fiction, graphic novels, comic books, and limited series.

==== Novels ====
Universal Monsters novels
Title	Author	Publication date	Publisher	Notes	Ref(s)
Return of the Wolfman	Jeff Rovin	October 1, 1998	Berkley Boulevard Books	—N/a	
Universal Monsters – Dracula: Return of Evil	Larry Mike Garmon	January 1, 2001	Scholastic, Incorporated	Part of Larry Mike Garmon's Universal Monsters series	
Universal Monsters – The Wolf Man: Blood Moon Rising	Larry Mike Garmon	January 1, 2001	Scholastic, Incorporated	Part of Larry Mike Garmon's Universal Monsters series	
Universal Monsters – Frankenstein: Anatomy of Terror	Larry Mike Garmon	January 1, 2001	Scholastic, Incorporated	Part of Larry Mike Garmon's Universal Monsters series	
Universal Monsters – Creature from the Black Lagoon: Blackwater Horror	Larry Mike Garmon	January 1, 2002	Scholastic, Incorporated	Part of Larry Mike Garmon's Universal Monsters series	
Universal Monsters – The Mummy: Book of the Dead	Larry Mike Garmon	February 1, 2002	Scholastic, Incorporated	Part of Larry Mike Garmon's Universal Monsters series	
Universal Monsters – Bride of Frankenstein: Vow of Vengeance	Larry Mike Garmon	September 1, 2002	Scholastic, Incorporated	Part of Larry Mike Garmon's Universal Monsters series	
Dracula: Asylum	Paul Witcover	February 22, 2006	Dark Horse Comics	—N/a	
Frankenstein: The Shadow of Frankenstein	Stefan Petrucha	August 15, 2006	Dark Horse Comics	—N/a	
Creature from the Black Lagoon: Time's Black Lagoon	Paul Di Filippo	September 19, 2006	Dark Horse Comics	—N/a	
The Wolf Man: Hunter's Moon	Michael Jan Friedman	October 16, 2007	Dark Horse Comics	—N/a	
The Mummy: Dark Resurrection	Michael Paine	November 13, 2007	Dark Horse Comics	—N/a	
The Bride of Frankenstein: Pandora's Bride	Elizabeth Hand	December 25, 2007	Dark Horse Comics	—N/a	

==== Comics ====
===== Dark Horse Comics (1993–2006) =====
Dark Horse Comics series
Title	Writer	Penciller	Inker	Colorist	Letterer	Editor	Designer	Publication date	Ref(s)
Universal Monsters: Frankenstein	Denis Beauvais				N/A	Dan Thorsland	Scott Tice	May 1, 1993	
Universal Monsters: Creature from the Black Lagoon	Steve Moncuse	Arthur Adams	Terry Austin	Matt Hollingsworth	Lois Buhalis	Dan Thorsland	Scott Tice	August 1, 1993	
Universal Monsters: Dracula	Dan Vado	Jonathan D. Smith			Clem Robins	Dan Thorsland	Scott Tice	October 1, 1993	
Universal Monsters: The Mummy	Dan Jolley	Tony Harris		Matt Hollingsworth	Lois Buhalis	Dan Thorsland	Scott Tice	November 1, 1993	
Universal Monsters: Cavalcade of Horror								January 11, 2006	

===== Skybound Entertainment (2023–present) =====
Skybound Entertainment series
Writer	Penciller	Colorist	Letterer	Editor	Designer	Premiere date	Finale date	Ref(s)
Universal Monsters: Dracula
James Tynion IV	Martin Simmonds		Rus Wooton	Alex Antone	Jillian Crab	October 25, 2023	January 24, 2024	
Universal Monsters: Creature from the Black Lagoon Lives!
Ram V Dan Watters	Matthew Roberts	Dave Stewart (#1–2); Trish Mulvihill (#3–4)	D.C. Hopkins	Alex Antone	Jillian Crab	April 24, 2024	July 24, 2024	
Universal Monsters: Frankenstein
Michael Walsh		Toni-Marie Griffin	Becca Carey	Alex Antone	Jillian Crab	August 28, 2024	November 27, 2024	
Universal Monsters: The Mummy
Faith Erin Hicks		Lee Loughridge	Hassan Otsmane-Elhaou	Alex Antone	Jillian Crab	March 26, 2025	June 25, 2025	
Universal Monsters: The Invisible Man
James Tynion IV	Dani	Brad Simpson	Becca Carey	Alex Antone	Jillian Crab	August 27, 2025	November 26, 2025	
Universal Monsters: The Phantom of the Opera
Tyler Boss	Martin Simmonds		Becca Carey	Alex Antone	Jillian Crab	February 25, 2026	May 27, 2026	
Universal Monsters: Blood of the Wolf Man
Joshua Williamson	Leomacs	Pip Martin	D.C. Hopkins	Diegs Lopez	Jillian Crab	June 24, 2026	September 23, 2026	
Universal Monsters: The Bride of Frankenstein Lives
Kelly Thompson	Mattia De Iulis		Becca Carey	Alex Antone	Jillian Crab	October 28, 2026	January 27, 2027	

=== Theme park attractions ===
- Universal Monsters Live Rock and Roll Show: This live show has played under several different names across the Universal Parks & Resorts, and features several Universal Monsters alongside the title character of the horror-comedy film Beetlejuice.
- Universal's Halloween Horror Nights: Since 1991 at Universal Parks & Resorts the theme park attraction have featured characters from the Universal Classic Monsters franchise. From 2006 to 2014, the characters also appeared in the year-round walk-through attraction, Universal's House of Horrors, at Universal Studios Hollywood. The franchise is also the central theme of Universal's Horror Make-Up Show. The live show opened in 1990 at Universal Studios Florida and is still in operation.
- Revenge of the Mummy: The Ride: Opening in 2004 at Universal Studios Florida and Universal Studios Hollywood, the roller coaster with dark ride elements is based on the first two Mummy films of the remake era.
- Universal Epic Universe: A theme park attraction based on the concept and title of cancelled shared universe of films opened in May 2025, as a part of Universal Destinations & Experiences's planned expansion of the Orlando park location. Thematically inspired by each of its films, the park serves as a modern day follow-up to the original films, where attendees can explore a town named Darkmoor Village. This attraction features the great-great-granddaughter of Henry Frankenstein named Victoria, who has continued to follow in the mad scientist footsteps of her family and has begun creating monsters of her own. Visitors attending the park can see the events of a plot unfold, where her latest experiment which was intended to bring all of the Universal Monsters under her control backfires as a result of Dracula's revolt. The Dark Universe includes attractions, such as Monsters Unchained: The Frankenstein Experiment, locales from the films, a number of rides, and a combination of actors, animatronics, special effects, and cutting-edge technology that was developed for the park. The location includes Dracula, Frankenstein's Monster, Wolf Man, Bride of Frankenstein, Creature from the Black Lagoon, The Mummy, Invisible Man, and various others from the studio's films.
- Universal Horror Unleashed: A haunted house attraction featuring characters from the Universal Classic Monsters franchise opened on August 14, 2025.

== Influence on unrelated media ==
The Universal Monsters have been attributed with directly influencing the horror genre and its filmmakers in the decades that followed, as well as also retroactively adding additional depth to the source material for the characters. The popularity of the franchise inspired decades of horror films that followed, including leading to various unrelated media based on the characters and adapting in a variety of means.

- The Munsters franchise (1964–2022): A comedic sitcom formatted parody of horror, where a family of benign monsters navigate their existence among normal American experiences. Produced in collaboration with Universal Television, the franchise was able to employ the copyrighted designs of the Universal Monsters for the Munster family. Versions of Frankenstein's Monster, Count Dracula, the Gill-Man, Dr. Frankenstein, The Wolf Man, Phantom of the Opera, Bride of Frankenstein, and Dr. Jekyll / Mr. Hyde feature throughout its installments.
- Mad Monster Party? (1967): Developed by Rankin/Bass Productions Inc. as a stop-motion animated musical comedy, the adaptation features incarnations of Universal Monsters with distinct variations to avoid copyright, including: Dr. Frankenstein (voiced by Boris Karloff), Frankenstein's Monster, Bride of Frankenstein, Count Dracula, the Wolf Man, The Mummy, Dr. Jekyll / Mr. Hyde, Creature from the Black Lagoon, Hunchback of Notre-Dame, and Invisible Man among various other monster-themed characters. Directed by Jules Bass, with a script written by Len Korobkin and Harvey Kurtzman, based on an original story from Arthur Rankin Jr., the plot centers around Dr. Frankenstein's invitation for all monsters to attend a retirement celebration at Castle Frankenstein to name is successor. The feature-length film has been cited as a cult classic in the decades since its release.
- Young Frankenstein (1974): A horror comedy film directed by Mel Brooks, from a script he co-wrote with Gene Wilder, it is a parody of the Frankenstein films produced by Universal Pictures in the 1930s and 1940s, most notably Frankenstein (1931), Bride of Frankenstein (1935), Son of Frankenstein (1939) and The Ghost of Frankenstein (1942). Released by 20th Century Fox, the plot follows Dr. Fredrick Frankenstein (Wilder), the grandson of the infamous Victor Frankenstein, who distances himself from his Frankenstein lineage but eventually resumes his grandfather's experiments in reanimating the dead. To recreate the atmosphere of the original films, the film was shot entirely in black-and-white and even used the original lab equipment by Kenneth Strickfaden from the original 1931 film.
- Transylvania 6-5000 (1985): A horror comedy film written and directed by Rudy de Luca, and distributed by New World Pictures. The film follows two tabloid reporters who travel to modern-day Transylvania to investigate sightings of Frankenstein's Monster. Along the way, they encounter other classic horror characters with a comedic twist, such as a vampire, werewolf, mummy, swamp monster, hunchbacks, and a mad scientist.
- The Monster Squad (1987): A horror comedy film directed by Fred Dekker, from a script he co-wrote with Shane Black, and distributed by TriStar Pictures. The film centers on a group of pre-teens who form a Universal Monsters fan club called the "Monster Squad" and they must protect their hometown against a group of monsters, including modernized versions of Count Dracula, Frankenstein's Monster, the Wolf Man, the Mummy and the Gill-Man, who are in search of a magic amulet that will give them the power to take over the world.
- Darkman (1990): A superhero horror film directed and co-written by Sam Raimi about a scientist who works to develop synthetic skin but is burned alive and left for dead by mobsters. He then adopts the identity of a vigilante named Darkman to seek revenge on those who disfigured him. Released by Universal Pictures, the film drew inspiration from films like The Phantom of the Opera (1925), The Hunchback of Notre Dame (1923), and the Universal horror films of the 1930s and 1940s, as well as pulp characters like The Shadow.
- Frankenweenie (2012): A stop-motion animated film directed by Tim Burton, from a script written by John August, the film is a feature-length remake of his 1984 short film of the same name and is a parody and homage to the 1931 film Frankenstein and other classic monster films. Released by Walt Disney Pictures, it follows a young boy who uses the power of electricity to resurrect his dead dog, but his peers discover what he has done and bring their own deceased pets back to life, resulting in mayhem.
- Hotel Transylvania franchise (2012–2022): A series of family comedy films, which expanded into a franchise with other media. Produced by Sony Pictures Animation and released through Sony Pictures Releasing, the production studio included various famous monster characters, while utilizing comedically designed variations of those synonymous with the Universal Monsters as to avoid conflicts with copyright laws. Those based on the Universal Monsters characters include: Dracula (Adam Sandler (Note: Brian Hull voiced the character in Hotel Transylvania: Transformania.)), Dracula's Daughter (Selena Gomez), Frankenstein's Monster (Kevin James (Note: Brad Abrell voiced the character in Hotel Transylvania: Transformania.)), Bride of Frankenstein (Fran Drescher), Wolf Man (Steve Buscemi), the Mummy (CeeLo Green (Note: Green portrayed the character in Hotel Transylvania only.) and Keegan-Michael Key), Invisible Man (David Spade), Invisible Woman (Chrissy Teigen), Quasimodo (Jon Lovitz), the Gill-Man (Chris Parnell), Phantom of the Opera (Lovitz), She-Wolf (Molly Shannon), and Van Helsing (Jim Gaffigan).
- The Shape of Water (2017): Directed by Guillermo del Toro, from a script he co-wrote with Vanessa Taylor which was based on an original story by del Toro, the project initially entered development as a Creature from the Black Lagoon remake. Universal ultimately passed on del Toro's script, which would go on to earn various awards and recognition.

== Works cited ==
- "Universal Monsters". Rue Morgue. Marrs Media. November 2015. ISSN 1481-1103.
- Bessman, Jim (September 4, 1999). "Glass Scores 'Dracula' For Universal, Will Tour in Support". Billboard. Vol. 111, no. 36.
- Burrell, James (November 2015). "Cryptic Collectibles". Rue Morgue. Marrs Media. ISSN 1481-1103.
- Chibnall, Steve; Petley, Julian (2002). British Horror Cinema. Routledge. ISBN 0415230047.
- De Bruin-Molé, Megan (2022). "Do the Monster Mash: Universal's "Classic Monsters" and the Industrialization of the Gothic Transmedia Franchise". In Neill, Natalie (ed.). Gothic Mash-Ups: Hybridity, Appropriation, and Intertextuality in Gothic Storytelling. Rowman & Littlefield. ISBN 9781793636577.
- Early, Rosalind; Malkowicz, Tom (October 16, 2017). "Frankenstein's Monster in Popular Culture". Washington University in St. Louis.
- Jones, Steve (October 5, 2012). "'Dracula', 'Frankenstein' in new Universal Blu-ray set". USA Today.
- Kiss, Dr. Robert J. (2019). "Son of Dracula: The Release History". Son of Dracula. BearManor Media. ISBN 9781629334301.
- Mank, Gregory William (1981). It's Alive! The Classic Cinema Saga of Frankenstein. A.S. Barnes & Company, Inc. ISBN 0498024733.
- Mank, Gregory William (2010). Bela Lugosi and Boris Karloff: The Expanded Story of a Haunting Collaboration, with a Complete Filmography of Their Films Together. McFarland. ISBN 9780786454723.
- McCullaugh, Jim (October 24, 1992). "Sell-Thru Sales Judged by Cover". Billboard. Vol. 104, no. 43.
- Murray, Noel; Phipps, Keith (October 25, 2012). "A Guide to the Universal Studios Monster Movies, 1925–1955". The A.V. Club.
- Nye, Doug (August 18, 1995). "Horror films making a comeback". The News-Press. p. 6.
- Rhodes, Gary D. (2014). Tod Browning's Dracula. Tomahawk Press. ISBN 9780956683458.
- Weaver, Tom; Brunas, Michael; Brunas, John (2007) [1990]. Universal Horrors (2 ed.). McFarland & Company. ISBN 9780786429745.
- Worland, Rick (2007). The Horror Film: A Brief Introduction. Blackwell Publishing. ISBN 9781405139021.
- Young, Rob (October 16, 2015). "The Original Shared Universe: A Look Back At the Universal Monsters". Cinelinx / Movies. Games. Geek Culture.
- Murray, Andy (2005). Into the Unknown: The Fantastic Life of Nigel Kneale. UK: Critical Vision. ISBN 1900486504.
