= Scorpion King =

Scorpion King may refer to:

== People ==
- Scorpion I, predynastic pharaoh
- Scorpion II, predynastic pharaoh

== Film ==
- The Scorpion King (1992 film), a Hong Kong film
- The Scorpion King (film series), an American film series
  - The Scorpion King, a 2002 American-German-Belgian film
  - The Scorpion King 2: Rise of a Warrior, a 2008 American-German-South African film
  - The Scorpion King 3: Battle for Redemption, a 2012 American film
  - The Scorpion King 4: Quest for Power, a 2015 American film
  - The Scorpion King: Book of Souls, a 2018 American film

== Video games ==
- The Scorpion King: Sword of Osiris, a 2002 video game
- The Scorpion King: Rise of the Akkadian, a 2002 video game

== Other uses ==
- Mathayus, a fictional character in the film series The Scorpion King
- Scorpion Kings, a South African electronic dance music duo formed by DJ Maphorisa and Kabza de Small
  - Scorpion Kings, a 2019 EP by the duo

== See also ==
- Emperor scorpion, a species of African scorpion
- The Scorpion God, a 1971 novella collection by William Golding
