= The Scorpion King (film series) =

American action film series

- Created by: Stephen Sommers
- Original work: The Mummy Returns (2001)
- Owner: Universal Pictures
- Years: 2001–present

Films and television
- Films: The Scorpion King (2002); The Scorpion King 2: Rise of a Warrior (2008); The Scorpion King 3: Battle for Redemption (2012); The Scorpion King 4: Quest for Power (2015); The Scorpion King: Book of Souls (2018)

The Scorpion King film series consists of American sword and sorcery action adventure films, and is a spin-off of Stephen Sommers' The Mummy film series. The film series consists of one released theatrical film, four straight-to-home video releases, and an upcoming theatrical reboot.

== Films ==
Film	U.S. release date	Director(s)	Screenwriter(s)	Story by	Producer(s)
Main series
The Scorpion King	April 19, 2002	Chuck Russell	David Hayter, Stephen Sommers & William Osborne	Jonathan Hales & Stephen Sommers	Sean Daniel, James Jacks, Kevin Misher & Stephen Sommers
The Scorpion King 2: Rise of a Warrior	August 19, 2008	Russell Mulcahy	Randall McCormick	Randall McCormick	Sean Daniel & James Jacks
The Scorpion King 3: Battle for Redemption	January 10, 2012	Roel Reiné	Shane Kuhn & Brendan Cowles	Randall McCormick	Leslie Belzberg
The Scorpion King 4: Quest for Power	January 6, 2015	Mike Elliott	Michael D. Weiss	Michael D. Weiss	Mike Elliott & Ogden Gavanski
The Scorpion King: Book of Souls	October 23, 2018	Don Michael Paul	Frank DeJohn & David Alton Hedges	Frank DeJohn & David Alton Hedges	Mike Elliott
Reboot
Untitled reboot	TBA	TBA	Jonathan Herman	Jonathan Herman	Dany Garcia, Hiram Garcia & Dwayne Johnson

The Scorpion King story chronology
- The Scorpion King 2: Rise of a Warrior (2008)
- The Scorpion King (2002)
- The Scorpion King 3: Battle for Redemption (2012)
- The Scorpion King 4: Quest for Power (2015)
- The Scorpion King: Book of Souls (2018)
- The Mummy Returns (2001)

=== Future ===
In November 2020, a reboot of The Scorpion King film series was announced to be in development. Jonathan Herman was attached as screenwriter, with the plot taking place in modern-day and involving a contemporary adaptation of Mathayus of Akkad / Scorpion King. Dwayne Johnson was hired to serve as producer alongside Dany Garcia and Hiram Garcia. The project is a joint-venture production between Universal Pictures and Seven Bucks Productions.

== Cast and characters ==
Key
- A ^{Y} indicates the actor portrayed the role of a younger version of the character.
- A ^{A} indicates archive footage of the actor portraying the role was used.
- A dark gray cell indicates the character was not in the film.

Characters	Films				
Characters	The Scorpion King	The Scorpion King 2: Rise of a Warrior	The Scorpion King 3: Battle for Redemption	The Scorpion King 4: Quest for Power	The Scorpion King: Book of Souls
Characters	2002	2008	2012	2015	2018
Mathayus of Akkad The Scorpion King	Dwayne Johnson	Michael Copon Pierre Marais^{Y}	Victor Webster	Victor Webster	Zach McGowan
Memnon	Steven Brand				
Cassandra the Sorceress	Kelly Hu		Kelly Hu^{A}		
Arpid	Grant Heslov				
Balthazar	Michael Clarke Duncan				
Layla		Karen David			
Ari		Simon Quarterman			
Fung		Tom Wu			
Pollux		Andreas Wisniewski			
Sargon/Sarkhan		Randy Couture			
Olaf			Bostin Christopher		
King Ramusan			Temuera Morrison		
Princess Silda/Cobra			Krystal Vee		
Tsukai			Selina Lo		
Agromael			Dave Bautista		
Sorrell Raskov				Barry Bostwick	
Valina				Ellen Hollman	
Skizzura				Lou Ferrigno	
King Zakkour				Rutger Hauer	
Drazen				Will Kemp	
Nebserek					Peter Mensah
Tala					Pearl Thusi
Kensa					Mayling Ng
Uruk					Peter Charles

== Additional crew and production details ==
Crew/Detail	Film				
Crew/Detail	The Scorpion King	The Scorpion King 2: Rise of a Warrior	The Scorpion King 3: Battle for Redemption	The Scorpion King 4: Quest for Power	The Scorpion King: Book of Souls
Crew/Detail	2002	2008	2012	2015	2018
Composer	John Debney	Klaus Badelt	Trevor Morris	Geoff Zanelli	Frederik Wiedmann
Cinematographer	John R. Leonetti	Glynn Speeckaert	Roel Reiné	Trevor Michael Brown	Hein de Vos
Editor(s)	Greg Parsons & Michael Tronick	John Gilbert	Radu Ion & Matthew Friedman	Jeff McEvoy & Brian Scott Steele	Vanick Moradian
Production studios	Alphaville Films; WWF Entertainment	Universal 1440 Entertainment			
Distributing companies	Universal Pictures	Universal Pictures Home Entertainment	Universal Pictures Home Entertainment	Universal Pictures Home Entertainment	Universal Pictures Home Entertainment
Running time	92 minutes	109 minutes	105 minutes		102 minutes

== Video games ==
- The Scorpion King: Sword of Osiris (2002, Game Boy Advance)
- The Scorpion King: Rise of the Akkadian (2002, GameCube and PlayStation 2)

== Merchandise ==
Jakks Pacific produced toys based on The Scorpion King.
