= Kevin Misher =

American film producer

- Born: Fort Leonard Wood, Missouri, United States
- Education: Wharton School of Business
- Occupations: Film and television producer
- Spouse: Danielle Misher

Kevin Misher is an American movie and television producer via his Los Angeles–based production company, Misher Films.

== Early life ==
Misher was born in Fort Leonard Wood, Missouri and raised in Queens, New York. He earned a Bachelor's degree in economics from the University of Pennsylvania's Wharton School of Business.

== Career ==
Misher's first job in the entertainment industry was at HBO in New York, where he served as a financial analyst for then-CEO Michael Fuchs. He soon relocated to Los Angeles and landed in the mailroom at International Creative Management (ICM), before moving to the InterTalent Agency as an agent assistant. His talent for identifying quality material convinced legendary executive Mike Medavoy to hire Misher as a creative executive at Tri-Star Pictures directly from the mailroom.

Misher ascended the ranks quickly, and during his six years at Tri-Star, oversaw numerous productions, including Donnie Brasco, directed by Mike Newell and starring Al Pacino and Johnny Depp and the sports classic Rudy.

In 1996, Misher moved to Universal Pictures, where he soon became president of production at the age of 33. During his tenure, while Universal enjoyed unprecedented success, Misher supervised production on some of the studio's most acclaimed features, such as Out of Sight and Erin Brockovich, as well as initiating four of their most profitable franchises: the series of films spawned by The Mummy, Meet the Parents, The Fast and the Furious, and The Bourne Identity.

Misher left Universal in 2001 to form his own production company, Misher Films. His first project was the hit follow-up to The Mummy franchise, The Scorpion King. His subsequent productions include The Rundown, starring Dwayne Johnson and directed by Peter Berg, The Interpreter, directed by Sydney Pollack starring Nicole Kidman and Sean Penn, Public Enemies, directed by Michael Mann, starring Johnny Depp and Christian Bale, Mirror, Mirror starring Julia Roberts and the remake of Stephen King's horror novel, Carrie, for Sony/MGM starring Chloë Grace Moretz and Julianne Moore. In 2019, he produced Stephen Merchant's Fighting with My Family, which stars up-and-coming British actors Florence Pugh and Jack Lowden, along with Nick Frost, Lena Headey, Vince Vaughn and Dwayne Johnson for MGM/Annapurna.

Sony released the remake of the 2011 Mexican entry for Best Foreign Language Film, Miss Bala, co-produced by Misher, starring Gina Rodriguez, and directed by Catherine Hardwicke. Also that year, he co-produced the drama Richard Jewell.

In October 2020, Amblin and Universal Pictures will release Finch, starring Tom Hanks and to be directed by Miguel Sapochnik. Misher is producing with Robert Zemeckis’ company Imagemovers. Misher is also readying the sequel to the comedy classic Coming to America with Eddie Murphy for Paramount Pictures; and a movie version of the iconic children's character Carmen Sandiego, starring Gina Rodriguez for Netflix, is to be released. He is also preparing the scripted dramatic television series, Gridiron, in partnership with the NFL about the history of football in America for the Fox Network.

While Misher has an accomplished film career, he is best known for his game winning shot in the 1980 Camp Equinunk Upper Senior Basketball game.

== Filmography ==
=== Films ===
Year	Title	Director
2002	The Scorpion King	Chuck Russell
2003	The Rundown	Peter Berg
2005	The Interpreter	Sydney Pollack
2009	Fighting	Dito Montiel
2009	Public Enemies	Michael Mann
2009	Case 39	Christian Alvart
2010	It's Kind of a Funny Story	Anna Boden; Ryan Fleck
2012	Playing for Keeps	Gabriele Muccino
2013	Europa Report	Sebastián Cordero
2013	Carrie	Kimberly Peirce
2019	Miss Bala	Catherine Hardwicke
2019	Fighting with My Family	Stephen Merchant
2019	Richard Jewell	Clint Eastwood
2021	Coming 2 America	Craig Brewer
2021	Finch	Miguel Sapochnik
2023	You People	Kenya Barris
2027	The Comeback King	Judd Apatow

=== Television films ===
Year	Title	Director
2002	The Chang Family Saves the World	Paris Barclay

=== Television shows ===
Year	Title	Notes
1998−99	Babes in the Wood	—N/a
Year	Title	Notes
2024	It's in the Game: Madden NFL	4 episodes

=== Executive producer ===
Year	Title	Director
2012	Mirror Mirror	Tarsem Singh

=== Direct-to-video ===
Year	Title	Director
2008	The Scorpion King 2: Rise of a Warrior	Russell Mulcahy
2012	The Scorpion King 3: Battle for Redemption	Roel Reiné
2015	The Scorpion King 4: Quest for Power	Mike Elliott
2018	The Scorpion King: Book of Souls	Don Michael Paul
