= Sommers Company =

American film production company founded in 2004

The Sommers Company
- Industry: Film studio
- Founded: 2001; 25 years ago
- Founder: Stephen Sommers; Bob Ducsay
- Headquarters: United States
- Area served: Worldwide
- Key people: Stephen Sommers; Bob Ducsay; Matthew Stuecken

The Sommers Company is a film production company founded by Stephen Sommers and Bob Ducsay in 2001. The company had originally formed in 2001 to sign a first-look deal with Universal Pictures to develop the company's properties. The company developed a lot of unmade projects, including Proximity Effect and Airborn.

== Filmography ==
Release Date	Title	Notes	Budget	Box office
May 7, 2004	Van Helsing	co-production with Stillking Films	$160–170 million	$300.2 million
August 1, 2008	The Mummy: Tomb of the Dragon Emperor	co-production with Relativity Media and Alphaville Films	$145 million	$403.4 million
August 19, 2008	The Scorpion King 2: Rise of a Warrior			
January 10, 2012	The Scorpion King 3: Battle for Redemption	co-production with Universal 1440 Entertainment		
February 28, 2014	Odd Thomas	co-production with Fusion Films	$27 million	$1.3 million
January 6, 2015	The Scorpion King 4: Quest for Power	co-production with Universal 1440 Entertainment		
October 23, 2018	The Scorpion King: Book of Souls	co-production with Universal 1440 Entertainment		
