= Krystal Vee =

Thai actress

- Occupations: Actress; model; producer

Krystal Vee (Thai: คริสตัล วี) is a Thai actress, model and producer.

Vee worked as a model in Singapore, Hong Kong, Malaysia and the Philippines.

Vee starred alongside Victor Webster in 2012's The Scorpion King 3: Battle for Redemption.

== Filmography ==
- Maid (2004) - Paula
- Street Fighter: The Legend of Chun-Li (2009) - Lucy
- The Lazarus Papers (2010) - Nana
- The Scorpion King 3: Battle for Redemption (2012) - Silda
- Nighthawks in Banglok (2013 short) - Proy
- Trafficker (2015) - Ling
- Star Trek: Captain Pike (2016) - Captain Julie Decker
- The Untold Story (2017) - Natasha
