= Bostin Christopher =

American actor

Bostin Christopher is an American actor known for his roles in Unbreakable, Law & Order, and the 2008 film Otis.

== Career ==
Christopher was cast in the title role of Billy in the 2009 short film Billy's in Love, written and directed by John Larkin. He has also been featured in television shows such as Law & Order and Wonderland. Christopher also had a small role in M. Night Shyamalan's Unbreakable, as a Comic Book Clerk. He reprised his role in the 2019 sequel Glass. He also played Olaf, Mathayus' immensely strong sidekick, in Scorpion King 3. Christopher also works as an acting teacher at Virginia Commonwealth University.

== Filmography ==
=== Film ===
Year	Title	Role	Notes
2000	Unbreakable	Comic Book Clerk	
2008	Otis	Otis Broth	
2011	In My Pocket	Will	
2012	The Scorpion King 3: Battle for Redemption	Olaf	
2013	The Frozen Ground	Bakery Friend Al	
2019	Glass	Comic Book Clerk	
2019	Harriet	Local Statesman	

=== Television ===
Year	Title	Role	Notes
2000	Wonderland	Medical Student	Episode: "Pilot"
2000	Law & Order	Derrick Fedder	Episode: "Narcosis"
2001	Ed	Fred Butts	Episode: "Charity Cases"
2020	The Good Lord Bird	Dirk	Episode: "Meet the Lord"
