= The Scorpion King: Book of Souls =

- Release poster
- Directed by: Don Michael Paul
- Written by: David Alton Hedges; Frank DeJohn
- Produced by: Mike Elliott
- Starring: Zach McGowan; Pearl Thusi; Nathan Jones; Katy Louise Saunders; Mayling Ng; Howard Charles; Inge Beckmann; Tuks Tad Lungu; Peter Mensah
- Narrated by: Peter Jessop
- Cinematography: Hein de Vos
- Edited by: Vanick Moradian
- Music by: Frederik Wiedmann
- Production companies: Universal 1440 Entertainment; Sean Daniel Company; Sommers Company; Misher Films
- Distributed by: Universal Pictures Home Entertainment
- Release date: October 23, 2018
- Running time: 102 minutes
- Country: United States
- Language: English

The Scorpion King: Book of Souls is a 2018 American sword and sorcery film. As the fifth and final installment in The Scorpion King series (itself a spin-off of Stephen Sommers' The Mummy series), it represents the culmination of the original series and a sequel to The Scorpion King 4: Quest for Power. The direct-to-video film stars Zach McGowan as Mathayus, along with Pearl Thusi, Mayling Ng, and Peter Mensah in supporting roles. It was directed by Don Michael Paul and written by David Alton Hedges.

== Plot ==
In ancient Egypt, King Memtep forges a powerful sword known as the Fang of Anubis after striking a deal with the god of the underworld. The blade gains its strength by capturing the souls of those it slays, with their names inscribed in the mystical Book of Souls.

Centuries later, the evil warlord Nebserek unearths the Fang and begins a campaign of conquest. Meanwhile, a Nubian warrior named Tala seeks the legendary Scorpion King to help defeat Nebserek. She rescues a blacksmith named Mathayus, believed to be the Scorpion King, and enlists him on a quest to stop the dark power rising in Egypt.

Together, they face numerous challenges, including battles with mercenaries, a warrior tribe known as the Black Arrows, and a golem named Enkidu who protects Amina, the human embodiment of the Book of Souls. With Amina's help, they uncover the secret to destroying the Fang: it can only be neutralized by sacrificing the Book itself.

As Nebserek closes in, a climactic battle erupts. Enkidu dies protecting Amina, Tala ascends as Queen of Nubia, and Mathayus embraces his role as the Scorpion King. In a final act of sacrifice, Amina willingly perishes to break the curse of the sword, releasing the trapped souls. Mathayus departs alone, presumably to begin his campaign to conquer the known world.

== Cast ==
- Zach McGowan as Mathayus, the Scorpion King, the demigod of Akkadia and a blacksmith.
- Peter Mensah as Nebserek, Nubian God-King.
- Pearl Thusi as Tala, the Warrior princess and the daughter of Balthazar.
- Mayling Ng as Khensa, the warrior of Nebserek.
- Inge Beckmann as Mennofer, the priestess of Nebserek.
- Katy Louise Saunders as Amina, the Book of Souls and the Daughter of Memtep.
- Nathan Jones as Enkidu, the protector of Amina.
- Rizelle Januk as Hathor, a Nebserek soldier.
- Brandon Auret as Scar-faced Jackal, the warrior of Nebserek and the second in-command of Khensa.
- Howard Charles as Uruk, the son of Kali and the leader of Black Arrows.
- Afrika Likho Mgobo as Abel, a friend of Mathayus.
- Lesala Mampa as Anubis, the god of Underworld.
- Tuks Tad Lungu as Jackal Warrior
- Peter Jessop as the Narrator

== Production ==
The film was produced by Universal 1440 Entertainment and shot primarily in South Africa. Don Michael Paul, known for helming sequels such as Tremors 5: Bloodlines and Death Race: Beyond Anarchy, returned to direct. Principal photography featured on-location shooting in arid, desert-like environments to simulate ancient Egypt and Nubia. Zach McGowan was cast as the new Scorpion King, taking over the role previously played by actors like Dwayne Johnson and Victor Webster. The film marked the fifth and final entry in The Scorpion King franchise.
