= The Scorpion King 2: Rise of a Warrior =

2008 film by Russell Mulcahy

- Release poster
- Directed by: Russell Mulcahy
- Screenplay by: Randall McCormick
- Produced by: Sean Daniel; James Jacks
- Starring: Michael Copon; Karen David; Simon Quarterman; Tom Wu; Andreas Wisniewski; Randy Couture
- Cinematography: Glynn Speeckaert
- Edited by: John Gilbert
- Music by: Klaus Badelt
- Production companies: Universal Pictures Home Entertainment Productions; Alphaville/Misher Films; Film Afrika; ApolloMovie Beteiligungs
- Distributed by: Universal Studios Home Entertainment
- Release date: August 19, 2008 (United States)
- Running time: 109 minutes
- Countries: United States; Germany; South Africa
- Language: English

The Scorpion King 2: Rise of a Warrior is a 2008 action adventure film directed by Russell Mulcahy. An American-German-South African co-production, it is a prequel to the 2002 film The Scorpion King, itself a prequel to the 1999 remake of The Mummy. Filming for the film began on October 1, 2007, in Cape Town, South Africa. The film was released direct-to-video on August 19, 2008 to mixed reviews.

== Plot ==
Mathayus aims to avenge the death of his father at the hand of Sargon, now king of Akkad, by taking service in his Black Scorpions squad. After completing his training he is tasked by Sargon to kill Noah, Mathayus's own brother. He saves him and escapes the city, but a magic arrow follows them and kills Noah.

Mathayus boards a ship to Egypt, accompanied by his childhood friend Layla. He intends to get the Spear of Osiris in Egypt, which he believes will be able to pass through Sargon's black magic protection. A fellow traveller, Greek poet Aristophanes (Ari), tells Mathayus and Layla that the Spear only kills Egyptian creatures, but the Sword of Damocles will work. The trio travels to Greece, where they can enter the Underworld to retrieve the Sword of Damocles. On the way, they fall into a cell and are surrounded by men left as sacrifices for the Minotaur. Some of the sacrifices are mercenaries led by a man named Pollux who owe allegiance to Mathayus' father, so they help him and Layla to defeat the Minotaur. They also encounter and rescue a scared but Acrobatic skilled soldier from China named Fong who tags along because Ari promises him a shortcut back to his homeland China. Ari also convinces Pollux and his men to join them promising them riches and adventure

The enlarged group travels to the Underworld, where they have 1 hour to return from the underworld or they will be turned to stone, doomed to remain there forever. Pollux's men start getting greedy and impatient with the group and get more agitated and fearful due to the mental effects of being in the underworld. One by one Pollux's men fall victim to the monsters and traps hidden there until only Pollux is the only one left in his group. Eventually they are attacked by the goddess Astarte. Layla and Astarte fight, while Fong and Ari search for and find the sword. Fong and Ari find the sword spinning in a levitating spot, despite having trouble retrieving the sword, Fong eventually uses his acrobatic skills to finally grab the sword. Astarte tries to send Layla to hell, but Mathayus frees her, Pollux angered at Ari for the deception, threatens to kill Ari but Ari distracts him with a ruby. Mathayus, Layla, Fong and Ari all make it back to the pillar portal safe but Pollux is late and is turned to metal stone.

Astarte orders Sargon to get her sword back, and he asks for more dark powers. The group reaches Akkad, where Sargon turns on a machine that dumps oil into the water supply. The oil and water begin to flow through statues into the city, which are then set on fire.

Using the Sword of Damocles, Mathayus fights through to Sargon but finds his own father, who turns out to be Sargon in disguise. Sargon uses the confusion to disarm Mathayus and they begin fighting. Ari picks up the sword then hands it to Sargon, revealing that he had been bribing Ari with riches. More chaos and fighting ensues in the city and we learn that the sword that Ari gave Sargon was a fake and easily shattered. Ari bursts in and gives Mathayus the real sword. When Sargon states Mathayus owes him his loyalty as a Black Scorpion, Mathayus burns off his scorpion tattoo with the sword as Sargon retreats into the shadows.

Sargon turns into a giant near-invisible scorpion and continues his attack. Mathayus impales the Scorpion King Sargon with the Sword of Damocles. Layla manages to put out the fires while Fong fights and eliminates several of Sargon's soldiers. Astarte tells Mathayus that she will show him no mercy, but Mathayus tells her that she will have him one day. Pleased by this Astarte departs back to the underworld. Mathayus awakens in a bed after being nursed by Layla, who then tells him that he has won the right to be king, but he decides for now to head off on a life of adventure, knowing one day he shall be the Scorpion King. The film ends with Ari and Layla celebrating Mathayus victory, and Fong opening his own Chinese shop in the city.

== Cast ==
- Michael Copon as Mathayus
- Pierre Marais as Young Mathayus
- Karen David as Layla
- Simon Quarterman as Ari
- Tom Wu as Fong
- Andreas Wisniewski as Pollux
- Randy Couture as Sargon / Sarkhan
- Natalie Becker as Astarte
- Jeremy Crutchley as Baldo
- Shane Manie as Jesup

== Production ==
In August 2007, it was reported that Dwayne "The Rock" Johnson would not reprise his role, and Michael Copon was cast as the young Mathayus, Karen David as the lead heroine, Layla, and Randy Couture as the main villain, Sargon.

== Reception ==
=== Critical response ===
Beyond Hollywood said "the film is a complete loss, you have to wonder what the filmmakers could have done with a better script, a better cast, and a director who isn't so hit-and-miss as to be infuriating." Aaron Peck of Blog Critics said, "I really wanted to like this movie. The first Scorpion King is a laugh-fest yes, but it's fun to watch. This movie is painful."

Keith Uhlich of UGO said the film is "cheap, ugly, deadening, lacking even the common decency to be unintentionally funny, [the] sheer ineptitude increas[ing] with each passing scene." Film Jabber said The Scorpion King 2 "lacks action, excitement and, more importantly, quality," adding: "While the production values are decent enough for a film like this, you can tell from minute one that this movie was made simply to coincide with the theatrical release of The Mummy: Tomb of the Dragon Emperor." Mark Pollard of Kung Fu Cinema said that "the lead actors [keep] the movie marginally entertaining long after the predictable plot, generic effects work, and poorly-edited screen fighting grows weary."

Sam Sloan of A Slice of Sci-Fi, said the film is "a notch up in quality from what is typically seen on a Saturday night from the Sci-Fi Channel," remarking that director Russell Mulcahy "was able to turn what should have been a totally dreadful movie into a watchable film that didn't make me feel like I had completely wasted an hour and a half of my time." Kenneth Brown of Hi-Def Digest said The Scorpion King 2 "feels like an aborted TV pilot, [...] painfully overplotted, yet so mind-numbingly simple that it's impossible to care about its characters or central conflicts."

Christopher Monfette of IGN gave it six out of ten, and judging it compared to other direct-to-DVD films said "everybody involved was at the very least aiming for something worthwhile, and though the effort doesn't always translate, there's an entertaining movie here if you can keep your perspective intact."

The film earned $12,093,296 in home media sales.

== Sequel ==
A sequel entitled The Scorpion King 3: Battle for Redemption was released on 10 January 2012 on DVD and Blu-ray Disc with Victor Webster as Mathayus.
