= The Scorpion King 4: Quest for Power =

- Release poster
- Directed by: Mike Elliott
- Written by: Michael D. Weiss
- Produced by: Mike Elliott; Ogden Gavanski
- Starring: Victor Webster; Ellen Hollman; Lou Ferrigno; Rutger Hauer; Royce Gracie; Eve Torres; Ian Whyte
- Cinematography: Trevor Michael Brown
- Edited by: Jeff McEvoy; Brian Scott Steele
- Music by: Geoff Zanelli
- Production companies: Universal 1440 Entertainment; Sommers Company; Misher Films; Alphaville Films
- Distributed by: Universal Studios Home Entertainment
- Release date: January 6, 2015
- Running time: 105 minutes
- Country: United States
- Language: English

The Scorpion King 4: Quest for Power is a 2015 sword and sorcery film. It was released direct-to-video on January 6, 2015. It is the fourth installment in The Scorpion King series and stars Victor Webster in the title role with supporting roles by Ellen Hollman, Lou Ferrigno, Rutger Hauer, Royce Gracie, Eve Torres, and Ian Whyte. This film continues the story of Mathayus, after the events in The Scorpion King 3: Battle for Redemption.

== Plot ==
Mathayus and his partner Drazen (who is under the Akkadian's tutelage) infiltrate the palace of Skizurra to acquire an artifact known as the Urn of Kings for King Zakkour of Al-Moraad. In the process, they are discovered and a fight ensues, revealing Drazen to be a traitor who leaves with the Urn.

Under the instructions of Zakkour, Mathayus follows Drazen to the kingdom of Norvania in the Northern Forests to deliver a peace treaty. Drazen gives the Urn to his father, King Yannick, who shatters it to retrieve the Golden Key of Lord Alcaman, a sorcerer who once controlled the entire known world. The key has an inscription written on it. The inscription can show the way to use the powers of Alcaman.

Mathayus arrives in Norvania and is accosted by Yannick's guards. He allows himself to be arrested to enter Yannick's castle. In jail, Mathayus meets inmate Valina Raskov, who convinces Mathayus to pay her to meet Yannick. She is a member of the original royal bloodline, and Drazen wishes to cement Yannick's rise to power with her public execution. Drazen later takes Mathayus to be tortured, suspecting that his treaty is a pretense. However, Yannick believes Mathayus, releases him, and invites him to a dinner banquet. Drazen assassinates Yannick with scorpions and blames it on Mathayus. Before dying, Yannick gives the Key to Mathayus, who resists capture and flees with Valina.

The pair go to Valina's father, Sorrell Raskov, a scholar and inventor who is unwilling to retake his place as ruler. Sorrell reads the inscription, which says that they must find a hidden palace in Glenrrossovia to find Alcaman's crown, which will let them rule the world. Drazen arrives, takes the key, sets the house on fire, and leaves them to die.

The heroes escape and go to Glenrrossovia, where Drazen is terrorizing the villagers to find the palace. After enlisting a local boy to steal the key, they take it to the Temple of the Goddess, presided over by High Priestess Feminina. The Key inserts into a symbolic hole in a Goddess statue, located in the Temple's underground sanctuary. The sanctuary is pushed through the earth, revealing stained glass that shows the next direction of the journey.

Valina finds her friend Roland from the dungeon, and he joins their party. They ask Gorak for a map of the Tugarin Forest. There, Alcaman's palace is hidden in a mountain and guarded by a dragon. He gives it to them after Valina beats Chancara in a fight. On their way through the forest, they are captured by a pygmy tribe. Pygmy chief Onus attempts to sacrifice them to "creatures of the forest." But Mathayus' bellow causes the creatures to retreat, and the tribe to embrace them. The heroes eventually proceed towards the mountain and find that the dragon is really a mechanical contraption.

At Alcaman's palace, they open the hidden door into the mountain. Roland proves to be a traitor working for Drazen, whose men fill the throne room of Alcaman. Mathayus and Valina fight the attackers, but Sorrell is mortally wounded by Drazen. Armed with Sorrell's notes, Mathayus proceeds deeper into Alcaman's palace, rigged with traps that kill those with Drazen, and finds the Crown of Alcaman believing its power to be the only hope of healing Sorrell. Putting it on, he is covered in fire, but does not burn. As he prepares to return to his comrades, Drazen overpowers him and takes the Crown. Drazen is judged unworthy and the Crown freezes him to death. Mathayus shatters Drazen's frozen body and uses the crown to revive Sorrell, who starts believing in magic.

The group leaves the mountain and seals the door with the Key and Crown inside, telling the remainder of Drazen's men that Alcaman's power was just a myth. Sorrell is crowned King once more, but gives his crown to Valina, who promises to build a kingdom based on "science and mathematics, truth and reason, and just a little bit of magic".

Meanwhile, Mathayus is relieved from his service to Zakkour, who allowed him to stay with Queen Valina in her service. Valina and Mathayus kiss.

== Cast ==
- Victor Webster as Mathayus, The Scorpion King
- Ellen Hollman as Valina
- Will Kemp as Drazen
- Barry Bostwick as Sorrell Raskov
- Michael Biehn as King Yannick
- Rutger Hauer as King Zakkour
- M. Emmet Walsh as Gorak
- Eve Torres as Chancara
- Brandon Hardesty as Boris
- Rodger Halston as Roland
- Leigh Gill as Chief Onus
- Ian Whyte as Prince Duan
- Corneliu Ulici as Radu
- Esmé Bianco as High Priestess Feminina
- Lou Ferrigno as Skizurra
- Royce Gracie as Anngar
- Roy Nelson as Roykus
- Antônio Silva as Cronkus
- Don "The Dragon" Wilson as Gizzan

== Sequel ==
A fifth film, titled The Scorpion King: Book of Souls, was released in 2018. Zach McGowan replaced Victor Webster as Mathayus. The film featured an all-new cast including Pearl Thusi, Katy Saunders, Nathan Jones and Peter Mensah. The film was directed by Don Michael Paul.
