= The Scorpion King 3: Battle for Redemption =

- Release poster
- Directed by: Roel Reiné
- Screenplay by: Brendan Cowles; Shane Kuhn
- Story by: Randall McCormick
- Produced by: Leslie Belzberg
- Starring: Victor Webster; Bostin Christopher; Temuera Morrison; Krystal Vee; Selina Lo; Kimbo Slice; Dave Bautista; Billy Zane; Ron Perlman
- Cinematography: Roel Reiné
- Edited by: Matthew Friedman; Radu Ion
- Music by: Trevor Morris
- Production companies: Universal 1440 Entertainment; Sommers Company; Misher Films; Alphaville Films
- Distributed by: Universal Studios Home Entertainment
- Release date: January 10, 2012
- Running time: 105 minutes
- Country: United States
- Language: English

The Scorpion King 3: Battle for Redemption is a 2012 American sword and sorcery film released direct-to-video by Universal Studios Home Entertainment on January 10, 2012. It is the third installment in The Scorpion King series and stars Victor Webster in the title role, replacing Dwayne Johnson, with supporting roles by Bostin Christopher, Temuera Morrison, Krystal Vee, Selina Lo, Kimbo Slice, Dave Bautista, Billy Zane, and Ron Perlman. The film continues the story of Mathayus, after he becomes the Scorpion King at the end of The Scorpion King and focuses on Mathayus battling Talus and trying to stop him from claiming the Book of the Dead. This was the first film produced by Universal 1440 Entertainment.

== Plot ==
Years after giving Mathayus the prophecy that his peaceful kingdom would not last forever, his wife Queen Cassandra dies. Mathayus allows his kingdom to fall apart in the aftermath of the deadly plague which claimed his wife's life, and he believes his reign of nobility to be over. Mathayus then becomes a mercenary once more, just as he was prior to his war with Memnon.

Talus is the younger brother of Horus, a powerful king of Egypt; Talus wishes to conquer his brother's kingdom since Horus was made king over him. To do so, Talus and his army go to the Far East to steal the Book of the Dead from Ramusan, a king and ally of Horus. To stop Talus, Horus hires Mathayus and pairs him with the Teutonic warrior Olaf.

Talus kidnaps Ramusan's daughter, Silda. Ramusan then tells Mathayus that if he can save his daughter, he will have the right to marry her and once again raise a kingdom. Before Mathayus manages to rescue Silda, she is whisked away by the ninja army of the mysterious "Cobra". Talus hires Mathayus and Olaf to bring back the princess, as well as Cobra's head. They wind up in an exiles' camp led by Cobra, who turns out to be Silda herself.

Talus arrives at Ramusan's palace and takes the Book of the Dead while injuring Ramusan. With this, he reanimates the dead warriors Zulu Kondo, Agromael and Tsukai. In a test to see their strength, Talus orders them to kill his best men, which they do easily. Tsukai and Zulu Kondo are ordered to attack the exiles' camp. Working together, Mathayus, Olaf, and Silda's ninjas manage to defeat Zulu Kondo in battle. However, Tsukai manages to escape.

Mathayus and Olaf return to Ramusan's palace, now Talus' headquarters. They pretend to have rescued Silda and present a severed head supposedly belonging to Cobra. Talus still intends to marry Silda and takes her to his sleeping chambers. Mathayus attacks Talus, who is saved by the timely intervention of Tsukai. Mathayus pursues Talus while Silda faces Tsukai. At the same time, Olaf attempts to get the Book of the Dead but has to fight Agromael. The ninjas stop Talus, and Mathayus somehow finds the ailing Ramusan and together they use the Book of the Dead to prevent Tsukai and Agromael from killing Silda and Olaf, respectively.

With Ramusan dying in his daughter's arms and Talus left to face the wrath of the ninjas, Tsukai and Agromael bow down to Mathayus as the new ruler of Ramusan and Talus' kingdoms. When Horus arrives at the city gates, he is greeted by Mathayus, who has taken up the mantle of Scorpion King once more.

It is later revealed that Mathayus and Silda shared a kiss on the night of their earlier party.

== Cast ==
- Victor Webster as Mathayus, the Scorpion King
- Bostin Christopher as Olaf
- Temuera Morrison as King Ramusan
- Krystal Vee as Princess Silda / Cobra
- Selina Lo as Tsukai
- Kevin 'Kimbo Slice' Ferguson as Zulu Kondo
- Dave Bautista as Agromael
- Billy Zane as King Talus
- Ron Perlman as Horus
- Brandon Cohen as Salim
- Kelly Hu as Cassandra (flashback from The Scorpion King)

== Production ==
The script originally called for most of the movie to be set in Europe. But because of the movie's limited budget, the director moved the movie to Thailand, where it was cheaper to shoot. They used CGI to add the sand around Horus's city, which is supposed to be in a desert.

They had 400 extras for the battle scenes, but most of the fighting was done with the main cast plus just 12 stunt men, who played multiple roles in different costumes so they could be in all of the battles. The rest of the extras weren't trained to fight, so they stayed in the background, and careful observers can see that they aren't actually doing any dangerous fighting themselves.

They were originally planning for Zulu Kondo to throw his hammer, then have it magically fly back to his hand. But they decided to cut that bit when they saw the 2011 movie Thor had already done the same thing.

Many of the movie's scenes were done at tourist locations, which they weren't able to reserve just for themselves. So they frequently had to stop filming because tourists walked through the scene.

== Reception ==
IGN, who gave the film a 4/10 rating, criticized it for "wretched dialogue, awful acting (Victor Webster stumbles over every sentence he's handed), and stagey action, much of which plays more like rehearsal than the real deal. [...] My bar was very low, and yet the film somehow found a way to sink beneath it." Jason Best of TVTimes: "The storytelling is so ham-fisted that you really need to be a confirmed fan of the action fantasy genre to sit through all the boring stuff in between." Conversely, CraveOnline gave the film a 7/10 rating and commented: "If I had to rank them, I'd say The Scorpion King 3: Battle for Redemption is the least of the Scorpion King movies (they've been subtly deteriotating since the first one), lacking as it does a dashing lead performance or a particularly involving storyline. but it's still a damned fun B-movie, with likable characters and a series of entertainingly produced action sequences for fantasy movie fans of all stripes." The film has earned $4,098,483 in home market sales.

== Sequel ==
A fourth film in the franchise has been released, titled The Scorpion King 4: Quest for Power. Victor Webster reprised his role from the third film. Michael Biehn, Rutger Hauer, Lou Ferrigno, and former 2007 WWE Diva Search winner Eve Torres also joined the cast.
