= Victor Webster =

Canadian actor

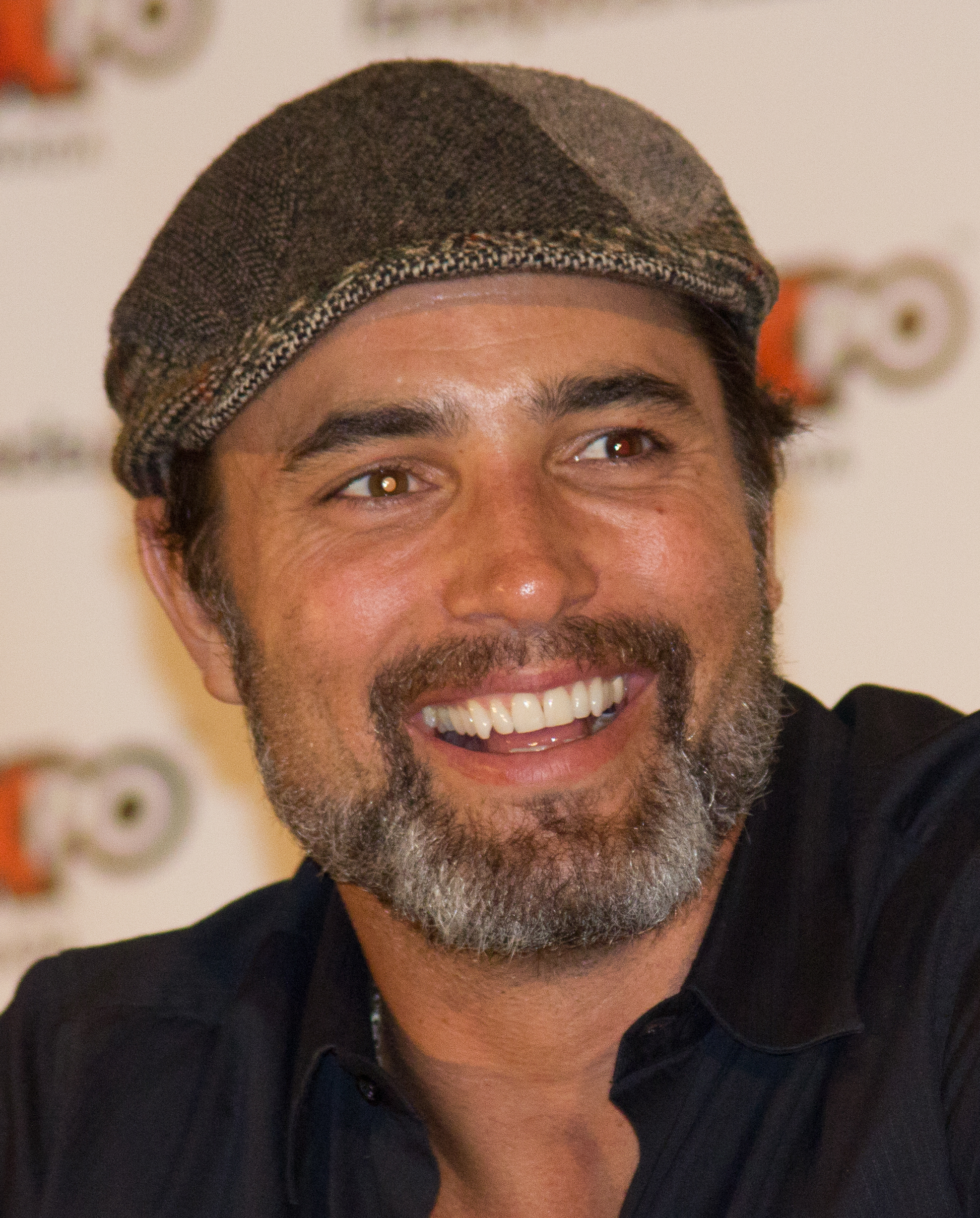
- Webster at a panel for Continuum at the 2012 Fan Expo Canada
- Born: February 7, 1973 (age 53); Calgary, Alberta, Canada
- Years active: 1998–present
- Spouse: Shantel VanSanten (m. 2021; div. 2024)

Victor Webster (born February 7, 1973) is a Canadian actor. He is known for being the second actor to play Nicholas Alamain on the NBC daytime soap Days of Our Lives from 1999 to 2000, and for his roles as the mutant Brennan Mulwray in Mutant X, Coop the cupid on Charmed and detective Carlos Fonnegra in Continuum.

He is also known for his portrayal of Mathayus of Akkad / The Scorpion King in The Scorpion King 3: Battle for Redemption (2012) and The Scorpion King 4: Quest for Power (2015).

== Early life ==
Webster is the son of Roswitha, a hair stylist, and John ("Jack") Webster, a police officer. As a teenager, his behaviour often got him into trouble. To find a more productive outlet, he studied and eventually taught martial arts, earning an undefeated record as an amateur kickboxer and heavyweight black belt. Meanwhile, his early interest in acting was demonstrated in his involvement with numerous school plays and theatre classes.

== Career ==
Webster worked as a stockbroker and in import/export. He appeared in Cosmopolitan magazine's "All About Men" 1998 special issue. He began to pursue acting opportunities in the late 1990s. In 1999 he landed a part on the NBC daytime soap opera, Days of Our Lives. After leaving Days, he was cast as one of the leads in the nationally syndicated SF-action series Mutant X (2001), which ran for three seasons. In 2002, he was listed as one of People magazine's "50 Most Eligible Bachelors".

Webster appeared in the film Bringing Down the House and made guest appearances on other TV shows, including a 2003 role on HBO's Sex and the City, while working on Mutant X. Since Mutant X, Webster has continued to alternate between television and theatrical film roles. In 2006 he appeared in the final episodes of Charmed, portraying Coop, a cupid who married Phoebe Halliwell (played by Alyssa Milano) in the final episode of the series.

In 2009, Webster had a recurring role as Caleb Brewer on the Melrose Place relaunch. He appeared on the season 5 episode "Parasite" of Criminal Minds playing a con artist-turned-serial killer. He also guest-starred in the 2009 murder mystery Harper's Island. He had a small role in the 2010 Tyler Perry film Why Did I Get Married Too. In 2011, he had a recurring role on Castle as Kate Beckett's boyfriend, Josh Davidson. In the 2013 remake of Embrace of the Vampire, he played the lead male vampire Stefan. On Girlfriends' Guide to Divorce, he played Carl, a gigolo. In the 2016 Hallmark original movie Summer Villa, he's a chef. In 2019, Webster began starring in the Hallmark Movies & Mysteries series The Matchmaker Mysteries. In 2023, Webster starred as David in Hallmark’s Mystery on Mistletoe Lane, and in 2024, started playing Chad Norton in Hannah Swensen Mysteries.

== Personal life ==
Webster got engaged to actress Shantel VanSanten on February 9, 2021. They married in October 2021. In January 2023, Webster filed for divorce after less than two years of marriage. The divorce was finalized on July 2, 2024.

== Filmography ==
Year	Title	Role	Notes
1998–1999	Sunset Beach	Roger	4 episodes
1999	The Lot	Victor Mansfield	Unknown episodes
1999–2000	Days of Our Lives	Nicholas Alamain #2	44 episodes
2000	Gangland	Joey	
2000	The Chippendales Murder	Marco Carolo	
2001	Baywatch: Hawaii	Lyle Garrett	"My Father the Hero"
2001	Becker	Craig	1 episode
2001	V.I.P.	Dean McGee	1 episode
2001–2004	Mutant X	Brennan Mulwray	66 episodes
2002	Wishmaster: The Prophecy Fulfilled	Hunter	Direct to video
2003	Bringing Down the House	Glen	
2003	Sex and the City	Chip Kil-Kinney	Episode: "To Market, to Market"
2005	Dirty Love	Richard	
2005	Las Vegas	Estefan	1 episode
2005	Must Love Dogs	Eric	
2005	Inconceivable	Sam Marrak	1 episode
2005	Noah's Arc	Brett	1 episode
2005–2006	Related	Marco	4 episodes
2006	Man vs. Monday	Paul	Short film
2006	Emily's Reasons Why Not	Stan	1 episode
2006	Life Happens	Chuck	Short film
2006	Charmed	Coop	7 episodes
2006	Reba	Jordan	1 episode
2007	CSI: Miami	Roberto Chavez	1 episode
2007	NCIS	Dane Hogan	1 episode
2007	Sands of Oblivion	Mark Tevis	Television film
2007–2008	Lincoln Heights	Dr. Christian Mario	6 episodes
2007	Moonlight	Owen Haggans	1 episode
2007	Primal Scream	Jesse	
2008	Heart of a Dragon	Rick Hansen	
2009	Killer Hair	Vic Donovan	Television film
2009	Hostile Makeover	Vic Donovan	Television film
2009	Harper's Island	Hunter Jennings	3 episodes
2009	Melrose Place	Caleb	8 episodes
2009	Surrogates	Lopez	
2010	Criminal Minds	William Hodges	1 episode
2010	Burning Palms	Paulo	
2010	Bones	Brad Benson	1 episode
2010	Why Did I Get Married Too?	Ray	
2010—2011	Castle	Josh Davidson	4 episodes
2011	Drop Dead Diva	Gary Rice	1 episode
2011	NCIS: Los Angeles	Stanley King	1 episode
2011	CSI: Crime Scene Investigation	Bill Pernin	1 episode
2012–2015	Continuum	Carlos Fonnegra	4 seasons; 42 episodes
2012	The Scorpion King 3: Battle for Redemption	Mathayus	Direct to DVD
2012	White Collar	Eric Dunham	1 episode
2012	Puppy Love	Ben	Television film (Hallmark)
2013	Embrace of the Vampire	Professor Brendan Cole / Stefan	Direct to DVD
2014	A Good Man	Sasha	Theatrical film
2014	Christmas Icetastrophe	Charlie	Television film (SyFy)
2015	The Magic Stocking	Scott Terrill	Television film (Hallmark)
2015	The Scorpion King 4: Quest for Power	Mathayus	Direct to DVD
2015	Mom	Dr. Harris	1 episode
2015–2016	Girlfriends' Guide to Divorce	Carl	2 episodes
2016	Dead Rising: Endgame	Chuck Greene	Crackle original movie
2016	Summer Villa	Matthew Everston	Hallmark original movie
2017	Love Blossoms	Declan "Dec" Granger	Television film (Hallmark)
2017	A Harvest Wedding	David Nichols	Television film (Hallmark)
2017	Home for Christmas Day	Jackson	Television film (Hallmark)
2017	Younger	Diego	1 episode
2017–2018	Chesapeake Shores	Douglas Peterson	4 episodes
2018	Homegrown Christmas	Carter	Television film (Hallmark)
2019–2020	Workin' Moms	Mike Bolinski	11 episodes
2019	Matchmaker Mysteries: A Killer Engagement	Det. Kyle Carter	Television film (Hallmark)
2020	Matchmaker Mysteries: A Fatal Romance	Det. Kyle Carter	Television film (Hallmark)
2020	Hearts of Winter	Grant Oliver	Television film (Hallmark)
2020	Five Star Christmas	Jake Finlay	Television film (Hallmark)
2021	Matchmaker Mysteries: The Art of Kill	Det. Kyle Carter	Television film (Hallmark)
2022	The Wedding Veil Legacy	Nick	Television film (Hallmark)
2022	A Christmas Cookie Catastrophe	Sam	Television film (Hallmark)
2023	The Wedding Veil Journey	Nick	Television film (Hallmark)
2023	Mystery on Mistletoe Lane	David	Television film (Hallmark)
2024	One Bad Apple: A Hannah Swensen Mystery	Chad Norton	Television film (Hallmark)
2024	A Sprinkle of Deceit: A Hannah Swensen Mystery	Chad Norton	Television film (Hallmark)
2024	Sugarplummed	Stephen	Television film (Hallmark)
2025	Reality Bites: A Hannah Swensen Mystery	Chad Norton	Television film (Hallmark)
2025	Pie to Die For: A Hannah Swensen Mystery	Chad Norton	Television film (Hallmark)
2026	Sugar & Vice: A Hannah Swensen Mystery	Chad Norton	Television film (Hallmark)
2026	Best Served Cold: A Hannah Swensen Mystery	Chad Norton	Television film (Hallmark)
2026	'Tis the Season for Setups	Ridge	Television film (Hallmark)
