= Rick O'Connell =

Fictional character from The Mummy

- The Mummy character
- Brendan Fraser as Rick O'Connell in The Mummy (1999)
- First appearance: The Mummy (1999)
- Created by: Stephen Sommers
- Portrayed by: Brendan Fraser
- Voiced by: Ryan Drummond (The Mummy video game); John Schneider (The Mummy: The Animated Series); James Horan (The Mummy Returns video game); Brendan Fraser (Tomb of the Dragon Emperor video game (home consoles); Dee Bradley Baker (Tomb of the Dragon Emperor (Nintendo DS version)

In-universe information
- Full name: Richard O'Connell
- Nickname: Rick
- Occupation: Adventurer/Archeologist (retired); Legionnaire & mercenary (formerly)
- Spouses: Evelyn O'Connell
- Children: Alex O'Connell
- Relatives: Jonathan Carnahan (brother-in-law)
- Nationality: American

Richard "Rick" O'Connell is a fictional character and the main protagonist of the third incarnation of The Mummy franchise. He is portrayed by Brendan Fraser. Fraser reprised the role of O'Connell in The Mummy Returns released in 2001, and in The Mummy: Tomb of the Dragon Emperor from 2008. He is slated to reprise his role in a fourth film.

Fraser's portrayal of O'Connell has been well-received, and the character has been compared to the likes of Indiana Jones.

== Characterization ==
=== The Mummy ===
Rick O'Connell served as a captain in the French Foreign Legion in 1923 before becoming an adventurer and treasure hunter after the massacre of the men he served with at Hamunaptra, with the exception of Beni, a former friend and soldier who left him to die. In 1926, Evelyn and her brother Jonathan discover him in a Cairo prison, awaiting to be executed. Before being taken away to be hanged, he kisses her and demands to be released, in return to help them find Hamunaptra, as he is one of the few men who returned alive. Evelyn succeeds in negotiating his release at the last second and they board a ship to begin their journey on the Nile, with the two beginning to show mutual attraction to one another. Rick runs into Beni and throws him overboard as payback for leaving him to die. After the ship is attacked and destroyed by warriors known as the Medjai, who wish to prevent the resurrection of the "creature", O'Connell leads them by camel across the desert to Hamunaptra where they unearth the rotting corpse of Imhotep, the creature that the Medjai fear. Later that evening after fending off another attack by the Medjai, he watches as Evelyn accidentally awakens Imhotep through reading from the Book of the Dead. After a scuffle with the plagues that come with unleashing Imhotep and running into the Mummy himself, he flees with the remaining survivors back to Cairo. Beni is left behind and encounters Imhotep, becoming his henchman in exchange for his life.

The Mummy follows them to Cairo and enslaves the population of the city to be his zombie-like army, ordering them to find and kill them, with the exception of Evelyn. After being cornered, Evelyn surrenders to Imhotep and O'Connell is forced to flee with Jonathan and a Medjai named Ardeth Bay. He enlists the help of Winston, a retired airforce pilot, to charter himself, Jonathan and Ardeth back to Hamunaptra. After Winston dies when the plane crash lands in Hamunaptra, he battles Imhotep and saves Evelyn but struggles to defeat him due to being invincible. Only with the timely help of Jonathan and Evelyn reading from the Book of the Living is Imhotep made mortal again and is killed by Rick. Following his defeat, Hamunaptra begins to collapse and sinks into the sand, due to the handiwork of Beni, who activates a self-destruct trap while trying to hoard treasure from the underground city. Upon escaping, they find Ardeth alive, having believed he had died during the battle, who wishes them farewell as he leaves, satisfied that the 'creature' is gone now. Having fallen in love, Evelyn and Rick share a kiss while riding off into the sunset with Jonathan in tow on camels, unaware that their saddle bags are filled with looted treasure that Beni managed to get out of Hamunaptra before it sank into the desert.

=== The Mummy Returns ===
By 1933, Rick and Evelyn are married with an 8-year-old son named Alex and live in an elaborate Baroque estate outside London, having become wealthy due to the treasure that was collected from the end of the first film. Both he and Evelyn begin to investigate the legend of the Scorpion King, bringing along their son on their expeditions, while Jonathan remains in Britain. When his son is kidnapped by acolytes, O'Connell must race to save him and face the return of Imhotep. Through conversations with loyal friend Ardeth Bay, it is revealed that O'Connell is a descendant of the Medjai, the race of ancients tasked with being a warrior for God. Ardeth uses Rick's wrist tattoo as evidence of his 'fate'. It is also revealed that he grew up in an orphanage in Cairo. O'Connell struggles with the notion of his destiny until he beholds a hieroglyphic with similarities to his situation. In the end, O'Connell accepts his fate and is guided to the Oasis Pyramid, where Imhotep is planning to gain control of the Scorpion King's army. O'Connell rages his way through a three-way battle that pits him against Imhotep and the Scorpion King and succeeds in destroying both of them, while also saving his son. The conclusion of the battle and the death of the Scorpion King destroys the oasis, though O'Connell and his family escape in a hot-air balloon navigated by his long-time friend, Izzy.

=== The Mummy: Tomb of the Dragon Emperor ===
In 1946, Rick has retired to a quiet life of fly fishing and motorcar driving in the countryside of Oxfordshire. He is bored with his wealth and status as the greatest adventurer alive. In a twist of fate, however, his son, Alex (Luke Ford) ends up going to China and waking up the most terrifying mummies of the Orient. Thrilled to be a part of something exciting again, O'Connell and his wife Evelyn jump at the chance to join their 20-year-old son on a quest for Shangri-La to quell the advancement of a revived Terracotta Army mummies. Along the way, O'Connell fights evil Chinese nationalists with the help of the yeti.

=== Fourth film ===
Fraser is slated to reprise his role for the fourth The Mummy film that is currently in development.

== Casting and portrayal ==
Producer James Jacks offered the role of Rick O'Connell to Tom Cruise (who was later cast in the reboot film), Brad Pitt, Matt Damon and Ben Affleck, but the actors were not interested or could not fit the role into their respective schedules. Jacks and director Stephen Sommers were impressed with the money that George of the Jungle was making at the box office and cast Brendan Fraser as a result. Sommers also commented that he felt Fraser fit the Errol Flynn swashbuckling character he had envisioned perfectly. The actor understood that his character "doesn't take himself too seriously, otherwise the audience can't go on that journey with him".
