= The Mummy: Book of the Dead =

Upcoming American film

- Logo
- Directed by: Matt Bettinelli-Olpin; Tyler Gillett
- Written by: David Coggeshall
- Based on: Characters by: Stephen Sommers Lloyd Fonvielle Kevin Jarre John L. Balderston; Nina Wilcox Putnam; Richard Schayer
- Produced by: Sean Daniel; William Sherak; James Vanderbilt; Paul Neinstein
- Starring: Brendan Fraser; Rachel Weisz; John Hannah; Arnold Vosloo; Oded Fehr; Kevin J. O'Connor; Michael Johnston; Numan Acar; Tara Emad
- Cinematography: Brett Jutkiewicz
- Edited by: Jay Prychidny
- Music by: Hesham Nazih
- Production companies: Universal Pictures; Radio Silence Productions; Project X Entertainment; Hivemind
- Distributed by: Universal Pictures
- Release date: October 15, 2027
- Country: United States
- Language: English

The Mummy: Book of the Dead is an upcoming American action adventure film directed by Matt Bettinelli-Olpin and Tyler Gillett, and written by David Coggeshall. It is a direct sequel to The Mummy (1999) and The Mummy Returns (2001), ignoring the events of The Mummy: Tomb of the Dragon Emperor (2008), and is the fourth installment in Stephen Sommers’ The Mummy series.

In the years since the release of the 2017 Mummy film which was a critical and commercial failure, plans for a continuation of the Sommers-directed Mummy films were being discussed in 2022 due to interest from Brendan Fraser months ahead of him earning the Academy Award for Best Actor for his work on The Whale. The film was announced to be in development three years later with both Fraser and Rachel Weisz returning as the O'Connells and the directing duo of Bettinelli-Olpin and Gillett hired to helm the project.

The Mummy: Book of the Dead is scheduled to be released in the United States by Universal Pictures on October 15, 2027.

== Cast ==
- Brendan Fraser as Rick O'Connell, Evelyn's husband, a treasure hunter and former French Foreign Legion.
- Rachel Weisz as Evelyn "Evy" Carnahan-O'Connell, a trained Egyptologist who is married to Rick O'Connell. Weisz returns to the role following her absence from Tomb of the Dragon Emperor, where she was replaced by Maria Bello.
- John Hannah as Jonathan Carnahan, Evelyn's older brother who also has training as an Egyptologist.
- Arnold Vosloo as Imhotep, the titular mummy and undead High Priest of Osiris.
- Oded Fehr as Ardeth Bay, a Medjai chieftain and warrior.
- Kevin J. O'Connor as Beni Gabor, Rick's former colleague in the French Foreign Legion who later served Imhotep and was seemingly devoured by flesh-eating scarabs at the end of the first film.

New cast members for the franchise consists of Michael Johnston, Numan Acar and Tara Emad in undisclosed roles.

== Production ==
After The Mummy: Tomb of the Dragon Emperor (2008) was released, actress Maria Bello said that another The Mummy film would "absolutely" be made and that she had already signed on to reprise her role as Evelyn Carnahan-O'Connell. Actor Luke Ford was signed on for three more films as well. On April 4, 2012, Universal announced their plans to reboot the franchise. The film was intended to be the first installment of the Dark Universe, simply titled The Mummy, and was released in June 2017. Upon release, the film became a critical and commercial failure with plans for the shared universe cancelled.

On October 12, 2022, series actor Brendan Fraser revealed that he was "open" to revisit the franchise and said, "I don't know how it would work. But I'd be open to it if someone came up with the right concept." Later, Fraser told Pete Hammond that although he does not know any details about a reboot, he was not against returning. On May 11, 2024, series creator and director Stephen Sommers told The Hollywood Reporter that a new installment "would have to be something really special. Of course, I would work with all of those actors again."

On November 4, 2025, it was reported that a fourth film in the Sommers Mummy series was in development, with Matt Bettinelli-Olpin and Tyler Gillett as directors and David Coggeshall writing the screenplay. Fraser and Rachel Weisz were reported to reprise their respective roles as Rick O'Connell and Evelyn Carnahan-O'Connell. The Hollywood Reporter mentioned that the film would disregard the events of Tomb of the Dragon Emperor. In an interview made while promoting Rental Family, Fraser later mentioned it saying "the one I wanted to make…is forthcoming" and that it was time to "give the fans what they want". Later in January 2026 with the Radio Times, however, Fraser seemed to suggest that a fourth film was not guaranteed, though he would want to be involved if there was one. The film was officially confirmed the following month alongside the involvement of Olpin, Gillett, Fraser and Weisz with a May 19, 2028, release date. In late March 2026, it was announced that John Hannah would reprise his role as Jonathan Carnahan. In July, Michael Johnston was in early talks to join the cast. Johnston's casting was confirmed the following month alongside Numan Acar. It was also announced that Arnold Vosloo, Oded Fehr, and Kevin J. O'Connor would return from previous films as Imhotep, Ardeth Bay, and Beni Gabor respectively, despite the death of O'Connor's character in the first film. On October 15, 2026, the film's title was announced as The Mummy: Book of the Dead. A few days later, it was reported that Tara Emad would join the cast.

=== Filming ===
Principal photography began in London and Morocco on September 7, 2026. Vosloo started filming scenes in November.

== Release ==
The Mummy: Book of the Dead is scheduled to be released in the United States on October 15, 2027. It was previously set to release on May 19, 2028.
