= The Mummy: Tomb of the Dragon Emperor =

2008 film by Rob Cohen

- Theatrical release poster
- Directed by: Rob Cohen
- Written by: Alfred Gough; Miles Millar
- Based on: Characters by: Stephen Sommers; Lloyd Fonvielle; Kevin Jarre
- Produced by: Stephen Sommers; Sean Daniel; Bob Ducsay; James Jacks
- Starring: Brendan Fraser; Jet Li; Maria Bello; John Hannah; Russell Wong; Liam Cunningham; Luke Ford; Isabella Leong; Michelle Yeoh
- Cinematography: Simon Duggan
- Edited by: Joel Negron; Kelly Matsumoto
- Music by: Randy Edelman; John Debney (additional music)
- Production companies: Universal Pictures; Relativity Media; The Sommers Company; Alphaville Films
- Distributed by: Universal Pictures
- Release dates: July 24, 2008 (Moscow); August 1, 2008 (United States)
- Running time: 112 minutes
- Country: United States
- Languages: English; Mandarin
- Budget: $145 million
- Box office: $406 million

The Mummy: Tomb of the Dragon Emperor is a 2008 American action adventure film directed by Rob Cohen from a script written by Alfred Gough and Miles Millar. The film is set in China rather than Egypt and focuses on the Terracotta Army's origins. It is the final installment in Stephen Sommers' The Mummy film trilogy and a standalone sequel to The Mummy Returns (2001). It stars Brendan Fraser, Jet Li, Maria Bello (replacing Rachel Weisz, who played Evelyn in the first two films), John Hannah, Luke Ford, Anthony Wong, and Michelle Yeoh.

The Mummy: Tomb of the Dragon Emperor premiered in Moscow on July 24, 2008, and was released in the United States on August 1. The film received negative reviews from critics and grossed $406 million against a production budget of $145 million, becoming the lowest-grossing film in the trilogy. A direct sequel to the second film titled The Mummy: Book of the Dead, is set to be released on October 15, 2027.

== Plot ==
In ancient China, the warlord Qin Shi Huang unified Qin and became the founder of the Qin dynasty, known as the Dragon Emperor. Fearing his death would end all he had accomplished, the Emperor summoned the sorceress Zi Yuan and sent her to a monastery with his second-in-command, General Ming, to find the long-lost Oracle Bones, which hold the key to immortality. When Yuan and Ming fell in love, the Emperor had Ming executed and wounded Yuan out of jealousy. In retaliation, a fleeing Yuan cursed the Emperor and his army, turning them into the Terracotta Army.

In 1946, thirteen years after the deaths of Imhotep and the Scorpion King, (Note: As depicted in The Mummy Returns (2001).) Alex O'Connell, Rick and Evelyn O'Connell's son, and his archaeology professor, Roger Wilson, find the Emperor's tomb. Though attacked by a mysterious woman, they bring the sarcophagus to Shanghai. Meanwhile, the British government entrusts Rick and Evelyn to retrieve a gemstone called the "Eye of Shangri-La" and return it to China. During the Chinese New Year in Shanghai, the reunited O'Connells learn that Wilson works for a rogue military faction led by General Yang and his assistant, Colonel Choi, who provided the financial backing for Alex's expedition. Yang believes the Emperor can lead China out of the chaos following World War II and the Chinese Civil War, resurrecting him using the "Eye of Shangri-La," which contains mystical water. The revived Emperor accepts Yang's services but kills Wilson. The O'Connells try to stop him with the help of Lin, the woman who earlier attacked Alex, but he escapes. Lin reveals that she possesses the only weapon that can kill the Emperor—a cursed dagger.

Along with Evelyn's brother, Jonathan Carnahan, the O'Connells and Lin travel to a stupa in the Himalayas that will reveal the path to Shangri-La. With help from yetis summoned by Lin, the group holds off Yang's forces, but the Emperor discovers Shangri-La's location. The Emperor gravely wounds Rick while Alex triggers an avalanche, slowing the Emperor's pursuit. Lin takes them to Shangri-La, where Zi Yuan still lives. Lin is Yuan's daughter, both rendered immortal by the mystical waters, which Yuan uses to heal Rick's wound. The Emperor and Yang arrive, and he bathes in the waters, restoring his human form and granting him supernatural power. Morphing into a three-headed dragon, he steals the dagger, kidnaps Lin, and flies back to his tomb. The Emperor revives the Terracotta Army for world domination and directs them to breach the Great Wall, after which they will be invincible.

The O'Connells and Yuan pursue the Emperor to the Great Wall, where Yuan, using the Oracle Bones, sacrifices her own and Lin's immortality to raise an undead army of the Emperor's enemies, led by a revived General Ming. As the two undead armies clash, Alex rescues Lin. Yuan fights the Emperor and steals the dagger from him before he mortally wounds her. While dying, she gives the blade to Rick and Alex. The Emperor retreats into the Great Wall, where Alex and Rick confront him while Evelyn and Lin fight Yang and Choi, killing both. Meanwhile, Rick and Alex overpower the Emperor and kill him with the dagger, which destroys the Terracotta Army. Ming and his army celebrate before entering the afterlife.

The O'Connells and Lin return to Shanghai, where Alex and Lin start a relationship. Jonathan takes the Eye of Shangri-La and moves to Peru, not knowing that mummies will soon be found there.

== Cast ==
- Brendan Fraser as Rick O'Connell, a retired adventurer, Evelyn's husband and Alex's father.
- Maria Bello as Evelyn Carnahan-O'Connell, Rick's wife and Alex's mother, also a retired adventurer/librarian turned novelist. She was previously portrayed by Rachel Weisz.
- John Hannah as Jonathan Carnahan, Evelyn's elder brother.
- Russell Wong as General Ming Guo, the Emperor's former second-in-command, Zi Yuan's lover and Lin's father.
- Liam Cunningham as Mad Dog Maguire, a pilot and old friend of Rick who helps the O'Connells make their way to Tibet on their journey to Shangri-La.
- Luke Ford as Alexander Rupert "Alex" O'Connell, Rick's and Evelyn's son, now twenty-one years old, who develops romantic feelings towards Zi Yuan's daughter, Lin. He was previously portrayed by Freddie Boath.
- Isabella Leong as Lin, Alex's love interest, Ming Guo and Zi Yuan's daughter, and the protector of the Emperor's tomb.
- Michelle Yeoh as Zi Yuan, an immortal sorceress whom the Emperor sought in order to obtain the secret to eternal life that she possesses.
- Jet Li as Qin Shi Huang, an evil warlord who desired immortality. Though he becomes immortal, he and his army were mummified alive. Once revived, he seeks to enslave the world.
- Anthony Wong as General Yang, a rogue Kuomintang general who becomes the Emperor's supporter.
- Jessey Meng as Colonel Choi, Yang's assistant.
- David Calder as Professor Roger Wilson, Alex's supporter in his expedition of the Emperor's tomb, but secretly a collaborator with Yang and Choi.
- Albert Kwan as Chu Wah, a worker at the initial dig site who is killed by an acid trap.
- James Bradford as Jameson, Rick and Evelyn's butler.
- Michael Sherer and Scott Taylor as the motion-capture of the yetis that aid the O'Connells in the Himalayas.
- Wu Jing as a unnamed assassin sent to kill Qin Shi Huang (based on Jing Ke)
- Freda Foh Shen as the Narrator.

== Production ==
=== Development ===
In November 2001, director Stephen Sommers, who directed the previous Mummy films, said about directing a third film, "There is a demand for it, but most of the gang would only be up for it again if we could find a way to make it bigger and better." In May 2004 during the release of Van Helsing, he expressed his doubts about having the energy to make a third film, though the cast of previous films had expressed interest in returning. In December 2005, he reviewed a script written by Alfred Gough and Miles Millar, about a Chinese mummy (China's first emperor, who wants to take over the world with his army of accursed warriors in 1940).

The idea of The Emperor and his army is based on the real-life Qin emperor Qin Shi Huang, who was buried amidst thousands of crafted and fired terra cotta soldiers, called the Terracotta Army.

=== Writing ===
An early version of Gough and Millar's script contained many callbacks to the previous films that went unused. The original prologue had Zi Yuan (Zohora) going to Hamunaptra and making a terracotta copy of the Book of the Dead, featuring the puzzle box key from the first film. Instead of the Oracle Bones, Zohora uses the book's terracotta copy to curse the Emperor and his army. The book would also have been used to resurrect the Emperor instead of the Elixir of Life. Jonathan not only named his nightclub after Imhotep but styled the barmaids with Anck-Su-Namun's bodypaint. The Bembridge Scholars that Evy frequently mentioned in the first film would have returned in a minor role. The character Sir Colin Willoughby, the head of the society, would play a role in the Dragon Emperor's resurrection in Wilson's place. In the second film, Meela says three men will "receive their [your] just rewards." The Emperor Mummy says Yang (Okumura) will get his reward when the Emperor conquers the larger world. During the final battle, Alex's slingshot would return to play a vital role in defeating the Emperor. At one point, the producers wanted Imhotep to be in the script where he would have joined the protagonists in defeating the dragon Emperor.

Like the previous films, this early draft contained more body horror elements, including a crocodile eating Okumura's arm, and maggots, bone fragments, and fossilized guts seeping through the Emperor Mummy's wounds. After becoming immortal, the Emperor forms a new brain, eyeball, and skin grafts over his cracked body. In his mummy form, the Dragon Emperor shared a few similarities with Imhotep: they both drain people's lifeforce to heal themselves (in doing so, the Emperor turns his victims into terracotta and shatters them), after draining one character, the Emperor Mummy inherits his victim's blue eyes, like Imhotep did in one scene of the second movie, Just as Imhotep made impressions of his face in sand and water in the first and second films, respectively, the Emperor Mummy similarly forms his face in the snow during the avalanche. The mummification sequence was also more graphic as the Emperor's heart would've become visible through his chest, pumping black blood through his veins and out of his pores. Then molten clay covers his clothes and body before being superheated and hardened by intense white light beams from within him.

The script showed the Emperor as having a more ruthless personality. He sends Zohora to Hamunaptra under the threat of killing her lover Ming Guo (Sun Tzu) if she fails to return within 90 days, only to present her with his head in a box when she does. When he becomes immortal, the Emperor puts a searing finger on Okumura's forehead, and makes him kneel and pledge his loyalty. He kisses Zohora to simultaneously spite and curse her by turning her and the other immortals in Shangri-La into terracotta statues. The curse doesn't affect Lin (Lily Chen) because she's already sacrificed her immortality before the Emperor arrives in Shangri-La. Then, as he takes Lin, the Emperor tells her she will pay for her mother's sins by sharing his bed as his queen. During the climax, the Emperor punishes Okumura for his failure by encasing him in a giant brass lantern.

The script took place in 1940 during World War II instead of afterward. Rick and Evy are introduced in Agra, India, acting as spies for the British government, observing Okumura, believing he has a secret weapon for the Japanese to win the war, later revealed to be the Emperor. With the backdrop of the war, the script shows the tensions between the Chinese and Japanese, with one scene in Imhotep's where Jonathan calms a dispute between the O'Connells friend and Chinese resistance member, Chang, and Japanese Major Suki. Another later had the O'Connells reluctantly forced to stand back and watch Chang get captured by Japanese troops, who collect insurgents and send them on trains to work camps, as Lily previously told Alex. It's revealed that despite Rick and Evy sending Alex to Yale to protect him, he left his first year without their knowledge and failed to enlist in the army before being called by Willoughby to work with him. Unlike the film, the O'Connells learn the Emperor has five days to become immortal after he's awakened, or he'll turn to dust. Later, at a monastery in the Himalayas ransacked by Japanese soldiers, they encounter a Tibetan monk they dub Tequila, who joins the group, leading them to the Temple of Whispering Skulls and accompanying them to the Great Wall. Rather than the Emperor Mummy mortally wounding Rick, Alex would've taken the hit to save his dad.

Other notable differences between the script and film include Shangri-La depicted as a lush utopia filled with people from various eras. The Dragon Emperor showed more of his mastery over the five Chinese elements: he freezes and unfreezes a river to escape, rapidly shoots fireballs from his hands, makes "snow arms" to drag enemies underground, and makes a raincloud with water from the Spring of Eternal Life to raise his army. Unlike in the movie, he doesn't become a shapeshifter. Many Chinese slave workers and other prisoners the Japanese took, including Chang, ward off the Emperor's Terracotta Army instead of undead warriors. Instead of the one-on-one fight between Rick and the Dragon Emperor, the O'Connells try to complete a ritual involving the five elements to unlock the "River of Spirits," the Emperor's enemies' souls beneath the Great Wall, to defeat the terracotta soldiers as the Emperor tries to stop them. Rick tells the Emperor to give Imhotep his regards after delivering the killing blow. The terracotta curse upon Shangri-La ends with the Emperor's death, freeing its inhabitants, including Zohora.

=== Casting ===
In March 2006, actor Oded Fehr, who played Ardeth Bay in the first two films said that Sommers had told him that a third film was in development and being written, with only Brendan Fraser and Rachel Weisz's characters returning. The following September, Universal Pictures offered director Joe Johnston the helm, instead of Jurassic World but Johnston declined. Later in the month, Weisz expressed interest in reprising her role.

In January 2007, Universal announced Sommers would not direct the third film and that Rob Cohen had entered negotiations to take over directing duties. Sommers opted out because he felt "the first two really came together" and that "third ones are just very hard." Later in the month, the story was revealed to center around Brendan Fraser and Rachel Weisz's characters, as well as their adult son. Negotiations with the actors were in progress at that time. In February, casting began for the role of Alex O'Connell. Additionally, John Hannah reprised his role as Jonathan. Also in that month, Cohen mentioned that Jet Li and Michelle Yeoh would star in the film although the official confirmation wasn't published until May.

In April, Brendan Fraser re-joined the cast for the film. Weisz did not, citing "problems with the script" in addition to having just given birth to her son. The film was shot in Montreal and China. The film was originally reported to be titled The Mummy 3: Curse of the Dragon. In April, Luke Ford was cast as Alex O'Connell, replacing Freddie Boath in the role and in May, Maria Bello was cast to replace Weisz in the role of Evelyn. Bello commented during an interview that the new "Evy" is different from the original "Evy." "She has the same name, but she is quite a different character," said Bello. At a news conference in Shanghai, Bello told the audience that Rob Cohen has "created a new Evelyn. In the first two Mummy movies she was all actiony and lovely, but this Evelyn might be a little more... forceful in terms of her martial art skills and shooting skills."

=== Filming ===
Principal photography took place from 27 July 2007 to November 2007 and started at Montreal's Mel's Cite du Cinéma. There, the Eye of Shangri-la scenes were shot by production designer Nigel Phelps. The team then shot on the courtyard set of gateway to Shangri-la. The courtyard was dressed with fake snow, created by effects supervisor Bruce Steinheimer's team.

At the city's ADF stage, Phelps's team created sets of the Terra Cotta mausoleum. Set decorator Anne Kuljian designed 20 different statue heads that were sculpted by 3D Arts team and interchanged between shots. One soldier and horse statue was bought from China, and copies of it as well as "The Dragon Emperor" were made (Jet Li's statue was sculpted by Lucie Fournier, Tino Petronzio, and Nick Petronzio in a workshop in Montreal). Propmaster Kim Wai Chung supervised the making of the horses' bridles and mausoleum ornaments in China. Meanwhile, at Mel's, the brutal battle between the Emperor and Rick was filmed, the first scene shot with Jet Li.

On October 15, 2007, the team moved to China. At Shanghai Studios, a set depicting the city in the 1940s was used for the chase sequence and was shot in three weeks. General Yang's camp was filmed in a Ming village near Tian Mo. At the studio, Chinese cultural advisers aided Cohen in depicting the Qin dynasty language and ceremonies. The O'Connell family's drama scenes were shot in an Egyptian-themed nightclub suitably named "Imhotep's."

The crew frequently had to halt filming when soldiers marched in and near Shanghai. The desert battlefield's setting was actually a training facility for the Chinese army that was leased. Filming also took place in the UK, including at Shepperton Studios and Waddesdon Manor.

=== Visual effects ===
The visual effects were done by two Los Angeles-based VFX houses. Rhythm & Hues Studios (R&H) designed the Yetis and dragons, while Digital Domain handled the battle scenes with the Emperor's terracotta warriors. The pool of water resembling diamonds took Rhythm and Hues eleven months to complete. The A.I. software Massive, used for the Lord of the Rings films, was used to create the undead battle scenes.

Design company Imaginary Forces created the opening title sequence and end titles. IF designers also shot real paint splatters and brushstrokes. To portray an "accurate and historic China," they turned to calligrapher T.Z. Yuan for ink brush writing.

== Music ==
The Mummy: Tomb of the Dragon Emperor (Original Motion Picture Soundtrack)

Soundtrack album by Randy Edelman
- Released: July 29, 2008
- Genre: Soundtrack
- Length: 1:17:28
- Label: Varèse Sarabande VSD-6916

Professional ratings
Review scores
Source	Rating
Allmusic	3.5/5 stars

Most of the film's score was composed by Randy Edelman and performed by the London Symphony Orchestra. The soundtrack features numerous different Chinese and Middle Eastern ethnic instruments along with classic British folklore. The soundtrack was released on July 29, 2008, by Varèse Sarabande label, two days before the film's release. Composer John Debney (who had previously scored the music for the Mummy franchise's spin-off The Scorpion King) provided additional re-scored material for most of the bigger action sequences. The Hollywood Studio Symphony recorded thirty minutes of Debney's music in less than ten hours at the Fox Scoring Stage in July 2008, shortly before the film's release. The soundtrack album features Edelman's score and none of Debney's. The trailer prominently features the cues "Armada" by Two Steps From Hell and "DNA Reactor" by Pfeifer Broz. Music, the latter which also plays at the end of the Harry Potter and the Order of the Phoenix trailer. It also plays Vampire Hunters by Wojciech Kilar, which was used in the trailers of the first and second films. The soundtrack features "The Flower Duet" by Léo Delibes from his opera Lakmé.

The Japanese dub uses "Memories" by Manami Kurose as its image song.

== Marketing ==
The Mummy Movie Prequel: The Rise & Fall of Xango's Ax, a comic book limited series by IDW Publishing, was published to promote the film. The comic explores the relationship between Rick and his son Alex.

Sierra Entertainment made a game version of The Mummy: Tomb of the Dragon Emperor for Wii, PlayStation 2, and Nintendo DS, which was released on July 22, 2008, in North America to mostly negative reviews. Gameloft made game version of The Mummy: Tomb of the Dragon Emperor for mobile phones.

== Reception ==
=== Box office ===
The film premiered in Moscow on July 24, 2008, and had a wide release of 3,760 theatres in North America on August 1, 2008.

The film was the top-grossing film the day it opened, earning $15.2 million (The Dark Knight was in second place with $12 million) on Friday. It did not become number one overall in the box office on opening weekend, claiming only $40.4 million, which allowed The Dark Knight to claim the top spot for the third consecutive week with $42.6 million.

The film scored a bigger success at the international box office where it opened at the first position in 26 of the 28 released markets over the weekend and grossed over $59.5 million in the three-day period. It substantially outpaced comparable openings for The Mummy ($16.7 million) and The Mummy Returns ($21.5 million) in the same markets. The film also set opening records for the distributor in Korea (drawing $13.3 million), Russia ($12.7 million), Spain ($6.7 million), and Thailand. The film total in the United States and Canada stands at $103 million, with a much stronger international intake of $303 million. This brings its worldwide total to $406 million. It is the lowest-grossing film in The Mummy trilogy.

=== Critical response ===
On Rotten Tomatoes, the film has an approval rating of 13%, based on 174 reviews, with an average rating of 3.7/10. The site's critical consensus read, "With middling CG effects and a distinct lack of fun, The Mummy: Tomb of the Dragon Emperor finds the series past its prime." On Metacritic, the film has a weighted average score of 31 out of 100, based on reviews from 33 critics, indicating "generally unfavorable reviews". Audiences polled by CinemaScore gave the film an average grade of "B−" on an A+ to F scale.

Roger Ebert of the Chicago Sun-Times gave the film a positive review, awarding it three stars out of four and remarking, "Now why did I like this movie? It was just plain dumb fun, is why." Ebert also stated that it is the best in the series. Nathan Rabin of The Onion's A.V. Club stated that the film "succeeds largely through sheer excess", albeit within a context that "plods along mechanically through its first hour." William Arnold of Seattle Post-Intelligencer gave a mildly positive review, saying that "anyone in the market for an overblown and totally mindless adventure-comedy will certainly get his money's worth." Dallas movie reviewer Casey C. Corpier said that the film was almost as enjoyable as the original and liked the fact that it delivered what it advertised. Kenneth Turan of the Los Angeles Times said the film "has some good things [but] does not have enough of them to make the third time the charm." Ken Fox of TV Guide called the film "passable popcorn fare". Jennie Punter of The Globe and Mail said the film is "kind of fun, but the twists and turns are all too familiar." Michael Sragow of the Baltimore Sun said the film is "like an Indiana Jones movie without rhythm, wit or personality, just a desperate, headlong pace."

=== Accolades ===
Award	Subject	Nominee	Result
Saturn Awards	Best Horror Film		Nominated
CDG Awards	Best Costume Design – Fantasy	Sanja Milkovic Hays	Nominated
Golden Reel Awards	Best Sound Editing – Dialogue and ADR	Becky Sullivan, Daniel S. Irwin, John C. Stuver and Michelle Pazer	Nominated
National Movie Awards	Best Action/Adventure Film		Nominated
National Movie Awards	Best Male Performance	Brendan Fraser	Nominated
Visual Effects Society Awards	Outstanding Created Environment	Mike Meaker, Richard Mahon, Jason Iverson and Sho Hasegawa	Nominated
BMI Film Awards	Best Music	Randy Edelman	Won

== Home media ==
The film was released on DVD and Blu-ray on December 16, 2008. By mid-2011, excluding Blu-ray sales and DVD rentals, it had sold over 2.5 million copies, totalling US$41,768,192 in revenue.

== Franchise ==
=== Sequel ===
After the film was released, actress Maria Bello stated that another Mummy film will "absolutely" be made and that she had already signed on. Actor Luke Ford was signed on for three more films as well. Universal Pictures later cancelled the film and was instead working on a reboot, titled The Mummy, which was released in 2017.

On October 12, 2022, Brendan Fraser revealed that he's 'open' to revisit the franchise and said "I don't know how it would work. But I'd be open to it if someone came up with the right concept." Later, Fraser told Pete Hammond that although he does not know any details about a reboot, he was not against returning.

On May 11, 2024, Stephen Sommers told The Hollywood Reporter that a new installment "would have to be something really special. Of course, I would work with all of those actors again."

On November 4, 2025, it was reported that a fourth film in the Stephen Sommers series was in development, with Matt Bettinelli-Olpin, Tyler Gillett and David Coggeshall writing the screenplay. Fraser and Weisz are returning to reprise their roles as Rick O'Connell and Evelyn Carnahan-O'Connell. In February 2026, Universal scheduled the film for a release on May 19, 2028, with Fraser and Weisz officially signing on to return. In April 2026, the film is given an earlier release date to October 15, 2027.

=== Reboot ===
A reboot of the franchise, simply titled The Mummy, was released in June 2017 and was intended to be the first installment of the Dark Universe franchise. The film failed both critically and financially, resulting in plans for the Dark Universe being scrapped.
