= Kevin J. O'Connor (actor) =

American actor (born 1963)

- Born: Kevin James O'Connor; November 15, 1963 (age 63); Chicago, Illinois, US
- Education: DePaul University (BFA)
- Years active: 1985–present

Kevin James O'Connor (born November 15, 1963) is an American character actor known for roles in films such as Lord of Illusions, The Mummy, Van Helsing, and There Will Be Blood. He is a favorite of director Stephen Sommers.

== Early life, family and education ==
O'Connor was born and raised in Chicago, Illinois. His father was a policeman and his mother was a schoolteacher. As a youth, O'Connor enjoyed reading novelizations of movies, and watched the old movies on television on channels before cable TV, such as PBS, WGN-TV and Chicago Channel 32.

O'Connor attended Catholic school as a youth. He began performing in stage plays his last years in high school. His first performance was as Nutsy Miller, a minor role, in James Thurber's play The Male Animal.

He attended college at DePaul University in Chicago and trained for the stage at its Goodman School of Drama (now The Theatre School at DePaul University), graduating with his Bachelor of Fine Arts degree in 1985.

== Career ==
O'Connor's first professional role was when Al Franken hired him for a low-budget feature film One More Saturday Night. However, O'Connor's big break was at practically the beginning of his career as high school rebel and beatnik poet Michael Fitzsimmons in Francis Ford Coppola's Peggy Sue Got Married (1986). His next major part was quizzical newspaper reporter Taggerty Hayes in the HBO miniseries Tanner '88 (1988). He portrayed a young Ernest Hemingway in the film The Moderns (1988), had a role as Sammy DeSoto, a bartender turned groom in Steel Magnolias (1989), and a featured role in the erotic thriller Color of Night (1994) which starred Bruce Willis and Jane March. O'Connor starred in John Candy's last film, Canadian Bacon (1995), directed by Michael Moore; he portrayed Roy Boy, a suicidal, eccentric American intent on sabotaging Canada.

O'Connor worked with writer/director Stephen Sommers on the science-fiction adventure Deep Rising (1998). He subsequently appeared in Sommers' projects The Mummy (1999), in which he played the devious, materialistic Beni and was hired without an audition. Later Sommers' projects followed for him: Van Helsing (2004), in which he played Count Dracula's devious servant (and Dr. Frankenstein's former assistant) Igor; and G.I. Joe: The Rise of Cobra (2009), in which he portrayed Doctor Mindbender.

O'Connor had a key supporting role in There Will Be Blood (2007) as Henry, the "brother" of Daniel Day-Lewis's oil man, Daniel Plainview. He reunited with There Will Be Blood director Paul Thomas Anderson for a small role in The Master (2012).

Although he has performed mostly on the big screen, he has acted in TV series such as Birdland (1994), The Others (2000), and Gideon's Crossing (2000–01), and later in The Beast (2009), The Mob Doctor (2012–2013), Chicago P.D. (2014–2015), and the streaming mini-series 11.22.63 (2016) and Catch-22. He has performed on stage at the Steppenwolf and off-Broadway.

He does not consider himself strictly a method actor, although he does have techniques to maintain focus.

== Filmography ==
=== Film ===
| Year | Title | Role | Notes |
|---|---|---|---|
| 1986 | One More Saturday Night | Hood | |
| 1986 | Peggy Sue Got Married | Michael Fitzsimmons | |
| 1988 | Candy Mountain | Julius | |
| 1988 | The Moderns | Ernest Hemingway | |
| 1988 | The Caine Mutiny Court-Martial | Lt. Thomas Keefer | TV movie |
| 1989 | Signs of Life | Eddie Johnson | |
| 1989 | Steel Magnolias | Sammy Desoto | |
| 1990 | Love at Large | Art the farmhand | |
| 1991 | F/X2 | Matt Neely | |
| 1992 | Equinox | Russell Franks | |
| 1992 | Hero | Chucky | |
| 1994 | No Escape | Stephano | |
| 1994 | Color of Night | Casey Heinz | |
| 1995 | Canadian Bacon | Roy Boy | |
| 1995 | Virtuosity | Clyde Reilly | |
| 1995 | Lord of Illusions | Philip Swann | |
| 1996 | Hit Me | Cougar | |
| 1997 | Chicago Cab | Southside Guy | |
| 1997 | The Love Bug | Roddy Martel | TV movie |
| 1997 | Amistad | Missionary | |
| 1998 | Gods and Monsters | Harry | |
| 1998 | Deep Rising | Joey "Toochi" Pantucci | |
| 1998 | Black Cat Run | Hobbs | TV movie |
| 1999 | The Mummy | Beni Gabor | |
| 1999 | Chill Factor | Telstar | |
| 1999 | If... Dog... Rabbit... | Jamie Cooper | |
| 2004 | Van Helsing | Igor | |
| 2006 | Kettle of Fish | Harry | |
| 2007 | Seraphim Falls | Henry | |
| 2007 | Flight of the Living Dead: Outbreak on a Plane | Frank | |
| 2007 | There Will Be Blood | Henry Plainview | |
| 2009 | G.I. Joe: The Rise of Cobra | Doctor Mindbender | Cameo |
| 2012 | The Master | Bill William | |
| 2016 | The Cleanse | Fredericks | |
| 2018 | Widows | Bobby Welsh | |
| 2019 | Buck Run | John Yoder | |
| 2019 | Colewell | Charles | |
| 2019 | Captive State | Kermode | |
| 2020 | Exorcism at 60,000 Feet | Buzz | |
| 2020 | Wish Upon a Unicorn | Willie | |
| 2027 | The Mummy: Book of the Dead | Beni Gabor | Filming |

=== Television ===
| Year | Title | Role | Notes |
|---|---|---|---|
| 1988 | Tanner '88 | Hayes Taggerty | 7 episodes |
| 1991 | Law & Order | Patrick McCarter | Episode: The Troubles |
| 1994 | Birdland | Mr. Horner | 7 episodes |
| 2000 | The Others | Warren Day | 13 episodes |
| 2001 | Gideon's Crossing | Dr. Michael Pirandello | Episode: The Mistake |
| 2004 | Century City | Henry Krell | Episode: A Mind is a Terrible Thing to Lose |
| 2005 | Law & Order: Criminal Intent | Dr. Evan Chapel | Episode: Grow |
| 2009 | The Beast | Harry Conrad | 13 episodes |
| 2012–2013 | The Mob Doctor | Stavos Kazan | 9 episodes |
| 2014–2015 | Chicago P.D. | Commander Fischer | 12 episodes |
| 2016 | 11.22.63 | Yellow-card Man | 5 episodes |
| 2017 | The Blacklist | Calvin Dawson | Episode: The Travel Agency (No. 90) |
| 2019 | Catch-22 | Lt. Colonel Korn | 6 episodes |
| 2019 | On Becoming a God in Central Florida | Roger Penland | 6 episodes |
