= The Mummy: Tomb of the Dragon Emperor (video game) =

2008 video game

- North American cover art
- Developers: Eurocom (PS2 and Wii); A2M (Nintendo DS); Gameloft (Mobile)
- Publisher: Vivendi Games (Note: Released under the Sierra Entertainment brand name.)
- Series: The Mummy
- Platforms: PlayStation 2, Nintendo DS, Wii, mobile game
- Release: NA: July 22, 2008; EU: August 8, 2008; AU: August 28, 2008
- Genre: Action-adventure
- Modes: Single-player, multiplayer

The Mummy: Tomb of the Dragon Emperor is a third-person action adventure video game adaption of film of the same name. The PlayStation 2 and Wii versions of the game were developed by Eurocom, and the Nintendo DS version was developed by Artificial Mind and Movement (or A2M), while the mobile version was developed and published by Gameloft. The game was published by Sierra Entertainment, a subsidiary of Vivendi Games. It was released worldwide in Q3 2008.

== Gameplay ==
The Mummy: Tomb of the Dragon Emperor follows the same plot as the film. The player controls either Rick O'Connell or his son, Alex, from a third-person perspective. The game combines platforming, puzzle-solving, and combat elements into its gameplay, and consists of six levels.

The game's platforming sections, have been compared to those of the Tomb Raider series, and allow the player to perform several acrobatic manoeuvres, such as jumping or shimmying along edges. The player must also evade dangers and traps such as rotating saws or falling debris.

During combat, the game allows the player to switch between gun combat and hand-to-hand combat. The player has a range of melee attacks that can be used against enemies, and can also evade the attacks of enemies. Gun combat features a lock-on system, and the player can use either pistols, shotguns or tommy guns. The game also includes puzzle-solving, in the form of hieroglyphic decoding. Additional unlockables, such as concept art, can be obtained by collecting artifacts hidden throughout the levels.

== Reception ==
Reception

Aggregate score
| Aggregator | Score | | | |
| Aggregator | DS | mobile | PS2 | Wii |
|---|---|---|---|---|
| Metacritic | 43/100 | N/A | 38/100 | 39/100 |

Review scores
| Publication | Score | | | |
| Publication | DS | mobile | PS2 | Wii |
|---|---|---|---|---|
| 1Up.com | N/A | N/A | C− | C− |
| 4Players | N/A | N/A | 37% | N/A |
| GameSpot | 3.5/10 | N/A | 3.5/10 | 3.5/10 |
| GameZone | 4.5/10 | N/A | 3.5/10 | 3.8/10 |
| IGN | 4.5/10 | N/A | 3/10 | 3.5/10 |
| Jeuxvideo.com | 7/20 | N/A | 12/20 | 11/20 |
| NGamer | N/A | N/A | N/A | 36% |
| Official Nintendo Magazine | N/A | N/A | N/A | 48% |
| Pocket Gamer | 4/10 | 3/5 | N/A | N/A |
| The Guardian | N/A | N/A | 2/5 | N/A |
| Variety | N/A | N/A | (unfavorable) | N/A |

The game received "generally unfavorable reviews" on all platforms according to the review aggregation website Metacritic.

Jack DeVries of IGN criticized most aspects of the DS version, specifically "terrible" voiceover work and restrictive gameplay, saying "the game is rigid in its progression to the point of doing absolutely stupid things", but acknowledged that the game had "some decent cinematics". The GameSpot review for the Wii and PS2 versions called the boss battle "unspeakably horrible", but praised "nicely detailed, varied environments". 1UP.com listed "bland melee combat", "zero control of the camera", and "the inability to save during missions" as some of its flaws, but also mentioned that the puzzle-solving "complements the action nicely".
