= Van Helsing (soundtrack) =

Van Helsing: Original Motion Picture Soundtrack

Soundtrack album by Alan Silvestri
- Released: May 4, 2004
- Recorded: 2004
- Genre: Soundtrack
- Length: 43:45
- Label: Decca Records
- Producers: Alan Silvestri, David Bifano

Professional ratings
Review scores
Source	Rating
SoundtrackNet	link
Movie Music UK	link
Filmtracks	link

Van Helsing: Original Motion Picture Soundtrack is the soundtrack album to the 2004 film, composed and conducted by Alan Silvestri. It was released on May 4, 2004, by Decca Records.

== Track listing ==
#	Track name	Musical description	Length
1.	Transylvania 1887	Played over the black-and-white opening of the film, this short track mostly features Count Dracula's theme, a brutally rhythmic idea with powerful brass and choral chanting. It ends in an action theme that segues straight into the next track.	1:26
2.	Burn It Down!	Burn It Down! is an action piece played during the scene, still in black and white, in which the mill is burned and Frankenstein's monster falls into the flames holding his creator's body. It states some of Silvestri's action ideas in choral, orchestral and percussive majesty. These include the theme for Frankenstein's monster and another statement of Dracula's theme.	4:46
3.	Werewolf Trap	Werewolf Trap is a short action piece for the scene in which Velkan and Anna Valerious try to imprison The Wolfman.	1:53
4.	Journey to Transylvania	Journey to Transylvania is the first statement of Van Helsing's theme, a fast-paced, powerful and percussive motif in 5/4 that features a rambling acoustic guitar under a six-note repeating pattern performed either by strings or choir. The five-note theme itself blasts out over the top, usually on French horn. It is played during Van Helsing and Carl's voyage by sea and land to Transylvania.	1:33
5.	Attacking Brides	Attacking Brides is a lengthy action suite played when Dracula's brides attack the Transylvanian village and are fought off by Van Helsing. It features the brides' own theme, a brassy one over a pounding percussive beat, at about 2:00.	5:02
6.	Dracula's Nursery	Dracula's Nursery, accompanying Van Helsing and Anna's sneak through Castle Dracula, is a piece that switches between suspenseful, ambiental effects and a playfully devious, waltz-like subtheme for Dracula that film score reviewers, such as Christian Clemmenson, have compared to Elliot Goldenthal's music for Batman Forever. It ends with another statement of Dracula's main theme.	5:47
7.	Useless Crucifix	Useless Crucifix plays during Van Helsing's first confrontation with Dracula and his ensuing escape with Anna from Castle Dracula. It features the debut of a heroic, swashbuckling theme that stands out from the other, more darkly gothic themes. Some listeners have commented (on Filmtracks.com, for example) that this theme sounds like what Alan Silvestri might have composed for Pirates of the Caribbean: The Curse of the Black Pearl had he not been replaced by Klaus Badelt.	2:35
8.	Transylvanian Horses	Transylvanian Horses is the action piece that is played during Van Helsing's attempted escape by carriage from Transylvania, and his ensuing fight with The Wolfman and Dracula's brides. It opens with Van Helsing's theme, pauses for some suspenseful music before moving into action that expands on the swashbuckling theme from Useless Crucifix.	3:55
9.	All Hallow's Eve Ball	All Hallow's Eve Ball, played during the ball scene in Budapest, begins with a source cue, a slow, spooky waltz featuring female vocals and cello solos, before expanding into a short, fully orchestral waltz that then segues into more action material.	3:01
10.	Who Are They to Judge?	Who Are They to Judge?, the title taken from one of Van Helsing's lines, plays during Dracula's kidnapping of Frankenstein's monster and features the latter's theme for the first time since Burn It Down!. It ends with a dramatic cue, almost romantic in nature, hinted at in Attacking Brides, that seems to represent Van Helsing's anguish at becoming a werewolf.	2:00
11.	Final Battle	As the title suggests, Final Battle is the film's longest action piece, featuring a lengthy, relentless recap of all the film's action themes, including Dracula's, Frankenstein's, the brides' and the swashbuckling theme.	6:28
12.	Reunited	Reunited, a respite from the action, is the music played as Van Helsing stands on the cliff and sees Anna in heaven, as well as Frankenstein's monster sailing off on his raft. It introduces a new theme, a love theme for Van Helsing and Anna, that is performed on solo horn and strings, with a powerful variation following with some heartbeat-resembling deep percussion. A final statement of Van Helsing's theme completes the album.	4:23

== Critical reception ==
Generally well received by fans and critics alike, three major score-reviewing websites all rated it at four out of five stars. Movie Music UK's Peter Simons said that Silvestri has delivered "what may be the loudest score of the year", but that he "makes this kind of music sound good...[infusing] the score with a textural richness and compositional quality that is quite rare these days". He admitted that "the score is unbelievably loud and hyperactive with virtually no moments of rest", dryly remarking that "a free bottle of aspirin may have been more appropriate" as a freebie than the offered mini poster.

On Soundtrack.Net, Dan Goldwasser called the score "one heck of an album", saying of Transylvania 1887 especially: "It's grand, it's epic, and it's a great start to the album". He also pointed out that "the sequencing of the album leaves just a little to be desired", bemoaning the scant treatment of the love theme that "factored so heavily in the film".

Filmtracks.com editor Christian Clemmenson praised the score for "allowing the force of a full orchestra and adult choir to set a high standard for summer action once again" and particularly enjoyed the cue Reunited, which he described as "nothing less than lovely". Like the other two reviewers, he pointed out the lack of softer underscore on the album, but also said that Van Helsing's guitar-accompanied theme "sounds remarkably strange in context" and that Silvestri broke a fundamental rule of film scoring by giving the title character the weakest theme. His summary was that "Van Helsing is one monumentally bold and wickedly exciting work", however.

== Additional credits ==
Besides Alan Silvestri, who co-produced the album in addition to composing it, these additional credits are given on the back of the CD cover:

Produced by:

- David Bifano

Orchestrated by:

- Mark McKenzie
- William Ross
- David Slonaker

Special Vocal Performances:

- Deborah Dietrich

Mixed and Recorded by:

- Dennis Sands

Edited by:

- Kenneth Karman

The orchestra used was the Hollywood Studio Orchestra, while the choral sections were provided by the Hollywood Film Chorale.
