= Luke Ford =

Australian actor (born 1981)

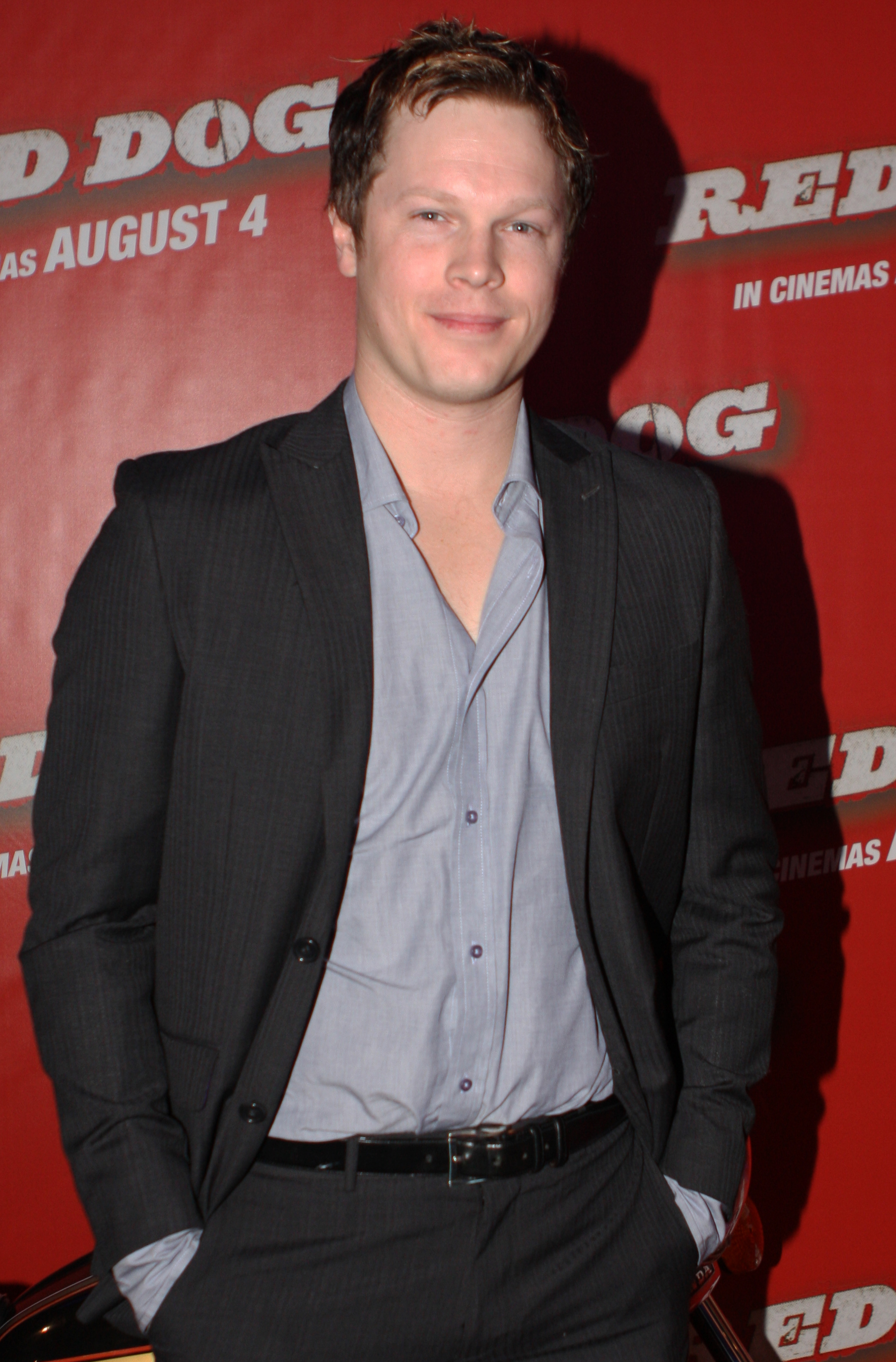
- Ford in August 2011
- Born: Vancouver, British Columbia, Canada
- Education: Parramatta Marist High School (1999)
- Occupation: Actor
- Years active: 2000–present
- Known for: The Mummy: Tomb of the Dragon Emperor (2008); The Black Balloon (2008); Animal Kingdom (2010)

Luke Ford is a Canadian-born Australian actor, known for his roles in The Mummy: Tomb of the Dragon Emperor (2008), The Black Balloon (2008) and Animal Kingdom (2010).

== Early life ==
Ford was born in Vancouver, British Columbia, Canada, while his father was studying at university. Shortly thereafter, the family travelled to the UK before relocating to Australia, when he was one and a half. He was raised in Sydney, where he grew up in the suburb of Castle Hill and attended Parramatta Marist High School in Westmead, graduating in 1999. He once worked at the Winston Hills Hotel, and did a short stint at Universal Magazines in North Ryde.

Ford studied acting at The Actor's Pulse in Sydney, becoming one of the school's earliest graduates. He later returned to teach the Meisner technique when he was between film roles. He has since, also taught at Sydney Acting Studio.

== Career ==
Ford began acting professionally with a string of performances on Australian television, starting with a guest-starring role on Water Rats, followed by a recurring role on McLeod's Daughters, for which he was shortlisted for a 'Best New Talent' Logie Award for his recurring role of Craig Woodland.

Guest roles followed in Home and Away, Stingers, Breakers and All Saints. He appeared in 2002 TV movie The Junction Boys alongside Tom Berenger and Ryan Kwanten, as Iphicles in the NBC miniseries Hercules, and had a role in the short-lived Australian series HeadLand, playing Seth Baxter.

Ford's film career began with the release of the Australian film Kokoda in 2006, delivering a performance as Burke, a slain soldier on the Kokoda Trail.

Next came 2008 drama film The Black Balloon opposite Toni Collette, for which his performance won him an Australian Film Institute Award for Best Supporting Actor that same year. In the film, Ford plays Charlie, a teenager with autism. Ford spent six months researching the role, including taking to the streets of Sydney in character to determine the effectiveness of his characterisation. The Black Balloon premiered at the Berlin International Film Festival, where it won the Crystal Bear award.

Immediately following The Black Balloon, Ford signed on to star in the third instalment of the Mummy film series, The Mummy: Tomb of the Dragon Emperor opposite Brendan Fraser and Maria Bello. In the film, Ford plays Alex O'Connell, son of Fraser's Rick O'Connell and Bello's Evelyn O'Connell. The film was released in the US on 1 August 2008 and grossed $403 million worldwide.

In 2009, Ford had roles in TV film 3 Acts of Murder playing Snowy Rowles and British sci-fi film Ghost Machine, playing Vic, opposite Rachael Taylor.

The following year, he appeared in the critically-acclaimed David Michôd film Animal Kingdom, alongside Ben Mendelsohn, Joel Edgerton and Guy Pearce, in which he played Darren, the youngest of three brothers in a Melbourne crime family being hunted by the police.

In 2011, Ford had roles in several Australian films, including the award-winning Kriv Stenders family film Red Dog and Michael Rymer's drama film Face to Face (an adaptation of the David Williamson play of the same name), playing opposite Vince Colosimo, Sigrid Thornton and Matthew Newton as explosive character Wayne. For the latter, he won the 2011 Best Actor Award at Le Festival Des Antipodes and was nominated for Best Actor (ensemble cast) at the 2011 Inside Film Awards. The same year, Ford appeared on stage in a production of Summer of the Seventeenth Doll for Sydney's Belvoir Street Theatre, playing the role of Johnnie Dowd.

Ford next had a lead role in Rolf De Heer's 2012 feature The King Is Dead! opposite Dan Wylie and Bojana Novakovic and the following year starred opposite David Gulpilil in Charlie's Country, which was written especially for him by De Heer. In 2014, he appeared in TV movie Parer's War, sci-fi feature Infini and filmed a lead role in The Body in the Yard.

That same year, Ford won an AACTA Award for Best Guest or Supporting Actor in a Television Drama for his turn as Kerry Packer in 2013 miniseries Power Games: The Packer–Murdoch War. He then appeared opposite Sam Worthington in 2015 war miniseries Deadline Gallipoli.

Ford's further television credits include the TV movie Blood in the Sand, 2012 miniseries Bikie Wars: Brothers in Arms (playing Snow, a Comanchero member) and 2013 miniseries Underbelly: Squizzy. He starred opposite Elizabeth Perkins in the TV movie Hercules and had a role in 2015 miniseries Catching Milat. He also appeared in romantic comedy What if it Works? as Adrian, a character who has obsessive-compulsive disorder, and 2016 sci-fi film The Osiris Child: Science Fiction Volume One, alongside Isabel Lucas, Kellan Lutz, Temuera Morrison and Rachel Griffiths.

In 2017, Ford appeared in the second season of Cleverman.

Ford played the role of Ash in 2022 action thriller feature Avarice. His most recent film credits include horror The Moogai and martial arts film Life After Fighting, both in 2024.

== Awards ==
Year	Work	Award	Category	Result	Ref.
	McLeod's Daughters	Logie Award	Best New Talent	Shortlisted	
2008	The Black Balloon	Australian Film Institute Award	Best Supporting Actor	Won	
2011	Face to Face	Le Festival Des Antipodes	Best Actor Award	Won	
2011	Face to Face	Inside Film Awards	Best Actor (Ensemble Cast)	Nominated	
2013	Power Games: The Packer–Murdoch War	AACTA Award	Best Guest or Supporting Actor in a Television Drama	Won	

== Filmography ==
=== Films ===
Year	Title	Role	Notes
2006	Kokoda	Burke	
2008	The Black Balloon	Charlie Mollison	AACTA Award for Best Actor in a Supporting Role
2008	The Mummy: Tomb of the Dragon Emperor	Alex O'Connell	Replaced Freddie Boath from The Mummy Returns
2009	Ghost Machine	Vic	
2010	Animal Kingdom	Darren Cody	
2011	Red Dog	Thomas Baker	
2011	Driver	Alek	Short film
2011	Face to Face	Wayne Travers	Le Festival Des Antipodes Best Actor Award
2012	The King is Dead	Shrek	
2013	Charlie's Country	Policeman Luke	
2015	Infini	Chester Huntington	
2015	Nothing to Declare	Lenny	
2016	The Osiris Child: Science Fiction Volume One	Bill	
2017	What If It Works?	Adrian McKinnon	
2018	Emmanuel	Brother John	Short film
2018	A Suburban Love Story	Brett	
2018	Road Train	Sergeant Day	
2022	Avarice	Ash	
2024	The Moogai	White Man #1	
2024	Life After Fighting	Victor Dimov	
2025	It Will Find You	Josh Baker	
TBA	Lotus	TBA	In development
TBA	Other You	Jerry Flinders / Bill Flinders	Post-production
TBA	Spare Me	Michael	Pre-production
TBA	The True Story	TBA	In development
TBA	Wake Up Dead	Crosby	In development

=== Television ===
Year	Title	Role	Notes
2000	Water Rats	Harley Strachan	Episode: "Family Ties"
2000	Home and Away	JT Hanson	3 episodes
2001	Stingers	Craig Williams	Episode: "Just Another Day"
2001–2004	McLeod's Daughters	Craig Woodland	22 episodes
2002	The Junction Boys	Perch	TV movie
2002	All Saints	Leon Fahey	Episode: "Overload"
2004	All Saints	Ray Branal	Episode: "Bad Seed"
2005	Hercules	Iphicles	Miniseries, 2 episodes
2005	headLand	Seth Baxter	5 episodes
2009	3 Acts of Murder	Snowy Rowles	TV movie
2010	Nomads	Zack	TV movie
2012	Bikie Wars: Brothers in Arms	Snow	Miniseries, 6 episodes
2013	Underbelly: Squizzy	Albert 'Tankbuster' McDonald	Miniseries, 8 episodes
2013	Power Games: The Packer–Murdoch War	Kerry Packer	Miniseries, 2 episodes AACTA Award for Best Guest or Supporting Actor in a Television Drama
2014	Parer’s War	Ronnie Williams	TV movie
2015	Deadline Gallipoli	Charlie Hodson	Miniseries, 2 episodes
2015	Catching Milat	Inspector Bob Godden	Miniseries, 2 episodes
2017	Cleverman	Tim Dolan	6 episodes
2017–2019	The Other Guy	Henry	5 episodes
2020	Halifax: Retribution	Neil	1 episode
2021	Amazing Grace	Paul	8 episodes
2021	Fires	Panicked Man on Phone (voice)	Miniseries, 1 episode
2024	Last King of the Cross	Valentine Bracks	1 episode
2025	Ten Pound Poms	Clive	1 episode
TBA	Ambos for Hire	Marty	In development

=== Video games ===
Year	Title	Role	Notes
2008	The Mummy: Tomb of the Dragon Emperor	Alex O'Connell	Voice
