= Van Helsing (film) =

2004 film by Stephen Sommers

- Theatrical release poster
- Directed by: Stephen Sommers
- Written by: Stephen Sommers
- Based on: Dracula by Bram Stoker; Frankenstein by Mary Shelley; The Wolf Man by George Waggner
- Produced by: Stephen Sommers; Bob Ducsay
- Starring: Hugh Jackman; Kate Beckinsale; Richard Roxburgh; David Wenham; Will Kemp; Kevin J. O'Connor; Shuler Hensley
- Cinematography: Allen Daviau
- Edited by: Bob Ducsay; Kelly Matsumoto
- Music by: Alan Silvestri
- Production companies: Sommers Company; Stillking Films
- Distributed by: Universal Pictures
- Release date: May 7, 2004
- Running time: 131 minutes
- Countries: United States; Czech Republic
- Language: English
- Budget: $160–170 million
- Box office: $300.2 million

Van Helsing is a 2004 action horror film written and directed by Stephen Sommers. It stars Hugh Jackman as monster hunter Van Helsing and Kate Beckinsale as Anna Valerious. Van Helsing is an homage to the Universal Horror Monster films from the 1930s and 1940s (also produced by Universal Pictures which were in turn partially based on novels by Bram Stoker and Mary Shelley), of which Sommers is a fan.

Van Helsing was inspired by the Dutch vampire hunter Abraham Van Helsing from Irish author Bram Stoker's novel Dracula. Distributed by Universal Pictures, the film includes a number of monsters such as Count Dracula (and other vampires), Frankenstein's monster, Duergar, Mr. Hyde and werewolves in a way similar to the multi-monster movies that Universal produced in the 1940s, such as Frankenstein Meets the Wolf Man, House of Frankenstein and House of Dracula. The film grossed $300.2 million worldwide against a budget of $160–170 million but was not well received by critics.

== Plot ==
In 1887 Transylvania, Doctor Victor Frankenstein, aided by his assistant Igor and Count Dracula, creates a monster. Dracula kills Frankenstein when he refuses to go along with the vampire's designs for the creature as Igor, revealed to be under Dracula's pay, watches impassively. As a mob storms the castle, the monster flees to a windmill with Frankenstein's body. The mob burns down the windmill, seemingly killing the monster. A year later, in 1888, Gabriel Van Helsing, a monster hunter who works for the Knights of the Holy Order, an organization that protects mankind, travels to Notre-Dame de Paris and kills Dr. Jekyll after a brawl with Mr. Hyde. Van Helsing remembers nothing before he was found on the steps of a church nearly dead, and hopes to earn pardon for his forgotten sins and regain his memory.

At the Order's Vatican City headquarters, Van Helsing is tasked with traveling to Transylvania, destroying Dracula, and protecting Anna and Velkan Valerious, the last of an ancient Romanian family. Their ancestor vowed that his descendants would kill Dracula or spend eternity in Purgatory. In Transylvania, Anna and Velkan attempt to kill a werewolf controlled by Dracula, but it falls with Velkan into a gorge, biting him as Velkan shoots it with a silver bullet.

Van Helsing and Friar Carl, a weapons inventor, arrive at a village and join Anna's fight with Dracula's brides – Verona, Marishka, and Aleera – slaying Marishka in the process. That night, Velkan visits Anna to warn her of Dracula's plans but transforms into a werewolf and escapes. Van Helsing and Anna pursue Velkan to Frankenstein's castle. They stumble upon Dracula's plan to duplicate Frankenstein's experiments to give life to thousands of his undead children, using Velkan as a conduit.

During the fray, Dracula confronts Van Helsing, whom he regards as an ancient rival. Dracula's spawns come to life before dying due to the lack of Frankenstein's original formula. Van Helsing and Anna escape and, at the windmill, stumble upon Frankenstein's monster, who reveals that he is the key to Frankenstein's machine giving life to Dracula's brood. Eavesdropping on their discussion, Velkan escapes with this new information.

While attempting to bring the monster to Rome, Van Helsing and his crew are ambushed by the brides and Velkan, near Budapest. Verona and Velkan are killed, but Van Helsing is bitten by the latter. Aleera kidnaps Anna and offers to trade her for the monster at a masquerade ball tomorrow night, the day before All Saints' Day (that is, Halloween night, October 31st). Van Helsing locks the monster in a crypt, but Dracula's allies retrieve him. Van Helsing and Carl rescue Anna and escape from the masquerade guests, who are revealed to be vampires.

At Anna's castle, Carl explains that Dracula is the son of Valerious the Elder. When Dracula was killed in 1462 by the "Left Hand of God", Dracula made a pact with the Devil and lived again. Valerious was told to kill Dracula and gain salvation for his entire family. Unable to kill his son, he imprisoned him in an icy fortress. A fragment of a painting, which the Cardinal gave Van Helsing back in Vatican City, opens a path to Dracula's castle.

They find the monster, who reveals that Dracula possesses a cure for lycanthropy because only a werewolf can kill him. Van Helsing, fighting the curse, sends Anna and Carl to retrieve the cure, killing Igor in the process. Van Helsing attempts to free the monster but is struck by lightning, bringing Dracula's children to life. Dracula and Van Helsing turn into their bestial forms and battle, while Frankenstein's monster helps Anna escape Aleera. Anna then kills Aleera with Carl's help. Whilst both return to their human forms, Dracula implies that Van Helsing is the Archangel Gabriel, known as the "Left Hand of God", who killed him, and offers to restore his memory. Van Helsing refuses and kills Dracula after reverting to his werewolf form, triggering his brood's deaths. Anna injects the cure into Van Helsing but is accidentally killed by him in the process.

Van Helsing and Carl cremate Anna's body on a cliff overlooking the sea. Frankenstein's monster leaves for parts unknown, and Van Helsing sees Anna's spirit reuniting with her family in Heaven. Van Helsing and Carl ride off into the sunset.

== Cast ==
- Hugh Jackman as Gabriel Van Helsing, a legendary hunter of monsters
- Kate Beckinsale as Anna Valerious, the last descendant of an ancient Romanian family
- Richard Roxburgh as Count Vladislaus Dracula, a powerful vampire
- David Wenham as Carl, a friar of the Holy Order
- Shuler Hensley as Frankenstein's monster
- Kevin J. O'Connor as Igor, a servant of Frankenstein's, now working for Dracula
- Will Kemp as Velkan Valerious, Anna's brother, who is turned into a werewolf
- Elena Anaya as Aleera, one of Dracula's brides
- Silvia Colloca as Verona, one of Dracula's brides
- Josie Maran as Marishka, one of Dracula's brides
- Alun Armstrong as Cardinal Jinette, Van Helsing's superior in the Holy Order
- Tom Fisher as the Undertaker
- Samuel West as Victor Frankenstein
- Stephen Fisher as Dr. Henry Jekyll
- Robbie Coltrane as the voice of Mr. Hyde

== Production ==
Universal Pictures wanted to reinvent their iconic movie monsters and wanted to replicate the formula that had worked for both The Mummy (1999) and The Mummy Returns (2001). This was not only attempted by bringing on Stephen Sommers as the director but also with the release date of May 7, 2004, which was five years to the date after The Mummy opened in 1999. The Mummy took the classic monster in an action-adventure tone, so it made sense to do the same with Van Helsing. While The Mummy was much inspired by Indiana Jones, Van Helsing drew heavily from James Bond films.

Richard Roxburgh, who was cast as Dracula, said that he loved the old Universal monster films, Klaus Kinski's Nosferatu and Gary Oldman's Dracula and in general likes "the dark, sad, kind of naïve, Germanic type of monster movie". About his physical transformation for the role, Roxburgh said that "it's a pretty significant physical transformation. There is obviously darker hair and I wanted a sense of a Romany king or leader, a faded aristocrat. I liked that gypsy element. So the character looks nothing like me".

== Soundtrack ==
The film's original soundtrack was composed by Alan Silvestri.

== Merchandise ==
=== Video game ===
Vivendi Universal Games published a Van Helsing video game for PlayStation 2, Xbox, and Game Boy Advance. The game follows a similar plot to the film, has gameplay similar to Devil May Cry, and the PS2 and Xbox versions feature the voice talent of many of the actors including Hugh Jackman.

=== Slot games ===
Van Helsing also features in a slot game produced by International Game Technology. The game is available in real-world casinos and online, though users in Argentina, Australia, Canada, China, France, Germany, Israel, Italy, Netherlands, Nigeria, Norway, Russia, South Africa, Thailand, Turkey, and the US are excluded from playing the online games.

== Reception ==
=== Box office ===
The film earned $51 million at #1 during the opening weekend of May 7–9, 2004. The film eventually grossed $120 million in North America and $180 million internationally for a worldwide total of $300 million.

=== Critical reception ===
Van Helsing received mostly negative reviews from critics. On the review aggregation website Rotten Tomatoes, 24% of 225 critics' reviews are positive, with an average rating 4.3/10. The website's consensus reads, "A hollow creature feature that suffers from CGI overload". Metacritic, which uses a weighted average, assigned the film a score of 35 out of 100, based on 38 critics, indicating "generally unfavorable" reviews. Audiences polled by CinemaScore gave the film an average grade of "B" on an A+ to F scale. James Berardinelli of ReelViews gave an extremely negative review, rating the film half a star out of four and calling it "the worst would-be summer blockbuster since Battlefield Earth". Furthermore, he wrote: "There are quite a few unintentionally funny moments, although the overall experience was too intensely painful for me to be able to advocate it as being "so bad, it's good". ... Some, however, will doubtless view it as such. More power to them, since sitting through this movie requires something more than a strong constitution and a capacity for self-torture". Bill Muller of The Arizona Republic gave it a rating of two out of five, explaining that the film "looks like a movie assembled by a room full of computer geeks munching Doritos and playing Wolfenstein in between stints of designing Dracula's fangs". Bob Longino of The Atlanta Constitution gave the film a C−, describing it as "stuffed with enough over-the-top computer effects to choke George Lucas".

Mick LaSalle of the San Francisco Chronicle greatly disliked the film: "Writer-director Stephen Sommers (...) throws together plot strains from various horror movies and stories and tries to muscle things along with flash and dazzle. But his film just lies there, weighted down by a complete lack of wit, artfulness and internal logic. ... What Sommers tries to do here is use action as the only means of involving an audience. So story is sacrificed. Character development is nonexistent, and there are no attempts to incite emotion. Instead, Sommers tries to hold an audience for two hours with nothing up his sleeve but colored ribbons, bright sparklers and a kazoo. What he proves is that this is no way to make movies". Roger Ebert of the Chicago Sun-Times gave the film 3 stars out of 4 stating that "at the outset, we may fear Sommers is simply going for f/x overkill, but by the end, he has somehow succeeded in assembling all his monsters and plot threads into a high-voltage climax. Van Helsing is silly, spectacular and fun".

=== Accolades ===
Award	Subject	Nominee	Result
Saturn Awards	Best Horror Film		Nominated
Saturn Awards	Best Costume Design	Gabriella Pescucci, Carlo Poggioli	Nominated
Saturn Awards	Best Make-Up	Greg Cannom, Steve LaPorte	Nominated
Saturn Awards	Best Special Effects	Scott Squires, Ben Snow, Daniel Jeannette, Syd Dutton	Nominated
Saturn Awards	Best Music	Alan Silvestri	Won
Teen Choice Awards	Choice Action Movie		Nominated
Teen Choice Awards	Choice Thriller Movie		Nominated
Teen Choice Awards	Choice Movie Actor: Drama/Action Adventure	Hugh Jackman	Nominated
Teen Choice Awards	Choice Movie Actress: Drama/Action Adventure	Kate Beckinsale (also for Underworld)	Nominated
Teen Choice Awards	Choice Movie Fight/Action Sequence	Hugh Jackman vs. Richard Roxburgh	Nominated
Visual Effects Society	Outstanding Special Effects in Service to Visual Effects in a Motion Picture	Geoff Heron, Chad Taylor	Nominated
Stinkers Bad Movie Awards	Worst Film		Nominated
Stinkers Bad Movie Awards	Worst Actress	Kate Beckinsale	Nominated
Stinkers Bad Movie Awards	Worst Female Fake Accent	Kate Beckinsale	Nominated
Stinkers Bad Movie Awards	Worst Male Fake Accent	Richard Roxburgh	Won

== Spin-offs ==
Sommers expanded the story of Van Helsing in two direct spin-offs:

- The animated prequel titled Van Helsing: The London Assignment takes place before the main events of the film, focusing on Van Helsing's mission to try to stop Dr. Jekyll and Mr. Hyde from terrorizing London.
- There is also a one-shot comic book, published by Dark Horse Comics, titled Van Helsing: From Beneath the Rue Morgue, that follows Van Helsing on a self-contained adventure that occurs during the events of the film, just after the death of Jekyll/Hyde in Paris but before Van Helsing returns to Rome. In the adventure, Van Helsing deals with Doctor Moreau and his hybrid mutants.
- In April 2004, a month before Van Helsing opened in theaters, Universal Pictures announced a television series titled Transylvania. The plan was to use the set from the original film, and Universal Pictures paid to maintain the structures so that they could return to film there, and the series was planned to premiere on NBC in the fall of 2004. Just two weeks into Van Helsing's release, the studio canceled the plans for the television series.

== Future ==
=== Cancelled sequel ===
Universal Pictures was confident that Van Helsing would be a hit at the box office, and they began development on a sequel before the first film opened. They even paid to keep the original Transylvania sets, as they figured they would need to come back for it and other projects. Although the film made a profit at the box office, it still failed to meet expectations which caused any plans for the sequel to be scrapped.

=== Reboot ===
In May 2012, Universal Pictures announced a reboot of the film with Alex Kurtzman and Roberto Orci to produce a modern reimagining and Tom Cruise to star as the title character and also produce the film. In October, Rupert Sanders entered early negotiations to direct the film. By November 2015, Jon Spaihts and Eric Heisserer signed onto the project as co-screenwriters, though Cruise left his role with the film. In the following year, Cruise was cast to appear in Kurtzman's The Mummy, which was released in theaters on June 9, 2017. Following the poor critical and financial reception to the film, Universal restructured their plan for rebooted adaptations of their Classic Monsters to be standalone in nature.

By December 2020, the reboot was back in development. Julius Avery was hired as director, in addition to doing a rewrite of an original script by Eric Pearson. James Wan was attached to serve as producer. The project is a joint production venture between Universal Pictures and Atomic Monster.

== See also ==
- Universal Monsters
- Vampire films
- List of vampire films
- List of films featuring Frankenstein's monster
- Werewolf fiction
- The League of Extraordinary Gentlemen
