= The Mummy Returns =

2001 film by Stephen Sommers

- Theatrical release poster
- Directed by: Stephen Sommers
- Written by: Stephen Sommers
- Based on: Characters by: Stephen Sommers; Lloyd Fonvielle; Kevin Jarre
- Produced by: Sean Daniel; James Jacks
- Starring: Brendan Fraser; Rachel Weisz; John Hannah; Arnold Vosloo; Oded Fehr; Patricia Velásquez; The Rock
- Cinematography: Adrian Biddle
- Edited by: Bob Ducsay; Kelly Matsumoto
- Music by: Alan Silvestri
- Production company: Alphaville Films
- Distributed by: Universal Pictures
- Release date: May 4, 2001
- Running time: 129 minutes
- Country: United States
- Language: English
- Budget: $98 million
- Box office: $444.1 million

The Mummy Returns is a 2001 American action-adventure film written and directed by Stephen Sommers. It is the sequel to the 1999 film The Mummy, and the second in The Mummy film series. Brendan Fraser, Rachel Weisz, John Hannah, Arnold Vosloo, Oded Fehr, and Patricia Velásquez reprise their roles from the previous film, with Dwayne Johnson (credited under his ring name "The Rock") joining the cast in his film acting debut.

The film was released in the United States on May 4, 2001, by Universal Pictures. Like its predecessor, The Mummy Returns was a commercial success, grossing $444 million worldwide, becoming the seventh-highest-grossing film of 2001 and the highest-grossing film of the series. The film received mixed reviews from critics. It was followed by a 2002 prequel film, The Scorpion King and a 2008 indirect sequel, The Mummy: Tomb of the Dragon Emperor. A direct sequel titled The Mummy: Book of the Dead is set to be released on October 15, 2027.

== Plot ==
In 3067 B.C., a warrior known as the Scorpion King leads an army to conquer the world. However, they are eventually defeated, and he is exiled to the desert of Ahm Shere. Dying, the King offers Anubis his soul in return for the power to defeat his enemies. Anubis accepts, conjuring an oasis and golden pyramid, and giving the King an army of jackal-like warriors to conquer Egypt. However, once his task is finished, Anubis claims his soul, and the army is returned to the Underworld.

In 1933 A.D., nine years after the defeat of Imhotep, (Note: As depicted in The Mummy (1999).) Rick O'Connell and his wife, Evelyn, explore ancient ruins with their son, Alex, finding the Bracelet of Anubis. In London, Alex plays with the bracelet, which locks onto his wrist, showing him visions that lead to Ahm Shere. Evelyn is kidnapped by a cult who resurrect Imhotep with the Book of the Dead, wishing to use his power to defeat the King; this would give them command of Anubis's army.

The cult, led by museum curator Baltus Hafez, includes enforcer Lock-Nah and Meela Nais, the physical reincarnation of Imhotep's love Anck-su-namun. Rick and Alex set out to rescue Evelyn with the help of her brother Jonathan, who had gotten his hands on a golden scepter, and the Medjai Ardeth Bay, who has returned to help them.

Rick frees Evelyn before she is sacrificed and they fight against Imhotep. Meanwhile, Alex is kidnapped and forced to lead the cult with the bracelet. The O'Connells pursue them with Rick's associate Izzy. En route, Alex secretly leaves clues for his parents, who follow in Izzy's dirigible.

Imhotep uses the Book to restore Anck-su-namun's soul into Meela's body. By doing so, he unwittingly allows Evelyn to unlock the memories of her previous life as Princess Nefertiri, the bracelet's keeper.

At the edge of the Oasis, Imhotep realizes that they are being pursued and uses his powers to attack the dirigible. The dirigible eventually crashes into the oasis's jungle, and Izzy chooses to stay behind to repair it. The O'Connells, Ardeth, Alex, and the cult are eventually attacked by pygmy mummies. Rick retrieves Alex while Ardeth kills Lock-Nah.

They escape from the pygmies, who kill all of the cult members except for Hafez, Imhotep, and Anck-su-namun. Rick and Alex race to the pyramid before the sun light reaches it, saving Alex's life and allowing the bracelet to release his hand. Anck-su-namun, Imhotep, and Hafez then arrive and kill Evelyn before entering the pyramid.

Inside the pyramid, Imhotep loses his powers and is forced to face the King as a mortal. Hafez uses the bracelet to conjure Anubis's army, which appears in the desert outside of the Oasis; Ardeth and the Medjai arrive and begin battle. Rick finds Imhotep summoning the King and attacks him. The King, now an enormous scorpion monster, interrupts the fight. Imhotep tricks him into attacking Rick. While Rick and the King fight, Hafez is caught in the melee and torn apart by the King.

Meanwhile, Jonathan and Alex steal the Book from Anck-su-namun and use it to resurrect Evelyn. Rick discovers hieroglyphs explaining that Jonathan's scepter is the mystic Spear of Osiris, the only weapon capable of killing the King. Meanwhile, Evelyn fights with Anck-su-namun. Aided by Jonathan, Rick gets the spear and uses it to slay the King, sending him and the army of Anubis back into the Underworld.

As the oasis begins to implode and the pyramid crumbles, Rick and Imhotep cling to the ledge of a pit that leads to the underworld. Rick implores Evelyn to escape, but she risks her life to pull him to safety. Seeing this, Imhotep pleads for Anck-su-namun to do the same, but she abandons him. Heartbroken, Imhotep lets go and plummets into the underworld. While fleeing, Anck-su-namun inadvertently falls into a pit of scorpions and is eaten alive.

Izzy then arrives with the repaired dirigible and rescues the O'Connells just before the oasis and the pyramid are destroyed, though not before Jonathan swipes a diamond at its peak. They depart into the sunset, with Ardeth saluting them before riding away.

== Cast ==
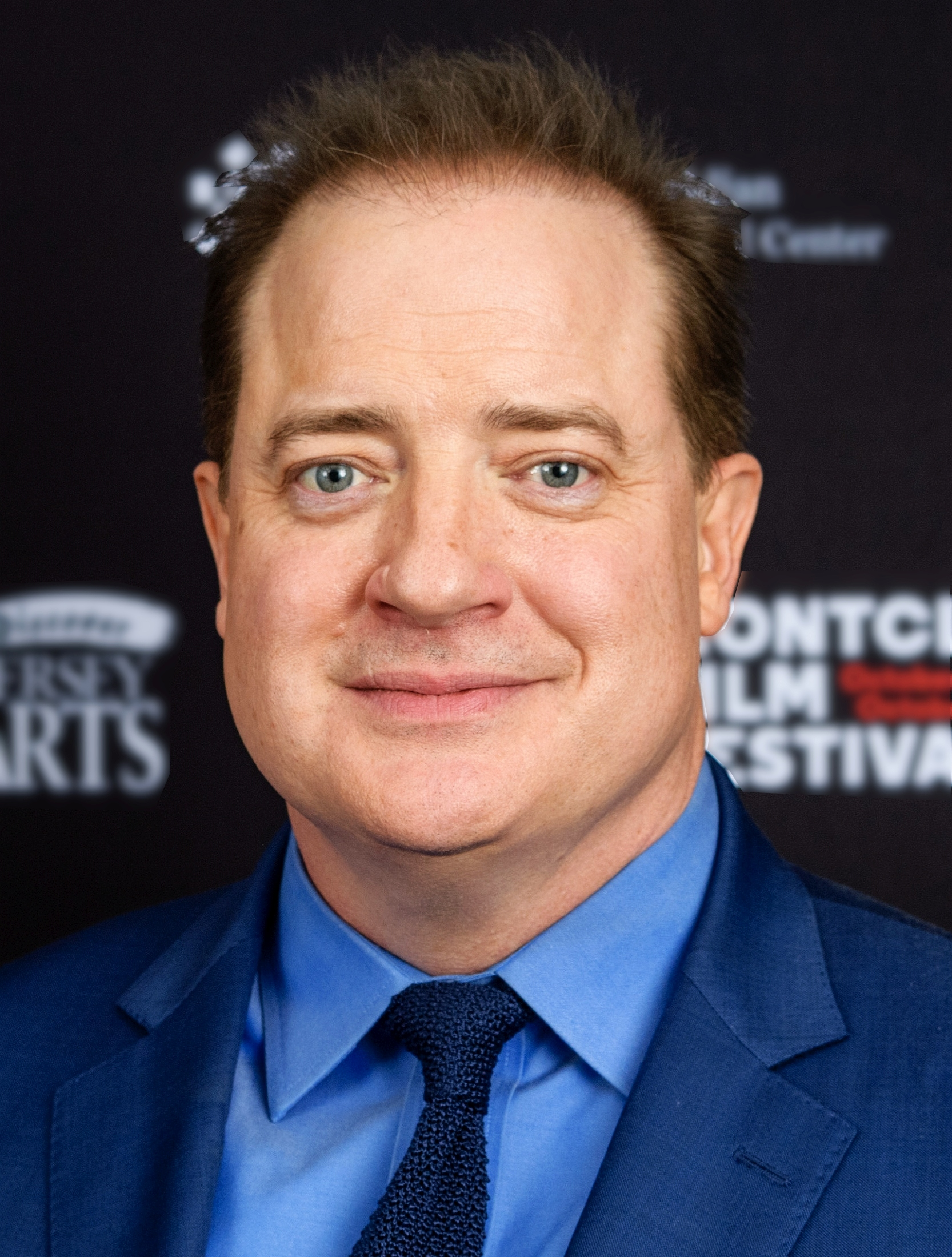
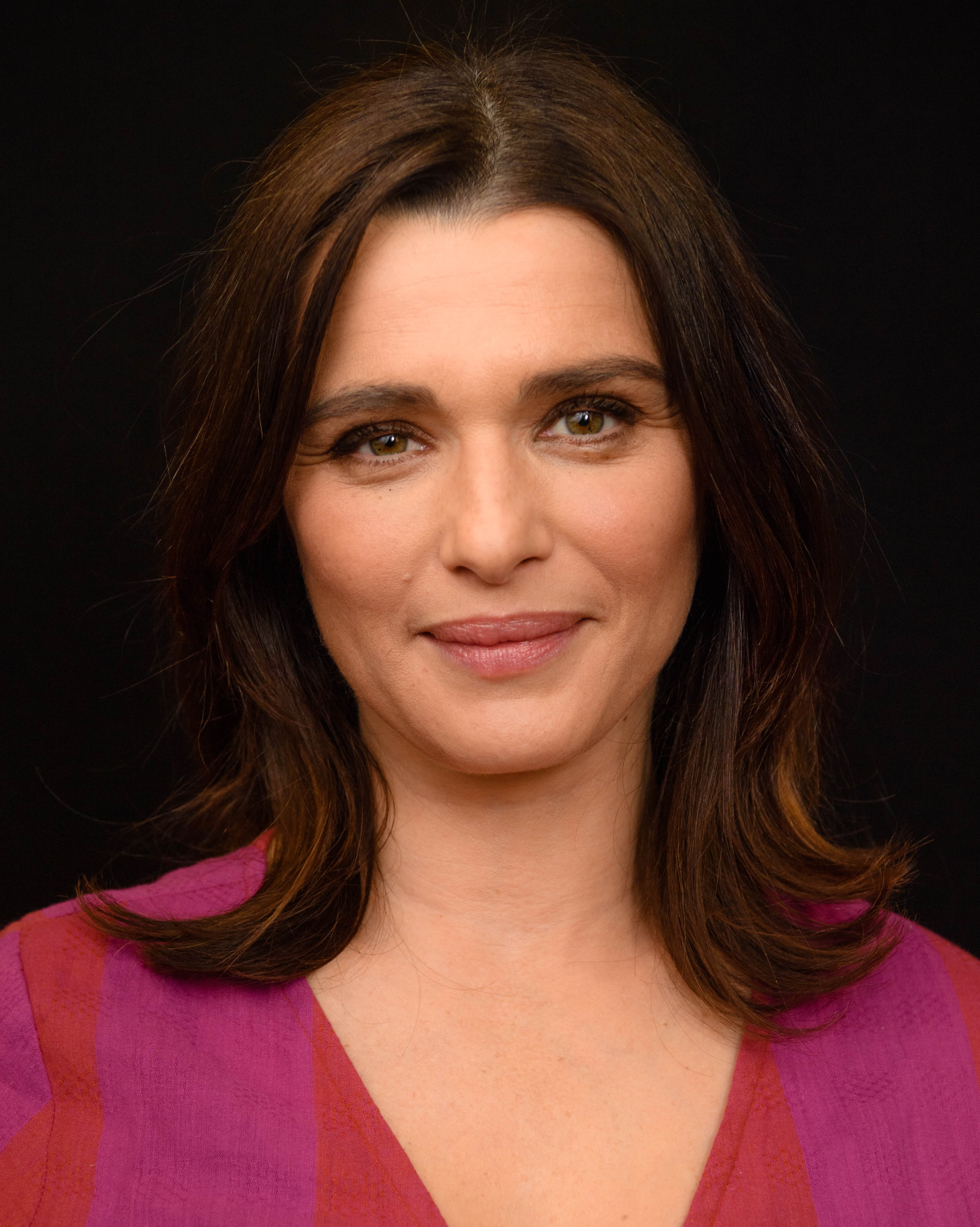
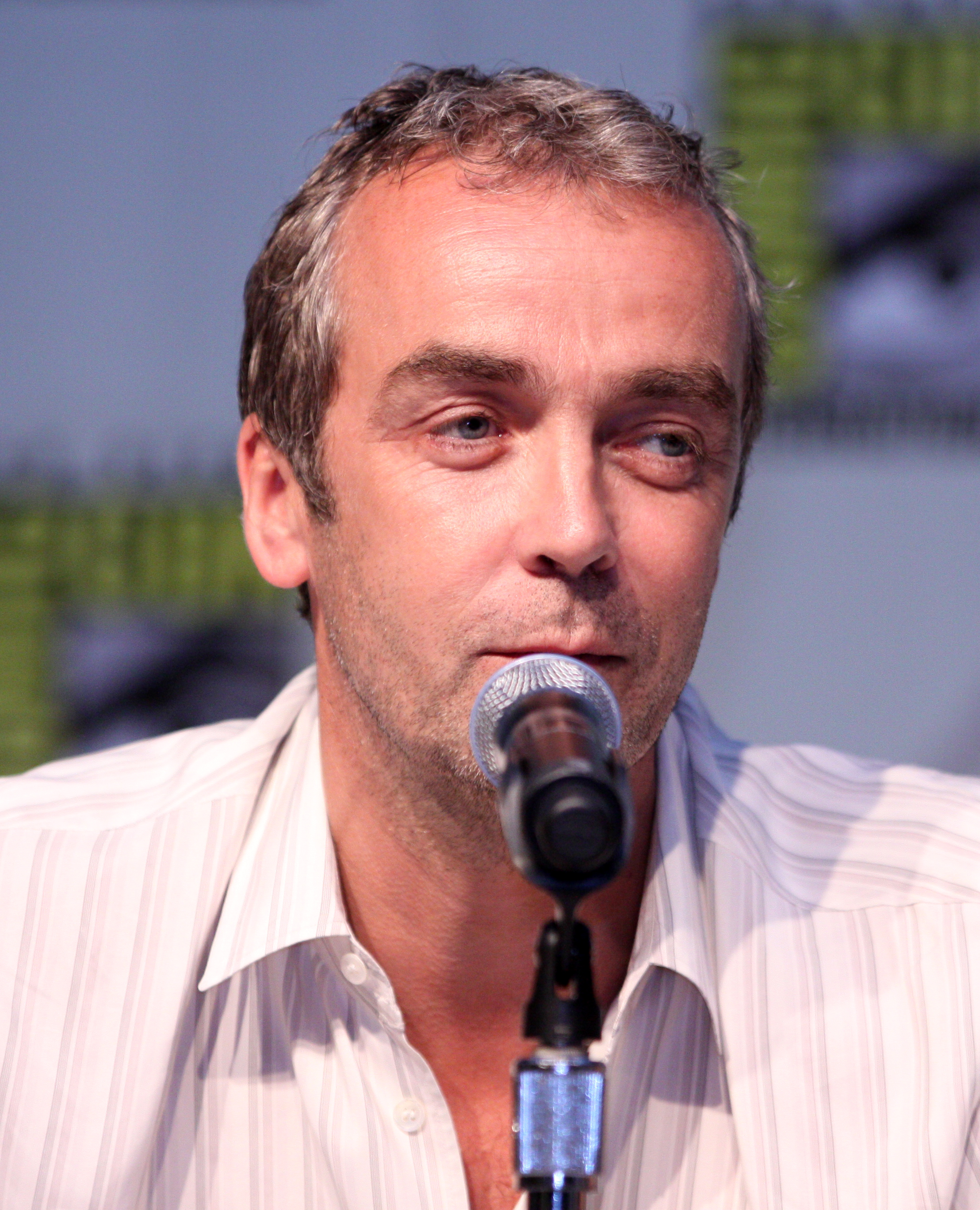
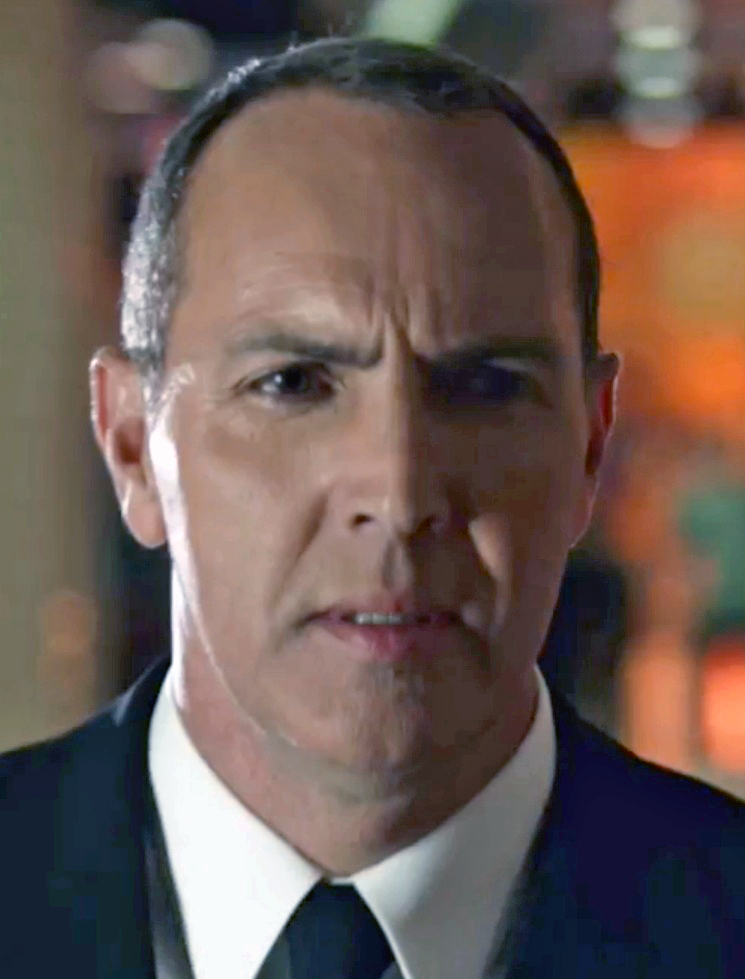
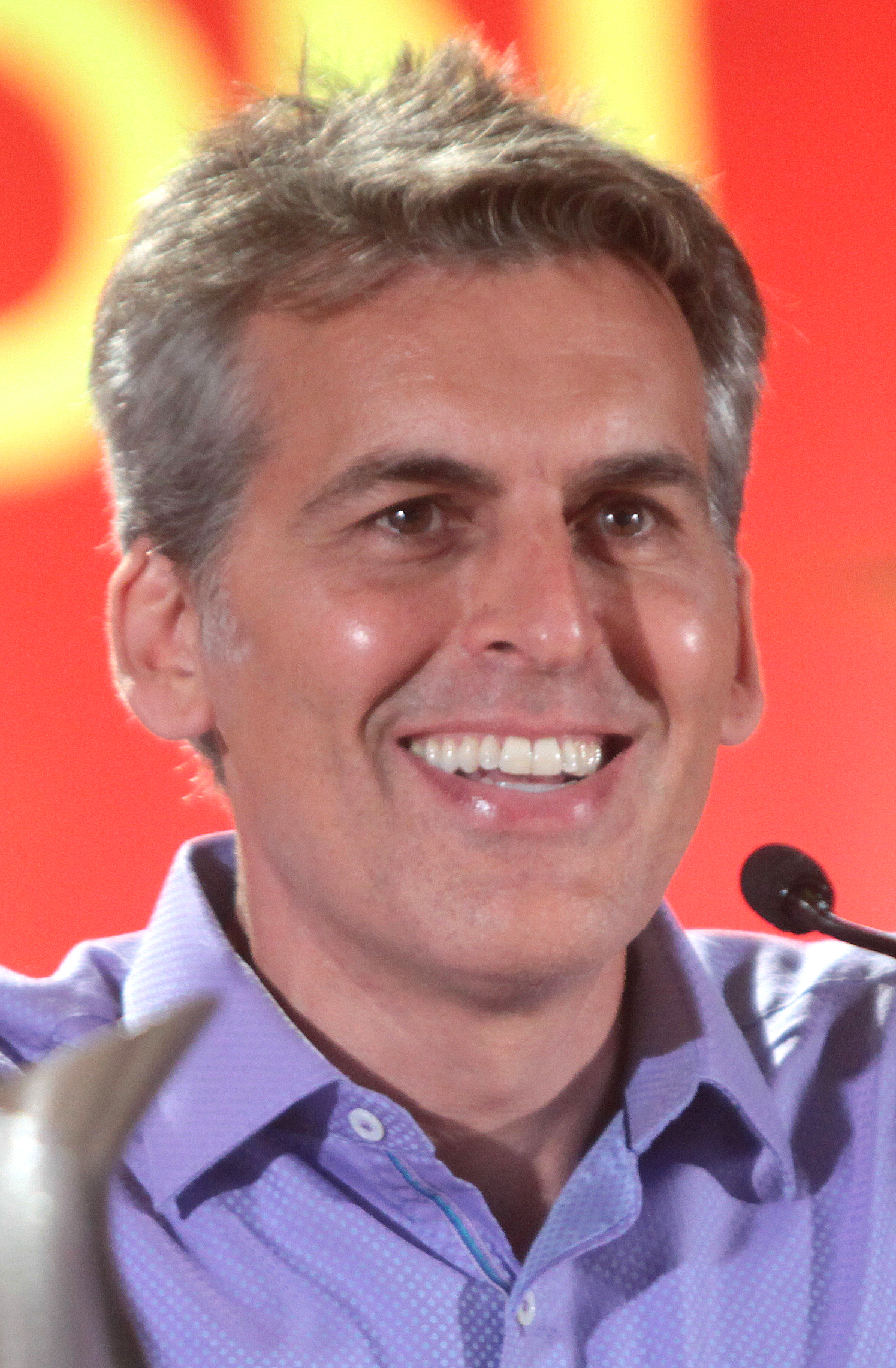
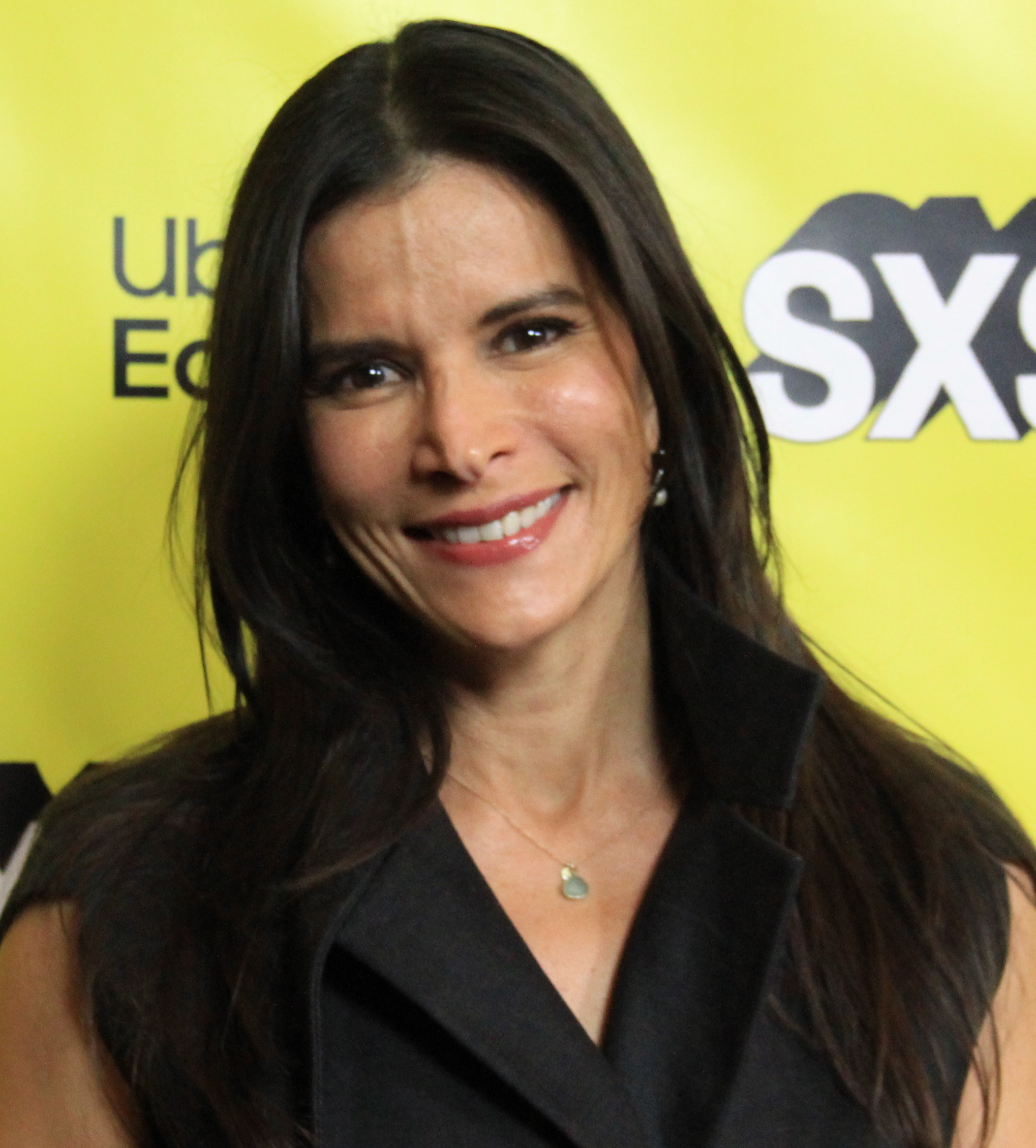
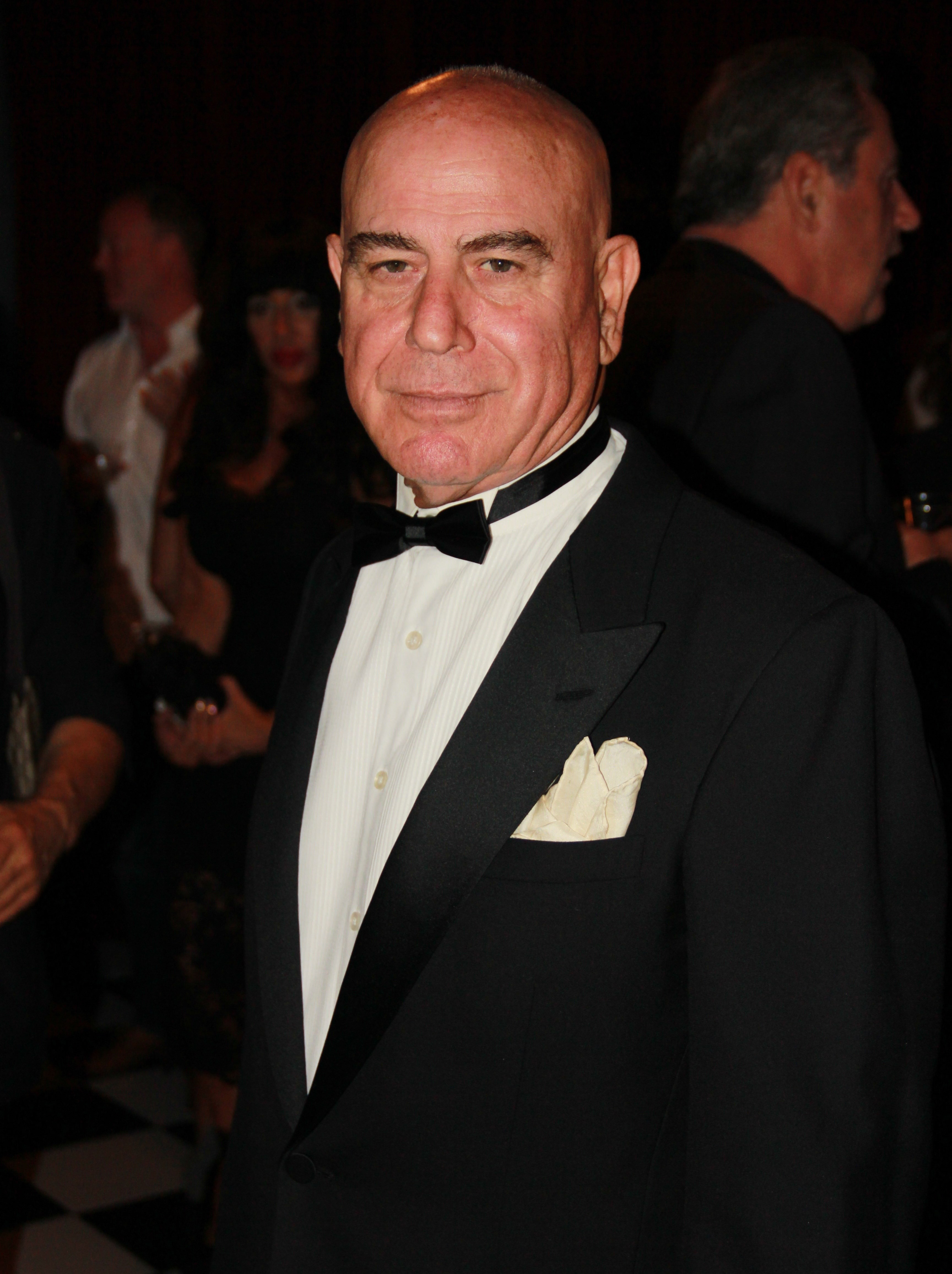
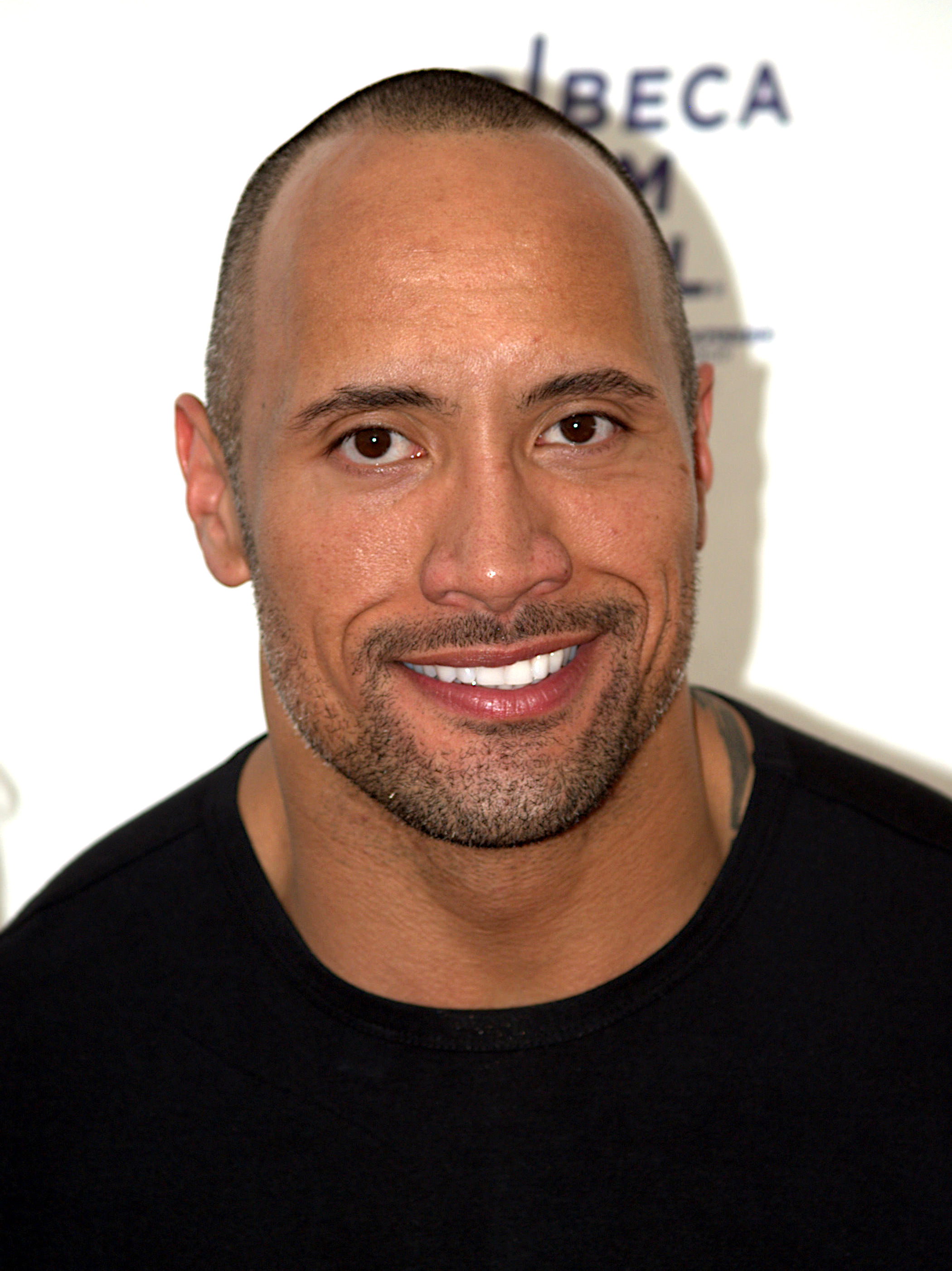
(L:R) Brendan Fraser, Rachel Weisz, John Hannah and Arnold Vosloo reprise their roles from The Mummy along with Oded Fehr, Patricia Velásquez and Aharon Ipalé, while Dwayne Johnson (a.k.a. The Rock) made his acting debut as the Scorpion King.
- Brendan Fraser as Rick O'Connell, a treasure hunter and former Legionnaire
- Rachel Weisz as Evelyn O'Connell / Nefertiri; respectively, Rick's wife, and the daughter of Pharaoh Seti I
- John Hannah as Jonathan Carnahan
- Arnold Vosloo as Imhotep, High Priest of Osiris and lover of Anck-Su-Namun
- Oded Fehr as Ardeth Bay, a Medjai chieftain and warrior
- Patricia Velásquez as Meela Nais / Anck-su-namun, the reincarnated form of Pharaoh Seti I's mistress, and secret lover of Imhotep
- Freddie Boath as Alex O'Connell, Rick and Evelyn's son
- Dwayne "The Rock" Johnson as Mathayus of Akkad / The Scorpion King, an ancient warrior who sold his soul to Anubis
- Alun Armstrong as Baltus Hafez, the cult leader
- Adewale Akinnuoye-Agbaje as Lock-Nah, a cult enforcer
- Shaun Parkes as Izzy Buttons, Rick's friend and a dirigible pilot
- Bruce Byron as Red Willits, a thief contracted by the cult to claim the Bracelet of Anubis
- Joe Dixon as Jacques Clemons, a thief contracted by the cult to claim the Bracelet of Anubis
- Tom Fisher as Jacob Spivey, a thief contracted by the cult to claim the Bracelet of Anubis
- Aharon Ipalé as Pharaoh Seti I, the Pharaoh of Egypt, whom Imhotep killed in 1290 BC

== Production ==
=== Development ===
Following the success of The Mummy (1999), Universal Pictures immediately moved forward with plans for a sequel. Writer-director Stephen Sommers was approached by Universal after the film's opening weekend, and within a day, he began developing ideas for The Mummy Returns. Sommers had already been contemplating a sequel during the production of the original film, aiming to expand the story with a larger scale, enhanced special effects, and fresh adventures for the familiar characters. He wanted to create a new adventure without repeating the same formula, aiming to "outdo" his previous work.

Sommers chose to set The Mummy Returns in 1933, seven years after the events of the first film. This allowed the characters to evolve, with Rick and Evelyn now married and living comfortably in London. They have a son, Alex, who embodies the best traits of both parents. The story intertwines multiple timelines, exploring the ancient past of the Scorpion King, Imhotep, and the O'Connells' present-day life. Sommers also sought to delve deeper into the fascination with ancient Egypt that was central to the original film.

=== Casting ===
Sommers was eager to reunite the original cast, including Brendan Fraser, Rachel Weisz, and John Hannah, for the sequel. The returning actors were enthusiastic about the script, which combined elements of horror, visual effects, comedy, and romance. Weisz and Patricia Velasquez trained extensively in ancient Japanese martial arts to portray more physically demanding roles. Freddie Boath accepted the role of the O'Connell's son Alex after choosing to audition for it instead of Harry Potter. New to the cast was Dwayne "The Rock" Johnson, who played the Scorpion King. Although Johnson was new to acting, Sommers felt his natural charisma was well-suited for the role of a fearsome warrior who made a pact with the god Anubis. Johnson embraced the physical demands of the role, which involved extensive makeup and hours of preparation.

=== Filming ===
Principal photography began in the deserts of Morocco, with additional second-unit work filmed in Jordan, including locations like the gorges at Petra. In Morocco, filming took place in Erfoud, which had also been used for The Mummy, and Ouarzazate. The production then moved to Shepperton Studios in England, where sets for ancient pyramids and temples were constructed. Filming also took place in various locations around London, including the British Museum and Tower Bridge. Despite challenges posed by the weather, the crew adapted quickly.

=== Visual effects ===
The visual effects team, led by John Berton at Industrial Light & Magic (ILM), aimed to surpass the effects of the first film. Advances in computer-generated imagery (CGI) allowed for more intricate and realistic creatures, such as Imhotep. The filmmakers focused on creating a seamless integration between the live-action sequences and CGI, using detailed camera tracking and motion-capture technology.

Berton highlighted the challenge of animating creatures with organic realism and developing characters like Imhotep, whose interactions with other characters were more detailed than in the original film. Arnold Vosloo, who reprised his role as Imhotep, faced the challenge of acting alongside these digital elements, often reacting to creatures and environments that were only added in post-production.

Despite advancements in CGI, the Scorpion King's appearance was widely criticized for its awkward facial features and uncanny valley effect. The visual effects team faced challenges due to limited reference material of Dwayne Johnson, as his WWE commitments prevented detailed facial scans. As a result, the digital representation of Johnson lacked accuracy, standing out as one of the film's most criticized visual effects, despite improvements in other characters like Imhotep.

== Music ==
The Mummy Returns: Original Motion Picture Soundtrack

Soundtrack album by Alan Silvestri
- Released: May 1, 2001
- Length: 1:13:26
- Label: Decca Records

Professional ratings
Review scores
Source	Rating
AllMusic	3/5 stars
Empire	3/5 stars
Filmtracks	4/5 stars
Tracksounds	8/10 stars

The Mummy Returns: Original Motion Picture Soundtrack was released on May 1, 2001, by Decca Records.

The score was composed and conducted by Alan Silvestri, who did not reuse any of Jerry Goldsmith's themes from the first film. It was performed by the Sinfonia of London and orchestrated by William Ross.

The soundtrack contains Silvestri's as well as a version of the song "Forever May Not Be Long Enough" by the rock band Live, which slightly differs from the song's album version.

A 2-CD expansion was released by Intrada Records in 2018.

== Release ==
=== Marketing ===
The teaser trailer was released in November 2000. It was initially attached to the screenings of How the Grinch Stole Christmas, but was pulled due to complaints from parents about its intense and frightening nature towards younger children. However, the trailer was shown in front of other holiday movies such as Charlie's Angels, The 6th Day, Unbreakable and Vertical Limit. It was also included on the home video releases of Meet the Parents. A new trailer premiered in March 2001.

=== Theatrical ===
The Mummy Returns was released theatrically in North America on May 4, 2001. Playing in 3,401 theaters upon its opening, it had the fourth-widest release of any film, after Mission: Impossible 2, Scream 3 and The Perfect Storm.

=== Home media ===
The Mummy Returns debuted on VHS and DVD on October 2, 2001. It became the fastest-selling DVD ever in the United States, selling 2 million copies after its first week of release, while also surpassing Gladiator. The film would briefly hold this record for two weeks until it was taken by Star Wars: Episode I – The Phantom Menace, which sold 2.2 million copies during its first week. There are two separate versions of this DVD release either in widescreen or fullscreen formats.

The film was subsequently released on the high-definition Blu-ray format on July 22, 2008, and on UHD Blu-ray in 2017.

== Reception ==
=== Box office ===
The Mummy Returns earned $23.4 million on its first day of release, then made $26.8 million the day after. This made it the highest Friday and Saturday grosses, surpassing both Toy Story 2 and The Lost World: Jurassic Park respectively. Later that year, those records were simultaneously given to Planet of the Apes and Harry Potter and the Sorcerer's Stone. During its opening weekend, the film made $68.1 million, making it the second-highest opening weekend of all time, only behind The Lost World: Jurassic Park. Moreover, it surpassed Hannibal to have the highest opening weekend for a 2001 film, joining Monsters, Inc., Rush Hour 2 and Planet of the Apes to become one of the only four films of that year to make $60 million in their first three days of release. The film also became one of four consecutive Universal films of the year to cross the $40 million in an opening weekend, with the others being American Pie 2, The Fast and the Furious and Jurassic Park III. Upon opening, the film reached the top of the box office, beating out Driven. For its second weekend, it collected a total of $33.7 million, outgrossing A Knight's Tale in the process. The Mummy Returns would remain in the number one spot at the box office for a total of two weeks until Shrek took it.

The film grossed $203 million in the United States and Canada box offices and $241 million internationally, grossing over $444 million worldwide, making it the seventh-highest-grossing film of 2001.

The film would be re-released for its 25th anniversary on March 27, 2026. During the first three days of the 25th anniversary re-release, The Mummy Returns would gross $596,080 at 1,430 theaters.

=== Critical response ===
The Mummy Returns received mixed reviews from critics. On Rotten Tomatoes, it holds a 46% rating based on 142 reviews, with an average rating of 5.5/10. The site's consensus states: "In The Mummy Returns, the special effects are impressive, but the characters seem secondary to the computer-generated imagery." On Metacritic, it has an average rating of 48 out of 100 based on 31 reviews, indicating "mixed or average reviews". Audiences polled by CinemaScore gave the film an average grade of "A−" on an A+ to F scale.

Roger Ebert, who awarded the first film three stars, gave the second film only two, saying that "The mistake of The Mummy Returns is to abandon the characters, and to use the plot only as a clothesline for special effects and action sequences." James Berardinelli of ReelViews gave the film two and a half stars (out of four), calling it "hollow, lightweight entertainment—not unpleasant, but far from the summer's definitive action/adventure flick."

Kenneth Turan of the Los Angeles Times gave the film a positive review, praising its "constant plot turns, cheeky sensibility and omnipresent action sequences." Todd McCarthy of Variety praised "the nonstop action of the final hour", saying that it "bursts with visual goodies." Rene Rodriguez of The Miami Herald said, "Twelve-year-olds weaned on Nintendo may not mind, but anyone who remembers the tactile thrill of an alarmingly real boulder rolling down on Indiana Jones in Raiders of the Lost Ark will be left cold."

Joe Morgenstern of The Wall Street Journal gave the film a negative review, saying that it "has all of the clank but none of the swank of the previous version." Charles Taylor of Salon.com was also not impressed, calling The Mummy Returns "everything the first Mummy was fun for not being."

=== Accolades ===
Award	Subject	Nominee	Result	Ref.
Saturn Awards	Best Fantasy Film		Nominated	
Saturn Awards	Best Makeup	Aileen Seaton, Nick Dudman and Jane Walker	Nominated	
Saturn Awards	Best Special Effects	John Andrew Berton Jr., Daniel Jeannette, Neil Corbould and Thomas Rosseter	Nominated	
Saturn Awards	Best Young Actor	Freddie Boath	Nominated	
Young Artist Awards	Best Young Actor	Freddie Boath	Nominated	
Kids' Choice Awards	Favorite Movie Actor	Brendan Fraser	Nominated	
Teen Choice Awards	Choice Action Movie Actor	Brendan Fraser	Nominated	
Teen Choice Awards	Choice Movie Villain	The Rock	Won	
Teen Choice Awards	Choice Action Movie		Nominated	
Golden Trailer Awards	Best Title Sequence		Nominated	
Golden Reel Awards	Best Sound Editing - Effects & Foley	Leslie Shatz, Malcolm Fife, Ann Scibelli, Jon Olive and Jonathan Klein	Nominated	
Empire Awards	Best British Actress	Rachel Weisz	Nominated	
Stinkers Bad Movie Awards	Worst Supporting Actor	The Rock	Won	

== Video games ==
Two video games based on the movie were released. The first was released on the Game Boy Color, developed by GameBrains, and was released within the film's theatrical release. The other is for the PlayStation 2, developed by Blitz Games and was released in October 2001, to coincide with the film's home media release. Both titles were published by Universal Interactive. Both versions of the game were poorly received.

== Franchise ==
=== Spin-off ===
A spin-off/prequel film centering on Dwayne Johnson's character, the Scorpion King, was released on April 19, 2002. It focuses on the King's origins, as he rises to power before the events of The Mummy Returns' prologue. The film received mixed reviews but was only a moderate commercial success. It spawned The Scorpion King film series, with direct-to-video sequels and with different actors playing the title role.

=== Sequels ===
An indirect sequel to The Mummy Returns was released on August 1, 2008. Brendan Fraser and John Hannah both reprised their roles, while Rachel Weisz was replaced by Maria Bello as Evelyn, and Luke Ford played the now-adult Alex O'Connell. The film received generally negative reviews, and was the lowest-grossing film of the trilogy.

A new film featuring Fraser and Weisz reprising their roles is in development and is scheduled to be released on October 15, 2027. It was originally scheduled for a May 19, 2028 release.
