= List of The Mummy franchise characters =

The following is a selected list of characters who have appeared throughout The Mummy film series and its spin-off series The Scorpion King. Main and minor characters are included.

== Main characters ==
=== Richard "Rick" O'Connell ===
Richard "Rick" O'Connell (portrayed by Brendan Fraser) is, along with Evelyn, a main character in The Mummy films. He is an American adventurer, treasure hunter, highly decorated veteran of WW1 (Knight of Legion of Honor, Médaille Militaire, and Croix de Guerre) a former Captain of the French Foreign Legion.

=== Evelyn Carnahan ===
Evelyn "Evy" Carnahan (portrayed by Rachel Weisz in The Mummy, The Mummy Returns, and The Mummy: Book of the Dead, Maria Bello in The Mummy: Tomb of the Dragon Emperor) is a British librarian and Egyptologist in the Cairo Museum of Antiquities. She, along with Rick, is a main character of the series. Evelyn, Rick and her brother Jonathan, travel to the lost city of Hamunaptra, where she hopes to find a rare, ancient book, the book of Amun-Ra. When an American expedition finds the Book of the Dead, which was purported to give eternal life, Evy steals the book from their sleeping Egyptologist and reads from a page of it. This unintentionally resurrects the titular mummy, Imhotep, who wants to use her body as a vessel to resurrect his long-dead lover, Anck-su-namun, taking her captive. Upon being rescued, she reads a page from the book of Amun-Ra, rendering Imhotep mortal and allowing Rick to kill him.

In The Mummy, the character was originally meant to be Lady Evelyn Herbert, the daughter of Lord Carnarvon, both present at the opening of Tutankhamun's tomb in November 1922. She and her brother were to be the children of the "cursed" Lord Carnarvon. The only evidence of this left in the film is in the line where Evelyn tells O'Connell that her father was an explorer.

In The Mummy Returns, it is revealed that Evelyn is the reincarnation of the Egyptian princess Nefertiri, the daughter of the Pharaoh whom Imhotep and Anck-su-namun killed.

The Mummy and characters from the franchise were featured in the video game, Funko Fusion, which was released in 2024. The game also includes Evelyn Carnahan.

=== Alex O'Connell ===
Alexander "Alex" O'Connell (portrayed by Freddie Boath in The Mummy Returns, Luke Ford in The Mummy: Tomb of the Dragon Emperor) is the son of Evy and Rick O'Connell. Alex protects his parents from two potential attackers in a temple, before inadvertently causing its destruction. It is here that his parents discover the Bracelet of Anubis, which shows Alex the path to the pyramid of the Scorpion King. He is captured by Imhotep's followers, and much of the film focuses on the attempts of his parents to rescue him. He has a witty and bratty attitude, but is good-hearted and intelligent far beyond his years, a trait his parents never hesitate to acknowledge.

In the third film, Alex is now a young adult. He travels to China on a dig searching for a lost tomb; when his parents arrive unexpectedly in Shanghai, he is forced to explain what he has been doing. During a preview to the exhibition of the Dragon Emperor, the mummy is resurrected and flees the museum. The O'Connells pursue the mummy with the help of Lin and her mother Zi Yuan. In the end, Alex teams up with his father to kill the Dragon Emperor, falling in love with Lin along the way.

=== Jonathan Carnahan ===
Jonathan Carnahan (portrayed by John Hannah) is Evelyn's older brother and a thief of considerable skill with some knowledge in reading Egyptian. He is less adept at fighting, navigating and negotiating than Rick, therefore is often left behind. He has some skills in marksmanship, often holding his own against mummies.

In the second film, Jonathan has lost his share of the family's new wealth apart from a golden sceptre, which he continues carrying around even after Imhotep is resurrected and they learn about the new threat of the Scorpion King. After his nephew, Alex is captured by the cult of Imhotep to use the Bracelet of Anubis to find the oasis and temple of the Scorpion King. Later, after Evelyn is killed by the reincarnated Anck-su-namun, Jonathan faces her in single combat while Alex uses the Book of the Dead to resurrect his mother. The family escapes the collapsing temple, with Jonathan taking a large diamond from the top of the temple for himself.

By the third film, Jonathan has opened a nightclub in Shanghai named after Imhotep, but becomes caught up in the struggle against the now-reborn Dragon Emperor of China. After the Emperor's forces are defeated by an army of his undead enemies, Jonathan claims the powerful diamond the Eye of Shangri-La and leaves for Peru to open a new nightclub, albeit with the implication that mummies are soon to be discovered there.

=== Ardeth Bay ===
Ardeth Bay (portrayed by Oded Fehr) is the chief of the Medjai, the descendants of the Pharaoh's bodyguards. They are sworn to do all in their power to prevent the resurrection of Imhotep. To this end, for over three thousand years, the Medjai has silently guarded the city, either killing or scaring off all who come across it. Despite opposing the archaeologists as they begin digging, Ardeth Bay becomes an ally when it becomes apparent that they all must work together to stop Imhotep.

In the second film, Bay goes through many trials to stop the release of the Scorpion King, but does not succeed and the Scorpion King is released. He leads his people in a desperate battle against the Anubis Warriors that form the Scorpion King's army. He also has a pet falcon named Horus, which he uses to send messages to the other Medjai tribes.

This character is named after Ardath Bay, Imhotep's alias in the 1932 film.

=== Imhotep ===
Imhotep (portrayed by Arnold Vosloo) is the title character of The Mummy and The Mummy Returns. In 1290 BC, Imhotep was the High Priest of Osiris under Pharaoh Seti I. When Seti discovered Imhotep's affair with Seti's mistress, Anck-su-namun, Imhotep and Anck-su-namun killed Seti, with Anck-su-namun committing suicide before the guards could capture her. Imhotep had the power to resurrect Anck-su-namun, but was captured at Hamunaptra before he could do so. For his crimes, Imhotep was sentenced to endure the Hom Dai curse, where he was mummified and buried alive alongside slow-eating carnivorous scarabs. As a result of the curse, Imhotep became an undead fiend with control over sand and the power to invoke the ten plagues of Egypt.

During an archaeological dig, Imhotep is accidentally revived and regenerates his body by systematically hunting and consuming the flesh and organs of those responsible for opening the box containing his canopic jars. He nearly succeeds in resurrecting Anck-su-namun using Evelyn as a sacrifice, but is ultimately defeated when his immortality is taken by the powers of the Book of Amun-Ra. Imhotep is stabbed and falls into the black pool from which he summoned Anck-su-namun's soul.

In the second film, Imhotep is resurrected and seeks out the Bracelet of Anubis, key to finding the lair of the Scorpion King, an ancient warrior whose power Imhotep needs as he is still mortal. After finding the bracelet on the arm of Alex O'Connell, Imhotep captures the boy and uses him to find the Scorpion King.

Once Imhotep reaches the lair, he is rendered mortal and the powers granted by the curse of Hom Dai are greatly diminished. When the Scorpion King responds to Imhotep's summons, Imhotep tricks him into attacking Rick O'Connell. When Rick kills the Scorpion King and sends him and his army to the Underworld, the palace begins to collapse. Rick and Imhotep both nearly fall into a chasm that leads to the underworld, and grab onto the ledge. While Rick is rescued by Evelyn, Anck-su-namun leaves Imhotep to die to save her own life. Her betrayal causes Imhotep to lose the will to live, leading him to cast himself into the pit.

=== Anck-su-namun ===
Anck-su-namun (portrayed by Patricia Velásquez) is the secret lover of Imhotep and the mistress, future bride, and bodyguard of Pharaoh Seti I. Anck-su-namun had a deep rivalry with Princess Nefertiri. She kills the pharaoh and then herself at the beginning of The Mummy after her affair with Imhotep is exposed, and then waits for Imhotep to resurrect her so they can continue their relationship. Anck-su-namun appears briefly in The Mummy, as she is undead like Imhotep, and she tries to kill Evelyn to fully resurrect herself. Jonathan, however, takes command of the mummies of Seti's bodyguards and has them kill Anck-su-namun.

In the second film, Anck-su-namun is reincarnated as Meela Nais, who unearths Imhotep along with the Books of the Dead and Amun-Ra. After freeing Imhotep, she allows him to have her past life's soul enter her body to completely become Anck-su-namun, regaining her memories and combat skills. Knowing that Evelyn is the reincarnation of Nefertiri, Anck-su-namun succeeds in killing her, but she is resurrected by Alex while Jonathan distracts Anck-su-namun. After Evelyn's resurrection, she battles Anck-su-namun, forcing her to run away. When the Golden Pyramid begins to collapse and fade, Anck-su-namun leaves Imhotep to fend for himself, only to fall into a pit of scorpions.

=== Mathayus (Scorpion King) ===
Mathayus the Scorpion King (portrayed by Dwayne Johnson) appears in The Scorpion King film series as well as The Mummy Returns. In The Scorpion King: Book of Souls, he is stated to be a demigod rather than a regular man.

Born in the kingdom of Akkad, Mathayus set out to join the Black Scorpions warrior group. When he returned from his training, he found that his father's murderer, Sargon, had usurped the throne. Mathayus set out on a personal quest of vengeance to kill Sargon. After accomplishing the task, Mathayus was offered the position of king, but turned it down to become an adventurer.

Mathayus was then hired to kill Memnon, who ruled a part of Egypt with Cassandra. Memnon killed Mathayus' brother and the other Akkadian Rama, making Mathayus the last Akkadian. Once again, Mathayus embarked on a quest of vengeance, but would be aided by the likes of many in a quest to usurp Memnon. After killing Memnon, Mathayus married Cassandra and was crowned the king of Memnon's empire.

This kingdom too would fall following Cassandra's death, but through repeated work as a mercenary (as depicted in the third, fourth and fifth films), Mathayus again managed to become king years later and set out on a bloodthirsty quest to conquer the world. After conquering most of Egypt, Mathayus' advance was stopped at the city of Thebes. He was forced to make a deal with Anubis, where he would give Anubis his soul if Anubis helped him defeat his enemies. Anubis fulfilled his part of the deal and helped Mathayus destroy Thebes, providing him with command of his army of Anubis Warriors, jackal-headed warriors who can only be killed by beheading. Anubis transformed Mathayus into a scorpion-like monster and forced him into his servitude.

After being summoned by Imhotep, who wished to rob Mathayus of Anubis' army, Mathayus is tricked and engaged into battle with Rick. Rick uses the Spear of Osiris to kill Mathayus, then commands Mathayus and the Anubis Warriors to return to the underworld.

== The Mummy ==
=== Gad Hassan ===
Gad Hassan (portrayed by Omid Djalili) was the warden of Cairo Prison, where Rick O'Connell was to be hanged. He was bribed by Evy and Jonathan to release O'Connell with 25% of the profits from the Hamunaptra expedition. He comes along on the expedition with the intent to protect his investment. As soon as the expedition reaches the City of the Dead, Hassan's greed takes over and he wanders alone searching for valuables to take. Hassan comes across a jewel containing a scarab beetle that burrows into his brain. Hassan sprints off and runs into a solid rock wall, dying instantly.

=== Beni Gabor ===
Beni Gabor (portrayed by Kevin J. O'Connor) is a thief who enlisted in the French Foreign Legion and was part of the same unit as Rick O'Connell, which crossed Libya and Egypt to find Hamunaptra. During an overwhelming attack by an army of Tuareg nomads, he fled into the City and closed the entrance, making him the only one besides Rick to have survived the attack.

Three years later, he leads a group of American grave robbers to Hamunaptra, also encountering Rick again on his own expedition. While there he becomes separated from Rick during the panic of the Locust Plague and encounters Imhotep, who nearly kills Gabor before he can communicate in Hebrew, the language of the slaves in ancient Egypt. Imhotep recruits Gabor to act as his henchman with the promise of gold. Once Imhotep is fully regenerated and acquires everything he needs, he releases Gabor from his service and allows him to take whatever he wishes from the treasure room as payment. After Imhotep is sent back to the underworld, Gabor accidentally sets off a booby trap and is killed by flesh-eating scarabs.

=== Terence Bey ===
Dr. Terence Bey (portrayed by Erick Avari) is an Egyptologist, the curator of the Cairo Museum of Antiquities and a member of a secret society sworn to prevent Imhotep from being resurrected. He is first seen as a supervisor to Evelyn during her time as a librarian. He is the beneficiary of Evelyn's parents' donation to the library that he is overseeing. Later, Evelyn, Rick and Jonathan found he was working with Ardeth to prevent the resurrection of Imhotep. He escapes from the Cairo Museum with Rick's crew. When Rick's crew is cornered by Imhotep, Bey sacrifices himself so that Rick, Ardeth and Jonathan can escape.

=== Winston Havelock ===
An aging, nostalgic British fighter pilot, Captain Winston Havelock (portrayed by Bernard Fox) fought in World War I in the Royal Flying Corps, and stayed on into peacetime with the Royal Air Force. He is the sole British flyer of No. 9 Auxiliary Squadron at his isolated RAF station in Giza, all his fellows having either died or moved on to better postings.

Winston is first seen in The Mummy during the time of Mr. Burns's death lamenting the boredom of post-war life, forgotten by the RAF and missing his friends who died in the Great War. Yearning for one more chance to act bravely in the face of danger, Havelock eagerly agrees to fly Rick and his crew to Hamunaptra in his Great War-vintage biplane. During the flight, Winston is killed when Imhotep summons a sandstorm that brings the plane down.

=== Allen Chamberlain ===
Dr. Allen Chamberlain (portrayed by Jonathan Hyde) is an Australian-British Egyptologist who led the expedition that uncovered Imhotep's body. Chamberlain knew of the booby-traps and lore that surrounded the City of the Dead and was reluctant to open the chest containing the Book of the Dead, he did so anyway and was thus subject to the curse that entailed. While trying to flee the city with the Book of the Dead, Chamberlain is killed by Imhotep.

=== Bernard Burns ===
Bernard Burns (portrayed by Tuc Watkins) is a treasure hunter who participated in the expedition that uncovered Imhotep's body. He was robbed of his eyes and tongue by Imhotep, but was rescued by the Medjai before Imhotep could do any more harm. The now-handicapped Burns returns to Cairo, where he is killed by Imhotep.

=== Isaac Henderson ===
Isaac Henderson (portrayed by Stephen Dunham) is a treasure hunter who participated in the expedition that uncovered Imhotep's body. After Imhotep is freed, Henderson escapes to Cairo, but is attacked and killed by Imhotep.

=== David Daniels ===
David Daniels (portrayed by Corey Johnson) is a treasure hunter who participated in the expedition that uncovered Imhotep's body. After Imhotep is freed, Henderson escapes to Cairo, where he attempts to persuade Imhotep to spare him by giving him the jar he had stolen. Imhotep, furious, kills Daniels by draining his body fluids.

== The Mummy Returns ==
=== Baltus Hafez ===
Baltus Hafez (portrayed by Alun Armstrong) is a curator in the British Museum in charge of ancient Egyptian artifacts and antiquities. He was corrupted by the lure of power that was said to be obtained from defeating the Scorpion King, and for that he was the leader of a cult dedicated to defeating the Scorpion King by calling forth the High Priest Imhotep from death and assisting him in his wicked ways. After Alex unknowingly dons the Scorpion King's bracelet, Hafez abducts him and took him alongside the cult to the oasis where the Scorpion King lay dormant, also taking the opportunity to snatch the bracelet after Rick narrowly got Alex unto shade to remove it. Hafez loses his hand in the ritual that resurrects the Scorpion King and is killed by the Scorpion King shortly afterward.

=== Lock-Nah ===
Lock-Nah (portrayed by Adewale Akinnuoye-Agbaje) is the bodyguard of Meela Nais and chief enforcer of the Cult of Imhotep led by Baltus Hafez, who would work with the cult to obtain power. Loch-Nah is later killed by Ardeth Bay.

=== Meela Nais ===
Meela Nais (portrayed by Patricia Velasquez) is the reincarnation of Anck-Su-Namun, a concubine of the Pharaoh Seti I, that joined a cult whose intent was to see that the High Priest of Osiris Imhotep be resurrected and conquer the Earth. She willingly allows her ancestor's spirit to inhabit her body to reunite with Imhotep.

=== Izzy Buttons ===
Izzy Buttons (portrayed by Shaun Parkes) is Rick O'Connell's oldest and closest friend and a part-time pilot. The two work together on a tugboat operation in the Atlantic following their time spent in the trenches of World War I. Buttons is often brash and quick to anger, but Rick's particular brand of sarcasm and anger are known to steady him. Buttons also has a spotty history with Jonathan, who defrauded him out of an investment in leather manufacturing. The O'Connells place unyielding trust in Buttons after his homemade hot-air balloon allows them to outrun Imhotep.

=== Red Willits ===
Red Willits (portrayed by Bruce Byron) is the leader of the three thieves working for Baltus Hafez. Red, alongside Jacob Spivey (portrayed by Tom Fisher) and Jacques Clemons (portrayed by Joe Dixon) are ordered to steal the Bracelet of Anubis when they are interrupted by a tidal wave Evy inadvertently caused. After they fail to obtain the chest, Red and his gang are ordered to obtain a chest from an unknown mausoleum, which turns out to be the same chest that resulted in the deaths of the expedition team from the first film. After a disagreement with the payment, Meela locks the three thieves into a train car and tricks them into opening the chest, after which they are all killed by Imhotep.

== The Scorpion King ==
=== Cassandra ===
Cassandra (portrayed by Kelly Hu) is a sorceress with precognitive abilities. Mathayus was hired to capture her, but the two of them quickly fell in love. As they went back to Memnon's throne, she distracted Memnon so Mathayus could become king. Mathayus' reign, however, did not last long after her death from a plague.

== The Mummy: Tomb of the Dragon Emperor ==
=== Han (Dragon Emperor) ===
Han (portrayed by Jet Li), also known as the Dragon Emperor, was a ruthless warlord who desired immortality. To do so, he sought the sorceress Zi Yuan for the secrets of immortality. He orders his first in command, Ming Guo, to never touch Yuan, for he wishes her to be his queen. Yuan, however, has fallen in love with Guo and, after making the Emperor immortal, wishes to live with him; in response, the Emperor has Guo killed. It is shortly revealed that the Emperor was cursed once he was made immortal and turns into stone, as does his army. His body is excavated by Alex O'Connell and placed in a museum, where he is revived through the intervention of General Yang. Once revived, he manages to find Shangri-La where he completes his immortality and gains shapeshifting powers. He then kidnaps Lin, the daughter of Yuan, and goes to the site where he was excavated, where he revives his Terracotta Army and kills Yuan in close combat. Han is killed when stabbed through the heart by Rick and Alex O'Connell with a dagger cursed for the purpose of killing him.

The character is loosely based on Qin Shi Huang, the first Emperor of China from the Qin dynasty.

=== Zi Yuan ===
Zi Yuan (portrayed by Michelle Yeoh) is a sorceress whom the Emperor sought out to receive the eternal life. She encountered Ming Guo, his general, who was sent to find her, and they fell in love. The Emperor forbade Guo from touching Yuan, but they defiantly embraced and she become pregnant with Guo's daughter, Lin. After granting the Emperor his immortality, she wished to be with Guo, but the Emperor instead had him killed. He then stabbed Yuan, but not before she revealed that she had in fact laid a curse upon him that turned him and his army into stone. She managed to escape into the mountains where she was recovered by a yeti and taken to Shangri-La, where she became immortal and gave birth to her daughter. For the next 2,000 years they guarded the secrets of the Emperor until he was revived. The Emperor enters Shangri-La and lifts his curse, becoming fully immortal and gaining greater powers, and kidnaps Lin, taking her to where his body was found. Yuan follows him with the O'Connells and sacrifices Lin's and her own immortality to raise an army of the Emperor's undead enemies to combat his newly raised Terracotta Army. She battles the Emperor in close combat where she is mortally wounded, but is able to provide Lin and the O'Connells a special dagger they use to vanquish the Emperor.

=== Lin ===
Lin (portrayed by Isabella Leong) is Zi Yuan's daughter and protector of the Dragon Emperor's tomb. Born after the death of her father 2,000 years ago, Ming Guo, at the hands of the Emperor, Lin was raised in Shangri-La and kept young and immortal with the water there. She tries to stop Alex O'Connell from unearthing the Emperor's body, but she is stopped by Alex's partner Professor Roger Wilson, who is actually working to resurrect him.

She and Alex meet again in Shanghai where the Emperor is put on display, and she reveals Wilson's treachery and tries to stab the Emperor's corpse in the heart with the only dagger that can kill him before he is resurrected, only to find that the body she stabbed in the display's sarcophagus is a decoy and that the Emperor's body is concealed within the terracotta sculpture of him. The Emperor is revived, and Lin fails to kill him in the ensuing chase. She guides the O'Connells to Shangri-La in the Himalayas, summoning the aid of the yeti living there. She also develops feelings for Alex, but fears that they cannot be together as she is immortal and is afraid of watching him die.

Soon the Emperor breaks into Shangri-La and becomes an immortal shapeshifter, kidnapping Lin and taking her to the site where he was unearthed. Recognizing her as the daughter of General Ming, he intends to have revenge on her mother by stealing the dagger and taking Lin as his own. He raises his army and battles Zi Yuan, who had sacrificed both Lin's and her own immortality to raise an undead army to fight off the Emperor's. Meanwhile, Alex rescues Lin. The Emperor mortally wounds Yuan, who steals back the dagger and gives it to the O'Connells, and tells a despondent Lin to live and to fight on. After the Emperor is defeated, the now-mortal Lin settles with Alex.

=== Ming Guo ===
General Ming Guo (portrayed by Russell Wong) was the Emperor's second-in-command and his most trusted friend. He was sent to find Zi Yuan, a sorceress who could grant the Emperor immortality, and he fell in love with her upon first sight. The Emperor ordered Guo to never touch Yuan, but they embraced and she become pregnant with his daughter, Lin. For this treachery, Guo was executed, but not before Yuan placed a curse on the Emperor that turned him into stone. Guo was then buried under the Great Wall of China. 2,000 years later, Guo was resurrected by Yuan to lead an undead army consisting of the Emperor's enemies buried under the wall with him against the also resurrected Emperor's Terracotta Army. Although Yuan was killed at the Emperor's hands, he and his army were ultimately defeated. Victorious, Guo and his army moved onto the afterlife.

=== General Yang ===
General Yang (portrayed by Anthony Wong) is a commander of a Chinese paramilitary faction who is the Emperor's supporter and sets up the Emperor's revival. Yang is later crushed and killed along with Choi.

=== Mad Dog Maguire ===
Mad Dog Maguire (portrayed by Liam Cunningham) is a pilot and an old friend of Rick O'Connell. He helps the O'Connells make their way to Tibet on their journey to Shangri-La.

=== Roger Wilson ===
Professor Roger Wilson (portrayed by David Calder) was Alex's supporter in his expedition of the Dragon Emperor's tomb, but is really in league with General Yang, who wishes to resurrect the Emperor. After excavating the Emperor's petrified body and placed in a museum in Shanghai, Wilson requested that Rick and Evelyn Carnahan-O'Connell bring the Eye of Shangri-La to there, which would be used to resurrect the Emperor. Wilson insists that the newly resurrected Emperor take him with him, but the Emperor kills Wilson by beheading him.

=== Colonel Choi ===
Choi (portrayed by Jessey Meng) is General Yang's assistant, second-in-command, and possibly his lover. She accompanies Yang to Shanghai when the O'Connells bring the Eye of Shangri-La to the museum to awaken the Emperor, where, after a skirmish with Evelyn, she helped General Yang revive the Dragon Emperor. Refusing to let him go despite his orders, she died with Yang when she and her superior were crushed to death inside the tomb.
