= Stephen Sommers =

American filmmaker (born 1962)

- Born: March 20, 1962 (age 64); Indianapolis, Indiana, U.S.
- Education: Saint John’s University, USC School of Cinematic Arts
- Occupations: Film director; film producer; screenwriter
- Years active: 1988–present
- Spouse: Jana Sommers (m. 1993)
- Children: 2

Stephen Sommers (born March 20, 1962) is an American film director, screenwriter and producer, best known for big-budget action films, such as The Mummy (1999), its sequel, The Mummy Returns (2001), Van Helsing (2004), and G.I. Joe: The Rise of Cobra (2009). He also directed The Adventures of Huck Finn (1993), Disney's first live action version of Rudyard Kipling's The Jungle Book (1994) and the action horror film Deep Rising (1998).

== Early life ==
Stephen Sommers was born on March 20, 1962, in Indianapolis, and grew up in St. Cloud, Minnesota, where he attended St. Cloud Apollo High School. He participated in theater. As a senior he was in the cast of Brigadoon. He is a graduate of Saint John's University in Collegeville, Minnesota, and the University of Seville in Spain. After graduating, he spent four years performing as an actor in theater groups and managing rock bands throughout Europe. He eventually returned to the United States and moved to Los Angeles, where he attended the USC School of Cinematic Arts for three years, earning a master's degree and writing and directing the award-winning short film Perfect Alibi.

== Career ==
Perfect Alibi helped Sommers acquire independent funding to write and direct his first feature film, the teen racing film Catch Me If You Can, filmed for $800,000 on location in his hometown of St. Cloud. The film was sold at the Cannes Film Festival for $7 million and later debuted on video in the United States.

Almost four years later, broke and in danger of having his house repossessed, he wrote and directed an adaptation of Mark Twain's classic The Adventures of Huck Finn for Walt Disney Pictures, as well as Rudyard Kipling's The Jungle Book. He later wrote the screenplays for Gunmen and Tom and Huck, which he also executive produced for Disney (along with a TV version of Oliver Twist in 1997 starring Richard Dreyfuss and Elijah Wood), and worked as a staff writer at Hollywood Pictures. While there, he worked on a script called Tentacle, which he later directed under the title Deep Rising in 1998.

In 1999, he wrote and directed Universal Studios' big-budget remake of The Mummy. The film was a smash hit, and Sommers received two Saturn Awards nominations for Best Director and Best Writer in 2000 by the Academy of Science Fiction, Fantasy & Horror Films. A successful sequel, The Mummy Returns, followed two years later, and he also co-wrote and produced 2002's The Scorpion King, a prequel/spin-off of The Mummy Returns.

In 2004, Sommers founded his own company (along with editor/producing partner Bob Ducsay), The Sommers Company, and returned to theater screens with Van Helsing, a film pitting legendary vampire hunter Gabriel Van Helsing against the triumvirate of Universal movie monsters: Count Dracula, The Wolf Man, and Frankenstein's monster. Before Van Helsing even premiered, Sommers and Ducsay began developing a spin-off TV series for NBC called Transylvania. Though featuring none of the characters from the film, the series (which was to have made use of the film's Prague set) was about a young cowboy from Texas who becomes a sheriff in Transylvania, has many strange adventures, and encounters many strange creatures. Sommers and Ducsay were to have been executive producers, and Sommers wrote scripts for the pilot and first several episodes, but NBC decided not to go through with the show.

Since Van Helsing, Sommers has been attached to a number of projects. He was originally set to direct Night at the Museum, but dropped out due to creative differences. He was also attached to a remake of When Worlds Collide (to be executive produced by Steven Spielberg), a new big-screen adaptation of Flash Gordon, a swashbuckling adventure film called Airborn based on the novel by Kenneth Oppel, a romantic/adventure story called The Big Love based on the novel by Sarah Dunn, and a remake of the French film Les Victimes. Sommers opted out of directing the third Mummy film, titled The Mummy: Tomb of the Dragon Emperor, instead becoming one of its producers.

Sommers directed Paramount Pictures' 2009 live-action adaptation of G.I. Joe: The Rise of Cobra, and also served as a producer. Around that time, he was developing a Tarzan adaptation for Warner Bros. but left the project. His most recent film, Odd Thomas, had been delayed from release due to lawsuits against the production company, but was eventually released.

== Filmography ==
=== Film ===
| Year | Title | Director | Writer | Producer | Notes |
|---|---|---|---|---|---|
| 1988 | Perfect Alibi | Yes | Yes | Yes | Short film |
| 1989 | Catch Me If You Can | Yes | Yes | No | Feature directorial debut |
| 1993 | The Adventures of Huck Finn | Yes | Yes | No | |
| 1994 | Gunmen | No | Yes | No | |
| 1994 | The Jungle Book | Yes | Yes | No | |
| 1995 | Tom and Huck | No | Yes | Executive | |
| 1998 | Deep Rising | Yes | Yes | No | |
| 1999 | The Mummy | Yes | Yes | No | |
| 2001 | The Mummy Returns | Yes | Yes | No | |
| 2002 | The Scorpion King | No | Yes | Yes | |
| 2004 | Van Helsing | Yes | Yes | Yes | |
| 2009 | G.I. Joe: The Rise of Cobra | Yes | Story | Executive | |
| 2013 | Odd Thomas | Yes | Yes | Yes | |

Producer

- The Mummy: Tomb of the Dragon Emperor (2008)

Executive producer

- Van Helsing: The London Assignment (2004) (short film)
- The Scorpion King 3: Battle for Redemption (2012)
- G.I. Joe: Retaliation (2013)
- The Scorpion King 4: Quest for Power (2015)
- The Scorpion King: Book of Souls (2018)

=== Television ===
| Year | Title | Writer | Executive producer | Notes |
|---|---|---|---|---|
| 2001–2003 | The Mummy | No | Yes | |

== Accolades ==
| Year | Award | Category | Film | Result |
|---|---|---|---|---|
| 1999 | Eyegore Award | | | Won |
| 2000 | Saturn Awards | Best Director | The Mummy | Nominated |
| 2000 | Saturn Awards | Best Writing | The Mummy | Nominated |
| 2010 | Golden Raspberry Award | Worst Director | G.I. Joe: The Rise of Cobra | Nominated |
