= The Mummy (franchise) =

Universal Pictures media franchise

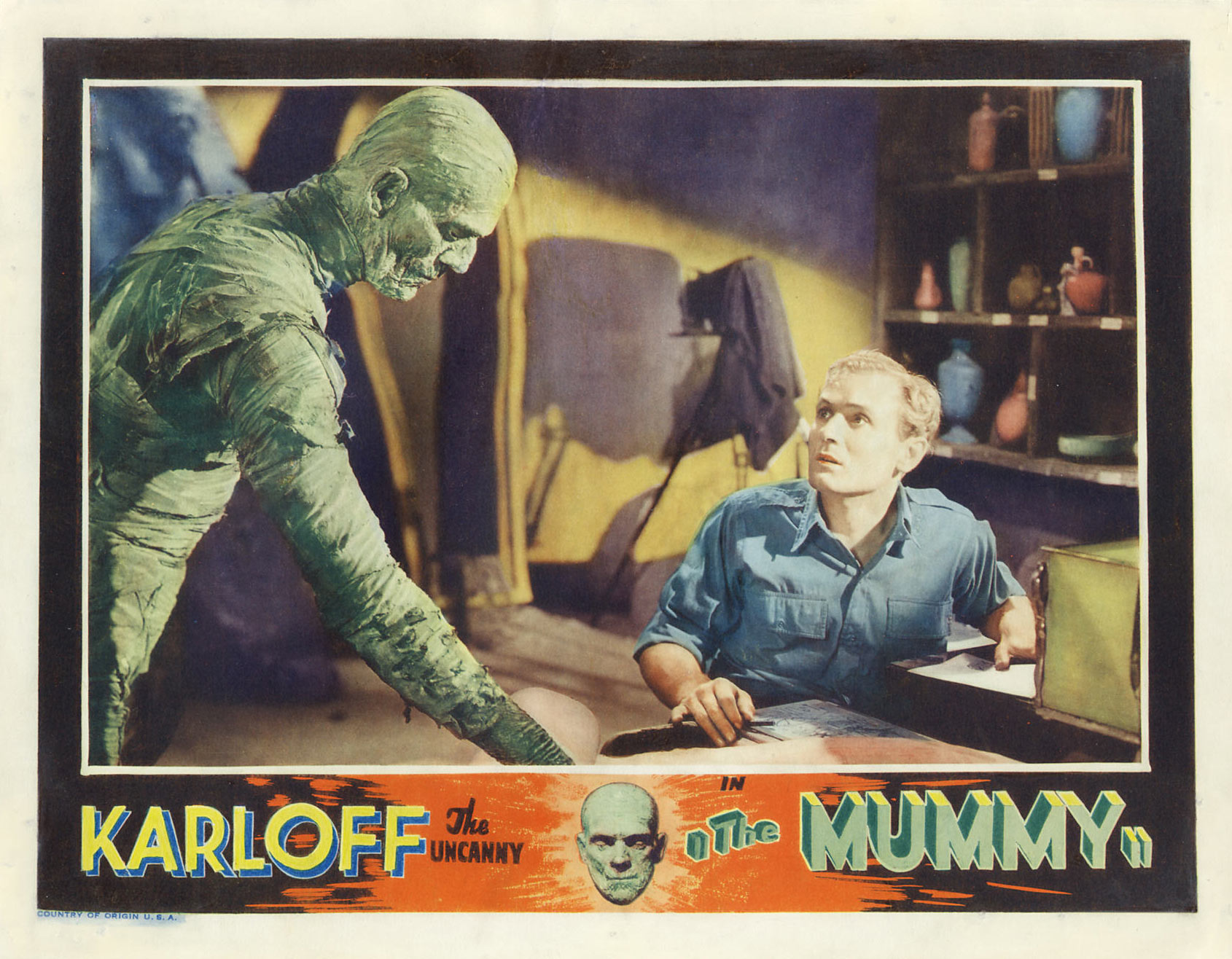
The Mummy (1932) film poster

The Mummy is a media franchise based on films by Universal Pictures about a mummified ancient Egyptian priest who is accidentally resurrected, bringing with him a powerful curse, and the ensuing efforts of heroic archaeologists to stop him. The franchise was created by Nina Wilcox Putnam and Richard Schayer.

== Original series (1932–1955) ==
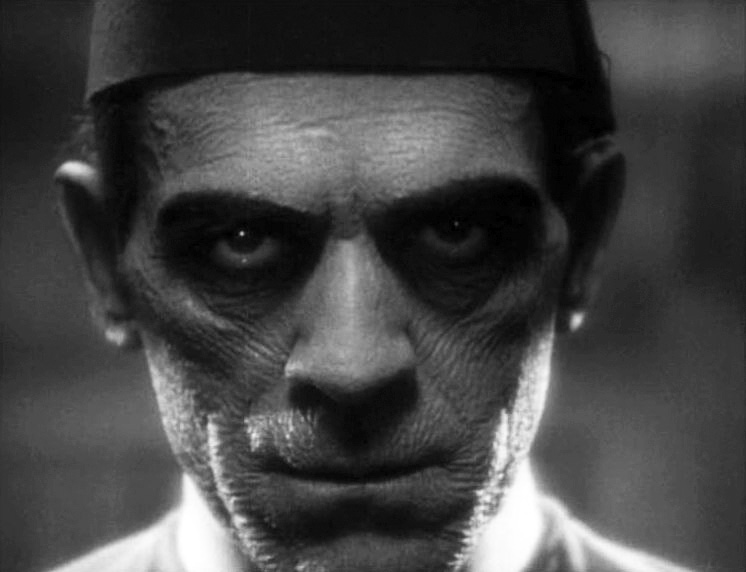
Boris Karloff as The Mummy (1932)

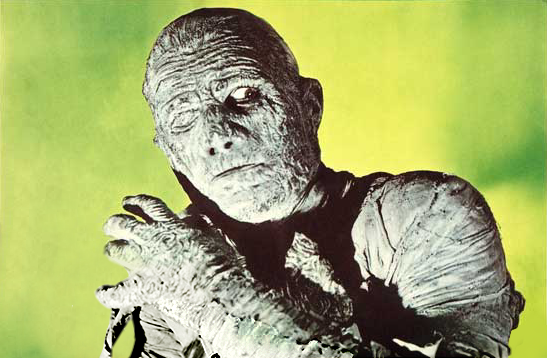
Lon Chaney Jr. as the Mummy in The Mummy's Ghost (1944)

The original series of films consists of six installments, which star iconic horror actors such as Boris Karloff (only in the original one, as Imhotep); and both Tom Tyler and Lon Chaney Jr. as Kharis. The series of films is part of the larger Universal Classic Monsters series.

Year	Film	The Mummy actor
1932	The Mummy	Boris Karloff
1940	The Mummy's Hand	Tom Tyler
1942	The Mummy's Tomb	Lon Chaney Jr.
1944	The Mummy's Ghost	Lon Chaney Jr.
1944	The Mummy's Curse	Lon Chaney Jr.
1955	Abbott and Costello Meet the Mummy	Eddie Parker

=== The Mummy (1932) ===
When archaeologists awaken the tomb of the mummy Imhotep, he sets out to find the reincarnation of his long-lost love Anck-es-en-Amon.

=== The Mummy's Hand (1940) ===
Steve Banning and his assistant Babe Jenson, who are being watched by spies, decide to fund an expedition. Magician The Great Solvani and his beautiful daughter Marta join the expedition, but when they awaken the tomb of the mummy, Kharis, they don't know whether they are going to survive the expedition.

=== The Mummy's Tomb (1942) ===
The mummy, Kharis is back after he was lit on fire 30 years ago. Steve Banning has now become a famous archaeologist and is living in the peaceful town of Mapleton, Massachusetts. The town becomes less peaceful, however, when Steve is murdered by an unknown assailant. His son John tries to crack the case with some help from Babe, Steve's friend who helped defeat Kharis.

=== The Mummy's Ghost (1944) ===
After Kharis is defeated by the Banning family, a new protagonist, Tom Harvey and his girlfriend Amina Mansori, who is the reincarnation of Princess Ananka, are in conflict with Kharis, who grows closer to Amina and wants to turn her immortal, while Tom and the police try to stop him.

=== The Mummy's Curse (1944) ===
25 years later, an irrigation project in the bayous of Louisiana unearths the mummy, Kharis from his sleep and is resurrected once again. Meanwhile, Kharis' lost love Ananka also forms from a swamp, causing the monster to embrace his 3,000-year-old love after many years.

=== Abbott and Costello Meet the Mummy (1955) ===
Expatriate Americans, Pete Patterson and Freddie Franklin, are supposed to work as guardians of Kharis during its transportation, but their prospective employer, Dr. Gustav Zoomer, is murdered, and the mummy is stolen. The duo is left in possession of a sacred medallion which supposedly records the location of a hidden treasure. They get acquainted with treasure hunter Madame Rontru and with the modern followers of Kharis.

== Hammer series (1959–1971) ==
In 1959, the franchise was rebooted, starring Peter Cushing and Christopher Lee. Though the title suggests Universal Pictures' 1932 film of the same title, the film actually derives its plot and characters entirely from two 1940s Universal films, The Mummy's Hand and The Mummy's Tomb, with the climax borrowed directly from The Mummy's Ghost. The character name Joseph Whemple, the use of a sacred scroll and a few minor plot elements are the only connections with the 1932 version. The films afterwards act as spin-offs in the same franchise, focusing on other mummies.

=== The Mummy (1959) ===
In 1895, British archaeologists find and open the tomb of Egyptian princess Ananka with nefarious consequences.

=== The Curse of the Mummy's Tomb (1964) ===
British archaeologists and their American investor Alexander King ship Egyptian mummy Ra-Antef's sarcophagus to London but someone has the amulet to revive Ra-Antef who then kills all those who disturbed his tomb.

=== The Mummy's Shroud (1967) ===
In 1920, an archaeological expedition discovers the tomb of ancient Egyptian child prince Kah-To-Bey. Returning home with their discovery, the expedition members soon find themselves being killed off by a mummy, which can be revived by reading the words off Ka-To-Bey's burial shroud.

=== Blood from the Mummy's Tomb (1971) ===
An archaeological expedition brings back to London the coffin of Egyptian queen Tera, known for her magical powers. Her spirit returns in the form of young girl Margaret Fuchs and strange things start to happen.

== Stephen Sommers/Rick O'Connell series (1999–2008, 2027) ==
The Mummy
- Trilogy box set cover
- Directed by: Stephen Sommers (1–2); Rob Cohen (3); Matt Bettinelli-Olpin and Tyler Gillett (4)
- Screenplay by: Stephen Sommers (1–2); Alfred Gough (3); Miles Millar (3); David Coggeshall (4)
- Produced by: Sean Daniel; James Jacks (1–3); Stephen Sommers (3); Bob Ducsay (3); William Sherak (4); James Vanderbilt (4); Paul Neinstein (4)
- Starring: Brendan Fraser; Rachel Weisz (1–2; 4); John Hannah; Arnold Vosloo (1–2; 4); Oded Fehr (1–2; 4); Patricia Velásquez (1–2); Kevin J. O'Connor (1, 4); Freddie Boath (2); Dwayne Johnson (2); Maria Bello (3); Luke Ford (3); Jet Li (3); Michael Johnston (4); Numan Acar (4)
- Edited by: Bob Ducsay; Ray Bushey III; Kelly Matsumoto; Joel Negron
- Music by: Jerry Goldsmith (1); Alan Silvestri (2); Randy Edelman (3); John Debney (additional music, uncredited) (3)
- Production companies: Alphaville Films (1–3); Relativity Media (3); Sommers Company (3); Project X Entertainment (4); Radio Silence Productions (4); Hivemind (4)
- Distributed by: Universal Pictures
- Running time: 368 minutes
- Country: United States
- Languages: English; Arabic; Mandarin
- Budget: $323 million
- Box office: $1.415 billion

Originally a proposed remake of The Mummy would have been directed by horror filmmaker and writer Clive Barker. Barker's vision for the film was violent, with the story revolving around the head of a contemporary art museum who turns out to be a cultist trying to reanimate mummies. Barker's take was "dark, sexual and filled with mysticism", and that, "it would have been a great low-budget movie".

In 1999, Stephen Sommers wrote and directed a remake of The Mummy, loosely based on the original film of 1932. This film switches genres from the emphasis on horror to action, concentrating more on adventure sequences, special effects, comedy, and a higher element of Egyptian lore. The film became a box office success spawning two sequels, several video games, a spin-off series and an animated television series. The first two films received mixed to positive reviews, while the third one received mostly negative reviews.

A fourth film is in production with a release date of October 15, 2027.

=== Main series ===
==== The Mummy (1999) ====
It is the year 1923 and Rick O'Connell, an American explorer and treasure hunter, has discovered Hamunaptra, the city of the dead. Three years later, he meets with a beautiful librarian, Evelyn "Evy" Carnahan and her brother, Jonathan. When Evy accidentally revives the mummified corpse of an Egyptian priest, Imhotep, the pair must find a way to kill him before he rises back into power and destroys the world.

==== The Mummy Returns (2001) ====
In 1933, Rick and Evy are married with an 8-year-old son, Alex. When Alex triggers a curse and Imhotep is resurrected, Rick and Evy must once again try to save the world and fight both Imhotep and the Scorpion King.

==== The Mummy: Tomb of the Dragon Emperor (2008) ====
Set in 1947, the film continues the adventures of Rick, his wife Evy and their son Alex against a different mummy, the Dragon Emperor Qin Shi Huang of China.

==== The Mummy: Book of the Dead (2027) ====
After Tomb of the Dragon Emperor was released, actress Maria Bello stated that another Mummy film would "absolutely" be made, and that she had already signed on. Actor Luke Ford was signed on for three films as well. In 2012, Universal Pictures cancelled the film and later developed a reboot of the series.

In November 2025, a fourth film was reported to be in development with Matt Bettinelli-Olpin and Tyler Gillett attached to direct and David Coggeshall writing. Fraser and Weisz are slated to reprise their roles. In an interview made while promoting Rental Family, Fraser later mentioned it saying "the one I wanted to make…is forthcoming" and that it was time to "give the fans what they want". In a January 2026 interview with the Radio Times, however, Fraser seemed to suggest that a fourth film was not guaranteed, though he would want to be involved if there was one. The film was officially confirmed the following month alongside the involvement of Olpin, Gillett, Fraser and Weisz with a May 19, 2028, release date. That March, John Hannah was revealed to reprise his role as Jonathan Carnahan. In April 2026, the film's release date was moved backward to October 15, 2027. On June 14, 2026, during the 65th Monte-Carlo Television Festival, Hannah confirmed the presence of Arnold Vosloo and Kevin J. O'Connor in the cast of the new film. On July 27, 2026, Michael Johnston was revealed to be in talks to join the cast. In August 2026, O'Connor and Oded Fehr were announced to reprise their roles as Beni Gabor and Ardeth Bay, respectively, and that Numan Acar had joined the cast. Filming began on September 7, 2026.

==== Critical and public response ====
Film	Critical		Public
Film	Rotten Tomatoes	Metacritic	CinemaScore
The Mummy	63% (106 reviews)	48 (34 reviews)	B
The Mummy Returns	46% (141 reviews)	48 (31 reviews)	A−
The Mummy: Tomb of the Dragon Emperor	13% (176 reviews)	31 (33 reviews)	B−

=== The Scorpion King spin-off series ===
This spin-off series is set before the events of Sommers's Mummy franchise. It follows the adventures of Mathayus of Akkad, later known as the Scorpion King within the series's timeline and an antagonist in The Mummy Returns.

==== The Scorpion King (2002) ====
Set in 3067 BC, the film reveals the origins of Mathayus and his rise to power as a legendary hero.

==== The Scorpion King 2: Rise of a Warrior (2008) ====
A prequel to The Scorpion King, it follows a young Mathayus who witnesses the death of his father Ashur at the hands of evil military commander Sargon. Mathayus's quest for vengeance transforms him into the most feared warrior of the ancient world.

==== The Scorpion King 3: Battle for Redemption (2012) ====
A sequel set after the events of The Scorpion King, the film continues the story of Mathayus, now an assassin-for-hire, and portrays his battle to stop the tyrant Talus from claiming the Book of the Dead.

==== The Scorpion King 4: Quest for Power (2015) ====
Mathayus is betrayed and framed by his friend Drazen for the murder of King Yannick of Norvania. Mathayus and his friends band together to stop his opponent from obtaining an ancient power.

==== The Scorpion King: Book of Souls (2018) ====
Mathayus is joined by the warrior Tala in a hunt for an ancient relic known as the Book of Souls in an effort to stop evil warlord Nebserek.

==== Future ====
In November 2020, a reboot of The Scorpion King film series was announced to be in development. Jonathan Herman was attached to serve as screenwriter, with the plot taking place in modern-day and involving a contemporary adaptation of Mathayus of Akkad / Scorpion King. Dwayne Johnson was hired as producer alongside Dany Garcia and Hiram Garcia. The project is a joint-venture production between Universal Pictures and Seven Bucks Productions.

== Dark Universe (2017) ==
=== The Mummy (2017) ===
U.S. Army Sergeant Nick Morton, a soldier of fortune, accidentally unearths the ancient tomb of entrapped Egyptian princess Ahmanet. When she awakens from the tomb and unleashes the evils on the world, Nick teams up with allies to stop her.

A reboot of the series, the film stars Tom Cruise, Sofia Boutella, Annabelle Wallis, Russell Crowe and Jake Johnson. Directed by Alex Kurtzman and written by David Koepp, Christopher McQuarrie and Dylan Kussman (based on the story by Jon Spaihts), the film was released in 2017. Several directors and writers were attached to the project at one point, such as Len Wiseman, Andy Muschietti and Billy Ray.

The Mummy was originally developed as the first entry of the new shared universe franchise titled Dark Universe by Universal Pictures, who hired Alex Kurtzman and Chris Morgan to develop all classic movie monsters such as Dracula, Frankenstein, The Wolf Man, Creature from the Black Lagoon, The Invisible Man, Bride of Frankenstein, Dr. Jekyll and Mr. Hyde, Abraham Van Helsing, and the Mummy. The film, however, became a critical and commercial failure, causing all the future planned films in the Dark Universe to be cancelled.

== Warner Bros. ==
While Universal-International produced and originally distributed the film, Warner Bros. Pictures would later acquire the distribution rights to the 1959 Hammer remake around 1985 and has been releasing the film on home video and streaming ever since.

=== Lee Cronin's The Mummy (2026) ===
Katie Cannon, the young daughter of journalist Charlie Cannon, disappears without a trace in the desert. Eight years later, the devastated family is stunned when Katie suddenly reappears. However, what should be a joyful reunion soon turns into a terrifying nightmare.

Starring Jack Reynor, Laia Costa, May Calamawy, Natalie Grace and Hayat Kamille in the main roles, the film was directed and written by Lee Cronin. The film was developed by New Line Cinema, Atomic Monster, Blumhouse Productions, and Wicked/Good. It has been described as a reboot of the Mummy franchise and the first film in it to be distributed by Warner Bros. Pictures since The Mummy (1959). The film was released on April 17, 2026.

== Full-length films ==
Continuity	Title	Release date	Director
Universal Classic Monsters	The Mummy	December 22, 1932	Karl Freund
Universal Classic Monsters	The Mummy's Hand	September 20, 1940	Christy Cabanne
Universal Classic Monsters	The Mummy's Tomb	October 23, 1942	Harold Young
Universal Classic Monsters	The Mummy's Ghost	July 7, 1944	Reginald LeBorg
Universal Classic Monsters	The Mummy's Curse	December 22, 1944	Leslie Goodwins
Universal Classic Monsters	Abbott and Costello Meet the Mummy	April 16, 1955	Charles Lamont
Hammer series	The Mummy	September 25, 1959	Terence Fisher
Hammer series	The Curse of the Mummy's Tomb	October 18, 1964	Michael Carreras
Hammer series	The Mummy's Shroud	March 15, 1967	John Gilling
Hammer series	Blood from the Mummy's Tomb	October 14, 1971	Seth Holt, Michael Carreras
The Rick O'Connell series	The Mummy	May 7, 1999	Stephen Sommers
The Rick O'Connell series	The Mummy Returns	May 4, 2001	Stephen Sommers
The Rick O'Connell series	The Mummy: Tomb of the Dragon Emperor	August 1, 2008	Rob Cohen
The Rick O'Connell series	The Mummy: Book of the Dead	October 15, 2027	Matt Bettinelli-Olpin, Tyler Gillett
Dark Universe	The Mummy	June 9, 2017	Alex Kurtzman
Warner Bros.	Lee Cronin's The Mummy	April 17, 2026	Lee Cronin

== Cast and crew ==
=== Cast ===
List indicators

This section includes characters who will appear or have appeared in the franchise.

- An empty grey cell indicates the character was not in the film, or that the character's official presence has not yet been confirmed.
- ^{A} indicates an appearance through archival footage or audio.
- ^{V} indicates a voice-only role.
- ^{Y} indicates a younger version of the character.

Character	Classic series					Rick O'Connell series					Dark Universe	Warner Bros.
Character	The Mummy	The Mummy's Hand	The Mummy's Tomb	The Mummy's Ghost	The Mummy's Curse	The Mummy	The Mummy Returns	The Mummy: Tomb of the Dragon Emperor	The Mummy: Book of the Dead	The Mummy	The Mummy	Lee Cronin's The Mummy
Character	1932	1940	1942	1944		1999	2001	2008	2027	2001–2003	2017	2026
Imhotep The Mummy	Boris Karloff	Boris Karloff^{A}				Arnold Vosloo	Arnold Vosloo		Arnold Vosloo	Jim Cummings^{V}		
Ankh-es-en-Amon / Anck-su-namun Helen Grosvenor / Meela Nais	Zita Johann					Patricia Velásquez	Patricia Velásquez			Lenore Zann^{V}		
Ardeth Bay						Oded Fehr	Oded Fehr		Oded Fehr	Nicholas Guest^{V}		
Frank Whemple	David Manners											
Sir Joseph Whemple	Arthur Byron											
Ralph Norton	Bramwell Fletcher											
Dr. Muller	Edward Van Sloan											
Kharis The Mummy		Tom Tyler	Lon Chaney Jr.	Lon Chaney Jr.	Lon Chaney Jr.							
Steve Banning		Dick Foran	Dick Foran									
Babe Hanson (née Jenson)		Wallace Ford	Wallace Ford									
Professor Andoheb / The High Priest		George Zucco	George Zucco	George Zucco								
Dr. Charles Petrie		Charles Trowbridge										
Marta Solvani		Peggy Moran										
The Great Solvani		Cecil Kellaway										
Mehemet Bey			Turhan Bey									
Dr. John Banning			John Hubbard									
Isobel Evans Banning			Elyse Knox									
Professor Norman			Frank Reicher	Frank Reicher								
Yousef Bey				John Carradine								
Tom Hervey				Robert Lowery								
Princess Ananka Amina Mansori				Ramsay Ames	Virginia Christine							
Inspector Walgreen				Barton MacLane								
Sheriff Elwood				Harry Shannon								
Dr. James Halsey Dr. Jenny Halsey					Dennis Moore						Annabelle Wallis	
Betty Walsh					Kay Harding							
Pat Walsh					Addison Richards							
Dr. Ilzor Zandaab					Peter Coe							
Ragheb					Martin Kosleck							
Cajun Joe					Kurt Katch							
Rick O'Connell						Brendan Fraser	Brendan Fraser	Brendan Fraser	Brendan Fraser	John Schneider^{V}		
Evelyn Carnahan O'Connell / Princess Nefertiri						Rachel Weisz	Rachel Weisz	Maria Bello	Rachel Weisz	Grey DeLisle^{V}		
Jonathan Carnahan						John Hannah	John Hannah	John Hannah	John Hannah	Tom Kenny^{V}		
Pharaoh Seti I						Aharon Ipalé	Aharon Ipalé					
Beni Gabor						Kevin J. O'Connor			Kevin J. O'Connor			
Dr. Allen Chamberlain						Jonathan Hyde						
Dr. Terrance Bey						Erick Avari						
Isaac Henderson						Stephen Dunham						
David Daniels						Corey Johnson						
Bernard Burns						Tuc Watkins						
Warden Gad Hassan						Omid Djalili						
Captain Winston Havlock						Bernard Fox						
Alexander "Alex" Rupert O'Connell							Freddie Boath	Luke Ford	TBA	Chris Marquette^{V}		
Mathayus The Scorpion King							Dwayne Johnson					
Baltus Hafez							Alun Armstrong					
Lock-Nah							Adewale Akinnuoye-Agbaje					
Izzy Buttons							Shaun Parkes					
Red Willits							Bruce Byron					
Jacques Clemons							Joe Dixon					
Jacob Spivey							Tom Fisher					
Han The Dragon Emperor / The Mummy								Jet Li				
General Yang								Anthony Wong				
Lin								Isabella Leong				
Mad Dog Maguire								Liam Cunningham				
Professor Roger Wilson								David Calder				
General Ming Guo								Russell Wong				
Zi-Yuan								Michelle Yeoh				
Sgt. Nick Morton Set / The Mummy											Tom Cruise	
Princess Ahmanet The Mummy											Sofia Boutella	
Cpl. Chris Vail											Jake Johnson	
Dr. Henry Jekyll / Mr. Eddie Hyde											Russell Crowe	
Col. Gideon Greenway											Courtney B. Vance	
Jack Reynor												Charlie Cannon
Laia Costa												Larissa Cannon
May Calamawy												Detective Dalia Zaki
Natalie Grace												Katie Cannon
Emily Mitchell^{Y}												Katie Cannon
Shylo Molin												Sebastián "Seb" Cannon
Dean Allen Williams^{Y}												Sebastián "Seb" Cannon
Billie Roy												Maud "Maudie" Cannon
Verónica Falcón												Carmen Santiago
Hayat Kamille												Layla's mother
May Elghety												Layla Khalil
Aisha Laouini^{Y}												Layla Khalil
Husam Chadat												Detective Ismail
Mark Mitchinson												Professor Bixler
Lily Sullivan												Miss Mills
Omar El-Saeidi												Gamal Khalil
Arkin Cureklibatir												Jabari Khalil
Safi Mulki												Tariq Khalil

=== Crew ===
Crew / detail	Film									
Crew / detail	Classic series					Rick O'Connell series			Dark Universe	New Line Cinema
Crew / detail	The Mummy	The Mummy's Hand	The Mummy's Tomb	The Mummy's Ghost	The Mummy's Curse	The Mummy	The Mummy Returns	The Mummy: Tomb of the Dragon Emperor	The Mummy	Lee Cronin's The Mummy
Crew / detail	1932	1940	1942	1944		1999	2001	2008	2017	2026
Director	Karl Freund	Christy Cabanne	Harold Young	Reginald LeBorg	Leslie Goodwins	Stephen Sommers	Stephen Sommers	Rob Cohen	Alex Kurtzman	Lee Cronin
Producer(s)	Carl Laemmle Jr.	Ben Pivar	Ben Pivar	Ben Pivar	Oliver Drake; Ben Pivar	Sean Daniel; James Jacks	Sean Daniel; James Jacks	Sean Daniel; James Jacks; Bob Ducsay; Stephen Sommers	Sean Daniel; Alex Kurtzman; Roberto Orci; Chris Morgan	Lee Cronin; James Wan; Jason Blum; John Keville
Writer(s)	Screenplay: John L. Balderston; Story: Nina Wilcox Putnam & Richard Schayer	Griffen Jay; Maxwell Shane	Story: Neil P. Varnick	Griffin Jay; Henry Sucher	Leon Abrams; Dwight V. Babcock	Screenplay: Stephen Sommers Story: Stephen Sommers, Lloyd Fonvielle & Kevin Jarre	Stephen Sommers	Alfred Gough; Miles Millar	Screenplay: David Koepp; Christopher McQuarrie; Dylan Kussman Story: Jon Spaihts; Alex Kurtzman; Jenny Lumet	Lee Cronin
Composer(s)	James Dietrich	Frank Skinner; Hans J. Salter	—N/a	Frank Skinner (uncredited)	William Lava; Paul Sawtell	Jerry Goldsmith	Alan Silvestri	Randy Edelman	Brian Tyler	Stephen McKeon
Editor(s)	Milton Carruth	Philip Cahn	Milton Carruth	Saul A. Goodkind	Fred R. Feitshans Jr.	Bob Ducsay	Bob Ducsay; Kelly Matsumoto	Joel Negron; Kelly Matsumoto	Paul Hirsch	Bryan Shaw
Cinematographer	Charles J. Stumar	Elwood Bredell	George Robinson	William Sickner	Virgil Miller	Adrian Biddle	Adrian Biddle	Simon Duggan	Ben Seresin	Dave Garbett
Production companies	Universal Pictures	Universal Pictures	Universal Pictures	Universal Pictures	Universal Pictures	Alphaville Films	Alphaville Films	Relativity Media; Sommers Company; Alphaville Films	K/O Paper Products; Sean Daniel Company	New Line Cinema; Blumhouse Productions; Atomic Monster; Wicked/Good
Distributor	Universal Pictures	Universal Pictures	Universal Pictures	Universal Pictures	Universal Pictures	Universal Pictures	Universal Pictures	Universal Pictures	Universal Pictures	Warner Bros. Pictures
Runtime	1 hour, 13 minutes	1 hour, 7 minutes	1 hour, 1 minute	1 hour, 1 minute	1 hour, 2 minutes	2 hours, 5 minutes	2 hours, 10 minutes	1 hour, 51 minutes	1 hour, 50 minutes	2 hours, 13 minutes
Release date	December 2, 1932	September 2, 1940	October 2, 1942	July 7, 1944	December 2, 1944	May 7, 1999	May 4, 2001	August 1, 2008	June 9, 2017	April 1, 2026

== Other media ==
=== Video games ===
Two video game adaptations of The Mummy (1999) were developed by Rebellion Developments and published by Konami in 2000: an action adventure game for the PlayStation and PC as well as a Game Boy Color puzzle game. A Dreamcast version was announced, but later cancelled in late 2000. The Mummy Returns was released in late 2001 for the PlayStation 2, developed by Blitz Games, along with a Game Boy Color version developed by GameBrains; both versions were published by Universal Interactive. The Mummy: Tomb of the Dragon Emperor was released in 2008, developed by Eurocom for the PlayStation 2 and the Wii, while the Nintendo DS version was developed by A2M; all published by Sierra Entertainment. In March 2012, a massive multiplayer online game known as The Mummy Online was released. The Mummy Demastered and The Mummy: Dark Universe Stories, based on the 2017 film The Mummy were released that same year.

The Mummy and characters from the franchise were featured in the video game, Funko Fusion, which was released in 2024.

=== Comic books ===
In May 2001, Chaos! Comics released the first of a three-issue series inspired by the film, titled The Mummy: Valley of the Gods. The plot was supposed to take place between the first film and The Mummy Returns. Rick and Evelyn are on their honeymoon in Egypt and end up embarking on yet another adventure where they must unravel the mysteries of the Orb of Destiny and discover the location of the Valley of the Gods hidden beneath the sands. The second and third issues, however, were never published. This was most likely due to Chaos later filing bankruptcy in 2002 and selling the rights to all their titles at that time. Years later in 2008, another Mummy comic series was released by IDW Publishing, spanning four issues. This series was titled The Mummy: The Rise and Fall of Xango's Ax. Unlike the preceding comic series, all of the planned issues were published.

=== Television ===
An animated series simply titled The Mummy based on the Stephen Sommers series of films was made by Universal Animation Studios. The series was later renamed in the second season as The Mummy: Secrets of the Medjai. It aired between 2001 and 2003.

=== Theme park rides ===
The film also inspired a roller coaster ride named Revenge of the Mummy in Universal Studios Theme Parks, Florida. Similar rides can also be found in Hollywood and Singapore. A mummy identified as Ankhsenamun appears in the Monsters Unchained: The Frankenstein Experiment ride at Universal Epic Universe.

== See also ==
- Universal Monsters
  - Dracula (Universal film series)
  - Frankenstein (Universal film series)
  - The Invisible Man (film series)
  - The Wolf Man (franchise)
