= The Mummy (1959 film) =

- American theatrical release poster
- Directed by: Terence Fisher
- Screenplay by: Jimmy Sangster
- Based on: The Mummy by: John L. Balderston; Nina Wilcox Putnam; Richard Schayer
- Produced by: Michael Carreras
- Starring: Peter Cushing; Christopher Lee; Yvonne Furneaux
- Cinematography: Jack Asher
- Edited by: Alfred Cox; James Needs
- Music by: Franz Reizenstein
- Color process: Technicolor
- Production company: Hammer Film Productions
- Distributed by: Rank Film Distributors (UK); Universal-International (International)
- Release dates: 25 September 1959 (UK); December 1959 (US).
- Running time: 88 minutes
- Country: United Kingdom
- Language: English
- Budget: £125,000 or £100,000
- Box office: 857,243 admissions (France)

The Mummy is a 1959 British horror film directed by Terence Fisher and starring Peter Cushing, Christopher Lee and Yvonne Furneaux. It was written by Jimmy Sangster, and produced by Michael Carreras and Anthony Nelson Keys for Hammer Film Productions. The film was distributed in the UK on 25 September 1959, and in the U.S. in December, 1959 on a double bill with either The Bat or Curse of the Undead.

== Plot ==
In Egypt in 1895, archaeologists John Banning, his father Stephen and his uncle Joseph Whemple are searching for the tomb of Princess Ananka, the high priestess of the god Karnak. John has a broken leg and cannot accompany his father and uncle when they open the tomb. Before they enter, an Egyptian named Mehemet Bey warns them not to go in, lest they face the fatal curse against desecrators. Stephen and Joseph ignore him, and discover within the sarcophagus of Ananka. After Joseph leaves to tell John the good news, Stephen finds the Scroll of Life and reads from it. Outside, members of the archaeological team hear his screams and rush into the tomb to find Stephen in a catatonic state.

Three years later, back in England, Stephen Banning comes out of his catatonia at the Engerfield Nursing Home for the Mentally Disordered, and sends for his son. He explains that when he read from the Scroll of Life, he unintentionally brought back to life Kharis, the mummified high priest of Karnak. The high priest had been sentenced to be entombed alive to serve as the guardian of Princess Ananka's tomb: Kharis secretly loved the princess and attempted to restore her to life after she died; when he was discovered, eternal life and mummification were his punishment. Now, Stephen tells his disbelieving son that Kharis will hunt down and kill all those who desecrated Ananka's tomb.

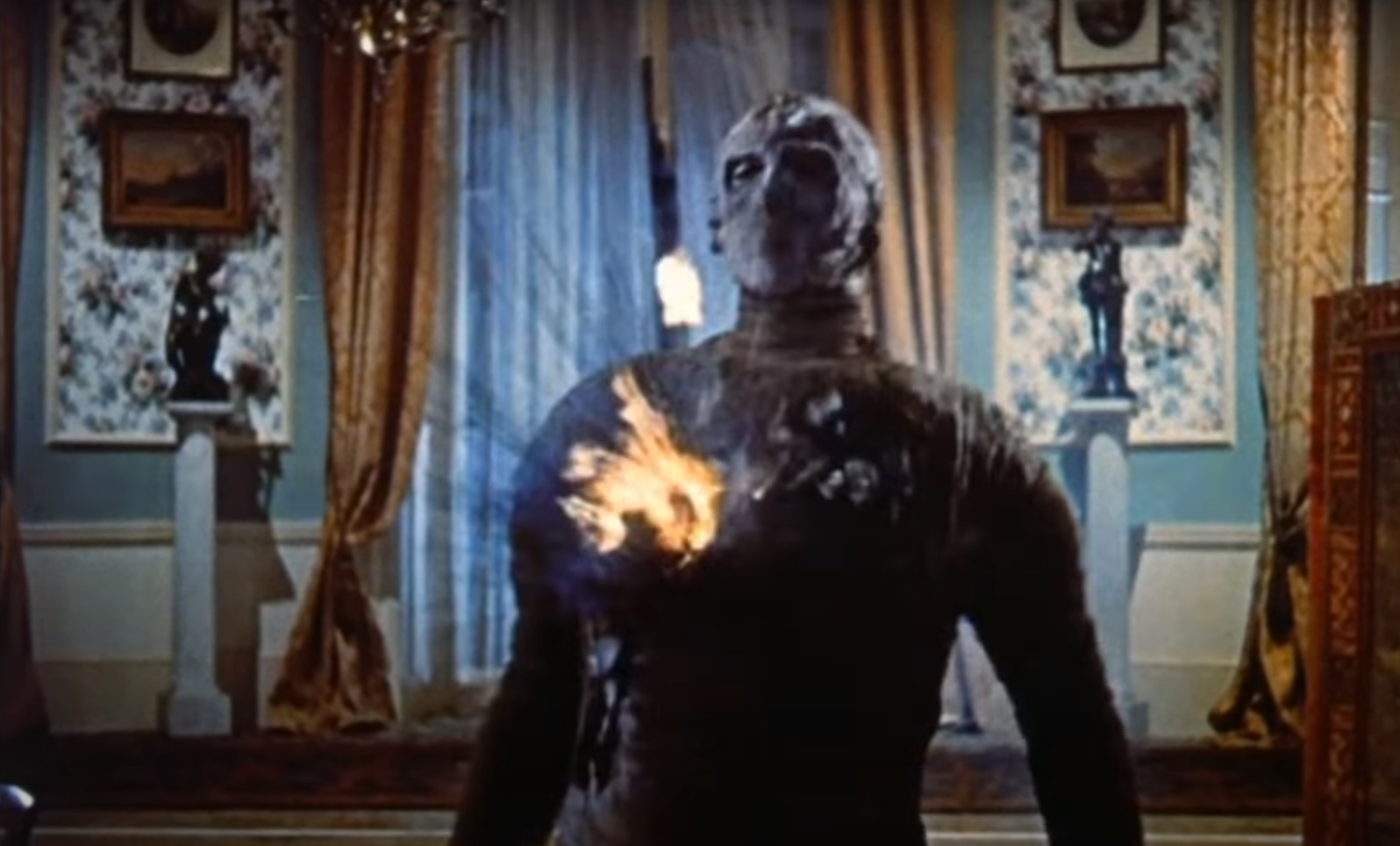
Kharis, shot by Banning.

Meanwhile, Mehemet Bey, a devoted worshiper of Karnak, comes to Engerfield under the alias of Mehemet Atkil to wreak vengeance on the Bannings. He hires a pair of drunken carters, Pat and Mike, to bring the slumbering Kharis in a crate to his rented home, but the two men's drunken driving cause Kharis's crate to fall off and sink into a bog. Later, using the Scroll of Life, Mehemet exhorts Kharis to rise from the mud, then sends him to murder Stephen Banning. When Kharis kills Joseph Whemple the next night, John witnesses it. He shoots Kharis with a revolver at close range, but to no effect.

Police Inspector Mulrooney is assigned to solve the murders but, because he is skeptical and deals only in "cold, hard facts", he does not believe John's incredible story about a killer mummy, even when John tells him that he is likely to be Kharis' third victim. While Mulrooney investigates, John notices that his wife Isobel bears an uncanny resemblance to Princess Ananka. Gathering testimonial evidence from other individuals in the community, Mulrooney slowly begins to wonder if the mummy is real.

Mehemet sends the mummy to the Bannings' home to slay his final victim. However, when Isobel rushes to her husband's aid, Kharis sees her, releases John, and leaves. Mehemet mistakenly believes that Kharis has completed his task, and prepares to return to Egypt. John, suspecting Mehemet of being the one controlling the mummy, pays him a visit, much to Mehemet's surprise.

After John leaves, Mehemet leads Kharis in a second attempt on John's life. The mummy knocks Mulrooney unconscious, while Mehemet deals with another policeman guarding the house. Kharis finds John in his study and starts to choke him. Alerted by John's shouts, Isobel runs to the house without Mulrooney; at first, the mummy does not recognize her, but John tells her to loosen her hair, at which point the mummy releases John. When Mehemet orders Kharis to kill Isobel, he refuses; Mehemet tries to murder Isobel himself, but is killed by Kharis instead. The mummy carries the unconscious Isobel into the swamp, followed by John, Mulrooney, and other policemen. John yells to Isobel; when she regains consciousness, she tells Kharis to put her down. The mummy reluctantly obeys. When Isobel has moved away from him, the policemen open fire, causing Kharis to sink into a quagmire, taking the Scroll of Life with him.

== Cast ==
- Peter Cushing as John Banning
- Christopher Lee as Kharis / The Mummy
- Yvonne Furneaux as Isobel Banning / Princess Ananka
- Eddie Byrne as Inspector Mulrooney
- Felix Aylmer as Stephen Banning
- Raymond Huntley as Joseph Whemple
- George Pastell as Mehemet Bey
- Michael Ripper as poacher
- George Woodbridge as PC Blake
- Harold Goodwin as Pat
- Denis Shaw as Mike
- Gerald Lawson as Irish customer
- Willoughby Gray as Dr. Reilly
- John Stuart as Coroner
- David Browning as Police Sergeant
- Frank Sieman as Bill
- Stanley Meadows as attendant
- Frank Singuineau as Head Porter

== Production ==
Although Hammer's The Mummy shares its title with Universal Pictures' 1932 film, its story draws more heavily on three subsequent Universal productions: The Mummy's Hand (1940), The Mummy's Tomb (1942) and The Mummy's Ghost (1944). The British Film Institute particularly noted its resemblance to The Mummy's Hand, in which a resurrected mummy seeks vengeance against archaeologists who disturbed an Egyptian tomb. Elements retained from the 1932 film include the character name Joseph Whemple and a mystical scroll capable of reviving the dead. The swamp-set climax also recalls The Mummy's Ghost, although the heroine survives in Hammer's version.

Screenwriter Jimmy Sangster later acknowledged the similarities between the films but said he could not remember watching the earlier Universal productions. In an interview reproduced in Turner Classic Movies, Sangster expressed uncertainty about how else the shared character names and plot elements could be explained.

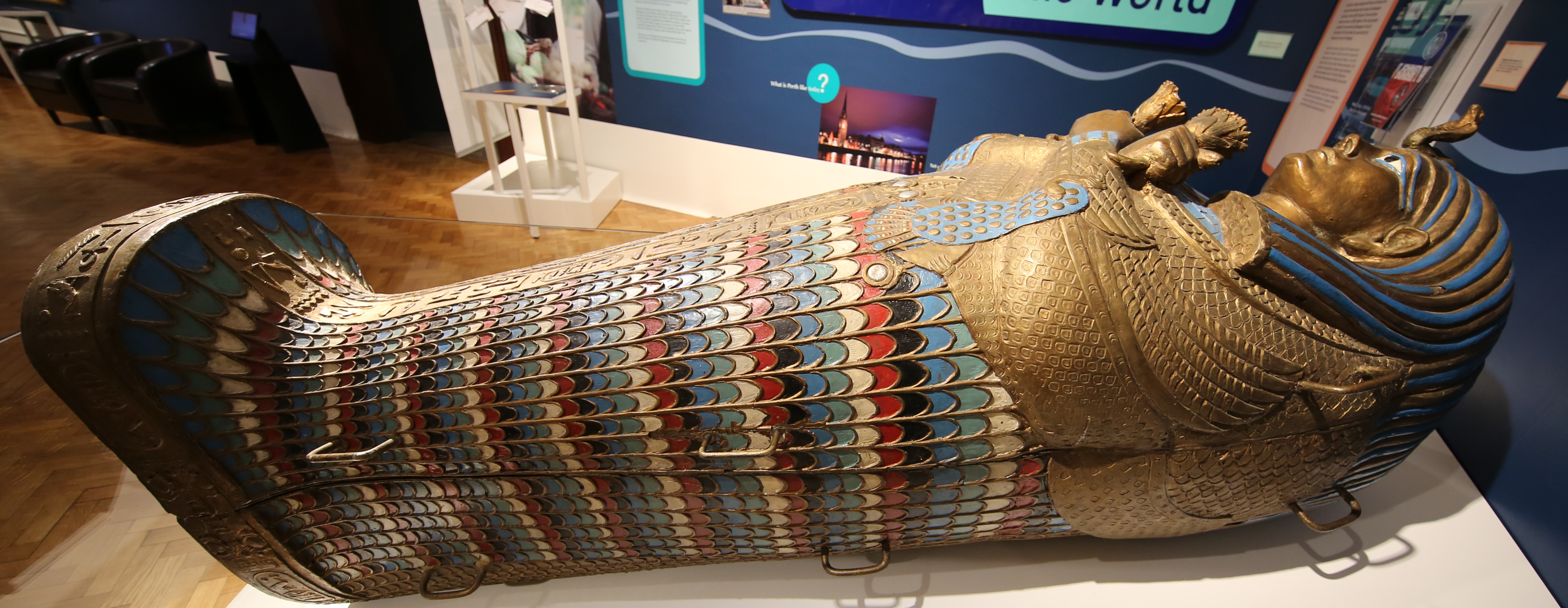
The sarcophagus prop in the Perth Art Gallery

Filming took place at Bray Film Studios in Berkshire. Originally the scenes of Kharis's tongue being cut out and shotgun demise were more graphic, but were trimmed for the British censor.

In the video, Flesh and Blood: The Hammer Heritage of Horror, Peter Cushing says he suggested the scene in which he drives a spear through the mummy. He was inspired by the pre-release poster (see image above) which shows the mummy with a shaft of light passing through it.

A fibreglass replica of a sarcophagus created for the film is in the collection of the Perth Art Gallery.

== Critical reception ==
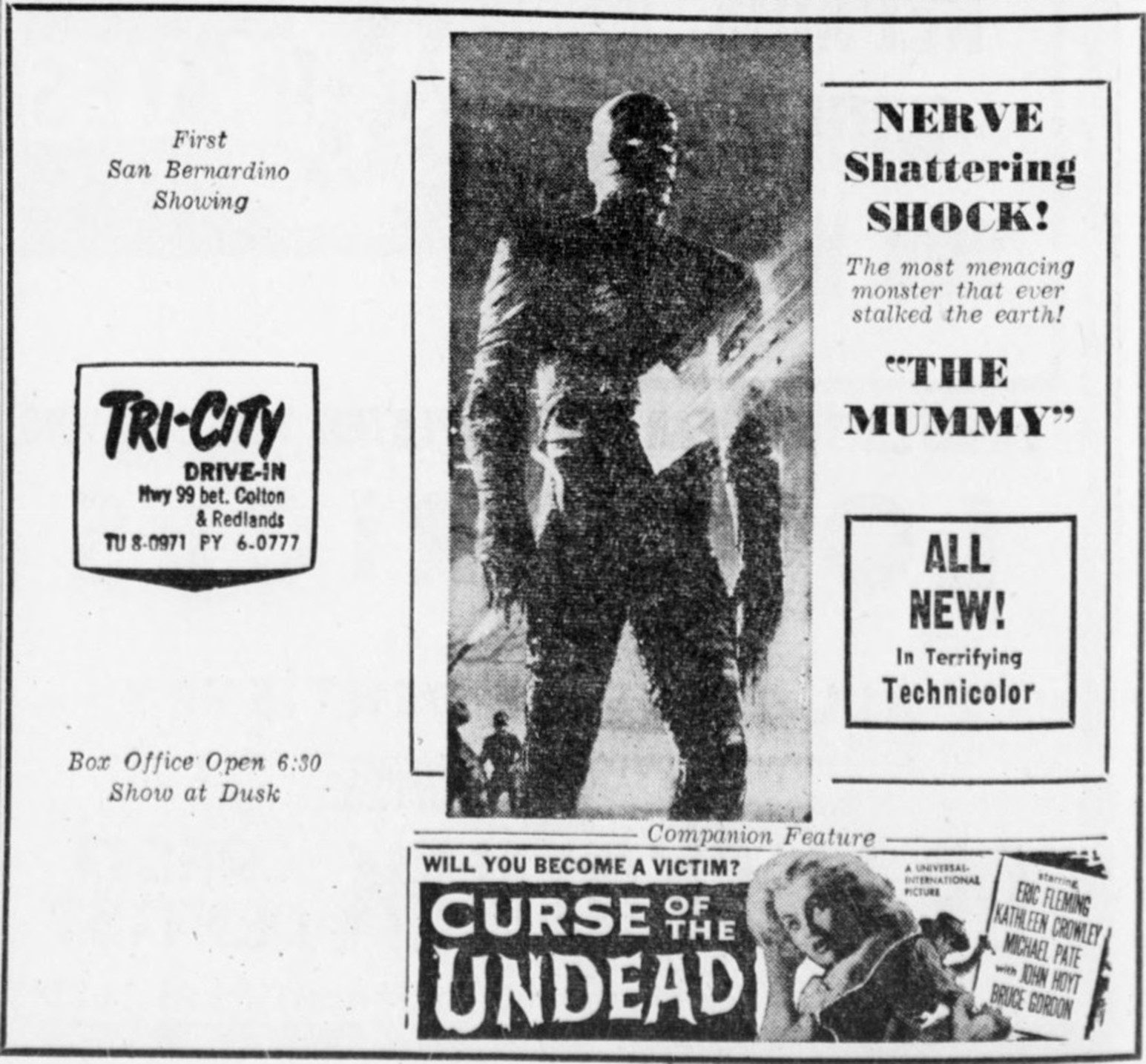
Drive-in advertisement from 1959 for The Mummy and co-feature, Curse of the Undead.

The Monthly Film Bulletin of the UK wrote: "More glamorously photographed than ever, Hammer's latest excursion into nineteenth century macabre fantasy is weighed down by wordy historical exposition, flashbacks to ancient Egyptian burial ceremonies and a resultant slackening in pace". Howard Thompson of The New York Times thought that the film was "woodenly directed" and "should have been better". Variety wrote that the film was "excellently executed" in all technical departments, and while there was "little of actual newness" to the plot, the film "carries the type of action expected, and while chiller aspects aren't too pronounced they're sufficient to those who want to find them". Harrison's Reports called it "a fairly good picture of its kind, produced on a more lavish scale than its predecessors and enhanced by Technicolor photography".

The Hammer Story: The Authorised History of Hammer Films wrote of the film: "Structurally little more than a string of picturesque and nice-lit killings, The Mummy's melancholic presentation and romantic undertow grants it a certain atmosphere which elevates this bandaged brute far beyond its cinematic predecessors". It currently holds a positive 92% "Fresh" on film review aggregate website Rotten Tomatoes based on 12 reviews.

Nina Wilcox Putnam, co-writer of the original 1932 Universal Mummy film, was highly critical of the Hammer adaption, writing in a letter to Time magazine: "This disgusting English remake was done without my knowledge or consent, and it has been a terrible shock at the age of 75, to find such a work attributed to me, however wrongly and by indirection".

== Home media ==
The Mummy was released on DVD by Warner Home Video in 2003. On 14 October 2013, Icon Film Distribution released the film on Blu-ray for the first time in the United Kingdom, alongside two DVDs. The edition presented the film in its original British theatrical aspect ratio of 1.66:1, as well as an alternative 1.37:1 full-frame version, and included an audio commentary by Hammer historians Marcus Hearn and Jonathan Rigby, documentaries about the film's production and other supplementary material.

On 6 October 2015, Warner Bros. Home Entertainment released the film on Blu-ray in the United States, both individually and as part of the four-film Horror Classics: Volume One collection. On 29 August 2022, Second Sight Films released a limited-edition Blu-ray in the United Kingdom, featuring a new audio commentary by film academic Kelly Robinson, archival documentaries and a booklet containing essays by Kat Ellinger, Lindsay Hallam and Kevin Lyons. Second Sight subsequently issued a standard Blu-ray edition on 25 May 2026.

== Legacy ==
The Mummy is regarded as one of the films that helped establish the characteristic style of Hammer's Gothic horror cycle. The British Film Institute has grouped it with The Curse of Frankenstein (1957) and Dracula (1958) as Hammer's "classic gothic trilogy". It was also the first film produced following Hammer's agreement with Universal Pictures granting the British studio access to several of Universal's classic horror properties. Turner Classic Movies described the film as one of the most memorable productions of Hammer's peak period and noted that its commercial success in Britain and overseas led the studio to revisit mummy-themed horror in The Curse of the Mummy's Tomb (1964), The Mummy's Shroud (1967) and Blood from the Mummy's Tomb (1971).

Christopher Lee's portrayal of Kharis has received particular retrospective attention. Hammer Films credited Lee with bringing a tragic quality to the largely non-verbal character through his facial expression, particularly his eyes. The BFI has similarly distinguished Lee's silent, bandaged Kharis from the mummy portrayed in Universal's original 1932 film, highlighting the character's sense of torment.

The film was a particular influence on the 1975 Doctor Who serial Pyramids of Mars. It was also adapted into a 12-page comic strip for the July 1978 issue of Hammer's Halls of Horror, written by Steve Moore and illustrated by David Jackson. The issue's cover featured a painting by Brian Lewis depicting Lee as Kharis.
