= Revenge of the Mummy =

Roller coasters at Universal parks

Revenge of the Mummy: The Ride

- Revenge of the Mummy in June 2006

Universal Studios Florida
- Park section: New York
- Coordinates: 28°28′36.84″N 81°28′11.59″W
- Status: Operating
- Opening date: May 21, 2004
- Cost: US$40 million
- Replaced: Kongfrontation (1990–2002)
- Revenge of the Mummy: The Ride at Universal Studios Florida at RCDB

Universal Studios Hollywood
- Park section: Lower Lot
- Coordinates: 34.1406°N 118.3567°W
- Status: Operating
- Opening date: June 25, 2004
- Cost: US$40 million
- Replaced: E.T. Adventure (1991–2003)
- Revenge of the Mummy at Universal Studios Hollywood at RCDB

Universal Studios Singapore
- Park section: Ancient Egypt
- Coordinates: 1.255002°N 103.822151°E
- Status: Operating
- Opening date: March 18, 2010
- Cost: US$20 million
- Revenge of the Mummy at Universal Studios Singapore at RCDB

General statistics
- Type: Steel – Launched – Enclosed
- Manufacturer: Premier Rides
- Designer: Universal Creative
- Lift/launch system: Linear induction motors
- Height: 44.4 ft (13.5 m)
- Speed: 40 mph (64 km/h)
- Inversions: 0
- Duration: 2:57
- Max vertical angle: 50°
- Height restriction: 48 in (122 cm)
- Trains: 13 trains with 2 cars; riders arranged 4 across in 2 rows for a total of 16 riders per train
- Universal Express Available
- Single rider line available
- Must transfer from wheelchair
- Closed captioning available

Revenge of the Mummy, officially named Revenge of the Mummy: The Ride, is an enclosed roller coaster located at Universal Studios Florida, Universal Studios Hollywood, and Universal Studios Singapore. It is themed to The Mummy film franchise, and the ride features linear induction motors (LIMs) that launch riders to a maximum speed of 40 mph (64 km/h) in a matter of seconds. The Florida and Singapore locations have the same track layout, although each location offers a slightly different virtual experience. Manufactured by Premier Rides, the attractions feature track switches installed by Dynamic Structures. Universal Creative and ITEC Entertainment Corporation created the theme at each location, with Adirondack Studios responsible for several of the unique elements implemented at the Singapore location.

== History ==
In 2002, Universal Parks & Resorts began planning the design of a dark ride based on the popular Mummy movie franchise. For construction to begin, Universal Studios Florida closed Kongfrontation on September 8, 2002, and Universal Studios Hollywood closed E.T. Adventure on March 14, 2003. On May 21, 2004, Revenge of the Mummy opened at Universal Studios Florida. The installation at Universal Studios Hollywood opened a month later on June 25, 2004.

In December 2008, Resorts World Sentosa, which now encompasses Universal Studios Singapore, announced a Revenge of the Mummy ride would be built at the park, due to open in 2010. In contrast to the previous two installations, the one at Universal Studios Singapore was cheaper, reportedly costing only US$20 million instead of US$40 million. The ride officially opened on March 18, 2010.

== Cast ==
- Brendan Fraser as Himself/Rick O'Connell
- Arnold Vosloo as Imhotep
- Michael Lawson as Reggie
- Rachel Weisz as Evelyn O'Connell
- The Rock as The Scorpion King
- Robert Steinman Elden as John Shippman
- Stephen Sommers as Himself
- Zelda Rubinstein as Herself
- Erick Avari as Dr. Terence Bay (In Singapore)

== Universal Studios Florida ==
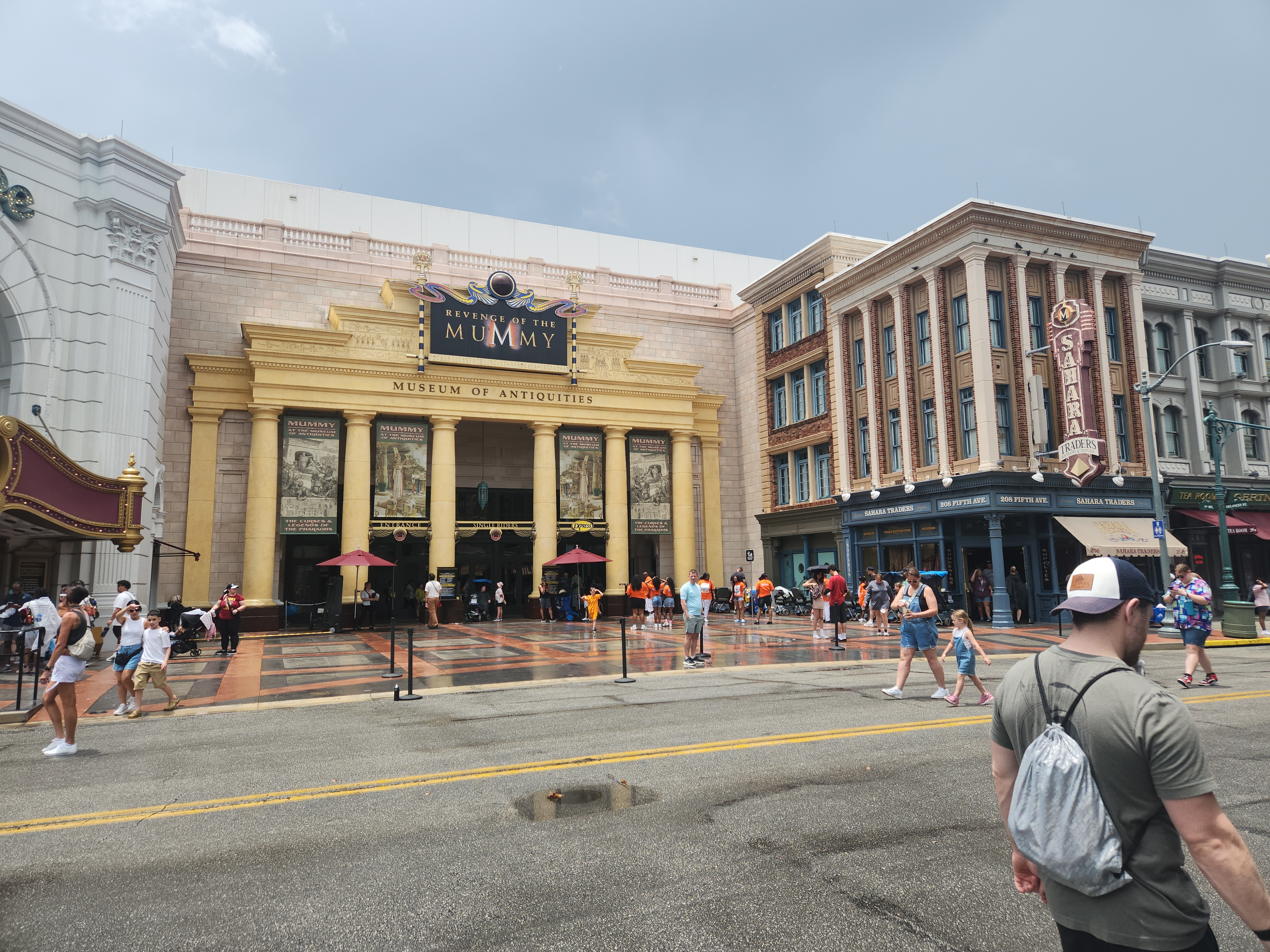
Revenge of the Mummy's entrance at Universal Studios Florida, June 2025.

Revenge of the Mummy opened at Universal Studios Florida on May 21, 2004. Linear induction motor (LIM) technology is used to move trains through various dark ride scenes. It features three separate LIM launches throughout the course of the three-minute ride, including one that propels riders up to a maximum speed of 40 mph (64 km/h). The track is 2,200-foot (670 m) long consisting of five track switches, including a 180 degree turntable, 80-degree banked turns, and a 50-degree angle of descent. Guests exit through a Mummy-themed gift shop titled "Sahara Traders", where they can also purchase a photo of themselves taken during the ride.

The six-story, 62,000-square-foot (5,800 m^{2}) building housing the roller coaster was previously home to one of Universal's landmark attractions, Kongfrontation. Homages to the Kong attraction can be found in several areas within Revenge of the Mummy, including a golden statue of King Kong in the second scene of the ride and props in "Sahara Traders" placing Carl Denham in the role of the Museum of Antiquities curator wanting to put Imhotep the Living Mummy on display as the "Ninth Wonder of the World". The building was constructed of slabs, which at the time, were the largest of their kind ever used. Track pieces from Kongfrontation were built into the building during construction and parts of the track still remain within the building. In order to compensate for space, part of the building was excavated several feet deep for the ride's climactic drop.

=== Queue and pre-show ===
Guests enter the ride through a towering Museum of Antiquities facade, browsing through the film setup of a fictional sequel titled Revenge of the Mummy. Some of the film's props, molds, and concept drawings are on display inside. A pre-ride video plays in the outer line queue explaining how the original Mummy film was made, emphasizing the film's fictional curse that was seemingly proven to be real while filming, with various accidents and plagues striking the cast and crew. Brendan Fraser remains skeptical, however, and refuses to wear the medjai symbol that the crew and locals are convinced will protect them from the curse. Fraser steals crew member Reggie's medjai necklace and demands a coffee – he was previously denied for not wearing the medjai symbol. The inside queue morphs into a 1940s archaeological dig inside an Egyptian tomb, leading to a set of stairs that guests climb to the second floor to board the ride.

=== Summary ===
As the ride begins, the mine carts move into another room inside Imhotep's tomb, where Reggie (a "Revenge of the Mummy" crew member depicted earlier) suddenly appears partially mummified and warns riders: "Are you insane?! Get out of here! The curse is real; this whole place is a trap! He's after your souls!" Before Reggie can finish, Imhotep comes out of a sarcophagus, prompting Reggie to desperately instruct the riders, "Look for the medjai symbol. It's your only hope!", but Imhotep cuts him off shouting "Silence!", sucking out Reggie's soul. He reminds riders, "With your souls, I shall rule for all eternity!"

The train moves into a second room and comes to a stop. Imhotep appears from the sand by a tomb mural directly in front of riders and ominously states, "Serve me and savor riches beyond measure". Light appears across the room, illuminating treasure on both sides of riders. Imhotep sternly continues, "or refuse, and savor a more bitter treasure." Armed soldier mummies suddenly appear guarding the treasure as he utters an Egyptian curse: "Akudei makrraken ra!" ("Destroy them!" in the Ancient Egyptian language). The train then quickly moves into another room and stops abruptly at a wall. Digitally-projected scarab beetles begin to pour out and cover the wall with screeching sound effects, which is quickly followed by the train launching backward, dropping into another room where it stops again.

Imhotep reappears digitally-projected on a screen above the riders moving with the train as it rotates 180 degrees. Imhotep warns: "Not even the medjai can save you now. There is no escape. Your end shall be my beginning! Behold your fate. Will this be your destiny?" The train accelerates through the LIM launch catapulting riders up to 40 mph (64 km/h) while Imhotep shouts, "Your souls are mine!" Then, two bone-warrior props wielding swords props drop on the both sides before launching passengers 40 mph (64 km/h) forward. The train shoots through a digital projection of Imhotep's mouth that is projected onto a fog display, followed by a series of drops, twists, and turns, while speeding past other digital projections of mummies and fire.

The car comes to a stop in a loading station, seemingly indicating the end of the ride. A shadowy female ride attendant appears behind a glassed control booth and begins to thank riders, but Imhotep appears, devouring her soul as the glass breaks sending water droplets onto riders. He shouts "Prepare to forfeit your souls!" and laughs as the ceiling is engulfed in fire. He continues shouting, "Death is only the beginning!" The train enters the last launch, dropping down 39 feet (12 m) – the longest drop in the ride – and speeding along a winding course. A medjai symbol appears, and as the train passes through, Imhotep can be heard screaming "NO!"

Riders pass through a final tunnel of flickering lights and encounter a screen, where a video with Brendan Fraser (dressed as Rick O'Connell) tells riders, "Hey, welcome back! Hope you enjoyed yourself. I would have enjoyed this interview a lot more if I had gotten my cup of coffee!", yelling toward the end of his statement. A cape passes over the screen, and then Imhotep's arm can be seen handing Fraser a cup of coffee. His facial expression turns to panic and horror, and he falls back in his chair screaming as the screen fades to black. The sound of Imhotep roaring over Fraser's screams is heard as the train returns to the station.

== Universal Studios Hollywood ==
Revenge of the Mummy opened at Universal Studios Hollywood on June 25, 2004. The roller coaster has a height restriction of 48 inches. Revenge of the Mummy uses linear induction motors (LIM), a technology used to launch riders. The roller coaster lasts approximately 2 minutes and is housed in the building of the former attraction, the E.T. Adventure.

The ride features warrior mummies, treasures and tombs, a sudden launch, a scarab beetle attack, forwards and backwards motion and surround sound speakers inside the vehicles. Hollywood's coaster was built in the former E.T. Adventure building. Some support beams for the coaster were built by digging downward to accommodate space. Actual props from the film series such as some warrior mummies, treasures, and The Book of the Dead, can be found in this incarnation.

=== Queue and pre-show ===
Set in 1944, the queue provides riders with a brief backstory of Imhotep and the ride in general. Once guests enter the building's corridor in to the ride, they first see a hole which air will blast out of every 10 to 15 seconds (there are further traps along the corridor). When guest move further in, the Book of the Dead is seen. A peep hole is also seen, fenced up by wires, containing a mummified man in his sarcophagus and other mummified remains of people whom Imhotep may have sucked their souls out earlier. The man's mummy is surrounded by carnivorous scarab beetles. When guests move deeper into the building (now appearing to be a tomb), they find an abandoned archaeological dig which is actually Imhotep's burial chamber. Looking up ahead in a giant mirror is a pictogram of Imhotep grinning at the guest followed by another pictogram of the guest being chased by Imhotep's army of mummy soldiers. Further in, riders find an archaeological dig set in a backdrop of 1944. The queue ends in an Ancient Egyptian themed loading platform, complete with hieroglyphs and a large statue of a scarab beetle, in which the riders board mine cart-type coasters.

=== Summary ===
As the ride begins, riders enter a dark tomb lit with dark green and red fluorescent lights, with a mummy coming to life to the left and hissing at riders. From above, Omid Djalili's character the Warden Gad Hassan, from The Mummy film (who was thought to have met his fate in the first film), warns guests "Run for your lives! The curse is real! Imhotep lives!" He screams as scarab beetles engulf him. The mine car continues through to a dark chamber, as drops of water fall on guests, and mummies stretch their arms out from each side of the cart while mummified arms appear from the ceiling, trying to grab riders.

The mine car slowly continues into the treasure room, filled with large amounts of golden yellow light, Egyptian hieroglyphs covering the walls, and two gigantic statues of Anubis stationed next to a projector screen, where Imhotep appears from sand in a mural and tells guests, "Serve me and savor the riches of eternal life." The mine car makes a sharp turn as the yellow room quickly turns a dark shade of green, Imhotep continues his monologue... "And join us in eternal death." The mine car moves into the grand gallery as an animatronic Imhotep continues to speak a curse in Egyptian language "Akum ra, akum de," before exclaiming "Now your souls belong to me... forever!" At the same time, the grand gallery starts to collapse after Imohtep used the powerful curse from the Scroll of Osiris. A wall behind him collapses, forming an eclipse as four more mummy warriors drop down from each side of the track, holding cutlasses in their hands.

The car is then launched at a high speed into darkness as the ride photo is taken. The surround sound speakers in the mine cart provide riders with an added dimension of entertainment, as the sound score begins. The ride continues for 56 seconds in darkness, going around high banked turns and small drops. Various images of mummy warriors and Imhotep are illuminated with ultraviolet lighting as the car twists and turns. The mine car makes a sharp uphill movement and veers left, where the track viciously brakes in a corner. The second launch is located in this area. Scarab beetles appear on the walls in front of the car with help of projectors, as the added special effects of air jets at riders' feet and a spray of water from above create the illusion of the vehicle being overrun by the bugs. As a screaming sound effect is heard, the car launches backwards into the underworld as Imhotep's laugh plays on the soundtrack. The vehicle makes a few more twists and turns, while more images of Imhotep and the mummy warriors are lit up as it continues backwards and Imhotep reminds riders "There's no place to hide! Your souls are mine!"

The car slows suddenly under the last illuminated painting of Imhotep's outstretched grasp and moves slowly into another room. A turntable moves the car into a forward-facing position as fog machines and strobe lighting fill the blackened room. As the car faces forward once again, Imhotep appears as a projected image and screams "No!" at riders before vanishing. There is a second of uncertain silence before a floodlight hits riders, and as a wall lifts up into the ceiling to allow the car to pass through, a second strobe light blinds guests. The ride enters the loading platform.

=== Modifications ===
Originally, the ride featured faux-fire and projection effects during the final encounter with Imhotep, engulfing the ride vehicle in pressurized steam and specialized lighting. The ride now uses strobe effects, with a brief pause before the false wall rises on the loading platform.

== Universal Studios Singapore ==
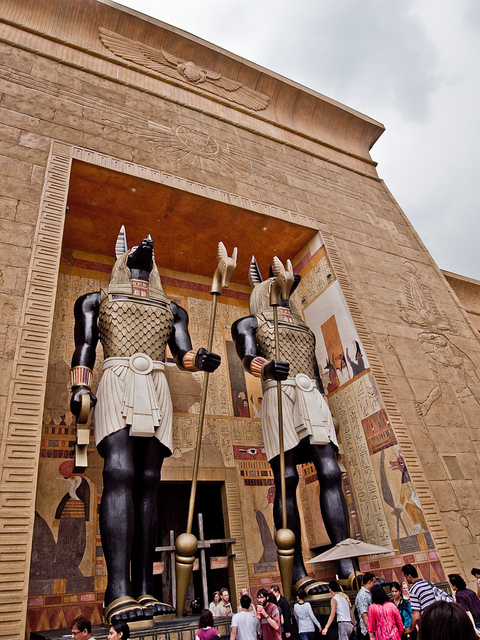
Revenge of the Mummy's entrance at Universal Studios Singapore.

Revenge of the Mummy opened at Universal Studios Singapore on March 18, 2010, with the soft opening of the park. This Revenge of the Mummy roller coaster is nearly identical and almost follows Universal Studios Florida version with differences aside from exchanging the medjai medallion for Book Of The Living. However, the Singapore version includes a different storyline with new sounds and effects, as well as a new ending featuring Imhotep being sealed inside his tomb. The ride's new theming was designed by Adirondack Studios, ITEC Entertainment Corp and Universal Creative.

=== Queue and pre-show ===
Unlike the Orlando version of the ride, guests enter an Egyptian tomb directly. Props from the Mummy film franchise and wall paintings of Imhotep's life as a high priest are featured in the inner queue areas similar to the Orlando version of the ride. When you are about to walk up the staircase, a sign that fades in and tells riders 'Find the gold Book of the Living, Destroy Imhotep's Curse'. At the loading station, guests board mine cars utilizing individual lap bars.

=== Summary ===
As the ride begins with mine cars move deeper into the tomb. The words "Find the Book" are scrawled over the walls. As the mine car turns, riders see Evelyn's supervisor trapped on a table. Standing next to him, while holding the Book of the Dead, is Imhotep, who allows the supervisor to say his final words before he can suck his soul. For his final words, the supervisor instructs the riders, "Find the Book of the Living and kill Imhotep! It's your only hope!". With that done, Imhotep shouts "Silence!" and sucks his soul. He then turns to the riders, warning them "You will never find the book—your souls will be mine for all eternity." Outlines of the Book of the Living, on the walls at the left, glow in red. Almost identical to the Orlando version, the vehicle move into a room with treasure all over. Imhotep appears from the sand in a tomb mural tempts riders, "Serve me and savor riches beyond measure". Light appears across the room, revealing treasure around the room. Imhotep also states, "or refuse, and savor a more bitter treasure." Soldier mummies appear in front of the treasure as he utters an Egyptian curse "Akudei makrraken ra!!" ("Destroy them!" in the Ancient Egyptian language), prompting balls of fire to erupt from the ceremonial braziers flanking the mural. The vehicle then quickly moves into another room and halts into a sudden stop, nearly "crashing" into a wall, causing scarab beetles to "burst out" from the walls in. Then the vehicle drops backwards and turns with an anti-clockwise 180-degree circle as the screaming sound effect is heard and Imhotep warns the riders: "You will never find the book. There is no escape. Your end shall be my beginning. Behold your fate!" Then the ride catapults guests to 40 mph while Imhotep shouts: "YOUR SOULS ARE MINE!" At this instant, riders are accelerated from 0 to 40 miles per hour (64 km/h) in a matter of seconds. The vehicle accelerates up a hill as it goes through Imhotep's skull and drops through various turns past projections of mummies.

The vehicle comes to a stop after this, and riders will find the Book of the Living on a pedestal. Imhotep's voice is heard saying, "Without this book, you will never stop me!" and he suddenly jumps out from behind the book saying "Prepare to forfeit your souls!". (However, this effect is permanently broken.) The ceiling of the room is engulfed in flames as Imhotep threatens the riders once again opening the book shouting "NOOOOO!" and causing the inscriptions to glow red. The vehicle moves forward and drops down "into hell" (the camera is located here) and goes down a winding drop before the brake run. Further on, riders "pass through" a wall and will see a sarcophagus hanging from the ceiling with Imhotep trapped inside. As the eyes of his Sarcophagus glow red, he shouts that the riders can never be defeated and taunts the riders with a warning, "Hopeless fools! You can never defeat me, I will escape this little tomb. Death is only the beginning!", followed by an evil laugh as the riders move on to the unload platform. (The final voiceline has three different variations, but they all end with "Death is only the beginning.")

== Comparison ==
Statistic	Universal Studios Florida	Universal Studios Hollywood	Universal Studios Singapore
Opened	May 21, 2004	June 25, 2004	March 18, 2010
Length	2,200 feet or 670 metres	1,906 feet or 581 metres	2,200 feet or 670 metres
Speed	40 mph or 64 km/h	40 mph or 64 km/h	40 mph or 64 km/h
Duration	2:57	2:00	2:57
Cost	US$40 million	US$40 million	US$20 million

== Awards ==
Golden Ticket Awards: Best Indoor Coaster
Year	2004	2007	2011	2013	2015	2016	2017	2018	2019
Ranking	5	2 (tie)	1	1	1	1	1	1	1

Due to consistent 1st place awards, the best indoor roller coaster category has been retired and the ride has been given legendary status by the Golden Ticket Awards.

== Incidents ==
- On September 21, 2004, a 39-year-old man fell approximately 4 feet (1.2 m) from the ride's loading platform onto the tracks below while boarding the front row. He died the following morning during an operation to remove his spleen. The death was ruled accidental by the local medical examiner's office.
- On September 23, 2004, a 67-year-old woman was injured when her arm became stuck between a handrail. The ride was temporarily shut down following an investigation and continued to resume normal operational hours after it was deemed safe.
- On November 18, 2007, a woman broke a vertebra in her lower back while riding the attraction.

== See also ==
- Flight of Fear, a similar ride at two Six Flags parks.
