= Steve Banning (The Mummy) =

Fictional character from 1940s and 1950s Mummy movies

- The Mummy character
- First appearance: The Mummy's Hand
- Last appearance: The Mummy's Tomb
- Created by: Christy Cabanne
- Portrayed by: Dick Foran; Felix Aylmer

In-universe information
- Full name: Stephen Banning
- Gender: Male
- Occupation: Archaeologist; Treasure hunter
- Affiliation: Scripps Museum
- Spouse: Marta Solvani/Sullivan (deceased)
- Relatives: John Banning (son); Isobel Evans/Banning (daughter-in-law); Jane Banning (sister, deceased); Solvani/Tim Sullivan (father-in-law, deceased); Ella Evans (sister-in-law)
- Nationality: American
- Origin: Mapleton, Massachusetts
- Status: Deceased
- Date of death: 1942

Steve Banning is a fictional character from The Mummy franchise who appeared in the films The Mummy's Hand (1940), The Mummy's Tomb (1942) and The Mummy (1959).

In the Universal series, Banning is portrayed by Dick Foran and is an archaeologist and treasure hunter who goes to Egypt to search for Princess Ananka's tomb and gets attacked by Kharis whom he defeats, but the mummy returns to kill him one more time.

In the Hammer series, he is portrayed by Felix Aylmer and is also an archaeologist who searches for Ananka's tomb but has to now face off against the newly revived Kharis.

== Universal Pictures series ==
=== Early life ===
Stephen "Steve" Banning was born on June 18, 1882 in the small town of Mapleton, Massachusetts where he grew up with his older sister Jane. In his youth, he became an archaeologist and went on many famous expeditions for the Scripps Museum who then tasked him to go to Egypt.

=== The Mummy's Hand ===
In 1912 at a town market in Cairo, Egypt, Steve finds a vase which had Princess Ananka's tomb written on it, and purchases it. Meanwhile, his best friend Babe Jenson bought an Egyptian lucky charm doll for himself. The two then take it to the local Cairo Museum where archaeologist Dr. Charles Petrie decides to join and create an expedition to the Hill of the Seven Jackals to search for Ananka's tomb. Steve and Babe also meet archaeologist and secret high priest Professor Andoheb who says that the vase was a total fake and breaks it purposefully but makes it accidental, saying that they wasted the money whilst also creating an enemy in Steve. Dr. Petrie still decides to create and join the expedition with the two whilst Andoheb meets with his agent Cairo Beggar who decides to assassinate the two for going to Ananka's tomb.

After that, Steve tries to find another member of the expedition who will pay the money to fund it and join them, but he finds no luck as everybody he talks to with refuses to join the expedition or even pay money to fund it. Disappointed, he and Babe go to the hotel bar where Babe decides to play magic games with a man, who is revealed to be famous magician Solvani who easily tricks him. After that, the three have a discussion at the restaurant table where Steve and Babe tell Solvani about the expedition. Solvani agrees to fund it, and joins to the expedition whilst also revealing his real name to be Tim Sullivan from Brooklyn. Their conversation is cut short by Andoheb's agents led by the Beggar who attacks them but Steve, Babe and Solvani manage to fight them and later escape the restaurant to their respective hotels. Later that night, while Steve is going to bed, Babe opens the door and comes Marta Sullivan/Solvani, the daughter of Solvani who points a gun at Babe because she thought that he and Steve robbed her and her father. Marta is then ready to shoot Babe until Steve takes the gun away from her from behind, hearing everything and introduces himself to her which makes her tell him and Babe that her and her father have no money now, that he gave their last few dollars to fund the expedition and tells them that she is going to join it along with her father to see if it is an actual expedition. Steve tells her that the Cairo and Scripps Museum funded it before she leaves the room with Babe then telling Steve that now they have a "dame" in their expedition.

A few days later, Steve, Babe, Marta, Solvani and Dr. Petrie embark on the expedition to the Hill of the Seven Jackals where they meet their Egyptian guide Ali and their Egyptian companions. During the search, Babe accidentally blows up a few rocks using a dynamite which opens a secret cave there. The Egyptians refuse to go in, saying that it is cursed and run away from the expedition along with Ali, leaving the Americans to go inside the cave, watched upwards by Andoheb and the Cairo Beggar. They go into the cave and instead find the tombed coffin of Kharis lying inside, shocking them and scaring Marta because of the hideous way he looks. That night, Steve, Babe and Dr. Petrie examine Kharis with the latter adding that he is an example of a mummified Egyptian former high priest whilst Steve examines and explains the marks on his wrappings before leaving with Babe and outside, reuniting with Ali. Before they could talk further, a scream comes from inside the cave causing them to run inside and find the dead body of Petrie along with noticing Kharis not being on the operating table anymore, concluding that he strangled Petrie to death and escaped.

At midnight, Marta and Steve examine the broken vase one more time and see what it actually means and where Ananka's tomb could be located, but soon Babe explains that they had searched everywhere and failed to find any evidence of the tomb, leaving it behind. As midnight is still not over, Steve, Babe, Tim Sullivan and Marta are hanging outside their tents, asking each other what to do about the news they had got until they hear a scream from Marta and Solvani's tent. They go inside and see the dead body of Ali, with the same strangle marks as Dr. Petrie, realising that the now revived mummy of Kharis was killing off the expedition members. Steve still decides to search for Ananka's tomb with Babe and tells Marta to sleep in his tent tonight and go home with her father tomorrow in the morning and that he will return in a few days after finding the tomb. As the night passes, Steve and Babe are on the lookout for a mummy until the two hear a sound from the tent and go inside to see Marta gone and Solvani injured and strangled, telling them that a mysterious intruder in bandages strangled him and took Marta to the caves. Hearing this Steve and Babe start to rush over there to rescue Marta, noticing Kharis carrying her to the caves.

During the journey, they are attacked by but kill the Cairo Beggar who tries to assassinate them before splitting up to go to different areas. Steve runs into the cave and passes through its many rooms before finally arriving at the main lair where he sees Marta tied up, causing him to attack Kharis who easily beats him twice. Marta tells him how to defeat the mummy before Babe then comes suddenly and shoots the container containing the tana leaves. Kharis tries to get the leaves, but Steve grabs the container with fire and whack Kharis on the head with it, knocking out and burning the mummy to death before he then reunites with Marta and Babe. A few days later, Steve, Marta, Babe and Mr. Solvani are at the Cairo Bazaar where Steve gives back the now fixed vase to the shopkeeper. He finds another vase and tries to take it, but Marta jokingly tells him to stop focusing on vases anymore and come with her and the others back to the states, ending with them going back over there carrying the spoils of Ananka's tomb.

=== The Mummy's Tomb ===
After arriving at the states, Steve and Babe reunite with and Marta and Mr. Solvani meet Jane Banning. Also, during this time, Steve becomes rich and lives as a famous and wealthy archaeologist with Marta as his wife and Mr. Solvani as his father-in-law. Steve and Marta also have a son John Banning during this time. One day, Marta accidentally passes away from an unknown sickness and so does Mr. Solvani.

Thirty years later in 1942 in his Mapleton Mansion, Steve, Jane, John, John's fiancé Isobel Evans and Isobel's mother Ella Evans are talking at Steve's Mapleton mansion and house about the events in Egypt 30 years ago.

A few days later, Steve, Isobel, Jane and John are at the mansion playing a board game when they hear a sound outside. John goes outside to see who is it with Steve's servant and dog handler Jim whilst Steve goes to sleep upstairs in his room, but from the dark, Kharis the mummy appears in front of Steve and strangles him to death. His body is found by the others soon and a funeral in Mapleton is made for him in which Babe visits.

== Hammer Productions ==
Steve Banning
- The Mummy character
- First appearance: The Mummy
- Last appearance: The Mummy
- Created by: Terence Fisher
- Portrayed by: Felix Aylmer

In-universe information
- Gender: Male
- Occupation: Archaeologist
- Relatives: John Banning (son); Isobel Evans/Banning (daughter-in-law); Joseph Whemple (brother)
- Nationality: British
- Origin: London, UK
- Status: Deceased
- Date of death: 1898

=== Early life ===
Stephen "Steve" Banning was born on February 21, 1825, in London, UK, where he grew up with his family and cousin brother Joseph Whemple. As a young man, he married an unnamed woman, became an archaeologist and went on many expeditions with Joseph. On May 21, 1862, his wife give birth to a son named John, who would also become an archaeologist and go on many expeditions with him.

=== The Mummy (1959) ===
In 1895, Steve, John and Joseph go to Cairo, Egypt for an expedition to Princess Ananka's tomb. During the expedition, John gets a leg injury and has to limp which causes Steve and Joseph to leave him at the tent and go to the tomb themselves. When they arrive there, Steve finds the Scroll of Thoth and reads it out aloud, causing the mummy Kharis to awaken from his sleep and walk away. Steve, after seeing Kharis, becomes hysterical and starts laughing madly. Joseph sees him and after finding the tombs and going back to the UK, he and John put Steve in a psych ward. John visits him for the next few months alongside his wife Isobel Banning. Steve also goes in a catatonic state during this time.

Three years later in 1898, John visits Steve one day at the psych ward where Steve suddenly snaps out and tells John the story of Kharis and Ananka and warns him that the mummy of Kharis is going to come after them. John disbelieves this at first but later finds out that he was telling the truth. One night, Steve is sleeping in his room until suddenly Kharis bursts through his windows and after a chase, corners and strangles him to death.

== Character influence ==
Dick Foran's character of Steve Banning as an adventurous archeologist fascinated with ancient artifacts served as partial inspiration for the later creation of Indiana Jones.

The characeter also inspired the character of Rick O'Connell in The Mummy film series from 1999 to 2008, portrayed by Brendan Fraser.

== Other appearances ==
Universal Pictures released a comic in The Monsters of Filmland magazine which was a comic book adaptation of The Mummy's Hand and featured Banning made to look like Foran's character whilst Hammer Publishing also released a comic book adaptation of The Mummy with Banning made to look like Aylmer's character.

== See also ==
- Rick O'Connell
- Indiana Jones
