= The Mummy's Tomb =

1942 film by Harold Young

- Directed by: Harold Young
- Screenplay by: Griffin Jay; Henry Sucher
- Story by: Neil P. Varnick
- Starring: Lon Chaney Jr.; Dick Foran; John Hubbard; Elyse Knox; Wallace Ford; Turhan Bey
- Cinematography: George Robinson
- Edited by: Milton Carruth
- Production company: Universal Pictures Company
- Distributed by: Universal Pictures Company
- Release date: 23 October 1942
- Running time: 60 minutes
- Country: United States
- Language: English

The Mummy's Tomb is a 1942 American horror film directed by Harold Young and starring Lon Chaney Jr. as Kharis the mummy. Taking place 30 years after the events of The Mummy's Hand, where Andoheb (George Zucco) has survived and plans revenge on Stephen Banning (Dick Foran) and his entire family in Mapleton, Massachusetts. With the help of Andoheb and the mummy Kharis, the high priest Mehemet Bey (Turhan Bey) takes a job as a caretaker of a graveyard. At the first full moon, the mummy is fed tanna leaves which allow him to break into the Banning residence and kill the now elderly Stephen. Stephen's son then seeks assistance from Babe Hanson (Wallace Ford), one of the members of the original Banning expedition to Egypt to stop Andoheb and Kharis.

Lon Chaney Jr. had renewed his contract with Universal Pictures in 1942 and had his first role as the mummy Kharis in The Mummy's Tomb, a role he would reprise in the film's sequels The Mummy's Ghost and The Mummy's Curse. The film was shot between June 1 through mid-June 1942, not including footage taken from the previous film in the series The Mummy's Hand as well as Frankenstein.

== Plot ==
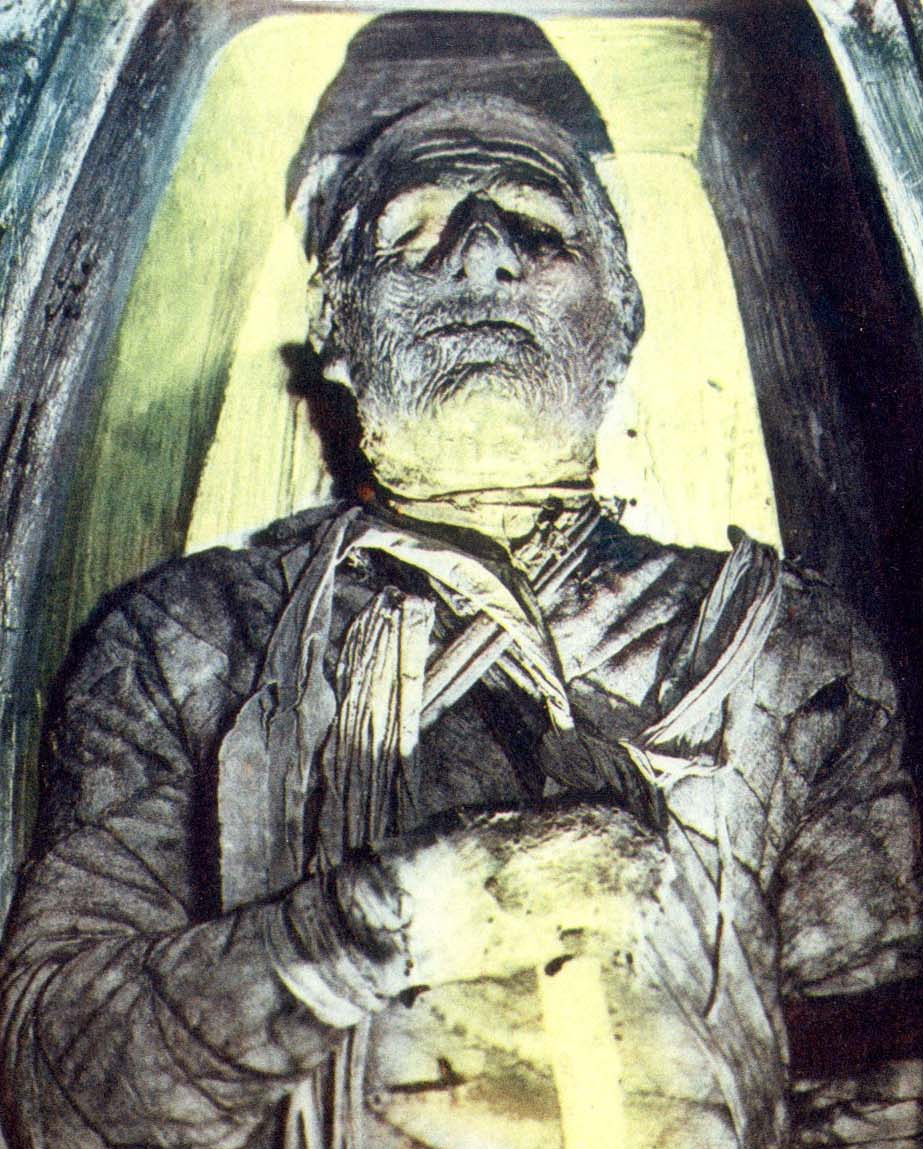
Lon Chaney Jr. as Kharis

Thirty years after Massachusetts archaeologist Steve Banning discovered the tomb of Princess Ananka following a showdown with the living mummy of Ananka's former lover Kharis, Kharis's High Priest guardian Andoheb explains the legend of Kharis to his follower, Mehemet Bey. After passing on the instructions for the use of the tana leaves, and assigning the task of terminating the remaining members of the Banning expedition and their descendants, Andoheb expires. Bey and Kharis leave Egypt for the United States.

Bey takes the caretaker's job at the Mapleton cemetery, sets up shop, and administers the tana brew to Kharis. The monster sets out to avenge the desecration of Ananka's tomb. The creature kills Banning as he prepares for bed. As the sheriff and coroner cannot come up with a lead to the killer, newspapermen converge on Mapleton to learn more about the story. Babe Hanson arrives on the scene after learning of his friend's death. When Jane Banning, Steve's sister, is killed, Hanson is convinced it is the work of a mummy. Meeting with the sheriff and coroner, Hanson is unable to convince them of the identity of the culprit. He tells his story to a newspaperman at the local bar, but, after a chase and struggle, is dispatched by Kharis. Dr. John Banning, the son of Stephen Banning, enlists the help of Professor Norman to solve the puzzle of the "grayish mark" found on the victims' throats. Norman's test results prove that Hanson was right: the substance was mold from a mummy.

Knowing that Banning and his girlfriend, Isobel Evans are planning to marry, Bey sets out to disrupt their nuptials. Bey has become smitten with Isobel, and sends Kharis to bring her to him. Kharis initially balks but, in the dark of the night, stealthily enters the Evans's home and abducts Isobel to the cemetery caretaker's hut. Bey tells Isobel that she is to become his bride, as a "High Priest of Karnak", and bear him an heir to the royal line. Banning and the rest of the townspeople have become convinced that their recent Egyptian immigrant may be involved in the crimes. Arriving in force, they confront Bey outside the hut. Kharis slips away with Isobel, and Bey attempts to shoot Banning, but is gunned down by the sheriff. The creature is observed heading toward the Banning estate, and the group pursues, many bearing torches. Inside the home, Banning holds Kharis at bay with a torch while he rescues Isobel, but inadvertently sets fire to some curtains. With the aid of the sheriff and coroner, John and Isobel escape via a trellis as Kharis pursues them out onto the upstairs balcony. The townspeople keep the mummy from similarly escaping by hurling additional torches at him, and the monster perishes in the flames of the thoroughly consumed house. Banning and Isobel wed in short order, as he has received his draft notice and is due to report for his tour of duty in World War II.

== Cast ==
Cast adapted from the book Universal Horrors:

- Lon Chaney Jr. as Kharis
- Dick Foran as Steve Banning
- John Hubbard as Dr. John Banning
- Elyse Knox as Isobel Evans
- Wallace Ford as Babe Hanson
- Turhan Bey as Mehemet Bey
- George Zucco as High Priest Andoheb
- Mary Gordon as Jane Banning
- Cliff Clark as Sheriff
- Virginia Brissac as Ella Evans
- Paul E. Burns as Jim
- Frank Reicher as Prof. Matthew Norman
- Emmett Vogan as Coroner
- Harry Cording as Vic
- Frank Darien as Old Man
- Glenn Strange as Farmer

== Production ==
The Mummy's Tomb director was a former film editor who worked in England in the 1930s working with people like Alexander Korda films like The Scarlet Pimpernel. His subsequent work in Hollywood as a director predominantly consisted of b-films including The Mummy's Tomb. The onscreen credits and contemporary reviews list George Robinson as the director of photography, early Hollywood Reporter production charts credit Harry Neuman. Lon Chaney Jr. renewed his contract with Universal Pictures in February 1942 and made his first appearance as the Mummy in The Mummy's Tomb, a role he would reprise in two Universal films: The Mummy's Curse and The Mummy's Ghost. Recent naturalized United States citizen Wallace Ford reprised his role as Babe Hanson.

Production on the film began on June 1 and ended in mid-June 1942. Parts of the film use elements from previous Universal Pictures movies. This includes footage from The Mummy's Hand, Frankenstein, Bride of Frankenstein and The Ghost of Frankenstein with the film's music score containing portions of music written for The Invisible Woman. It also reuses the Shelby House on Universal's backlot originally for the film Uncle Tom's Cabin (1927) for the Banning residence. The 2023 BearManor Media book "The Mummy's Tomb" by Tom Weaver et al. provides the full story of the making of the movie, plus script, pressbook and other extras.

== Release ==
The Mummy's Tomb was distributed by the Universal Pictures Company and released on October 23, 1942. The film was a double feature with Night Monster.

== Reception ==
From contemporary reviews, Harrison's Reports stated that "much happens, but nothing that will surprise the horror fans", while Theodore Strauss of The New York Times proclaimed "no wonder the Mummy lasted for 3,000 years. In that tandem fashion, he may go on for another 30,000 – heaven forbid!"

From retrospective reviews, the authors of the book Universal Horrors stated that The Mummy's Tomb was a weaker film for Chaney, noting that "the care and talent that was lavished upon The Wolf Man is sorely lacking in The Mummy's Tomb" and that the film "gets by as entertainment for hardcore Universal enthusiasts by its cozy familiarity alone", concluding that The Mummy's Hand was superior proclaiming that the film is "so perfunctory, so small scale in ambition and execution, it seemed destined for the bottom-of-the-bill slot". Hans J. Wollstein of AllMovie awarded the film two stars out of five, stating that the film "is neither the best nor the worst in Universal's second wave of horror films", finding that "when all is said and done there is only so much that a monster swathed in bandages can do", concluding that the film "is fairly entertaining fare and it is fun to see the angry villagers from the original Frankenstein back in action via stock footage".

James Lowder reviewed The Mummy's Tomb in White Wolf Inphobia #53 (March, 1995), rating it a 2 out of 5 and stated that "the two-week shooting schedule and bargain basement effects helped make The Mummy's Tomb Universal's most profitable film of the year for 1942."

Actor Turhan Bey admitted that he had not seen The Mummy's Tomb; he would later state it among his favorite screen roles: "I guess it's my favorite because it was a part closest to my own nationality – it was a young Egyptian who believed in something which we couldn't comprehend with our five senses.... If I could have picked my roles, I would have played these kinds of heavies, people who have a mental quirk or who for some reason or another, are acting against the positive side of the plot of the picture".
