= Imhotep (The Mummy) =

Character and the titular antagonist in the 1932 film "The Mummy"

- The Mummy character
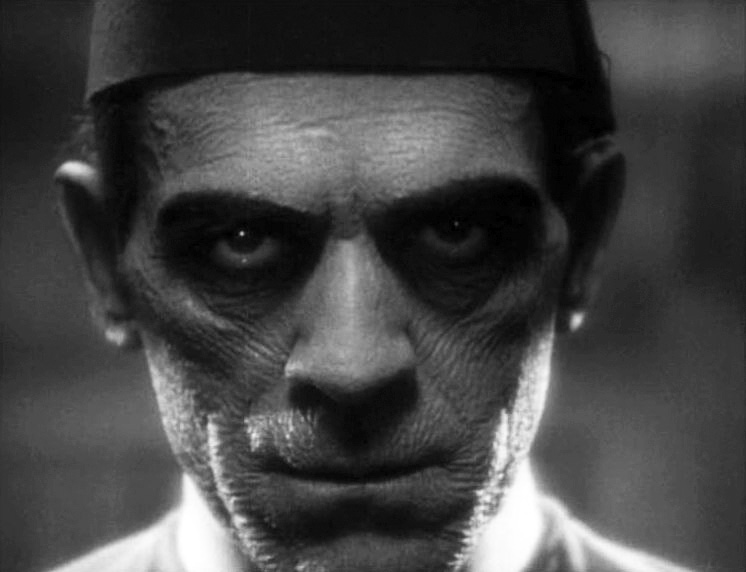
- Boris Karloff as Imhotep in The Mummy (1932)
- First appearance: The Mummy (1932)
- Last appearance: The Mummy (2001–2003)
- Portrayed by: Boris Karloff (1932); Arnold Vosloo (1999–2001)
- Voiced by: Jim Cummings (2001–2003)

In-universe information
- Species: Mummy
- Gender: Male
- Occupation: High priest
- Nationality: Egyptian
- Date of birth: 3000 years ago
- Status: Deceased (original); Deceased (remake series); Deceased (animated series)

Imhotep is the main antagonist of the 1932 film The Mummy, its loose 1999 remake, and the remake's 2001 sequel The Mummy Returns. Sofia Boutella plays a female version of the character named Ahmanet in the 2017 reboot. The character is named after the historical figure Imhotep, a noted polymath and counselor to the Pharaoh Djoser in the 27th century BC.

== Appearances ==
=== The Mummy (1932) ===
In his original appearance, Imhotep was portrayed by Boris Karloff as a high priest of ancient Egypt who steals the Scroll of Thoth in an attempt to resurrect his dead lover princess Anck-es-en-Amon. For Imhotep's sacrilege, the princess's father Pharaoh Amenophis the Magnificent orders Imhotep to be tortured, mummified, and buried alive. The Scroll of Thoth is buried with him so that no one would ever again have the chance to use it like he did.

Imhotep is accidentally revived as a mummy when an archaeological expedition discovers his mummy and one of the archaeologists unknowingly reads the Scroll of Thoth's ancient life-giving spell. While reviewing his mummy, the archaeologists note that not only was Imhotep buried alive as indicated by his struggle, but that sacred spells meant to protect his soul on its journey to the underworld were chipped off his coffin so his soul would be condemned in the afterlife.

Imhotep escapes from the archaeologists and ten years later has assumed the identity of Ardath Bey, a modern Egyptian. In this form, he helps a new team of archaeologists find the tomb of Anck-es-en-Amon. When Ardath meets a woman named Helen Grosvenor who bears a striking resemblance to Anck-es-en-Amon, he realizes that she is a reincarnation of the princess and attempts to mummify her and make her his bride.

Imhotep is able to use years of power and strength to control others in person and through a looking pool from afar, causing both attraction to him and death to those he wishes it upon. His powers allow him to control others to take his orders, which gives him control and the ability to draw Helen Grosvenor to him, where she can never remember what she did or why she was with him. Recalling her past life, Grosvenor asks the goddess Isis for help. She causes Imhotep to dissolve into dust by raising her statue's hand and setting the Scroll of Thoth on fire.

The ancient Egyptian priest from the film is named after a famous Egyptian architect named Imhotep who was responsible for designing the pyramid of Djoser at Saqqara. He is also well-known for becoming his own priest and excelling in medicine where he was considered a healer, using plants to treat common diseases. Though the mummy of Imhotep has never been found, an empty sarcophagus was found in a tomb that is thought to have been his. There is, however, a disagreement on if the tomb discovered actually does belong to Imhotep, because there is evidence that whoever was laid to rest in that tomb did not worship Ra.

=== The Mummy (1999) ===
Arnold Vosloo is Imhotep in The Mummy. (1999)

In the 1999 remake, Imhotep is portrayed by Arnold Vosloo and is, once again, the main antagonist of the film. In 1290 BC, Imhotep was the high priest of Osiris under the rule of Pharaoh Seti I. He began an affair with Seti's mistress and future bride Anck-su-namun and they assassinate the Pharaoh when he discovers it. They are discovered and Anck-su-namun commits suicide, intending that Imhotep resurrect her. He and his priests later steal her corpse from her burial place. Imhotep attempts to resurrect Anck-su-namun, but is captured at Hamunaptra (the City of the Dead) by the Medjai (the Pharaoh's sacred bodyguards). His priests are mummified and buried alive. Imhotep, meanwhile, is condemned to endure the Curse of the Hom-Dai: the ritual involves cutting out his tongue, mummifying him alive, and sealing him in a sarcophagus filled with carnivorous scarab beetles. The curse transforms Imhotep into an undead fiend kept in a state of living death, with the intention that he would suffer being eaten alive by the scarabs for all time. If revived, he would gain control over sand and other elements, together with being virtually invincible.

During an archaeological dig in 1926 AD, Imhotep is accidentally revived when librarian and amateur Egyptologist Evelyn "Evy" Carnahan (Rachel Weisz) reads the Book of the Dead at Hamunaptra, where his sarcophagus was. Imhotep regenerates himself using the flesh of four adventurers who breached his burial-chamber and opened a cursed chest, but spares Evelyn because he wants to use her body for the resurrection of his former lover, Anck-su-namun.

Once revived, Imhotep gained several powers, including regeneration, invulnerability, and the ability to turn himself into sand and control the desert sands. He could also wield the ten Plagues of Egypt to an unspecified degree; in the course of the film he is shown turning water to blood, unleashing swarms of locusts, and controlling the people of the city by inflicting them with boils and sores. Early in the film, Imhotep expresses an intense fear of cats, screaming in fear when a white one appears in Evelyn's room: Ardeth Bay (the leader of an ancient secret society devoted to guarding Imhotep's tomb, rather than an alias of Imhotep) and Evelyn's employer explain that Imhotep will fear them until he is fully regenerated, cats being associated with the guardians of the underworld in Egyptian mythology, which is used to drive him back during an early confrontation.

He attempts to resurrect Anck-su-namun again, using Evelyn as a sacrifice. Ultimately, Imhotep is defeated when he is stripped of immortality by the Book of Amun-Ra and he is stabbed with a sword by the film's protagonist Rick O'Connell (Brendan Fraser). As he degenerates into a skeletal form and falls into the pool from which he summoned Anck-su-namun's ba, Imhotep declares the same words he scrawled into his sarcophagus thousands of years before, "Death is only the beginning", vowing that he will return to have his revenge.

=== The Mummy Returns (2001) ===
In the 2001 sequel The Mummy Returns, Imhotep, having been resurrected and freed from the resin he had been trapped in at the end of the first film by a group of cultists and Anck-su-namun's reincarnation, proceeds to seek out the Bracelet of Anubis, which was the key to finding the lair of the Scorpion King, an ancient warrior whose defeat will grant Imhotep control over the Scorpion King's near-indestructible Army of Anubis. After finding the bracelet on the arm of Alex O'Connell, the son of Rick and Evy, Imhotep captures the boy and uses him to find the lair of the Scorpion King, rejuvenating his body using the flesh of mercenaries Anck-su-namun tricks into opening the cursed chest.

Once Imhotep reaches the lair, he walks over a magic seal on the floor which causes him to be robbed of his telekinesis, immortality, and other powers granted by the Curse of Hom-Dai by Anubis, who seemingly wishes him to face the Scorpion King as a normal mortal. When the Scorpion King responds to Imhotep's summons, Imhotep tricks him into attacking Rick O'Connell. When Rick kills the Scorpion King and sends him and his army back to the underworld, the palace begins to collapse.

As the building collapses, Rick and Imhotep both nearly fall into a chasm that seemingly leads to the underworld, grabbing onto the ledge for support. While Rick is rescued by Evelyn, who he calls out to in a desperate plea for her to leave him and save herself, Imhotep begs Anck-su-namun for help, but she selfishly refuses and abandons him to die. Soon after, as apparent karma, she falls into a pit of scorpions and meets her own demise. Following this betrayal, Imhotep loses all will to live, as his only reason for returning from the grave was to be reunited with his lover, who did not fully reciprocate his affection. He gives Rick and Evelyn a sad smile, recognizing the genuineness of their love, and willingly casts himself into the pit, thus ending his reign of terror again.

=== The Mummy TV series (2001–2003) ===
In the animated television series simply titled The Mummy, based on the 1999 and 2001 films, he is voiced by Jim Cummings and is again the main antagonist. Unlike the films, he is able to speak modern English in this series. Many years ago, Imhotep was the high priest of Osiris who wanted to rule the world. He was already the keeper of the Scrolls of Thebes. When he was about to steal the Manacle of Osiris, the Pharaoh sent his royal guards to intercept him and sentence him to be mummified alive. Years later, Imhotep was resurrected by Colin Weasler, despite his co-worker Evy's attempt to destroy him. He plots to seek the Scrolls of Thebes in order to remove the Manacle of Osiris from Alex. Having both would allow him to rule the world unchallenged. In the first season finale, when it comes to the fight in the Paris catacombs where the Scrolls of Thebes are, he does regain them before they end up being destroyed by Alex using the Manacle's power to bring a torch underneath the Scrolls of Thebes to set them on fire, ensuring neither side has them. Though he was thought dead when fighting the Minotaur within the flooding catacombs, Imhotep managed to survive and strove to find other ways to conquer the world. During the second season, he manages to resurrect his long-lost love, an evil priestess Anck-su-namun and has an alliance with other antagonists such as Nizam Toth. In the series finale, "The Reckoning", Imhotep steals the medallion of Medjai to access Duat (the underworld in ancient Egyptian mythology) and form the army of the dead. During the battle, Alex unlocks the "power within" from the medallion and throws Imhotep into the underworld.

== See also ==
- Kharis
