= Kharis =

- The Mummy character
- The changing face of Kharis: Lon Chaney's mask-like countenance in The Mummy's Ghost (1944) is considerably less gruesome than his previous appearance in The Mummy's Tomb (1942) and endures as the most familiar image of the character.
- First appearance: The Mummy's Hand
- Last appearance: The Mummy: Dark Universe Stories
- Portrayed by: Tom Tyler (1940); Lon Chaney Jr. (1942–1944); Eddie Parker (1955); Christopher Lee (1959)

In-universe information
- Species: Mummy
- Gender: Male
- Occupation: High priest
- Nationality: Egyptian
- Date of birth: 2000-3000 years ago
- Status: Deceased

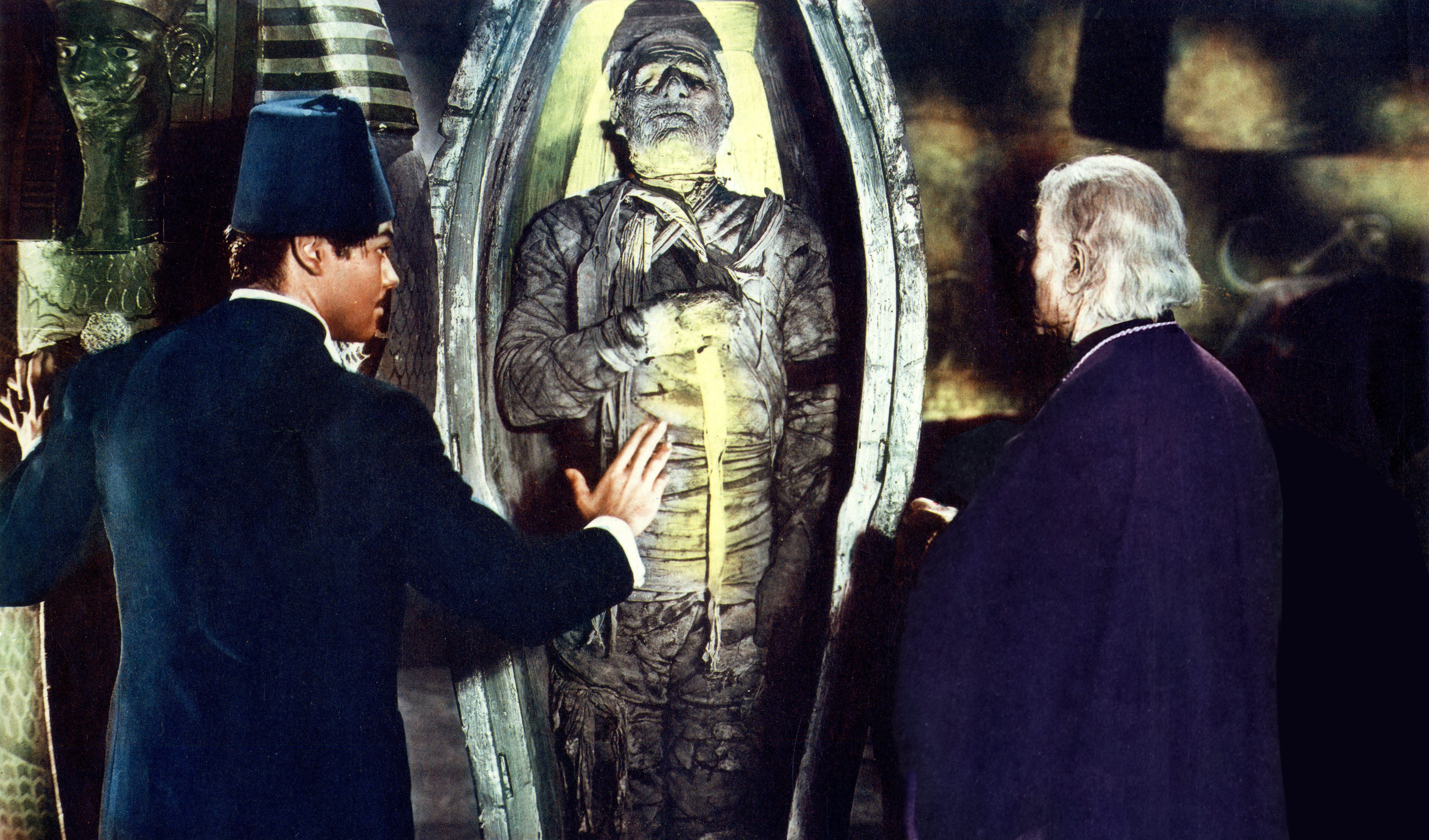
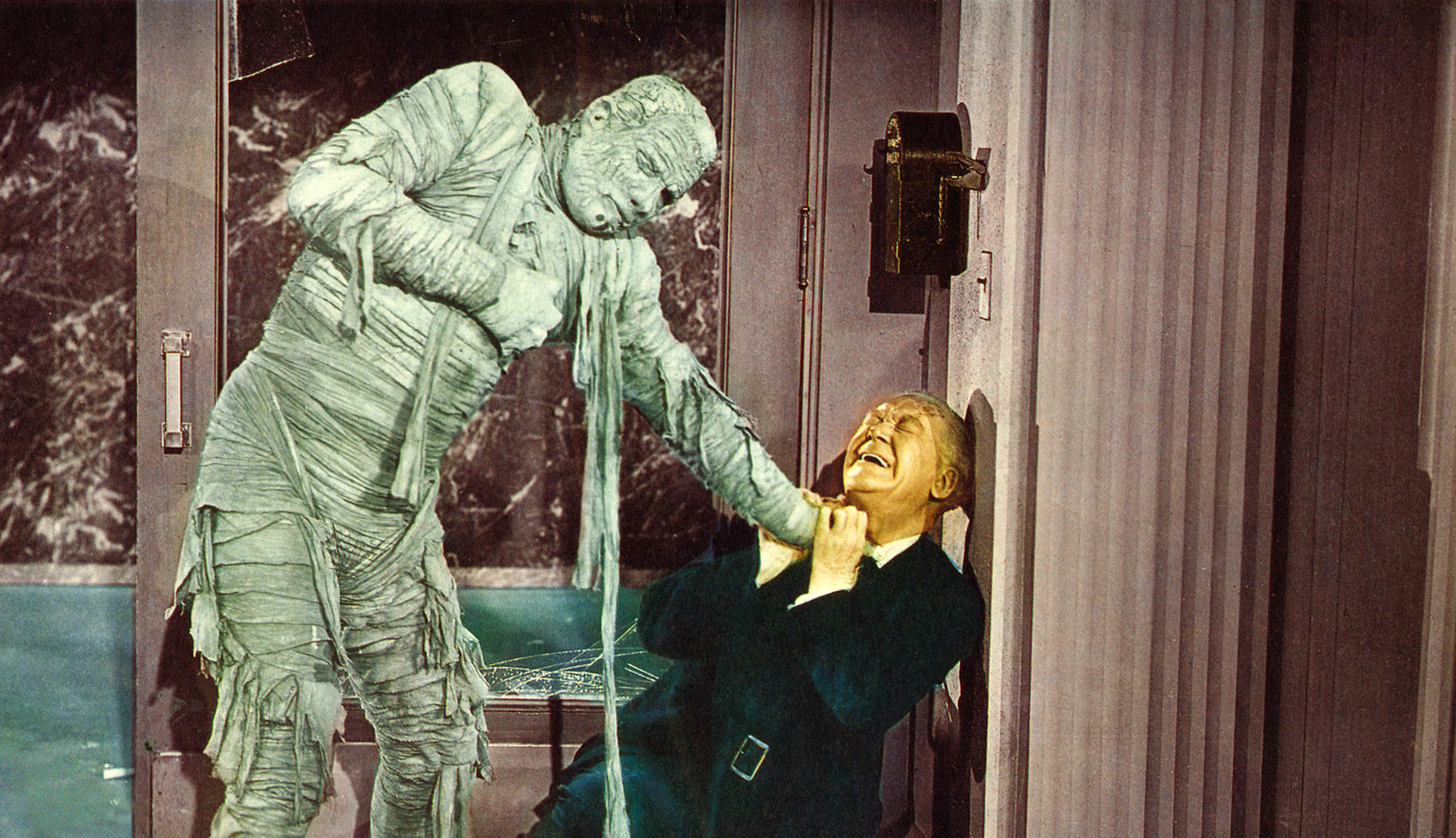
Colorized publicity shots for The Mummy's Tomb (1942) and The Mummy's Ghost (1944). Lon Chaney Jr. played Kharis in three out of four follow-ups to the original film.

Kharis (/kɑːˈriːs/) is a character featured in Universal Studios's Mummy series in the 1940s, following their original 1932 film The Mummy, which starred Boris Karloff as a different mummy character, Imhotep, though their backstories are practically identical. Universal's Mummy films were inspired by worldwide interest in Egyptian archeology during the first half of the 20th century.

== History ==
In the first Kharis film, The Mummy's Hand (1940), the character was played by Western-film actor Tom Tyler, while the three subsequent films, The Mummy's Tomb (1942), The Mummy's Ghost (1944), and The Mummy's Curse (also 1944), starred Lon Chaney Jr. in the role. Although the iconic image of the mummy's face is usually Karloff's, the Kharis films are responsible for the enduring stereotype of the lumbering, foot-dragging monster, as Karloff's bandaged creation is seen only briefly, while Kharis is a major on-screen character in all four follow-up films. The Kharis films also introduce the notion of tana leaves as integral to the mummy's survival.

The Mummy's Hand introduces Kharis in a series of flashbacks that are pulled from the original 1932 film (except for inserts with Tyler replacing Karloff in shots in which Karloff would have been conspicuous). The film The Mummy, which was released eight years before The Mummy's Hand, tells the story of the high priest Imhotep, who is punished for attempting to resurrect a dead lover, and thousands of years later returns to the Earth as a living mummy. In The Mummy's Hand, however, the mummy is a royal prince named Kharis and the details of the story are changed to describe a similar but alternative scenario. For this reason, the Kharis films are not sequels to the original, as occasionally misperceived.

Eddie Parker portrayed Klaris, a similarly named mummy, in the 1955 comedy Abbott and Costello Meet the Mummy.

Christopher Lee portrayed Kharis in the 1959 Hammer Film Productions horror film The Mummy.

=== Dark Universe ===
Kharis appears in the The Mummy: Dark Universe Stories video game alongside The Mummy's Hand character Dr. Charles Petrie, set after the 2017 film The Mummy. The game retroactively establishes The Mummy films of the 1930s–1950s as part of the canonical chronology of the Dark Universe. Charles Trowbridge's likeness was used to represent his character Dr. Petrie in-game, while the likeness of Tom Tyler was used to represent Kharis.

== Design ==
The makeup for Kharis was designed by Universal's resident monster expert Jack Pierce. While Tyler's features can be discerned easily under the makeup (as could Karloff's), Chaney is unrecognizable, due to the use of a mask rather than customized make-up over the course of the series (Pierce had earlier fashioned a mask for Tyler to wear for certain long shots in The Mummy's Hand, and the difference between the mask and the painstaking original make-up is fairly easy to spot on film). While in The Wolf Man Chaney played the starring role both in and out of make-up, Tyler was shown as the human Kharis in Chaney's Mummy films during flashback scenes, a somewhat demoralizing budgetary measure that showed Chaney's importance by this time to be mainly that of his famous name.

== See also ==
- Imhotep
