= The Mummy's Curse =

1944 American horror film

- Theatrical release poster
- Directed by: Leslie Goodwins
- Screenplay by: Bernard Schubert
- Story by: Leon Abrams; Dwight V. Babcock
- Produced by: Oliver Drake
- Starring: Lon Chaney Jr.; Peter Coe; Virginia Christine
- Cinematography: Virgil Miller
- Edited by: Fred R. Feitshans Jr.
- Music by: William Lava; Paul Sawtell
- Production company: Universal Studios
- Distributed by: Universal Pictures
- Release date: December 22, 1944
- Running time: 60 minutes
- Country: United States
- Language: English

The Mummy's Curse is a 1944 American horror film directed by Leslie Goodwins. Produced by Universal Pictures, it is the fifth entry in Universal's original Mummy franchise, serving as a sequel to The Mummy's Ghost (1944). It marks Lon Chaney Jr.'s final appearance as Kharis, an Egyptian mummy.

The plot of The Mummy's Curse continues the story of Kharis and his beloved Princess Ananka, is supposed to take place in the same swampy location that was the setting of The Mummy's Ghost. While the earlier film was explicitly set in rural Massachusetts, this film strongly implies that the swamp is in Louisiana, with references to Cajuns and bayous.

== Plot ==
The Southern Engineering Company is trying to drain the local swamp for the public good. However, the efforts are being hampered by the superstitions of the workers, who believe the area to be haunted by the mummy and his bride, buried in the swamp 25 years prior.

Two representatives of the Scripps Museum, Dr. James Halsey and Dr. Ilzor Zandaab, arrive on the scene and present their credentials to the head of the project, Pat Walsh. They have come to search for the missing mummies. Their conversation is interrupted by the news that a workman has been murdered in the swamps. Evidence at the scene convinces Halsey that the murderer has found the mummy of Kharis.

Later that evening, Zandaab sneaks into the swamp and meets Ragheb. Ragheb is a disciple of the Arkam sect, and Zandaab is secretly a High Priest. The follower killed the worker that unearthed Kharis, and has taken the immobile monster to a deserted monastery.

Zandaab explains the legend of Kharis and Ananka to Ragheb as he brews the tana leaves, giving instructions on their use. The old sacristan of the monastery intrudes on their ritual, and is promptly executed by a risen Kharis.

Meanwhile, the mummy of Ananka rises from the swamp after being partially uncovered by a bulldozer during the excavation. She immerses herself in a pond and the mud is washed away, revealing an attractive young woman.

Cajun Joe finds the girl wandering listlessly in the swamps, calling out the name "Kharis". He takes her to Tante Berthe, the owner of the local pub, who aids the girl. Later, Kharis finds her there and murders Berthe, as Ananka flees into the night.

Ananka is soon found lying unconscious beside the road by Halsey and Betty Walsh, the niece of Pat Walsh. While in their care, and although apparently suffering from amnesia, the girl displays an incredible knowledge of ancient Egypt. Her stay at Halsey's camp is again interrupted by the appearance of Kharis, and the kindly physician, Dr. Cooper, is killed. She again takes flight, and Halsey and the others go in search of her.

Fleeing the monster after he attacks and kills Cajun Joe, she comes to Betty's tent seeking refuge. However, Kharis is not far behind. He enters the tent and whisks away his Princess, leaving the horrified Betty unhurt.

Betty asks Ragheb for his help in finding Dr. Halsey. The treacherous disciple has other ideas, and takes her to the monastery instead. Zandaab, having already administered the tana fluid to the young Ananka, is angered to find Ragheb making advances on Betty. He orders her death, but Ragheb kills him instead. Halsey arrives, tracking them from the camp after finding Betty's tent destroyed. A struggle ensues between Ragheb and Halsey, until Kharis intervenes. The creature, sensing Ragheb's betrayal, advances on his former ally.

Locking himself inside a cell-like room, Ragheb is powerless to do anything but watch as Kharis brings down the walls on the two of them. Halsey, Betty and the rest find the mummified remains of Ananka in the adjoining room.

== Cast ==
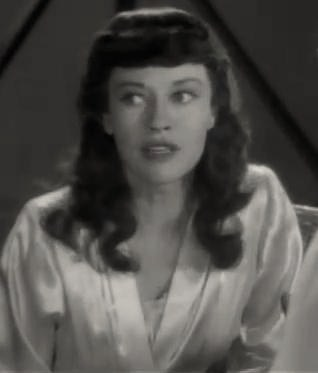
Virginia Christine

- Lon Chaney Jr. as Kharis the Mummy
- Dennis Moore as Dr. James Halsey
- Kay Harding as Betty Walsh
- Virginia Christine as Princess Ananka
- Addison Richards as Pat Walsh
- Peter Coe as Dr. Ilzor Zandaab
- Martin Kosleck as Ragheb
- Kurt Katch as Cajun Joe
- Ann Codee as Tante Berthe
- Holmes Herbert as Dr. Cooper
- Napoleon Simpson as Goobie
- Charles Stevens as Achilles
- William Farnum as Watchman at the Church Ruins

Tom Tyler appears as Kharis in the flashback sequence through the use of footage from The Mummy's Hand, the second film in the series.

== Themes ==
This film follows the events at the end of the previous film where Ananka and Kharis perish in the swamp. The original working title for this film—the fifth in Universal's Mummy series—was The Mummy's Return.

== Production ==
The Mummy's Curse made use of footage from two of Universal's previous mummy films, The Mummy (1932) and The Mummy's Hand (1940).

== Release ==
The Mummy's Curse was released to theaters on December 22, 1944.

=== Home media ===
The Mummy's Curse was released on DVD in 2004 as part of the Universal Legacy Collection. It was also released on Blu-Ray in 2016 with the same Mummy films, including one starring Abbott and Costello. The only special feature on the single disc is the theatrical trailer, while the other films have making-of documentaries, trailers, commentaries, interviews, and original poster artwork.

== Reception ==
The Mummy's Curse generally received moderate to poor reviews with criticism aimed at the use of stock footage and the confusion of the location of the story as New England is not known for its swamp areas. It holds a 40% fresh rating at the movie review site Rotten Tomatoes.

Writing for Famous Monsters in 1962, Joe Dante Jr. included The Mummy's Curse on his list of the worst horror films ever made. Dante's described the film as a "disappointing potpourri of all the shopworn gimmicks used since 1940". Dante found that the acting from Coe & Kosleck was not strong and that the film "seemed to drag on in repetition".

James Lowder reviewed The Mummy's Curse in White Wolf Inphobia #53 (March, 1995), rating it a 3 out of 5 and stated that "Despite the standard use of stock footage, the insulting stereotypes of black and Cajun workers, and the looong rehash of the previous Kharis stories, Curse boasts a few stylish touches all its own. There are one or two chilling scenes in which the sound of the mummy's distinctive walk is used to great effect."
