= The Mummy's Hand =

1940 film directed by Christy Cabanne

- Theatrical release poster
- Directed by: Christy Cabanne
- Screenplay by: Griffin Jay; Maxwell Shane
- Story by: Griffin Jay
- Produced by: Ben Pivar
- Starring: Dick Foran; Peggy Moran; Wallace Ford; Eduardo Ciannelli; George Zucco
- Cinematography: Elwood Bredell
- Edited by: Philip Cahn
- Music by: Frank Skinner; Hans J. Salter
- Production company: Universal Pictures Company, Inc.
- Distributed by: Universal Pictures Company, Inc.
- Release date: 20 September 1940
- Running time: 67 minutes
- Country: United States
- Budget: $84,000

The Mummy's Hand is a 1940 American horror film directed by Christy Cabanne and produced by Ben Pivar for Universal Studios. Shot in black-and-white, the film is about the ancient Egyptian mummy of Kharis (Tom Tyler), who is kept alive with a brew of tana leaves by The High Priest (Eduardo Ciannelli) and his successor Andoheb (George Zucco). Meanwhile, archeologists Steve Banning (Dick Foran) and Babe Jenson (Wallace Ford) persuade magician Solvani (Cecil Kellaway) to finance an expedition in search of the tomb of Princess Ananka. They are joined by Solvani's daughter Marta (Peggy Moran), and followed by Andoheb who is also the professor of Egyptology at the Cairo Museum. Kharis is ordered to kill off expedition members Dr. Petrie (Charles Trowbridge) and Ali (Leon Belasco), while Andoheb becomes attracted to Marta who he plans to kidnap and make immortal.

The Mummy's Hand was made after the financial success of two other Universal Products: Son of Frankenstein and The Invisible Man Returns which led to the studio making a follow-up to The Mummy (1932). The film had what was described as a "modest" budget and reuses footage from The Mummy as well as reusing nearly the entire score from Son of Frankenstein. However, the film has no shared plot with the original film and is not considered a sequel or a remake. The film was shot with a planned budget of $80,000 but went $4,000 over-budget as production completed. The film was released on September 20, 1940, and was followed by a sequel titled The Mummy's Tomb in 1942.

== Plot ==
In Egypt, Andoheb travels to the Hill of the Seven Jackals in answer to the summons of The High Priest of Karnak. The dying priest of the sect explains the story of Kharis to Andoheb: over three thousand years ago Prince Kharis had secretly loved Princess Ananka, but she died. Kharis stole sacred, life-giving tana leaves, but he was caught before he could use them to restore life to the dead Princess Ananka. Kharis's penalty upon being discovered was to be buried alive, without a tongue, and the tana leaves were buried with him. Priests recovered him and kept him alive as protector of Ananka's tomb. During the cycle of the full moon, the fluid from the brew of three tana leaves must be administered to the creature to keep him alive. Should despoilers enter the tomb of the Princess, a fluid of nine leaves will restore movement to the monster so he can protect it from defilers. Any more than nine will make him uncontrollable.

In Cairo, down on his luck archaeologist Steve Banning and his buffoon sidekick, Babe Jenson, discover the remnants of a broken vase in a bazaar. Banning is convinced it is an authentic ancient Egyptian relic, and his interpretation of the hieroglyphs on the piece leads him to believe it contains clues to the location of Princess Ananka's tomb. Banning visits Andoheb, who misleads him about the importance of the vase and then drops and breaks it on purpose. With the support of the eminent Dr. Petrie of the Cairo Museum, but against the wishes of Andoheb, who is professor of Egyptology at the museum, Banning seeks funds for his expedition. Banning and Jenson meet an American stage magician, Solvani, who agrees to fund their quest in return for a share of the spoils of the tomb. They then get into a scuffle with Andoheb's henchmen. Solvani's daughter Marta is not convinced of his investment, thanks to a prior visit from Andoheb, who brands the two young archeologists as frauds.

The expedition departs in search of the Hill of the Seven Jackals, with the Solvanis tagging along. In their explorations, they stumble upon the tomb of Kharis, finding the mummy and the tana leaves but nothing to indicate the existence of Ananka's tomb. Andoheb surprises Dr. Petrie in the mummy's cave and has the scientist feel the creature's living pulse. After administering the tana brew from nine leaves, the monster quickly dispatches Petrie by strangling him with one hand, and escapes with Andoheb through a secret passageway to the temple on the other side of the mountain. The creature marauds about the camp, strangling the Egyptian overseer Ali and eventually attacking Solvani and kidnapping Marta. Banning and Jenson set out to track Kharis down, with Jenson going around the mountain and Banning attempting to follow the secret passage they have discovered inside the tomb.

Andoheb has plans of his own: enthralled by Marta's beauty, he plans to inject himself and his captive with tana fluid, making them both immortal. Jenson arrives in the nick of time and shoots Andoheb dead in self-defense, while Banning attempts to rescue Marta. However, Kharis appears on the scene and in the ensuing struggle, Banning's bullets have no effect on the mummy. Marta had overheard Andoheb describe the secret of the tana fluid and tells Banning and Jenson that Kharis must not be allowed to drink any more of it. When the creature raises the tana fluid to his lips, Jenson shoots the container from his grasp. Dropping to the floor, Kharis attempts to ingest the spilled life-giving liquid. Banning seizes the opportunity to overturn a brazier onto the monster, engulfing it in flames.

At the end, the members of the expedition head happily back to the United States with the mummy of Ananka and the diamonds from her tomb.

== Cast ==
Cast is sourced from the book Universal Horrors and ending credits.

- Dick Foran as Steve Banning
- Peggy Moran as Marta Solvani
- Wallace Ford as Babe Jenson
- Eduardo Ciannelli as the High Priest
- George Zucco as High Priest Andoheb
- Cecil Kellaway as Tim Sullivan aka The Great Solvani
- Charles Trowbridge as Dr. Petrie
- Tom Tyler as Kharis
- Sig Arno (credited as Siegfried Arno) as the beggar
- Eddie Foster as an Egyptian
- Harry Stubbs as bartender
- Michael Mark as bazaar owner
- Mara Tartar as the girl
- Leon Belasco as Ali
- Murdock MacQuarrie as priests
- Jerry Frank as an Egyptian thug
- Ken Terrell as an Egyptian thug

== Production ==
Following the financial success of the revival of the Frankenstein series with Son of Frankenstein and The Invisible Man series with The Invisible Man Returns, Universal Pictures decided to revive their The Mummy series with The Mummy's Hand. The film's budget was set at $80,000 and began filming towards the end of May 1940.

The authors of the book Universal Horrors described the budget as "modest" and noted that cost-cutting for the film involved using stock shots taken from The Mummy, leftover sets from James Whale's film Green Hell, and musical scores almost entirely lifted from Son of Frankenstein. The producer for the film was Ben Pivar, who Reginald LeBorg described as the epitome artless, noncreative studio executive who was often crude and occasionally seemed illiterate.

The Mummy's Hand's production continued into mid-June, which led director Christy Cabanne and his crew to film into overtime hours. According to Peggy Moran, she had to be on set at 6am to do hair and makeup and filming began at 8am and would occasionally work as late as 4am the next day. Moran commented that "they could do that with people like me because we were under contract. The law requires that outside talent only work for X-number of hours, but me they could work all the time!" When asked about her fellow cast, she spoke positively about Dick Foran ("very nice and friendly") and Wallace Ford ("very funny always"). On Tom Tyler who played Kharis, she never met him without his make-up on, stating that he had to be at the studio at four in the morning and he couldn't talk with his make-up on. Dick Foran, who played main character Steve Banning, was an established star when he made this, but his career prior to The Mummy's Hand consisted mostly of supporting roles in second tier Universal films and leading roles in "singing cowboy" movies.

The film went over budget and slightly over schedule, costing an extra $4,000. Editing of the film was finished before the end of June.

== Release ==
The Mummy's Hand was distributed by Universal Pictures Co. on September 20, 1940. According to Variety, their screening of the film had certain scenes tinted an "eerie green".

Unlike some of the other horror films produced by Universal, The Mummy's Hand was not reissued for theatrical release in the late 1940s and early 1950s. The Mummy's Hand was followed by the sequel The Mummy's Tomb, released in 1942. The Mummy's Tomb takes place 30 years after the events of The Mummy's Hand, with Foran, Wallace, and Zucco reprising their respective roles as Steve Banning, Babe Hanson, and Andoheb. The film re-uses several minutes of footage from The Mummy's Hand in the form of flashback sequences.

=== Home media ===
In the 1990s, MCA/Universal Home Video released The Mummy's Hand on VHS as part of the "Universal Monsters Classic Collection", a series of releases of Universal Classic Monsters films. In 1994, MCA/Universal released the film on LaserDisc as part of The Mummy Collection six-disc set, which also includes The Mummy's Tomb (1942), The Mummy's Ghost, and The Mummy's Curse (both 1944).

On October 19, 2004, Universal released The Mummy's Hand—along with The Mummy, The Mummy's Tomb, The Mummy's Ghost, and The Mummy's Curse—on DVD as part of the two-disc set The Mummy: The Legacy Collection. In 2014, Universal re-released the five films on DVD as a set titled The Mummy: Complete Legacy Collection. In 2017, The Mummy: Complete Legacy Collection was released on Blu-ray.

The Mummy's Hand was included in the Universal Classic Monsters: Complete 30-Film Collection Blu-ray box set in August 2018. This box set was also issued in the DVD format.

== Critical reception ==
From contemporary reviews, film critic Bosley Crowther of The New York Times commented on the film's use of trope and cliché, and added, "frightening or funny, take your choice". The Philadelphia Record found that the film's plot was "sheer nonsense" but that the film "manages to raise a few more goose pimples than other recent horror movies". "Hobe" of Variety found the film to be "muddled in the writing and clumsy in the production. Direction and photography are bush league. Acting varies from violent mugging to smooth under-playing".

James Lowder reviewed The Mummy's Hand in White Wolf Inphobia #53 (March, 1995), rating it a 3 1/2 out of 5 and stated that "The mummy's defeat (actually, its apparent defeat, since it returns for The Mummy's Tomb) is one of the most pathetic endings for a monster film in history – set ablaze as it lies face-down on the floor, lapping up spilled tana tea. Very unsportsmanlike of Banning, but Kharis evens the score in the next entry."

Graeme Clark of The Spinning Image, comparing the film with Boris Karloff's and granting 6 out of 10 stars, writes: "This was no eerie love story across the millennia, this was straight fright fare with Universal Studios' least-loved monster, here in the form that viewers would know him best, shambling, strangling, singleminded and mute." He also appreciated some of the special effects.

On the review aggregator website Rotten Tomatoes, the film holds a 60% approval rating based on 10 reviews, with an average score of 5.8/10.
