= The Mummy's Ghost =

1944 horror film by Reginald LeBorg

- Directed by: Reginald LeBorg
- Screenplay by: Griffin Jay; Henry Sucher; Brenda Weisberg
- Story by: Griffin Jay; Henry Sucher
- Starring: Lon Chaney Jr.; John Carradine; Ramsay Ames; Barton MacLane; George Zucco; Robert Lowery
- Cinematography: William A. Sickner
- Edited by: Saul Goodkind
- Production company: Universal Pictures Company
- Distributed by: Universal Pictures Company
- Release date: 30 June 1944 (New York)
- Running time: 60 minutes
- Country: United States
- Language: English

The Mummy's Ghost is a 1944 American horror film directed by Reginald LeBorg for Universal. It is the second of three sequels to The Mummy's Hand (1940), following The Mummy's Tomb (1942) and preceding The Mummy's Curse (1944). Lon Chaney Jr. again takes on the role of Kharis the mummy.

== Plot ==
Andoheb, the aging High Priest of Arkam, has summoned Yousef Bey to the Temple of Arkam to pass on the duties of High Priest. Meanwhile, in Mapleton, Massachusetts, Professor Matthew Norman, who had examined one of Kharis' missing bandage pieces during the mummy's last spree through Mapleton, also explains the legends of the Priests of Arkam and Kharis to his history class, who are less than believing. After the lecture ends, one of the students, Tom Hervey, meets up with his girlfriend Amina Mansori, a beautiful woman of Egyptian descent. However, a strange, clouded feeling in her mind occurs whenever the subject of Egypt is mentioned.

Back in Egypt, Andoheb informs Yousef Bey that Kharis still lives and that Yousef's mission is to retrieve Kharis and the body of Ananka and return them to their rightful resting place in Egypt. Yousef Bey pledges his devotion before Andoheb explains that during each full moon, Yousef Bey is to brew the fluid from nine tana leaves. Kharis will sense this and find the leaves wherever they are. On performing the ceremony, Kharis heads toward them but passes the home of Amina who follows Kharis in a trance-like state. Kharis arrives at the home of Professor Norman, strangles him, and drinks the fluid of the tana leaves. Amina sees Kharis, which snaps her out of her trance and causes her to faint and forms a strange new birthmark on her wrist.

The next morning, the Sheriff and Coroner discover a strange mold around the dead professor's throat – a sign they both know to mean that the mummy stalks Mapleton again. Later, Yousef Bey, who has arrived in Mapleton, calls on Amon-Ra to aid him in his quest and begins to brew the tana leaves to summon Kharis. Kharis heads towards him, killing a farmer along the way, as the sheriff soon arrives on the scene and organizes a search party.

The next day, at the Scripps Museum, Yousef Bey emerges after hours from a hiding place as Kharis breaks into the museum. Kharis attempts to touch the mummified body of Ananka, but it disintegrates. Yousef Bey realizes that Ananka's soul has been reincarnated into another form as Kharis begins destroying the exhibit, killing the museum security guard. Police Inspector Walgreen and Dr. Ayad arrive later and decide to use the tana leaves to attract and trap Kharis in a pit.

Meanwhile, Tom disregards the Sheriff's warning and decides to elope with Amina to New York. She agrees and the two make plans to leave early the next morning. Yousef Bey calls upon Amon-Ra to lead him to the new home of Ananka's soul and then sends Kharis in that direction to find Ananka.

As Inspector Walgreen sets the trap for Kharis, Kharis immediately heads toward the Norman home. Amina is awakened by his approach and hypnotically wanders into the yard where Kharis recognizes her as the carrier of Ananka's soul. Amina faints as Kharis carries her away. Amina's guardian Mrs. Blake phones Tom and tells her story to Inspector Walgreen, Sheriff Elwood, and a large group of volunteers. Kharis arrives at the mill and presents Amina to Bey. Bey recognizes the birthmark as the symbol of the priests of Arkam. Amina awakens and the priest informs her that she is the reincarnation of Ananka.

Yousef Bey falls for Amina's beauty and desires to keep her alive as his bride with the tana leaves. This plan enrages Kharis, leading to a fight where Bey falls out a window to his death. Tom enters and after failing to stop Kharis, finds him leaving with Amina. A mob pursues Kharis into a swamp where both he and the rapidly aging Amina sink.

== Cast ==
Cast sourced from the book Universal Horrors:

- Lon Chaney Jr. as Kharis
- John Carradine as Yousef Bey
- Robert Lowery as Tom Hervey
- Ramsay Ames as Amina Mansori
- Barton MacLane as Police Insp. Walgreen
- George Zucco as High Priest Andoheb
- Frank Reicher as Prof. Matthew Norman
- Harry Shannon as Sheriff Elwood
- Emmett Vogan as Coroner
- Lester Sharp as Dr. Ayad
- Claire Whitney as Ella Norman
- Oscar O'Shea as Night Watchman

== Production ==
The Mummy's Ghost was directed by Reginald LeBorg who began his film career in the mid-1930s as an extra at Paramount Pictures and MGM. LeBorg staged opera sequences in a number of musicals and worked on second unit for MGM eventually working at Universal on a short musical She's for Me (1943). According to LeBorg, he was set to direct a comedy following this film but associate producer Ben Pivar had him read the script for The Mummy's Ghost after LeBorg stated that the original director for the film had to be replaced.

The Mummy's Ghost began filming on August 23, 1943. According to LeBorg, actress Acquanetta had the co-starring role in the film as Amina, but she had a fainting spell, collapsed during filming and struck her head. This led to her being replaced with Ramsay Ames. Acquanetta stated that she fell on set on rocks that were supposed to be papier-mache, but were actually rocks painted white and that all she remembered was "I fell and struck my head [...] I woke up in the hospital".

Frederick C. Othman visited the set of The Mummy's Ghost and talked with Chaney who openly discussed his discomfort in his outfit of the mummy Kharis, stating that "I sweat and I can't wipe it away. I itch and I can't scratch". LeBorg spoke of difficulty working with Chaney on set, stating that in the scene where Kharis attacks Professor Norman, Chaney seized Frank Reicher's throat and "squeezed so forcefully that Reicher nearly fainted".

Filming ended September 1, 1943. The 2023 BearManor Media book "The Mummy's Ghost" by Gregory W. Mank and Tom Weaver provides the full story of the making of the movie, plus script, pressbook and other extras.

== Release ==
The Mummy's Ghost was first shown in New York on June 30, 1944. It was distributed by the Universal Pictures Company. The film was followed by a sequel also released in 1944, The Mummy's Curse.

== Reception ==
From contemporary reviews, William R. Weaver noted that the film had "considerable polish" and that it "sticks to its premise well enough" and that Chaney's performance in the film "advances his claim to a large following". Other reviewers commented on its relationship with the rest of the series with The New York World-Telegram stating: "The Mummy always has been the least impressive of movie monsters and he is doing nothing to enhance his reputation in his latest incarnation". A review in Harrison's Reports declared the film as "mediocre" and the weakest of The Mummy series.

From retrospective reviews, the authors of the book Universal Horrors stated that The Mummy's Ghost was "arguably, the best of The Mummy's Hand three sequels" and was "easily [LeBorg]'s best horror film, possibly his best film, period", noting that "despite all its shortcomings, The Mummy's Ghost shapes up as one of Universal's better Bs from this era of decline", praising elements such as Kharis having some sympathetic qualities which helped expand the series. Hans J. Wollstein of AllMovie gave the film a two out of five rating, finding that series was suffering "from a bad case of battle fatigue by 1944" and that the film was "arguably the weakest entry in the four-picture series".

James Lowder reviewed The Mummy's Ghost in White Wolf Inphobia #53 (March, 1995), rating it a 2 1/2 out of 5 and stated that "The Mummy's Ghost offers a downbeat ending, which is quite a surprise given its earlier silliness, but that only helps the movie rise ever so slightly above its downright dull predecessor."
