= The Mummy (1999 film) =

1999 film by Stephen Sommers

- Theatrical release poster
- Directed by: Stephen Sommers
- Screenplay by: Stephen Sommers
- Story by: Stephen Sommers; Lloyd Fonvielle; Kevin Jarre
- Based on: The Mummy by: John L. Balderston; Nina Wilcox Putnam; Richard Schayer
- Produced by: James Jacks; Sean Daniel
- Starring: Brendan Fraser; Rachel Weisz; John Hannah; Arnold Vosloo; Jonathan Hyde; Kevin J. O'Connor
- Cinematography: Adrian Biddle
- Edited by: Bob Ducsay
- Music by: Jerry Goldsmith
- Production company: Universal Pictures Alphaville Films
- Distributed by: Universal Pictures
- Release date: May 7, 1999 (United States)
- Running time: 125 minutes
- Country: United States
- Languages: English; Arabic; Egyptian
- Budget: $80 million
- Box office: $422.5 million

The Mummy is a 1999 American action-adventure film written and directed by Stephen Sommers and starring Brendan Fraser, Rachel Weisz, John Hannah, and Arnold Vosloo. A loose remake of the 1932 film The Mummy, Sommers' The Mummy follows the adventurer and treasure hunter Rick O'Connell as he travels to Hamunaptra, the City of the Dead, with librarian Evelyn Carnahan and her older brother Jonathan, where they accidentally awaken Imhotep, a cursed high priest with supernatural powers.

Development took years, with multiple screenplays and directors attached. Sommers successfully pitched his version of a more adventurous and romantic take on the source material. Filming took place in Morocco and the United Kingdom; the crew endured dehydration, sandstorms and snakes shooting on location in the Sahara Desert. Industrial Light & Magic provided many of the visual effects, blending live-action footage and computer-generated imagery to create Imhotep, while Jerry Goldsmith composed the orchestral score.

The Mummy was theatrically released on May 7, 1999 by Universal Pictures. The film received mixed critical reviews but grossed $422.5 million worldwide against a production budget of $80 million, becoming the sixth-highest-grossing film of 1999. The film started a new franchise, with three sequels, The Mummy Returns in 2001, The Mummy: Tomb of the Dragon Emperor in 2008, The Mummy: Book of the Dead in 2027, and various spinoffs such as an animated series, which ran from 2001 to 2003, and the prequel The Scorpion King in 2002, which led to sequels of its own. In 2017, an attempt was made to start another Universal Monsters franchise with The Mummy.

== Plot ==
In Thebes, Egypt, 1290 BC, Pharaoh Seti I discovers that his high priest Imhotep is having an affair with his mistress Anck-su-namun. The two kill Seti when he confronts them. Anck-su-namun takes her own life to buy Imhotep time to escape the Medjai, Pharaoh's bodyguards. Imhotep and his priests steal Anck-su-namun's corpse and travel to the city of Hamunaptra to resurrect her, but the Medjai intervene. As punishment, Imhotep's priests are mummified alive, while Imhotep is cursed and buried alive with flesh-eating scarabs. The Medjai are sworn to prevent Imhotep's return, as his resurrection would grant him immense power and immortality.

In 1926 AD Cairo, Kingdom of Egypt, Jonathan Carnahan presents his sister, Evelyn—a librarian and aspiring Egyptologist working for museum curator Dr. Terence Bey—with an intricate box and map that lead to Hamunaptra, the existence of which is now considered a myth. Jonathan reveals he stole the box from American adventurer and treasure hunter Rick O'Connell, who discovered the city while in the French Foreign Legion three years earlier. Evelyn bargains with a corrupt prison warden to free the incarcerated Rick so he can take them to Hamunaptra, where she hopes to find the golden Book of Amun-Ra.

The group finds themselves competing with an American expedition, guided by Rick's cowardly fellow former Legionnaire Beni Gabor. The Medjai ambush the expeditions, and their leader Ardeth Bay cautions them to leave. Ignoring the warnings, the two expeditions continue to dig through the ruins. The Americans find the Book of the Dead as well as five canopic jars, while Evelyn, Rick, and Jonathan accidentally discover Imhotep's mummified remains.

That night, Evelyn steals the Book of the Dead from the rival camp, accidentally awakening the mummified Imhotep when she reads the text contained within. Following a confrontation with Imhotep as well as the Medjai, the expeditions flee back to Cairo. Imhotep spares Beni's life to serve as a translator when he discovers that Beni can speak Hebrew.

Imhotep follows the expeditions back to Cairo and unleashes the biblical Plagues of Egypt. The Americans who discovered the Book of the Dead are hunted and killed by Imhotep, restoring his human form and strengthening his power. Attempting to find answers at the museum, Rick, Evelyn and Jonathan instead find Ardeth being hosted by Dr. Bey, revealed to be a fellow Medjai. The group surmises that Imhotep wants to resurrect Anck-su-namun using Evelyn as a human sacrifice, and that the only way to stop him is to return to Hamunaptra and find the Book of Amun-Ra. The group are soon cornered by Imhotep and a mind-controlled mob. Evelyn is captured while Dr. Bey sacrifices himself to allow the others to escape.

The remaining three convince Rick's old friend and pilot Winston Havelock to fly them to Hamunaptra. Imhotep conjures a magical sandstorm, crashing their plane and killing Winston. Reaching the city on foot, Rick and Jonathan find the Book of Amun-Ra, while Ardeth fights Imhotep's resurrected servants. Jonathan and Rick reach the ritual chamber, where Rick frees Evelyn, and Jonathan uses the book to control several guards, ordering them to kill a resurrected Anck-su-namun. Evelyn uses the book to make Imhotep mortal; Rick fatally stabs him, and Imhotep vows revenge as he decomposes back into a corpse.

Meanwhile, Beni, pilfering treasure from Hamunaptra, inadvertently triggers a booby-trap. Rick, Evelyn and Jonathan escape the collapsing city while Beni is buried inside and devoured by scarabs. Outside, the group discover Ardeth survived, and he bids them farewell as they depart, taking some of Beni's plundered loot with them.

== Cast ==
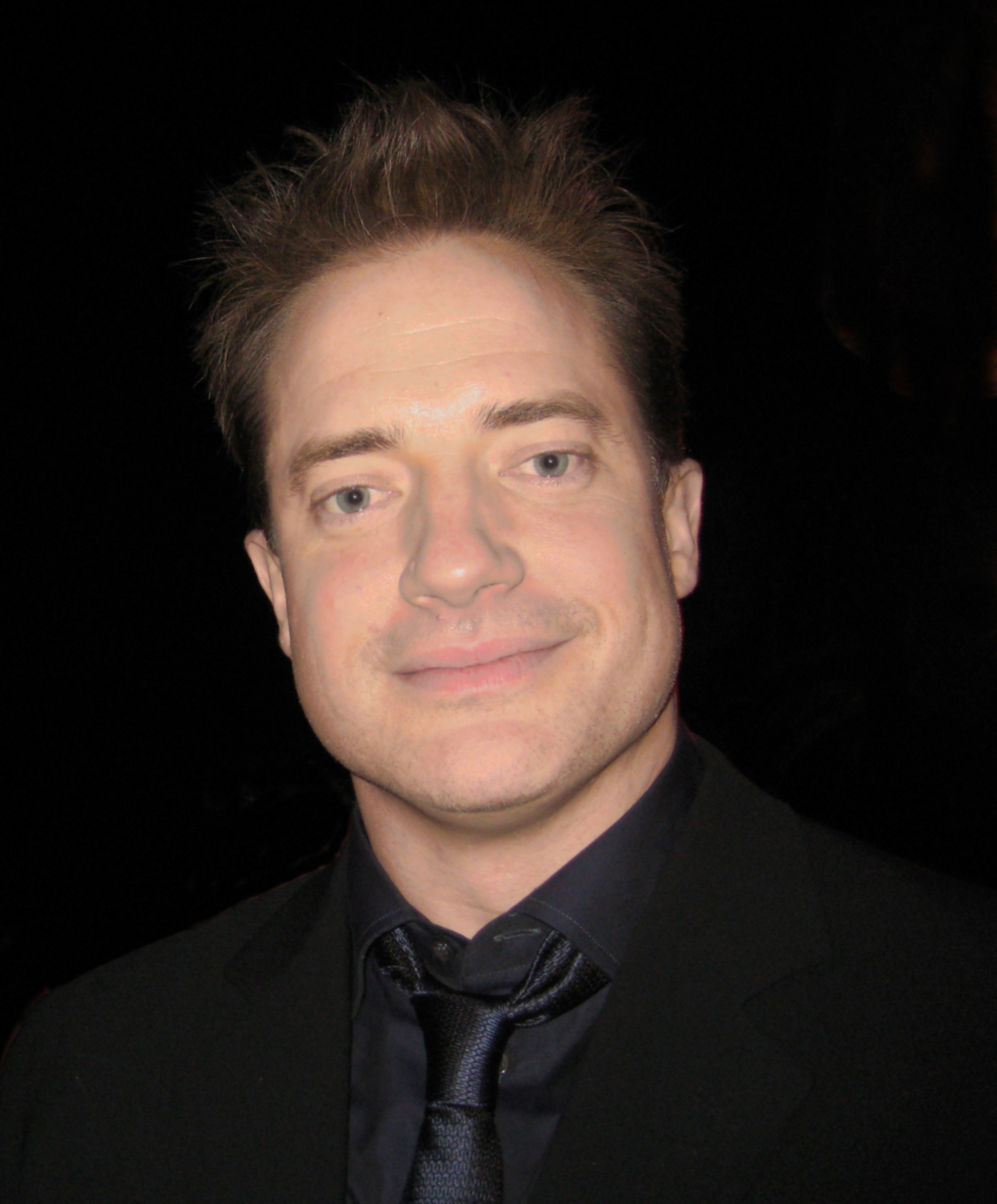
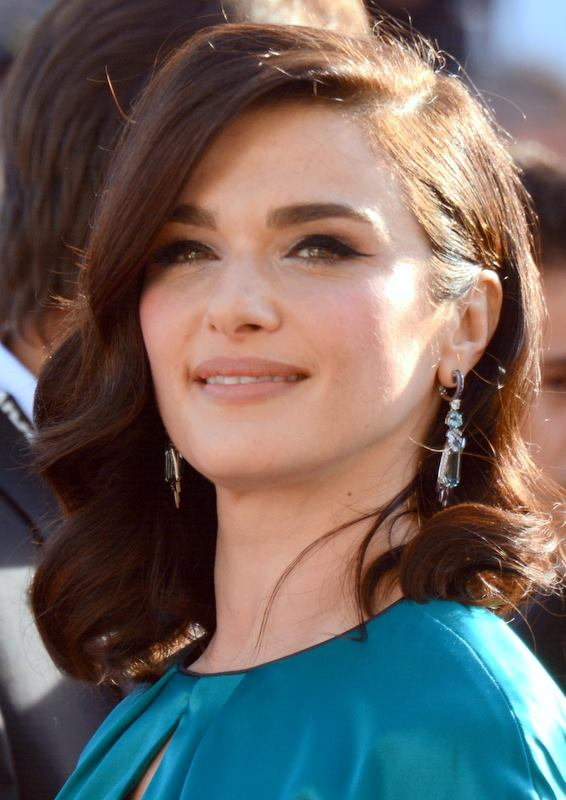
Brendan Fraser and Rachel Weisz star in the film as Rick O'Connell and Evelyn Carnahan.
- Brendan Fraser as Rick O'Connell
- Rachel Weisz as Evelyn Carnahan
- John Hannah as Jonathan Carnahan
- Arnold Vosloo as Imhotep
- Kevin J. O'Connor as Beni Gabor
- Jonathan Hyde as Dr. Allen Chamberlain
- Oded Fehr as Ardeth Bay and the narrator at the beginning of the movie
- Erick Avari as Dr. Terence Bey
- Stephen Dunham as Isaac Henderson
- Corey Johnson as David Daniels
- Tuc Watkins as Bernard Burns
- Omid Djalili as Warden Gad Hassan
- Aharon Ipalé as Pharaoh Seti I
- Bernard Fox as Captain Winston Havelock
- Patricia Velásquez as Anck-su-namun
- Carl Chase as Hook, a one-handed member of the Medjai
- Mohammed Afifi as hangman
- Abderrahim El Aadili as camel guide

== Production ==
=== Development ===
In the late 1980s, the producers James Jacks and Sean Daniel decided to update the 1932 horror film The Mummy for the modern era. Universal gave them the go-ahead, but only if they kept the budget around $10 million. Jacks remembers that the studio "essentially wanted a low-budget horror franchise". In 1987, George A. Romero wrote a film treatment, and was attached to direct. Screenwriter Abbie Bernstein recalled that Universal wanted an unstoppable Mummy akin to the Terminator. Bernstein's story took place in the present; scientists inadvertently bring a mummy to life, who wants to use an ancient device to destroy all life on earth. "[The Mummy] had no more social interaction than the Tyrannosaurus did in Jurassic Park," Bernstein recalled. Romero drifted away from the project and the script was abandoned.

Next, Jacks and Daniel recruited horror filmmaker/writer Clive Barker to direct after his success with Hellraiser (1987). Barker's 1990 treatment and a successive 1991 screenplay by Mick Garris were dark and violent with the story revolving around an art museum that rebuilds an entire Egyptian tomb in Beverly Hills. Jacks recalls that Barker's take was "dark, sexual and filled with mysticism", and that, "it would have been a great low-budget movie". Barker recalled the concept was too weird for the studio, and that his vision treated the Mummy as a jumping-off point for the film instead of the central character.

Alan Ormsby, unaware of previous efforts to launch the film, was brought on next. He pitched a more straightforward update to the 1932 film, again focusing on the Mummy as a relentless Terminator-like character. Joe Dante was attached as director, increasing the budget for his idea of Daniel Day-Lewis as a brooding Mummy. This version's draft was later re-written by John Sayles. It was set in contemporary times and focused on reincarnation with elements of a love story. It came close to being made—with some elements like the flesh-eating scarabs making it to the final product—but Universal balked at the higher price tag.

Romero returned to the project seven years later in 1994 with a vision of a zombie-style horror film similar to Night of the Living Dead (1968), but which also relied heavily upon elements of tragic romance and ambivalence of identity. Romero completed a draft in October 1994, co-written with Ormsby and Sayles, that revolved around a female archaeologist named Helen Grover and her discovery of the tomb of Imhotep, an Egyptian general who lived in the time of Ramesses II. Unfolding in a nameless American city in modern times, events are set into motion when Imhotep inadvertently awakens as a result of his body having been exposed to rays from an MRI scan in a high-tech forensic archaeology lab. Helen finds herself drawn into a tentative relationship with Imhotep while also experiencing clairvoyant flashbacks to a previous life in the Nineteenth Dynasty of Egypt as a priestess of Isis. Summoning mystical powers through incantation, Imhotep later resurrects the mummy of Karis, a loyal slave. Karis embarks on a vengeful rampage against the grave robbers of his tomb. Romero's script was considered too dark and violent by Jacks and the studio, who wanted a more accessible picture. Romero was unable to extricate himself from another contract he had in negotiation with MGM and so his involvement with the film was severed and the development of an entirely new script was commissioned.

Garris returned in 1995, developing a script that combined elements of the 1932 film and 1942's The Mummy's Tomb. This draft was a period piece awash in Egyptian art-inspired Art Deco, but the vision once again proved too expensive for the studio and was discarded for a modern setting. While the project came close to entering production, Universal was sold to Seagram. Sheinberg chose to produce The Mummy through his independent company and write a new script. Unable to find a suitable high-profile writer and director (Wes Craven was offered, but he turned it down) the project unraveled again and Garris left the project for the second time.

Still determined to create a new Mummy film, Universal hired Kevin Jarre in 1996 to write a new screenplay. According to Jacks, the executives were now convinced the film should be a larger-budget period piece. Stephen Sommers called Jacks and Daniel in 1997 with his vision of The Mummy "as a kind of Indiana Jones or Jason and the Argonauts with the mummy as the creature giving the hero a hard time". Sommers had seen the original film when he was eight and wanted to recreate the things he liked about it on a bigger scale. Discussing other classic horror characters, Sommers recalled that "Frankenstein made me sad—I always felt sorry for him. Dracula was kind of cool and sexy. But The Mummy just plain scared me." He had wanted to make a Mummy film, but other writers or directors were always attached.

After the box office failure of Babe: Pig in the City (1998), among others, Universal needed a hit film. At the time, Universal's management had changed in response to the box office failures, and the losses led the studio to revisit its successful franchises from the 1930s. New chair Stacey Snider distributed packets detailing the studio's holdings—including nearly 5,000 old scripts and films. Sommers received his window of opportunity and pitched his Mummy to Universal with an 18-page treatment. Sommers did not want to remake the original film; he described the original as a horror film while his adaption would be "more of a romantic-adventure-horror movie". Sommers incorporated his own research and the services of a UCLA archaeology professor to make the ancient Egyptian language accurate. Snider recalled that Sommers' treatment was unique in that it took place in the 1920s, rather than a contemporary setting. Universal liked the treatment so much that they approved the concept and increased the budget, (Note: While various sources report The Mummy's final budget as $80 million, a 2019 retrospective quoted Sommers as pegging the number at $62 million.) and Sommers spent a year working on the screenplay.

=== Casting ===
Jacks offered the role of Rick O'Connell to Tom Cruise (who was later cast in the reboot film), Brad Pitt, Matt Damon and Ben Affleck, but the actors were not interested or could not fit the role into their respective schedules. Jacks and Sommers were impressed with George of the Jungle's box office earnings and cast Brendan Fraser as a result; Sommers also commented that he felt Fraser fit the Errol Flynn swashbuckling character he had envisioned for Rick perfectly. Fraser's role in George bolstered his perceived star power, yet he remained far cheaper than the biggest actors working. Fraser understood that his character "doesn't take himself too seriously, otherwise the audience can't go on that journey with him."

Evelyn Carnahan was named in tribute to Lady Evelyn Herbert, the daughter of amateur Egyptologist Lord Carnarvon, both present at the opening of the tomb of Tutankhamun in 1922. The studio originally considered American actresses, and Rachel Weisz auditioned multiple times before getting the part. Weisz was not a big fan of horror films, but saw the movie as more of a "hokum" comic book. John Hannah was picked for the role of Jonathan Carnahan, despite the fact that Hannah felt he was not a comedic actor, with Sommers saying that, "He had no idea why we cast him."

Jacks had previously produced Hard Target (1993) with Arnold Vosloo. The South African actor liked the Mummy script but told Sommers he wanted to play the role "absolutely straight. From Imhotep's point of view, this is a skewed version of Romeo and Juliet." He was offered the role after a single audition. Carrying some extra weight and conscious of it because of Imhotep's skimpy costume, Vosloo lost 10 to 15 pounds for the role by eschewing alcohol and sugar.

=== Filming ===
Principal photography began on May 4, 1998, and lasted 17 weeks. The crew was unable to shoot in Egypt due to unstable political conditions, so filming began in Marrakesh, Morocco. Marrakesh had the extra advantage of being much less modern than Cairo, making it easier to dress like the 1920s. The production set up two weeks before filming, taking down telephone wires and cables and shipping in period cars and camels. Locals served as extras for crowd scenes. After shooting in Marrakesh, filming moved to the Sahara desert outside the small town of Erfoud. Production designer Allan Cameron found a geologic feature, Gara Medouar, where the exteriors for Hamunaptra could be constructed.

A concrete ramp was built to allow access into the horseshoe-shaped formation, where the city was built from prefabricated parts shipped from England. A survey of the area was conducted so that an accurate model and scale models of the columns and statues could be replicated back at Shepperton Studios, where all of the scenes involving the underground passageways of the City of the Dead were shot. These sets took 16 weeks to build and included fiberglass columns rigged with special effects for the movie's final scenes.

To avoid dehydration in the scorching heat of the Sahara, the production's medical team created a drink that the cast and crew had to consume every two hours. Sandstorms were daily inconveniences, and wildlife were a major problem, with many crew members having to be airlifted to medical care after being bitten or stung. Fraser nearly died during a scene where his character is hanged. The production had the official support of the Royal Moroccan Army, and the cast members had kidnapping insurance taken out on them.

After shooting in North Africa, production moved back to the United Kingdom before completion on August 29, 1998. Here, the dockyards at Chatham doubled for the Giza Port on the Nile River. This set was 600 feet (183 m) in length and featured "a steam train, an Ajax traction engine, three cranes, an open two-horse carriage, four horse-drawn carts, five dressing horses and grooms, nine pack donkeys and mules, as well as market stalls, Arab-clad vendors and room for 300 costumed extras".

=== Special effects ===
The filmmakers reportedly spent $15 million of the budget on special effects alone. The Mummy features hundreds of shots that required optical or digital special effects in post-production. Effects house Industrial Light & Magic (ILM) contributed more than 140 shots, with additional work done by Cinesite (60 shots) and Pacific Title/Mirage (45 shots, and the film's title sequences.) Sommers engaged ILM while still developing the script, having previously worked with ILM effects supervisor John Berton on Deep Rising (1998). ILM was eager for the challenge the film provided and produced a proof of concept for The Mummy's effects in late 1997 to demonstrate the feasibility of Sommers' vision to executives. The filmmakers sought to make something faster and scarier for the title creature, using cutting-edge techniques to create something never before seen. ILM started developing the look of the Mummy three months before filming started. "We wanted to create a photorealistic corpse that was obviously not a man in a suit, obviously not an animatronic, and obviously alive," he recalled.

Over a months-long period, the designers worked on developing four distinct stages for the Mummy. Stage one was the mummy at its most decayed, with tattered bits of clothing, skin, and sinew hanging over a skeleton. Stage two added areas of regenerated skin, with stages three and four having the Mummy almost fully regenerated with only small areas of its innards showing through. The artists developed black-and-white sketches, then moved on to color treatments before building the creature in the computer; models were also made to use as reference for the digital artists. The initial states of the Mummy were created entirely by computer, while later stages combined live-action performance. To supplement prosthetics and makeups applied on set, LED lights and pieces of tape served as tracking points so that digital "cutouts" could be applied to Vosloo's face and body in postproduction; Vosloo remarked that walking around the set he felt like a Christmas tree.

The final creature was created with a combination of live-action acting with prosthetics and digital imagery. A digital representation of the Mummy was created in Alias, featuring simulated muscles for much of the body attached to a skeleton. The animators controlled parts of the Mummy via procedural animation; animating the underlying bones in turn controlled the stretch and movement of the overlaid muscles. Finally, layered on top of the procedural animation and motion capture was additional animation to tweak the performance; given the limitations of the technology, subtle movements like facial or hand animations had to be done by hand. Shots that featured Vosloo with overlaid computer-generated prosthetics were the most difficult for the effects team, requiring careful match moving. Rather than using a stunt performer, Vosloo performed the motion capture for the character himself. Scenes were blocked out and performed on set during principal photography (first with Vosloo in the scene, then without). The shots were then replicated in the motion capture studio, with Vosloo's performance recorded by eight cameras from different angles.

In addition to the Mummy, the script called for numerous effects shots to magnify the sweeping adventure of the film. Vistas like a flashback shot of the ancient city of Thebes combined location footage shot in the desert with composited actors shot on green screen, model miniatures, matte paintings, and computer-generated effects. The plagues Imhotep unleashes were accomplished using particle-based computer graphics, with ILM designers swapping out models of different qualities depending on how far from the camera the swarming "insects" were. While the film made extensive use of computer-generated imagery, many scenes, including ones where Rachel Weisz's character is covered with rats and locusts, were shot using live animals. Another close-up shot used footage of anesthetized locusts attached to a stunt performer combined with extra computer-generated pests. Sandstorms used procedural graphics based on programs used to create tornados in Twister, while the masses of flesh-eating scarabs used techniques developed for Star Wars: Episode I – The Phantom Menace. A shot of a firestorm engulfing Cairo combined real palm trees, physical models, and matte paintings with computer-generated hail, fire, and rubble. Pacific Title/Mirage also enhanced shots with digital camera shake.

The finale involves an army of mummies coming to Imhotep's defense. Many of these mummies were created by Make-Up Effects Supervisor Nick Dudman, who produced makeup, prosthetics, and animatronic effects in the film. Each suit came with variations for stunt moves or pyrotechnics. After principal photography, the suits were sent to ILM to scan and be modeled in the computer. Using parts of the Imhotep mummy to save time, ILM recreated the underlings digitally to add into the scenes and used motion capture to animate them. The animators credited Fraser's ability to consistently re-enact his movements in multiple takes as saving time when it came to match the motion-captured digital mummies to the live-action fight scenes.

== Music ==
The score for The Mummy was composed and conducted by Jerry Goldsmith, with orchestrations provided by Alexander Courage. Goldsmith had previously scored Deep Rising for Sommers. As he reached the final few years of his career, Goldsmith was coming off a number of action and adventure films in the 1990s, from multiple Star Trek films to Air Force One (1997). Goldsmith provided The Mummy with suitably bombastic music, with the traditional European orchestra supplemented with regional instruments such as the bouzouki.

The opening of the film contains nearly all of Goldsmith's major themes for the score, with what music critic Jeff Bond calls an "Egyptian theme" reused in different configurations throughout to establish the epic settings and sense of place for Hamunaptra; a theme for Imhotep/the Mummy that is performed in an understated manner early in the film, before repeating in more forceful, brassy renditions after the Mummy has regenerated; a love theme used for both Imhotep/Anck-su-namun and Rick/Evelyn; and a heroic theme for Rick. In addition to the extensive brass and percussion elements, the score uses sparing amounts of vocals, unusual for much of Goldsmith's work.

The soundtrack was released by Decca Records on May 4, 1999. Overall, Goldsmith's score was well received. AllMusic described it as a "grand, melodramatic score" which delivered the expected highlights. Other reviews positively noted the dark, percussive sound meshed well with the plot, as well as the raw power of the music. The limited but masterful use of the chorus was also lauded, and most critics found the final track on the CD to be the best overall. On the other hand, some critics found the score lacked cohesion, and that the constant heavy action lent itself to annoying repetition. Roderick Scott off CineMusic.net summed up the score as "representative of both Goldsmith's absolute best and his most mediocre. Thankfully [...] his favourable work on this release wins out."

== Release ==
Test audiences reacted poorly to the film's title, which conjured up negative impressions of an old horror film, but domestic marketing president Marc Shmuger recalled that they decided "we would redefine the myth with the film" rather than change the title. Enthusiasm for the film was low, but Universal took out a television spot for the Super Bowl (reportedly costing $1.6 million) that Sommers recalled immediately reversed the discussion of the film's prospects. The producers were concerned that the imminent release of The Phantom Menace would sink the film's box office fortunes, resulting in them moving the release date from May 21 to 7.

=== Home media ===
The Mummy was released on home video in VHS and DVD formats on September 28, 1999. The film was a tremendous success for Universal on home video, selling 7 million units on VHS and 1 million on DVD, making it the year's best-selling live-action VHS and second best-selling DVD (behind The Matrix). The Mummy's performance helped Universal gross over $1 billion in home video sales. On April 24, 2001, a two-disc Ultimate Edition DVD of the film premiered to coincide with the release of The Mummy Returns. The film was later digitally remastered and received a Blu-ray release in 2008. It was subsequently re-released on 4K Ultra HD in 2017 as both a stand-alone film and in a trilogy pack with its sequels.

== Reception ==
=== Box office ===
The Mummy was the number one film in the United States and Canada on its opening weekend, grossing $43 million in 3,210 theaters. Its weekend take was the highest non-holiday May opening, and ninth-biggest opening of all time. The film later fell to second place behind The Phantom Menace. The Mummy grossed over $155.4 million in the United States and Canada and $261 million internationally, grossing over $418.1 million worldwide.

=== Critical response ===
The Mummy received mixed reviews from critics. On Rotten Tomatoes, the film holds an approval rating of 64% based on 107 reviews, and an average rating of 6.5/10. The website's consensus reads: "It's difficult to make a persuasive argument for The Mummy as any kind of meaningful cinematic achievement, but it's undeniably fun to watch." On Metacritic, the film has a score of 49 out of 100 based on 35 critics, indicating mixed or average reviews. Audiences polled by CinemaScore gave the film an average grade of "B" on an A+ to F scale.

Roger Ebert of the Chicago Sun-Times gave the film a positive review, writing, "There is hardly a thing I can say in its favor, except that I was cheered by nearly every minute of it. I cannot argue for the script, the direction, the acting or even the mummy, but I can say that I was not bored and sometimes I was unreasonably pleased." Critics such as Entertainment Weekly's Owen Gleiberman and The New York Times' Stephen Holden concurred with the sentiment of the film as a breezy crowd-pleaser.

Less positively, Keith Phipps of The A.V. Club wrote that the film's attempt to create a big, Indiana Jones-inspired action film felt "forced" and the result was unsatisfying. Other reviews complained of an overstuffed plot or recycled elements from better movies. Reviewers comparing the film to the 1932 original sometimes favored the original's focus on atmosphere and dread, though others welcomed the change to a more energetic Indiana Jones-type film.

The effects were generally praised, especially the title creature. Ernest Larson's review for Jump Cut felt that the effects were too similar to ILM's other work, and that the effects alone could not support the weight of the rest of the movie. Bob Graham of the San Francisco Chronicle and Hal Hinson from the Dallas Observer agreed that the effects never overshadowed the human aspects of the film. Gleiberman said that the horrors of the effects were undercut by the lightheartedness of the film, while the BBC's Almar Haflidason felt that the effects were occasionally unconvincing, and the heavy reliance on cutting-edge computer-generated imagery would likely date the film heavily as time passed.

Critics generally praised the acting, with Haflidason writing that the efforts of the cast sold material that would otherwise have been cheesy. David Hunter of The Hollywood Reporter wrote that all the actors managed to hold their own amid the special effects, although he felt Vosloo was largely wasted after Imhotep regenerates and the screenplay gives him little to do. Reviews from USA Today, the British Film Institute, and The A.V. Club said the film featured questionable casting of ethnic roles and occasionally traded in stereotypes of Arabs.

=== Accolades ===
Award	Category	Recipient	Result	Ref.
Academy Awards	Best Sound	Leslie Shatz, Chris Carpenter, Rick Kline, and Chris Munro	Nominated	
British Academy Film Awards	Best Special Visual Effects	John Berton, Daniel Jeannette, Ben Snow, and Chris Corbould	Nominated	
Blockbuster Entertainment Awards	Favorite Actor – Action	Brendan Fraser	Nominated	
Blockbuster Entertainment Awards	Favorite Actress – Action	Rachel Weisz	Nominated	
Blockbuster Entertainment Awards	Favorite Supporting Actor – Action	John Hannah	Nominated	
Blockbuster Entertainment Awards	Favorite Villain	Arnold Vosloo	Nominated	
BMI Film & TV Awards	BMI Film Music Award	Jerry Goldsmith	Won	
MTV Movie & TV Awards	Best Action Sequence	Sand monster scene	Nominated	
Saturn Awards	Best Fantasy Film		Nominated	
Saturn Awards	Best Director	Stephen Sommers	Nominated	
Saturn Awards	Best Writing	Stephen Sommers	Nominated	
Saturn Awards	Best Actor	Brendan Fraser	Nominated	
Saturn Awards	Best Actress	Rachel Weisz	Nominated	
Saturn Awards	Best Music	Jerry Goldsmith	Nominated	
Saturn Awards	Best Costume Design	John Bloomfield	Nominated	
Saturn Awards	Best Make-up	Nick Dudman and Aileen Seaton	Won	
Saturn Awards	Best Special Effects	John Berton, Daniel Jeannette, Ben Snow, and Chris Corbould	Nominated	

== Legacy ==
=== Retrospective reviews ===
In 2019, when writing to commemorate the twentieth anniversary of the film's release, writer Maria Lewis said that on paper, The Mummy should not have been a success, as yet another period adventure film coming after a decade of failed period adventure films. Its connection with audiences, if not critics, was down to its successful blend of "heart, [humor], and heroics … along with a fourth h — horror." She declared it the "pivotal blockbuster of the nineties." Emma Stefansky, writing for Thrillist, said it was "the beginning of the end" for action-adventure films, as superhero films would soon supplant it in the coming years. Rotten Tomatoes called the film "Indiana Jones for a new generation." Reviewers felt Fraser's portrayal of Rick set a new mold for action heroes that more films would follow in the years after, while Stefansky considered Evelyn a character allowed to break free from a traditional damsel in distress role. Retrospective overviews published by Complex and Syfy described the film as a classic action film, generating retrospective praise for Brendan Fraser's portrayal of Rick O'Connell.

== Franchise ==
=== Sequels ===
The Mummy's box office performance led to numerous sequels and spinoffs. The film sequel The Mummy Returns (2001) features most of the surviving principal characters. As a married couple, Rick and Evelyn confront Imhotep and the Scorpion King. The film also introduces the heroes' son, Alex. A second sequel, The Mummy: Tomb of the Dragon Emperor (2008), takes place in China with the Terracotta Emperor inspiring the villain, and Rachel Weisz replaced with Maria Bello. A fourth film titled The Mummy: Book of the Dead with Fraser and Weisz reprising their roles is in development, and is set to be directed by Matt Bettinelli-Olpin and Tyler Gillett of Radio Silence Productions. It is scheduled for release in 2027.

=== Television series ===
The films inspired an animated TV series titled The Mummy, which lasted two seasons.

=== Spin-off ===
A spin-off prequel, The Scorpion King (2002).

=== Reboot ===
A reboot of the franchise, also titled The Mummy, was released in June 2017 to poor critical and box office performance.

== Other media ==
=== Video games ===
Developer Konami Nagoya published two video game adaptations of The Mummy under license from Universal Interactive Studios, in 2000: an action-adventure game for the PlayStation and Microsoft Windows developed by Rebellion Developments, as well as a Game Boy Color puzzle game. There was also a 2002 video game based on the 2001 animated series, published by Ubisoft for Game Boy Advance.

=== Roller coaster ===
The film also inspired a roller coaster, Revenge of the Mummy, found in three Universal Studios Theme Parks: Hollywood, California; Orlando, Florida; and Sentosa, Singapore.

=== Other appearances ===
Characters of the film are featured in Funko Fusion, released in 2024.
