= Sean Daniel =

American film producer

- Born: Sean Peter Daniel; August 15, 1951 (age 75); New York City, New York, U.S.
- Education: High School of Music & Art; California Institute of the Arts
- Occupations: Film producer, film executive
- Spouse: Ruth Hunter

Sean Peter Daniel (born August 15, 1951) is an American film producer and movie executive.

== Life and career ==
Born to a Jewish family, Daniel attended Manhattan's High School of Music & Art, graduating in 1969. He received a Bachelor of Fine Arts in film from the California Institute of the Arts in 1973.

=== Early career ===
In 1976, he joined Universal Pictures as a film production executive, and in 1985, at age 34, he became the youngest production president in the studio's history. He has built a nearly 50-year career in the entertainment industry. As a producer and studio executive, Daniel has helped shape the vernacular of modern cinema, overseeing some of the most beloved, critically acclaimed films ever made. During his tenure, Daniel supervised the financing and production of such acclaimed National Lampoon's Animal House, Coal Miner's Daughter, The Blues Brothers, The Breakfast Club, Sixteen Candles, Fast Times at Ridgemont High, Brazil, Field of Dreams, Do the Right Thing, Back to the Future, Midnight Run, Born on the Fourth of July, Missing, Weird Science, Uncle Buck, The Great Outdoors, Born in East L.A., Fletch, Rumble Fish, Gorillas in the Mist, Darkman, and Monty Python's The Meaning of Life.

=== Independent producer ===
The logo of Alphaville

Following his tenure as an executive at the studio, Daniel left for The Geffen Film Company before abruptly leaving, and returned to Universal to form its first independent company, The Sean Daniel Company, in late 1989 at Universal Pictures, and in 1992, Daniel started Alphaville Films with James Jacks, which supplanted the first Sean Daniel Company, and developed and produced 1999's blockbuster action-adventure Mummy, starring future Academy Award winners Brendan Fraser and Rachel Weisz. Daniel produced the four subsequent films in the global franchise: The Mummy Returns, which launched the film career of Dwayne Johnson, The Mummy: Tomb of the Dragon Emperor, and The Scorpion King and Mummy. All told, the franchise has earned almost $2 billion worldwide. In 2006, Daniel and Jacks ended their partnership and reinstated The Sean Daniel Company in 2006.

Daniel also produced Malcolm D. Lee's hit romantic comedy The Best Man Holiday, the Richard Linklater classic Dazed and Confused, the renowned western Tombstone, Nora Ephron's supernatural comedy Michael, the Coen Brothers' film Intolerable Cruelty, the Chris Rock, Chris Weitz and Paul Weitz comedy Down to Earth, the rap-music comedy CB4, also with Chris Rock, and John Woo's first American film, Hard Target.

The logo of Hivemind

In 2018, Daniel and other partners formed a new company, Hivemind (formerly Mythos), which supplanted the former Sean Daniel Company.

Daniel's recent credits include Scary Stories to Tell in the Dark, which he produced with Guillermo Del Toro, Richard Linklater's feature Everybody Wants Some!!, and the documentary Belushi.

He has served as an executive producer on Netflix's phenomenon The Witcher, Peacock's The Best Man: The Final Chapters, the acclaimed Amazon Prime Video series The Expanse, based on James S.A. Corey's The New York Times best-selling book franchise, and Graceland, from White Collar creator Jeff Eastin. He executive produced the TNT original film Freedom Song, directed by Phil Alden Robinson and starring Danny Glover, HBO's Everyday People, and the USA Network four-hour miniseries Attila, starring Gerard Butler.

== Selected filmography ==
He was a producer in all films unless otherwise noted.

=== Film ===
Year	Film	Credit	Notes
1991	Pure Luck		
1992	American Me		
1993	CB4	Executive producer	
1993	Dazed and Confused		
1993	Heart and Souls		
1993	Hard Target		
1993	Tombstone		
1995	Village of the Damned	Co-executive producer	
1995	Mallrats		
1996	Michael		
1997	The Jackal		
1999	The Mummy		
2000	Lucky Numbers		
2000	The Gift	Executive producer	
2001	Down to Earth		
2001	The Mummy Returns		
2001	Pootie Tang	Executive producer	
2001	Rat Race		
2002	The Scorpion King		
2002	Dark Blue		
2003	The Hunted	Executive producer	
2003	Intolerable Cruelty	Executive producer	
2004	Alfie	Executive producer	
2008	The Mummy: Tomb of the Dragon Emperor		
2008	The Scorpion King 2: Rise of a Warrior		Direct-to-video
2010	The Wolfman		
2012	The Scorpion King 3: Battle for Redemption	Executive producer	Direct-to-video
2013	The Best Man Holiday		
2015	The Scorpion King 4: Quest for Power	Executive producer	Direct-to-video
2016	Everybody Wants Some!!	Executive producer	
2016	Ben-Hur		
2016	Hard Target 2	Executive producer	Direct-to-video
2017	The Mummy		
2018	The Scorpion King: Book of Souls	Executive producer	Direct-to-video
2019	Scary Stories to Tell in the Dark		
2021	The Witcher: Nightmare of the Wolf	Executive producer	
2027	The Mummy: Book of the Dead		

Production manager

Year	Film	Role	Notes
1978	Animal House	Executive in charge of production	Uncredited
1980	Coal Miner's Daughter	Executive in charge of production	Uncredited
1982	Missing	Executive in charge of production	Uncredited
1985	The Breakfast Club	Executive in charge of production	Uncredited
1985	Back to the Future	Executive in charge of production	Uncredited
1985	Brazil	Executive in charge of production	Uncredited
1985	Fletch	Executive in charge of production	Uncredited
1989	Do the Right Thing	Executive in charge of production	Uncredited
1989	Field of Dreams	Executive in charge of production	Uncredited

As an actor

Year	Film	Role
1985	Spies Like Us	Ace Tomato Driver
1990	Darkman	Policeman #2

Thanks

Year	Film	Role
1995	Mallrats	The director would like to thank: For bringing a pedigree to the project
1998	A Simple Plan	Thanks

=== Television ===
Year	Title	Credit	Notes
1996	Don't Look Back	Executive producer	Television film
2000	Freedom Song	Executive producer	Television film
2001	Attila	Executive producer	
2004	Everyday People	Executive producer	Television film
2013−15	Graceland		
2015−2022	The Expanse	Executive producer	
2019	The Witcher	Executive producer	
2022	The Witcher: Blood Origin	Executive producer	
