= Rat Race (film) =

2001 film by Jerry Zucker

- Theatrical release poster
- Directed by: Jerry Zucker
- Written by: Andy Breckman
- Produced by: Jerry Zucker; Janet Zucker; Sean Daniel
- Starring: Rowan Atkinson; John Cleese; Whoopi Goldberg; Cuba Gooding Jr; Seth Green; Jon Lovitz; Breckin Meyer; Kathy Najimy; Amy Smart
- Cinematography: Thomas E. Ackerman
- Edited by: Tom Lewis
- Music by: John Powell
- Production companies: Alphaville Films; Zucker Productions
- Distributed by: Paramount Pictures (North America); Fireworks Pictures (International)
- Release date: August 17, 2001 (United States)
- Running time: 112 minutes
- Countries: United States; Canada
- Language: English
- Budget: $48 million
- Box office: $85.5 million

Rat Race is a 2001 comedy film directed by Jerry Zucker and written by Andy Breckman. Inspired by Stanley Kramer's 1963 film It's a Mad, Mad, Mad, Mad World, the film features an ensemble cast consisting of Rowan Atkinson, John Cleese, Whoopi Goldberg, Cuba Gooding Jr., Wayne Knight, Jon Lovitz, Kathy Najimy, Lanei Chapman, Breckin Meyer, Amy Smart, Seth Green, Vince Vieluf and Dave Thomas.

In the film, six teams of people are given the task of racing from a casino in Las Vegas to a train station in Silver City, New Mexico, where a storage locker contains a duffel bag filled with $2 million. Each team is given a key to the locker, and the first person to reach the locker wins and gets to keep the money.

Produced by Alphaville Films, and Zucker Productions, Rat Race was released theatrically by Paramount Pictures and Fireworks Pictures on August 17, 2001 in the United States and Canada. Despite receiving mixed reviews from critics, the film was a box office success, having grossed $85.5 million worldwide against a $48 million budget.

== Plot ==
Hotel tycoon Donald Sinclair devises a game to entertain the high rollers who visit his Las Vegas casino: six competitors are to race to Silver City, New Mexico, where $2 million is inside a duffel bag in a train station locker. The racers consist of ne'er-do-well brothers Duane and Blaine Cody; businesswoman Merrill Jennings and her mother Vera; disgraced football referee Owen Templeton; tourist Randy Pear and his family; narcoleptic Italian tourist Enrico Pollini; and no-nonsense attorney Nick Schaffer.

Duane and Blaine destroy the airport's radar, which grounds everybody else but wrecks their vehicle in the process, prompting them to rent another. They decide to split up to better their chances and have a locksmith create a duplicate locker key, but the locksmith overhears their plan and makes off with the key in a hot air balloon. The brothers catch up to the locksmith, leaving him and a stray cow hanging from the balloon's anchor rope. After Blaine gets distracted by two women driving beside them on the road, he and Duane veer off into a monster truck rally, where they steal one of the trucks after their rental car is crushed.

Merrill and Vera are given malicious directions by a woman selling squirrels on the side of the road, and crash into a pile of totaled vehicles with the skeletons of her previous victims. After stumbling through the Mojave Desert, they hijack a rocket car until it runs out of fuel. Left nauseous by the car's extreme speed, Merrill and Vera accidentally stumble onto a busload of mental patients headed for Silver City.

Owen has his pants and other belongings stolen by a taxi driver as revenge for a bad call Owen previously made at a football game, which caused the driver to lose a bet. Stumbling across a bus station, he dupes and impersonates the driver of a bus on the way to transport a group of Lucille Ball cosplayers to an I Love Lucy fan convention. On the way to the convention, Owen accidentally hits the cow dangling from the hot air balloon and crashes the bus. After revealing he is not the real driver and escaping from the cosplayers, Owen steals a horse.

Randy forces his daughter Kimberly to defecate out of their minivan's window to avoid stopping; as revenge, she insists they visit a museum dedicated to Nazi officer Klaus Barbie, mistakenly believing it to be about Barbie dolls. The family steals Adolf Hitler's staff car after seeing their minivan sabotaged by Duane and Blaine, only to be confronted by an all-female biker gang. Randy drives his family into a large gathering for World War II veterans after his tongue is accidentally burnt by the dashboard cigarette lighter, where the veterans are put off by his Hitler-like slurred speech and appearance. Later, at a diner where his family insists they end the trip, Randy slips sleeping pills into their milkshakes and packs them into a semi-trailer truck.

Nick initially decides not to participate, but changes his mind when he meets Tracy, a pilot who offers him a lift in her helicopter. On the way, Tracy decides to visit her boyfriend Shawn, only to catch him cheating on her with another woman in his backyard. After attacking and chasing Shawn into the desert, Tracy and Nick steal Shawn's pickup truck after their helicopter runs out of fuel.

Enrico sleeps while standing up in the hotel lobby, and wakes up hours later. He gets a ride from Zack, an ambulance driver delivering a transplant heart to El Paso who offers Enrico a lift to avoid being sued by Gloria Allred, who witnessed Zack hitting Enrico with his van. On the way, Enrico accidentally drops the heart out of the window and it is stolen by a stray dog, which then gets electrocuted by an electric fence. Deeming the heart unusable, Zack decides to kill Enrico to replace the missing heart, but Enrico escapes by jumping onto a passing train, where he drops his locker key in a baby's diaper and is mistaken for a pedophile by the parents while retrieving it. He gets thrown out at the Silver City station and becomes the first racer to reach the locker, only to fall asleep before opening it.

The other racers arrive in Silver City and fight to open the locker, only to find it empty. Outside, Sinclair's assistant Harold Grisham and call girl Vicki run off with the money, but the locksmith appears and maneuvers the balloon to drop the cow on Grisham and Vicki. The balloon then flies into a Smash Mouth charity concert, where the band and crowd mistake the money for a donation. When the racers see what a global difference they could make, they have a change of heart and donate all the money. When Sinclair and his patrons arrive, Nick horrifies them by announcing they will match the money raised. The racers celebrate with the band by dancing and crowd surfing while a distraught Sinclair sees the total donations shooting past $19 million.

== Cast ==
=== Main ===
- John Cleese as Donald P. Sinclair, an eccentric Las Vegas billionaire and gambling mastermind. (Donald Sinclair was the name of the former joint owner of the Gleneagles Hotel, Torquay and provided the inspiration for the eccentric Basil Fawlty (John Cleese), joint owner of the fictional Torquay hotel Fawlty Towers).
- Breckin Meyer as Nicholas "Nick" Schaffer, a strait-laced young attorney
- Amy Smart as Tracy Faucet, an experienced helicopter pilot and Nick's love interest
- Cuba Gooding Jr. as Owen Templeton, a disgraced football referee, recently infamous for a bad call on account of bad judgement
- Seth Green as Duane Cody, a ne'er do well looking to make money off insurance scams
- Vince Vieluf as Blaine Cody, Duane's brother who is unintelligible due to an infected tongue piercing
- Whoopi Goldberg as Vera Baker, Merrill's superstitious mother, who gave Merrill up for adoption and is now reuniting with her
- Lanai Chapman as Merrill Jennings, Vera's biological daughter, a high-strung businesswoman with anger issues
- Jon Lovitz as Randy Pear, a sneaky, irresponsible and recklessly opportunist tourist
- Kathy Najimy as Beverly "Bev" Pear, Randy's wife
- Brody Smith as Jason Pear, Randy and Bev's older son
- Jillian Marie Hubert as Kimberly Pear, Randy and Bev's younger daughter
- Rowan Atkinson as Enrico Pollini, a simple-minded, narcoleptic Italian tourist from Naples
- Dave Thomas as Harold Grisham, Sinclair's attorney who was tragically born without a personality
- Wayne Knight as Zack Mallozzi, a medical supply driver
- Silas Weir Mitchell as Lloyd, a locksmith
- Paul Rodriguez as Gus, a taxi driver
- Dean Cain as Shawn Kent, Tracy's cheating boyfriend
- Brandy Ledford as Vicki, a call girl
- Tristin Leffler as Pierced Girl, Blaine's girlfriend

=== Minor ===
- Colleen Camp as Rainbow House Nurse
- Deborah Theaker as one of the Lucille Ball cosplayers
- Charlotte Zucker as an elderly Lucille Ball cosplayer
- Rance Howard as Feed the Earth spokesman
- Gloria Allred as herself
- Smash Mouth as themselves
- Kathy Bates (uncredited) as a roadside squirrel seller
- Kevin Rothery as an air traffic controller
- Diamond Dallas Page and Kimberly Page (deleted scenes) as themselves
- Manoj Sood as a Saudi high roller
- Lucy Lee Flippin as Feed the Earth spokesperson

Fox Sports commentators

- Chris Myers as himself
- Kevin Frazier as himself

== Production ==
=== Development ===
Rat Race was written by Darryl Quarles as a spec script in November 1998. In February 1999, the script had been sold to Hollywood Pictures and producer Jerry Bruckheimer. In August 1999, Jerry Zucker was in negotiations to direct the film for Paramount Pictures from a screenplay written by Andy Breckman that would be set in Las Vegas, Nevada and in New Mexico.

Paramount hoped to begin production at the end of 1999 or the beginning of 2000. Jerry and Janet Zucker were set to produce the film alongside Sean Daniel, while Daniel's partner in Alphaville Films, James Jacks, would serve as executive producer. The filmmakers initially considered having the race take place from Las Vegas, Nevada to Las Vegas, New Mexico, but the idea was rejected following concerns that it might confuse viewers.

In January 2000, Las Vegas, Nevada was confirmed as a filming location for Rat Race. Location scouting in southern Nevada was scheduled for May 2000, while filming in the area was delayed until the fall of 2000 to avoid shooting the film in one hundred degree summer heat. Breckin Meyer and Amy Smart were cast in the film in June 2000, while Dean Cain also joined the cast in October. Actor John Cleese praised the script as one of only two scripts during his career that he enjoyed: "It's so unusual to get a top class script. Twice in my life I've had the experience of reading a script and simply saying, 'I'm going to do this.'"

=== Filming ===
Filming began in Calgary, Alberta, Canada in August 2000. Filming took place primarily along Calgary's highways, which stood in as highways that the characters travel on in Nevada, Arizona, and New Mexico. Desert scenes were shot in the Canadian town of Drumheller. Second unit filming began in Las Vegas on August 7, 2000, with scenes primarily involving Cuba Gooding Jr.. Scheduled filming locations included the Las Vegas Strip, Tropicana Avenue (east of the Las Vegas Strip), McCarran International Airport, and Nevada State Route 159. Other scheduled filming locations in Nevada included Goodsprings and Sandy Valley.

The scenes involving Gooding and the group of Lucy cosplayers were shot in the Canadian Rockies. Jerry Zucker, who had a tradition of including his mother Charlotte in each of his films beginning with Airplane!, had her portray one of the Lucy cosplayers. Jerry Zucker said, "It's like the Alfred Hitchcock signature. Instead of me, it's mom." Filming also took place at Calgary's former Currie Barracks military base, which had been converted to accommodate film and television productions. Sound stages were constructed inside two aircraft hangars at the base to be used for many of the film's interior scenes, including the Venetian's hotel rooms and conference room. Driving scenes, using green screens and rear projection effects, were also shot inside the hangars. The scene with the coin toss by Owen Templeton was filmed at Calgary's McMahon Stadium during a game on September 4.

Filming returned to Las Vegas for a nine-day period beginning on September 20, 2000, with the first three days spent at the McCarran International Airport, before moving to the Venetian resort on the Las Vegas Strip for a six-day shoot. Venetian officials negotiated with Paramount for six months to use the resort in the film. Scenes were shot throughout the Venetian, with the exception of its hotel rooms. Venetian scenes included the casino, lobby, and the entrance to its valet parking garage, as well as exterior shots of the resort. Approximately 1,000 background extras were needed during the second Las Vegas shoot. On September 25, 2000, second unit filming took place along Nevada State Route 161, leading to Goodsprings.

Filming in Las Vegas concluded on September 29, 2000, and production moved to Ely, Nevada, which stood in as Silver City, New Mexico. Ely's Nevada Northern Railway Museum stood in as the Silver City train station. According to the Nevada Film Office, the filmmakers "fell in love" with the museum after being shown pictures of it. As a result, the initial two day shoot in Ely was extended to six days. Ely's western entrance, accessed from U.S. Route 50, was used as the entrance to Silver City. After concluding in Ely, production crews relocated to southern California for the final six weeks of filming, mainly for exterior scenes. California filming primarily occurred in Antelope Valley, Palmdale, Acton, Santa Clarita and Newhall. Rosamond, California was also a primary location, with filming occurring during a three-week period in October 2000. Smart's helicopter scenes were filmed at 3118 Carnation Street in Rosamond. Additional filming in California occurred at Big Sky Ranch and El Mirage Lake.

Sinclair and the gamblers' eccentric habits are further exaggerated in deleted scenes, where they partake in many more ridiculous bets, including playing Monopoly with real money. In another scene, a high roller pretends to find what they are doing immoral. Professional wrestler Diamond Dallas Page and his then-wife Kimberly made a cameo appearance that was cut when audiences did not react to his appearance in test screenings. However, the scene is available on the film's DVD release.

== Reception ==
=== Box office ===
Rat Race was released in both the United States and Canada on August 17, 2001, and grossed US$11,662,094 in its opening weekend at the North American box office, ranking third behind American Pie 2 and Rush Hour 2. The film ultimately grossed $56.6 million domestically and $28.8 million overseas for a worldwide total of approximately $85.5 million based on a budget of an estimated $48 million, making it commercially successful.

The film was released in the United Kingdom on January 11, 2002, and opened also at number three behind the non-comedic The Lord of the Rings: The Fellowship of the Ring and Harry Potter and the Philosopher's Stone. For the next two weekends, the film retained the spot, before moving down one place and then four places down before finally ending up on No. 10 on February 10, 2002.

=== Critical response ===
On review aggregator Rotten Tomatoes, the film holds an approval rating of 44% based on 129 reviews, with an average rating of 5.4/10. The website's critical consensus reads, "Rat Race moves from one sight gag to another, but only a handful of them are genuinely funny." On Metacritic, the film received a score of 52 based on 26 reviews, indicating "mixed or average reviews". Audiences polled by CinemaScore gave the film an above average grade of "B+" on an A+ to F scale.

Jo Berry of Empire gave the film three stars out of five, writing "Ex–Saturday Night Live writer [Andy] Breckman piles on the gags for this daft chase movie. It's incredibly silly, but also rib-ticklingly funny."

== See also ==
- List of films set in Las Vegas
- Around the World in 80 Days
- It's a Mad, Mad, Mad, Mad World
- The Great Race
- The Gumball Rally
- Scavenger Hunt
- Midnight Madness
- The Cannonball Run
- Million Dollar Mystery
- The Amazing Race
- Dhamaal
- Wacky Races
