= James Jacks =

American film producer (1947–2014)

- Born: December 29, 1947; United States
- Died: January 20, 2014 (aged 66); Los Angeles, California, U.S.
- Resting place: Forest Lawn Memorial Park (Hollywood Hills)
- Education: Carnegie Mellon University (BS); Cornell University (MBA)
- Occupation: Film producer

James "Jim" Jacks (December 29, 1947 – January 20, 2014) was an American film producer, having produced the first Hollywood films of Richard Linklater, Joel and Ethan Coen (the Coen Brothers), and Kevin Smith.

Born December 29, 1947, Jacks grew up in a military family. He graduated from Carnegie Mellon University with a B.S. in Industrial Engineering and from Cornell University with an MBA. He was working as a Wall Street financial analyst when he decided to be a screenwriter. Unsuccessful, he became head of production at Circle Films in the early- to mid-1980s and then senior vice-president of production at Universal Studios from the late-1980s into the early-1990s. In 1992, he became an independent producer with Alphaville Films, which he co-founded with Sean Daniel as a retooling of Daniel's former self-named production company. He left Alphaville Films in 2006 and formed Frelaine Productions.

Jacks died on January 20, 2014, of a heart attack at his Los Angeles home at the age of 66.

== Selected filmography ==
He was a producer in all films unless otherwise noted.

=== Film ===
Year	Film	Credit	Notes	Other notes
1987	Raising Arizona	Executive producer		
1993	Dazed and Confused			
1993	Heart and Souls	Executive producer		
1993	Hard Target			
1993	Tombstone			
1995	Village of the Damned	Co-executive producer		
1995	Mallrats			
1996	Michael			
1997	The Jackal			
1998	A Simple Plan			
1999	The Mummy			
2000	The Gift			
2001	Down to Earth			
2001	The Mummy Returns			
2001	Rat Race	Executive producer		
2002	The Scorpion King			
2002	Dark Blue			
2003	The Hunted			
2003	Intolerable Cruelty	Executive producer		
2008	The Mummy: Tomb of the Dragon Emperor			
2008	The Scorpion King 2: Rise of a Warrior		Direct-to-video	
2012	The Scorpion King 3: Battle for Redemption	Executive producer	Direct-to-video	
2015	The Scorpion King 4: Quest for Power	Executive producer	Direct-to-video	Posthumous release
2018	The Scorpion King: Book of Souls	Executive producer	Direct-to-video	Posthumous release Final film

Thanks

Year	Film	Role
1995	Mallrats	The director would like to thank: For treating us like the Coens as opposed to the twenty-something know-nothings we really are
2000	Attention Shoppers	Special thanks
2016	Everybody Wants Some!!	In remembrance: A guy who loved movies

=== Television ===
Year	Title	Credit	Notes
1996	Don't Look Back	Executive producer	Television film
2001	Attila	Executive producer	
