= Dark Blue (film) =

2002 film by Ron Shelton

- Theatrical release poster
- Directed by: Ron Shelton
- Written by: David Ayer
- Story by: James Ellroy
- Produced by: David Blocker; Caldecot Chubb; Sean Daniel; James Jacks
- Starring: Kurt Russell; Brendan Gleeson; Scott Speedman; Michael Michele; Lolita Davidovich; Ving Rhames
- Cinematography: Barry Peterson
- Edited by: Patrick Flannery; Paul Seydor
- Music by: Terence Blanchard
- Production companies: United Artists; Intermedia; Alphaville Films; Cosmic Pictures
- Distributed by: MGM Distribution Co.
- Release dates: December 21, 2002 (Noir in Festival); February 21, 2003 (United States)
- Running time: 118 minutes
- Country: United States
- Language: English
- Budget: $15 million
- Box office: $12.3 million

Dark Blue is a 2002 American neo-noir crime thriller film directed by Ron Shelton and written by David Ayer, based on a story written for film by crime novelist James Ellroy and takes place during the days leading up to the Rodney King trial verdict. The film stars Kurt Russell, with Scott Speedman, Ving Rhames and Brendan Gleeson in supporting roles.

The film received mixed reviews from critics.

== Plot ==
The film opens in Los Angeles, 1992. LAPD Sergeant Eldon Perry, who is pacing in a motel room with a shotgun and pistol. Throughout the film, the final days of the Rodney King Trial are cut in as they relate to the timeline of events.

Five days earlier, four people are killed and one wounded when two men, Darryl Orchard and Gary Sidwell, rob a convenience store in order to gain access to the office safe. Meanwhile, Perry defends his partner, Detective Bobby Keough, before an internal hearing concerning Keough's use of deadly force in a previous case; Keough is later exonerated. Perry and Keough later celebrate Perry's impending promotion with their superior (and Keough's uncle), Jack Van Meter. Van Meter, a corrupt cop who often encourages his subordinates to fabricate evidence, visits Orchard and Sidwell's house later that night and takes the money stolen from the safe, admonishing them for behaving recklessly during the robbery.

Van Meter assigns Perry and Keough to investigate the robbery, providing a false alibi for Orchard and Sidwell and telling them to pin the crime on someone else. Meanwhile, Assistant Chief Arthur Holland finds Perry's testimony at Keough's hearing suspicious, doubting that Keough killed the suspect as he was charged. His assistant, Beth Williamson, pulls files on the two men and sees that a man she previously had anonymous casual sex with is Keough.

After obtaining a search warrant using underhanded techniques, a SWAT team raids the house of the ex-cons who are to be Perry's fall guys. One of the men escapes and goes into a back alley but is caught by Perry and Keough. Under Perry's orders, Keough reluctantly kills the innocent man and is left visibly shaken. When Perry arrives home later, he learns that his wife Sally is leaving him. Meanwhile, Keough visits Williamson and admits to the killing, offering to testify against Perry on corruption. Seeing both Perry and the robbers as loose ends, Van Meter sets them up to kill each other just as the Los Angeles riots begin.

Believing that Perry was sent by Van Meter to kill Orchard and Sidwell, Keough and Williamson also drive to the robbers' address. While all three eventually meet up in the alleys, Keough is killed by Orchard and Sidwell. Williamson tearfully blames Perry for what happened. Perry calls in the incident, hesitating briefly before pursuing Orchard and Sidwell. As the riots unfold, Sidwell is dragged out of his car and beaten to death while Orchard is captured by Perry. Perry then heads to his promotion ceremony, where he confesses about the corruption, implicates Van Meter and volunteers himself to be arrested.

== Cast ==
- Kurt Russell as Sergeant Eldon Perry
- Scott Speedman as Detective Bobby Keough
- Michael Michele as Sergeant Beth Williamson
- Brendan Gleeson as Commander Jack Van Meter
- Ving Rhames as Assistant Chief Arthur Holland
- Master P as 'Maniac'
- Kurupt as Darryl Orchard
- Dash Mihok as Gary Sidwell
- Jonathan Banks as Deputy Chief Jimmy Barcomb
- Eloy Casados as SWAT Commander Rico
- Graham Beckel as Detective Peltz
- William Utay as Detective Sapin
- Lolita Davidovich as Sally Perry
- Chapman Way as Eldon Perry III
- Marin Hinkle as Assistant District Attorney Deena Schultz
- Khandi Alexander as Janelle Holland
- Dana Lee as Huan Henry Kim
- Eddie Mui as Lucky 7 Bartender
- Kaila Yu as Lucky 7 Stripper
- Faleolo Alailima as Lucky 7 Bouncer

== Production ==
In September 2000, it was announced Intermedia had acquired James Ellroy's The Plague Season for development. In February 2001, Kurt Russell had signed on to star in the film which would be directed by Ron Shelton from a re-write David Ayer performed of the initial Ellroy penned script. Ellroy had written the script back in 1993 specifically with Russell in mind for the lead. The following month, Ving Rhames was cast opposite Russell.

== Reception ==
=== Box office ===
On its opening weekend, the film debuted on 2,176 theaters and earned $3.9 million. At the end of its theatrical run, it grossed $9.2 million in the United States and Canada and $3 million internationally, accumulating $12.3 million worldwide.

=== Critical response ===
On Rotten Tomatoes, Dark Blue has an approval score of 58% based on 130 reviews, with an average rating of 5.90/10. The consensus reads, "Kurt Russell gives a good performance. Too bad there's nothing here that you haven't seen before." On Metacritic, the film has a score of 57 out of 100 based on 37 reviews, indicating "mixed or average" reviews. Audiences polled by CinemaScore gave the film an average grade of "C+" on an A+ to F scale.

William Arnold of The Seattle Post-Intelligencer gave the film a positive review. "Ron Shelton's Dark Blue is another harrowingly cynical dirty-cop movie in the recent tradition of Training Day and Narc. Yet it's so much more complex, engrossing and satisfying than those films that the comparison is not entirely fair...."

However, the film received a negative review from the L.A. Weekly, "Dark Blue is stuffed to the gills with blithely improbable coincidence and subsidiary story line... Shelton is a likable, generous director who's made two pretty good films (Blaze and Bull Durham), but it's not at all clear he has the chops to take on an action movie, let alone the intricacies of police politics — let alone the politics of race, about which he had more imaginative things to say in White Men Can't Jump."
