= Charlotte Zucker =

American actress (1921–2007)

- Born: Charlotte Ann Lefstein; March 10, 1921; New York City, U.S.
- Died: September 5, 2007 (aged 86); Shorewood, Wisconsin, U.S.
- Education: Brooklyn College; University of Wisconsin in Madison
- Occupation: Actress
- Years active: 1977–2003
- Spouse: Burton Zucker (m. 1941; her death 2007)
- Children: 3, including David Zucker and Jerry Zucker

Charlotte Ann Zucker (née Lefstein; March 10, 1921 – September 5, 2007) was an American actress. She was the mother of filmmakers David and Jerry Zucker, and appeared in many of their films.

== Early life and education ==
Zucker was born on March 10, 1921, and grew up in Manhattan. Her father, Harry Lefstein, was a tailor, and her mother, Sarah (née Seiden) was a housewife. She earned a degree in speech and theater at Brooklyn College, and appeared in stage performances at the Henry Street Neighborhood Playhouse. She then moved to Milwaukee to teach English at a junior high school. She graduated from the University of Wisconsin in Madison with a master's degree.

== Career ==
Zucker had appeared in community theater productions in Florida and in Shorewood, Wisconsin. She was a member of the Jewish Community Center Readers Theater-Milwaukee. She made her screen debut in The Kentucky Fried Movie (1977). She appeared in a total of 17 films, including Airplane!, Ghost (as the bank officer interacting with Whoopi Goldberg), First Knight and Rat Race, which were directed and produced by her sons, David and Jerry Zucker. She also appeared at the Second Avenue Theater, New York, reading selections from Molly Picon's autobiography.

== Personal life ==
From 1941 to her death in 2007, she was married to Burton Zucker, who was a real estate developer. She had three children, David, Jerry and Susan. On September 5, 2007, Zucker died from cancer in Shorewood, Wisconsin, aged 86. She was buried at Second Home Cemetery in Greenfield, Wisconsin.

== Filmography ==
=== Film ===
| Year | Title | Role | Notes |
|---|---|---|---|
| 1977 | The Kentucky Fried Movie | Jurist | |
| 1980 | Airplane! | Make-Up Lady | |
| 1984 | Top Secret! | Cafe Diner | |
| 1986 | Ruthless People | Judge | |
| 1988 | The Naked Gun: From the Files of Police Squad! | Dominique | |
| 1990 | Ghost | Bank Officer | |
| 1991 | The Naked Gun 2½: The Smell of Fear | "For a man in a wheelchair, he gets around marvelously." | |
| 1992 | Brain Donors | Woman with Program | |
| 1993 | My Life | Guest at Wedding | |
| 1994 | Naked Gun 33 1/3: The Final Insult | Medical Receptionist | |
| 1995 | First Knight | Bread Vendor | |
| 1996 | High School High | Woman Smoking Pipe | |
| 1997 | My Best Friend's Wedding | Customer | |
| 1998 | BASEketball | Surgery Nurse | |
| 2001 | Rat Race | Elderly Lucy | |
| 2002 | Unconditional Love | Restaurant Patron | |
| 2003 | My Boss's Daughter | Gertrude | Final film role |

=== Television ===
| Year | Title | Role | Notes |
|---|---|---|---|
| 2007 | MythBusters | Dominique | Archive footage from The Naked Gun; Television documentary series Episode: "Voice Flame Extinguisher" |
