= Jim Quinlan (writer) =

American journalist, writer, and screenwriter (1934–2020)

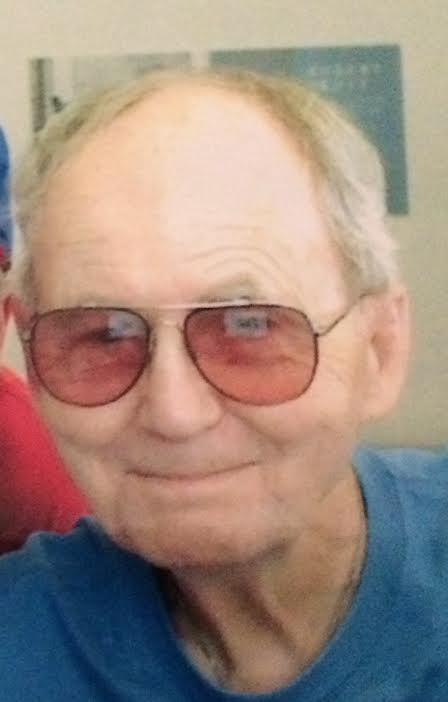
- Born: May 1, 1934; St. Louis, Missouri, United States
- Died: March 29, 2020 (aged 85); Bradenton, Florida, United States
- Occupation: Journalist, screenwriter, writer
- Genre: Fiction

James Maurice Quinlan (May 1, 1934 – March 29, 2020) was an American journalist, writer and screenwriter. Quinlan wrote the screenplay for the 1996 movie Michael starring John Travolta.

== Biography ==
Jim Quinlan was born and raised in St. Louis, Missouri. His father was a bank examiner; he also lived with his mother and his sister. In 1949, he moved to Chicago and attended Fenwick High School. He also competed in the Chicago Golden Gloves boxing tournament. Later, he attended Loyola University Chicago, where he graduated in 1957. In 1969, he moved to North Palm Beach where he worked for the Palm Beach Times, and later the Palm Beach Post; he became the city editor of the latter in 1977 after a successful human interest column. In 1980 he moved back to Chicago where he worked at the Chicago Sun-Times. Quinlan also worked for the Philadelphia Daily News and the Albuquerque Journal for short periods, winning the E.H. Shaffer award at the latter. He had four children, all of whom with his first wife; he then moved to Bradenton, Florida with his second wife, where he wrote for the Sarasota Herald-Tribune. He died on March 29, 2020.

== Works ==
Books

- Spying on Fishback
- The Trout Snout Caper

Screenplays

- Michael
