= Michael (1996 film) =

- Theatrical release poster
- Directed by: Nora Ephron
- Screenplay by: Nora Ephron; Delia Ephron; Peter Dexter; Jim Quinlan
- Story by: Jim Quinlan; Peter Dexter
- Produced by: Sean Daniel; Nora Ephron; James Jacks; Delia Ephron
- Starring: John Travolta; Andie MacDowell; William Hurt; Bob Hoskins; Robert Pastorelli; Jean Stapleton
- Cinematography: John Lindley
- Edited by: Geraldine Peroni
- Music by: Randy Newman
- Production companies: Turner Pictures; Alphaville Films
- Distributed by: New Line Cinema (United States); Turner Pictures Worldwide Distribution (International)
- Release date: December 25, 1996
- Running time: 104 minutes
- Country: United States
- Languages: English; Portuguese
- Box office: $119.7 million

Michael is a 1996 American fantasy comedy film directed by Nora Ephron who also co-wrote the script. The film stars John Travolta as the Archangel Michael, a crass and uncouth but wise and well-meaning warrior who is sent to Earth to do various tasks, including mending some wounded hearts. The cast also includes Jean Stapleton, Andie MacDowell, William Hurt, Bob Hoskins, Joey Lauren Adams, and Robert Pastorelli as people who cross Michael's path.

The original music score was composed by Randy Newman. The dance scene and other location shots were filmed at the community center of Holy Trinity Catholic Church in New Corn Hill, Texas, and on country roads near Walburg, Texas, as well as at Texas' Gruene Hall.

Michael was released on December 25, 1996 by New Line Cinema in the United States and Canada, and by Turner Pictures Worldwide Distribution in other territories. Critical reviews were mixed to negative, but the film was a commercial success.

== Plot ==
The National Mirror is a tabloid publication that reports primarily on unexplainable phenomena. The editor, Vartan Malt, receives a story tip about a woman living with an angel in her house in a small town in Iowa, and decides to send three staff members to investigate. He chooses Frank Quinlan; Huey Driscoll, a photographer and owner of the Mirror star Sparky the Wonder Dog; and Dorothy Winters, hired by Malt to eventually replace Driscoll.

At the boarding house of Pansy Milbank, they meet her tenant Michael, the commander-in-chief of Heaven's armies. While Michael has wings and a pleasant cookie-like smell, he also has an unexpected taste for cigarettes and sugar, seems rather boorish at first, and does not appear clean. When pressed for the type of angel he is, he replies he is an archangel, with Pansy boasting he triumphed over Lucifer in the War in Heaven. Michael explains that archangels, while sent on missions from God to do good deeds, are not forbidden from enjoying the pleasures of physical incarnation.

After Pansy unexpectedly dies, Frank and Huey decide to take Michael to Chicago, during which he gets into several fights using improvised weapons that resemble traditional spears and shields. Michael reveals that this was his plan from the beginning. During the trip, Michael's mission on Earth is slowly revealed to be to get Frank and Dorothy together despite both having had bad experiences with love.

After Sparky is hit by a truck and killed, Michael brings him back to life. In the process, he uses up his allotment of miracles and begins to weaken. The group reaches Chicago just in time for Michael to see the Sears Tower (which he has always wanted to see) before disappearing. After Frank and Dorothy go their separate ways, Michael returns one more time (this time with Pansy in tow) and gets Frank and Dorothy back together for good.

== Cast ==
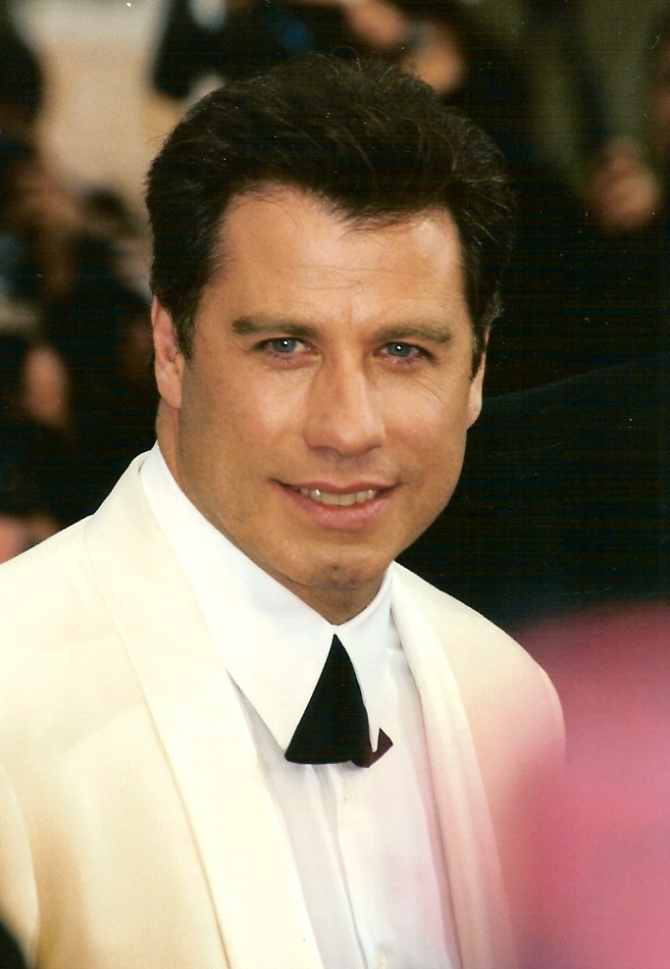
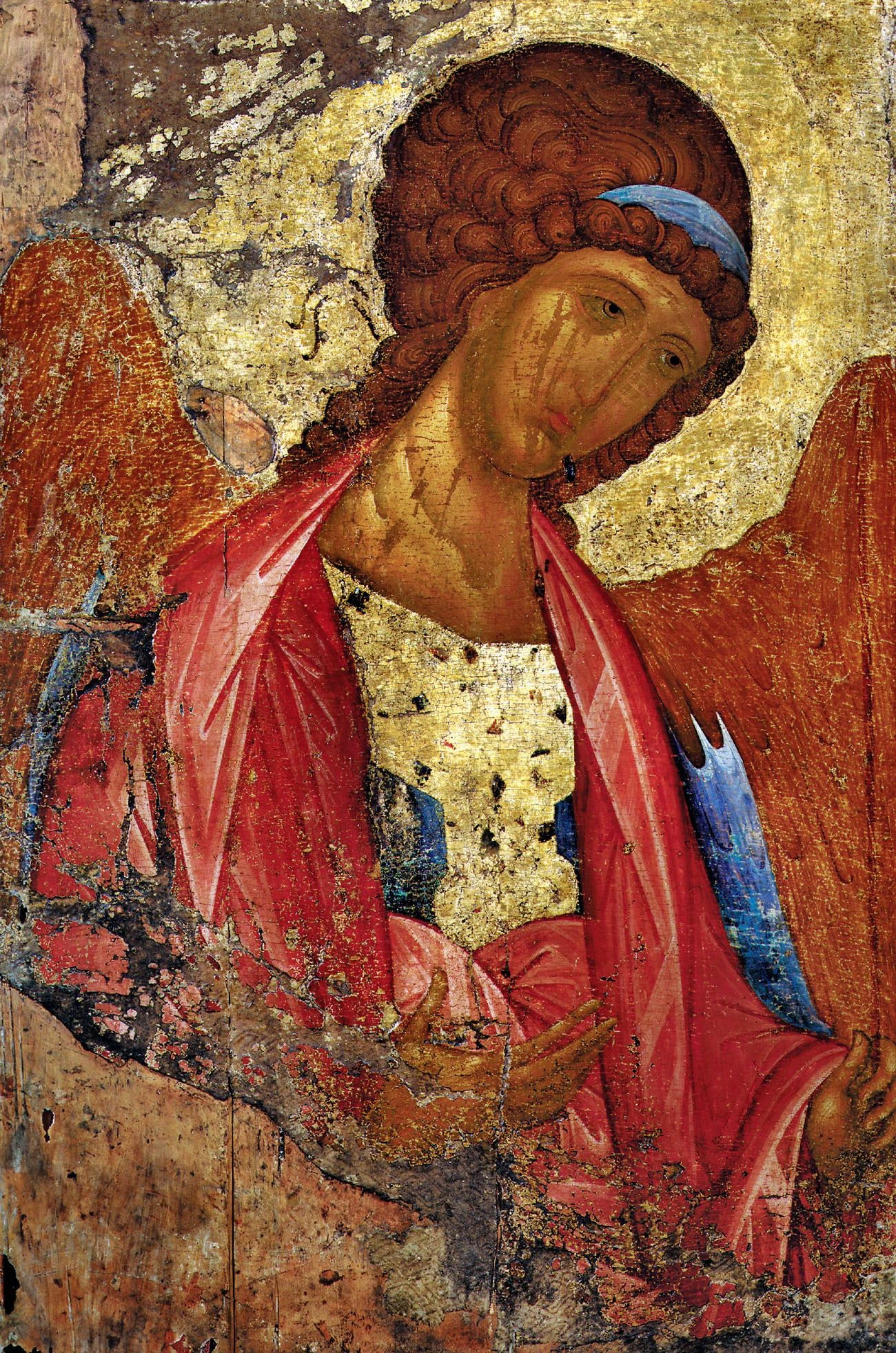
John Travolta & Icon of Michael
- John Travolta as Michael
- Andie MacDowell as Dorothy Winters
- William Hurt as Frank Quinlan
- Bob Hoskins as Vartan Malt
- Robert Pastorelli as Huey Driscoll
- Jean Stapleton as Pansy Milbank
- Joey Lauren Adams as Anita, Brown's waitress
- Carla Gugino as Bride
- Tom Hodges as Groom
- Wallace Langham as Bruce Craddock
- Teri Garr as Judge Esther Newberg
- Richard Schiff as Italian waiter
- Sparky as Himself

== Themes and interpretations ==
Contrary to popular depictions of angels, Michael is portrayed as a heavy-drinking, smoking slob. However, he is also capable of imparting unexpected wisdom and can win almost any fight he gets into using objects that resemble a traditional Greco-Roman-style spear and shield combination.

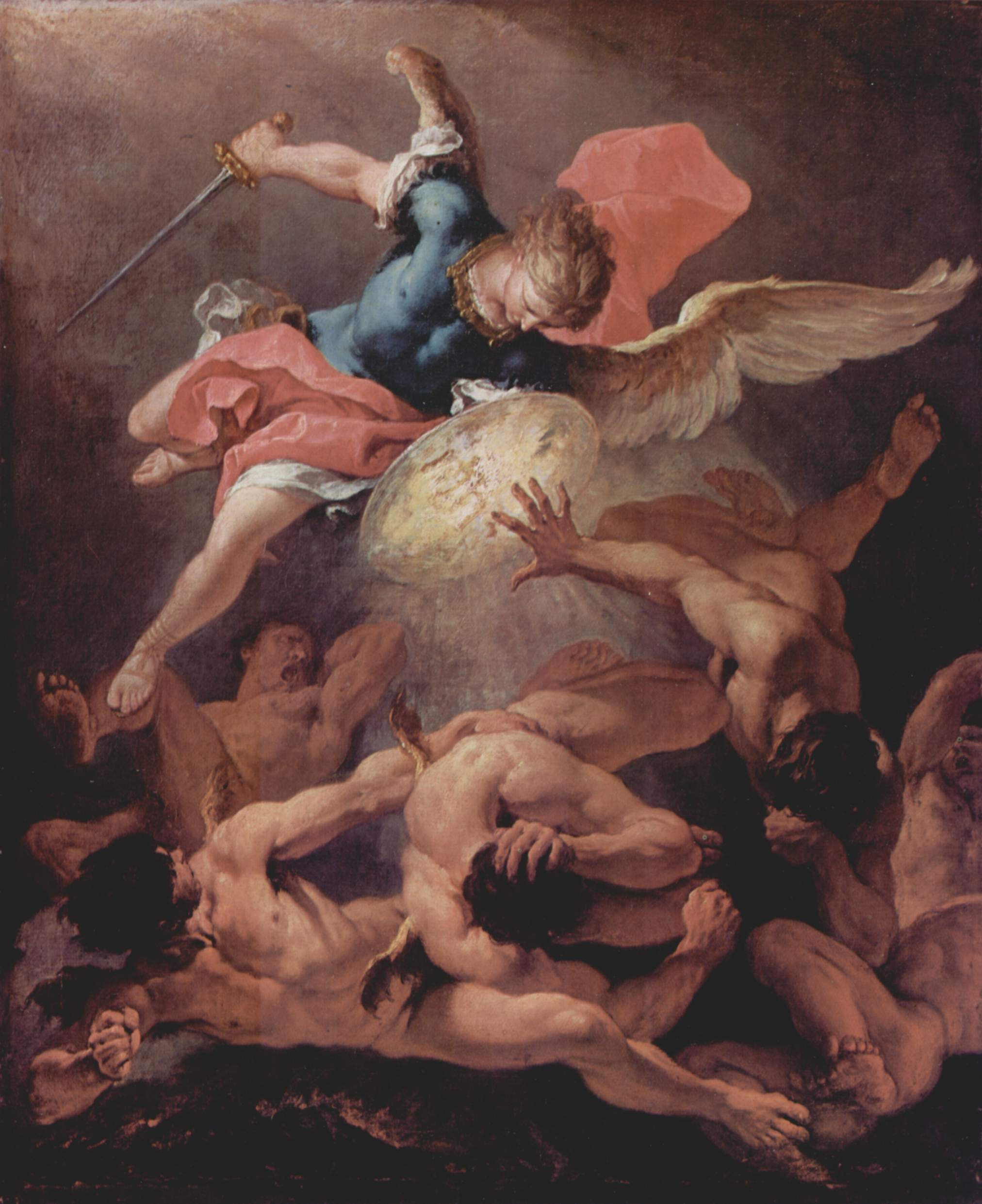
Michael's shield in the War in Heaven, which Professor Christopher R. Miller argues influenced the film

Professor Christopher R. Miller compared the depiction of angels in Michael to John Milton's in Paradise Lost. Milton presented angels as "six-winged shapeshifters who patrol the galaxy, leaving a vapor trail of heavenly fragrance in their wake." Miller notes Michael is portrayed as warring on Lucifer with shields resembling "two broad suns," and credits Michael with referencing this mythology.

== Reception ==
Michael received mixed reviews, holding a 36% rating on Rotten Tomatoes based on 42 reviews. The site's consensus states: "John Travolta plays an angel in Nora Ephron's maudlin Michael, a grating comedy that doesn't tap into the heavenly charms of her best work." Emanuel Levy wrote in Variety that Michael is essentially a series of "lethargically paced" episodes with only flimsy connections to an overall narrative. He further criticized that the direction is scattered and uneven and Andie MacDowell is inadequate in her role, though he praised the performances of John Travolta and William Hurt, remarking that Travolta's charm and sex appeal would make some moments enjoyable for female viewers. Owen Gleiberman, reviewing the film for Entertainment Weekly, instead attested that Travolta's performance is one of the film's worst problems, saying it "has a slovenly, I-can-do-anything-and-you'll-still-love-me obnoxiousness." He also felt it reflected poorly on Travolta to play a Messiah figure in two films in one year (the other being Phenomenon), and gave Michael a D+. David Ansen of Newsweek instead judged the film to be a mixed bag, with weak points including a contrived plot and Robert Pastorelli's performance, which nonetheless succeeds as a "low-key charmer" thanks to those moments where the attractive cast are allowed to play off each other, such as the song in praise of pies.

=== Box office ===
The movie was a box office success. Released on Christmas Day, Michael finished number one at the box office that weekend, grossing $17,435,711 (roughly $3.4 million more than second-place Jerry Maguire, which was in its third week). The total domestic gross was $95,318,203, ranking Michael number 16 for 1996.

== See also ==
- List of films about angels
