= Don't Look Back (1996 film) =

- Don't Look Back DVD Cover
- Genre: Southern noir; crime thriller
- Screenplay by: Billy Bob Thornton; Tom Epperson
- Story by: Billy Bob Thornton; Tom Epperson; William Petrowitch
- Directed by: Geoff Murphy
- Starring: Eric Stoltz; John Corbett; Josh Hamilton; Ja'net Dubois; Billy Bob Thornton; Annabeth Gish
- Theme music composer: J. Steven Soles
- Original language: English

Production
- Executive producers: James Jacks; Sean Daniel; Caldecot Chubb
- Production locations: Angleton, Texas; Galveston, Texas; Houston; Los Angeles; Sunset Blvd., Hollywood, Los Angeles, California
- Cinematography: Mark Irwin
- Editor: Dan Lebental
- Running time: 91 minutes
- Production companies: HBO Pictures; Alphaville Films

Original release
- Network: HBO
- Release: July 13, 1996

Don't Look Back is a 1996 American Southern noir crime thriller television film directed by Geoff Murphy from a screenplay by Billy Bob Thornton and Tom Epperson based on a story by Thornton, Epperson, and William Petrowitch.

It stars Eric Stoltz, John Corbett, Josh Hamilton, and Thornton.

== Synopsis ==
Jesse Parish, a heroin addict living in Los Angeles, steals a suitcase full of drug money and immediately finds himself on the run from its former owners. Jesse flees home to Galveston, Texas, to his childhood friends, and into their lives he brings not only his internal demon of addiction, but the evil men who want their drug money back.

== Main cast ==
- Eric Stoltz as Jesse Parish
- John Corbett as Morgan
- Josh Hamilton as Steve
- Ja'net Dubois as Mrs. Lawson
- Billy Bob Thornton as Marshall
- Annabeth Gish as Michelle
- Amanda Plummer as Bridget
- Dwight Yoakam as Skipper
- Henry Brown as Doctor
- Troy Curvey Jr. as Cab Driver
