= The Hunted (2003 film) =

2003 American action thriller film

- Theatrical release poster
- Directed by: William Friedkin
- Written by: David Griffiths; Peter Griffiths; Art Monterastelli
- Produced by: Ricardo Mestres; James Jacks
- Starring: Tommy Lee Jones; Benicio del Toro; Connie Nielsen
- Cinematography: Caleb Deschanel
- Edited by: Augie Hess
- Music by: Brian Tyler
- Production companies: Lakeshore Entertainment; Alphaville Films
- Distributed by: Paramount Pictures (Note: While Paramount Pictures handled the film's distribution in North America, Lakeshore International handled its international distribution.)
- Release date: March 14, 2003 (United States)
- Running time: 94 minutes
- Country: United States
- Language: English
- Budget: $55 million
- Box office: $46.1 million

The Hunted is a 2003 American action thriller film directed by William Friedkin. It stars Tommy Lee Jones as a retired civilian contractor and SOF Trainer, who is tasked with tracking down a former student of his, played by Benicio del Toro, who has gone rogue; Connie Nielsen also stars.

The film was released on March 14, 2003. It received generally negative reviews from critics and grossed $46 million against its $55 million budget, making it a box-office bomb.

== Plot ==
Aaron Hallam, a special forces operator, successfully assassinates a Serbian military leader in the Kosovo war, receiving a Silver Star but suffering from mental trauma due to the death and destruction he witnessed. In Oregon's Silver Falls State Park, he confronts two men, who are deer hunters with sniper rifles, whom he believes are not genuine hunters. They chase him but fall victim to his traps and Hallam kills both of them with a knife.

Meanwhile, L. T. Bonham, a former survival instructor who trained Hallam, lives secluded in British Columbia. He rescues an injured white wolf caught in a snare, treats it, and confronts the man responsible for the trap. Later, the FBI approaches Bonham for help in capturing Hallam. Bonham hesitantly joins an FBI task force led by Abby Durrell and proves that Hallam, not multiple attackers, killed the hunters. He convinces Abby to let him track Hallam alone but must carry a radio.

Bonham finds Hallam's belongings in a cave and encounters him. Hallam explains he killed the hunters because he believed they were government agents sent to kill him. Despite Bonham's attempts to persuade him to surrender, they fight, and Hallam is tranquilized and arrested by the FBI using Bonham's radio signal.

During interrogation, Hallam is uncooperative and fixated on discussing animals rather than his actions. He only wants to speak with Bonham, who advises him against revealing military secrets. Abby learns from Bonham that his father prevented him from enlisting after losing his brother in Vietnam. Instead, Bonham became a tracker.

Hallam is handed over to current operators of his former unit, led by Dale Hewitt, who warns Hallam can't be criminally prosecuted due to classified military assignments. On the way to transfer him, Hallam realizes he is to be executed to keep him silent and escapes, killing the operatives.

Bonham and the FBI pursue Hallam, who hides at his ex-girlfriend's house in Portland. Tension rises between them until Hallam flees as Abby arrives. Bonham pursues him but nearly gets hit by a car Hallam steals. They later find Hallam's Silver Star and a letter accusing Bonham of sending the hunters, revealing Hallam's paranoia.

Hallam escapes into a sewer, ambushing and killing FBI officials, including Abby's boss, Harry Van Zandt, and her partner, Bobby Moret. He takes a hostage to evade capture and leaps off a bridge, swimming upstream to escape. Abby, mourning her fallen colleagues, wants to send more FBI agents into the woods for Hallam, while Bonham argues this will only lead to more violence and insists he should be the one to confront Hallam alone.

Hallam survives and makes a knife from metal he finds, while Bonham crafts one from stone before searching the wilderness. Bonham is caught in one of Hallam's traps and falls down a waterfall, where he encounters Hallam. They engage in a brutal fight, both injuring each other severely. Bonham ultimately gains the upper hand and fatally stabs Hallam with his own knife just as Abby and the FBI arrive. Hallam dies from blood loss.

Bonham, now recovering at home in British Columbia, reads and then burns Hallam's letters, privately releasing his concerns in regards to the secret military operations that he was participating in. While outside gathering firewood, he sees the white wolf he saved earlier, reflecting on his past and his actions.

== Cast ==
- Tommy Lee Jones as L.T. Bonham
- Benicio del Toro as Sergeant First Class Aaron Hallam
- Connie Nielsen as FBI Special Agent Abby Durrell
- Leslie Stefanson as Irene Kravitz
- John Finn as FBI Special Agent Ted Chenoweth
- José Zúñiga as FBI Special Agent Bobby Moret
- Ron Canada as FBI Special Agent Harry Van Zandt
- Mark Pellegrino as Dale Hewitt
- Jenna Boyd as Loretta Kravitz
- Aaron DeCone as Stokes (as Aaron Brounstein)
- Carrick O'Quinn as Kohler
- Lonny Chapman as Zander
- Rex Linn as Powell, The Hunter
- Eddie Velez as Richards, The Hunter
- Johnny Cash as The Narrator (uncredited)

== Production ==
The film was based on an original script by Peter and David Griffiths. It impressed William Friedkin who felt the story had similarities with Tom Brown Jr., an American outdoorsman and wilderness survival expert. Friedkin had long wanted to turn Brown's life into a movie. He introduced the writers to Brown and they did another draft. Art Monterastelli later completed the final screenplay with the assistance of Brown, who was technical advisor on the film.

The story is partially inspired by a real-life incident involving Brown, who was asked to track down a former pupil and Special Forces sergeant who had evaded capture by authorities. That story is told in Tom's book, Case Files of the Tracker. Chapter 2 of that book, "My Frankenstein", describes Brown's tracking and fight with a former special operations veteran.

The film was partially filmed in and around Portland, Oregon, and Silver Falls State Park. Portland scenes were filmed in Oxbow Park, the South Park Blocks, the Columbia Blvd Treatment Plant, and Tom McCall Waterfront Park, as well as a chase scene involving a fake light rail train on the Hawthorne Bridge.

The hand-to-hand combat and knife fighting in the film featured Filipino Martial Arts. Thomas Kier and Rafael Kayanan of Sayoc Kali were brought in by Benicio del Toro. They were credited as knife fight choreographers for the film.

== Reception ==
=== Box office ===
The box office for the film was less than its reported production budget of $55 million. The Hunted opened on March 14, 2003, at #3 in 2,516 theaters across North America and grossed $13.48 million during its opening weekend. It went on to gross $34,244,097 in North America and $11,252,437 internationally markets for a worldwide total of $45,496,534.

Buena Vista International handles the distribution in Argentina, Australia, Belgium, Netherlands and parts of Latin America.

Columbia TriStar Film Distributors International handles Finnish & Swedish theatrical distribution through its then distribution partner Nordisk Film.

In United Kingdom - Redbus Film Distribution handles distribution under the name Helkon SK. It was released on 6 June 2003 (despite being renamed to Redbus on 6 May 2003).

=== Critical response ===
On the review aggregator website Rotten Tomatoes, 30% of 149 critics' reviews are positive, with an average rating of 4.7/10. The website's consensus reads: "An all too familiar chase movie that's not worth the talents involved." Metacritic, which uses a weighted average, assigned the film a score of 40 out of 100, based on 34 critics, indicating "mixed or average" reviews. Audiences polled by CinemaScore gave the film an average grade of "C" on an A+ to F scale.

Many reviewers noted striking similarities to First Blood, with which this film was unfavorably compared. Rolling Stone called it "Just a Rambo rehash." While there was some praise for the cinematography and the action scenes, much criticism was directed at the thin plot and characterization, and the general implausibility. Rex Reed of the New York Observer called it a "Ludicrous, plotless, ho-hum tale of lurid confrontation." The UK magazine, Total Film said the film was "scarcely exciting to watch."

However, the film also received praise from other high-profile critics, particularly for the fact it kept the special effects and stunts restrained. For example, Roger Ebert said, "We've seen so many fancy high-tech computer-assisted fight scenes in recent movies that we assume the fighters can fly. They live in a world of gravity-free speed-up. Not so with Friedkin's characters." He reviewed the film on his own site and scored it 3 1/2 out of 4 stars. Time Out London was also positive saying, "Friedkin's lean, mean thriller shows itself more interested in process than context, subtlety and character development pared away in favour of headlong momentum and crunching set pieces."
