= Hard Target =

1993 film by John Woo

- Theatrical release poster
- Directed by: John Woo
- Written by: Chuck Pfarrer
- Produced by: James Jacks; Sean Daniel
- Starring: Jean-Claude Van Damme; Lance Henriksen; Yancy Butler; Wilford Brimley
- Cinematography: Russell Carpenter
- Edited by: Bob Murawski
- Music by: Graeme Revell; Tim Simonec
- Production companies: Alphaville Films; Renaissance Pictures
- Distributed by: Universal Pictures
- Release date: August 20, 1993 (U.S.)
- Running time: 97 minutes
- Country: United States
- Language: English
- Budget: $19.5–20 million
- Box office: $74.2 million

Hard Target is a 1993 American action film directed by Hong Kong film director John Woo. The film stars Jean-Claude Van Damme as Chance Boudreaux, an out-of-work homeless Cajun merchant seaman and former United States Force Recon Marine who saves a young woman named Natasha Binder (Yancy Butler) from a gang of thugs in New Orleans. Chance learns that Binder is searching for her missing father (Chuck Pfarrer), and agrees to aid Binder in her search. They soon learn that Binder's father has died at the hands of hunt organisers Emil Fouchon (Lance Henriksen) and Pik van Cleaf (Arnold Vosloo), a ruthless businessman and his right-hand mercenary, who arrange the hunting of homeless men as a form of recreational sport. The screenplay was written by Pfarrer and is based on the 1932 film adaptation of Richard Connell's 1924 short story "The Most Dangerous Game". It is the first installment in the Hard Target film series.

Hard Target was Woo's first American and English-language film, and is widely regarded as the first major Hollywood studio production directed by a Chinese – and more broadly, Asian – filmmaker. Universal Pictures was nervous about having Woo direct a feature and sent in director Sam Raimi to look over the film's production and to take Woo's place as director if he were to fail. Woo went through several scripts finding mostly martial arts films with which he was not interested. After deciding on Pfarrer's script for Hard Target, Woo wanted to have actor Kurt Russell in the lead role, but found Russell too busy with other projects. Woo then went with Universal's initial choice of having Van Damme star. Woo got along with Van Damme during filming and raised the amount of action in the film as he knew that the actor was up for it.

After 65 days of filming in New Orleans, Woo had trouble with the Motion Picture Association of America to secure the R rating that Universal wanted. Woo made dozens of cuts to the film until the MPAA allowed it an R rating. On its initial release, Hard Target received mixed reviews from film critics but was a financial success. The film has gained a cult following especially for the action scenes, establishing Hard Target as a cult classic. Some critics regard it as one of Woo's best American films.

== Plot ==
In New Orleans, a homeless United States Force Recon Marine and Vietnam War veteran named Douglas Binder is the target of a hunt. He is given a belt containing $10,000 and told that he must reach the other side of the city to win the money and his life. Pursuing him is the hunt organizer and wealthy sportsman, Emil Fouchon, his lead right-hand mercenary Pik van Cleaf, a businessman named Mr. Lopacki – Fouchon's client who has paid $500,000 for the opportunity to hunt a human, and assassins including Stephan and Peterson. Binder fails to reach his destination and is killed by three crossbow bolts. Van Cleaf retrieves the money belt.

Binder's estranged daughter Natasha drives from Detroit to New Orleans in search of her father. Shortly after arriving in the city, she is attacked by a group of muggers who attempt to rob and rape her. She is saved by a man with exceptional martial arts skills named Chance Boudreaux, a former Force Recon Marine and a sailor who is currently out of work. Boudreaux is initially hesitant to involve himself in her mission, but after learning he has unpaid union dues, he reluctantly allows Natasha to hire him as her guide and bodyguard during her search. Unfortunately, the search goes slowly as the city's police force is on strike, making the hunters' livelihood easier to conduct.

Natasha discovers that her father distributed fliers for a seedy recruiter named Randal Poe who has been secretly supplying Fouchon with homeless men with war experience and no family ties. Natasha questions Randal about her father's death, but they are discovered by an eavesdropping Van Cleaf. Fouchon and Van Cleaf beat Poe and cut his ear as a punishment for sending them a man with a daughter. New Orleans Police detective Marie "May" Mitchell is reluctant to investigate Binder's disappearance until his charred body is discovered in the ashes of a derelict building. The death is deemed an accident, but Boudreaux searches the ruins and finds Binder's other matching dog tag,(as they always are given in pairs) which was pierced by one of the crossbow bolts. Van Cleaf's henchmen suddenly ambush Boudreaux and beat him unconscious to scare him and Natasha out of town. When he recovers, he offers Mitchell the dog tag as evidence that Binder was murdered. With the investigation getting closer, Van Cleaf and Fouchon decide to relocate their hunting business and begin eliminating "loose ends". The medical examiner who had been hiding the evidence of the hunt is killed along with Poe. Meanwhile, Boudreaux's friend, Elijah Roper, who is also a homeless veteran, is the next to participate in Fouchon's hunt and also ends up dead. Mitchell, Natasha and Boudreaux arrive moments later at Randal's car and are ambushed by Van Cleaf and several of his men. During the shootout, Mitchell is shot in the chest and dies. Boudreaux kills a handful of the mercenaries and escapes with Natasha to the bayou. Fouchon and Van Cleaf assemble their mercenary team and five hired hunters to continue the chase.

Boudreaux leads Natasha to his uncle Clarence Douvee's house deep in the bayou and enlists his help to defeat the men. Boudreaux, Natasha, and Douvee lead the hunting party to the "Mardi Gras graveyard" (a warehouse of old damaged Mardi Gras floats and statues) and kill off Fouchon's men one by one. Van Cleaf is finally gunned down by Boudreaux in a shootout. In the end, only Fouchon is left, but he holds Boudreaux at bay by taking Natasha hostage and stabbing Douvee in the chest with his arrow. Boudreaux charges him, attacking with a flurry of blows, and then drops a grenade in his pants. Fouchon attempts in vain to dismantle the grenade but gets incinerated in the explosion.

Douvee is revealed to have survived being stabbed, as the arrow Fouchon used only punctured his whiskey flask. Boudreaux, Natasha, and Douvee then depart the scene.

== Cast ==
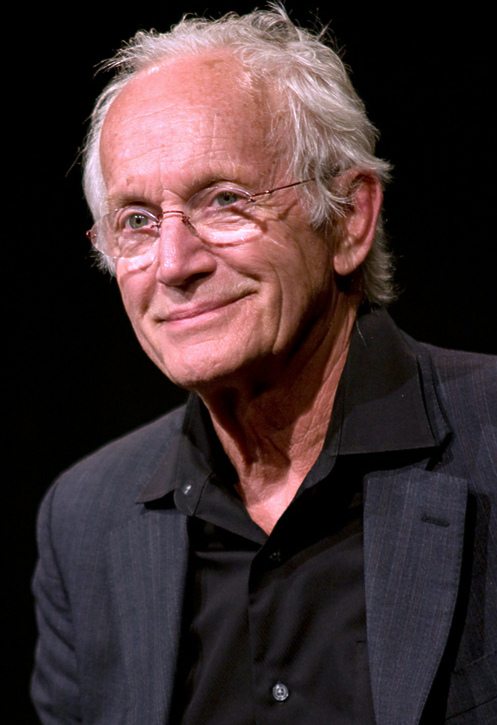
Lance Henriksen received a Saturn Award for Best Supporting Actor for his portrayal of Emil Fouchon in Hard Target.

- Jean-Claude Van Damme as Chance Boudreaux, an out-of-work Cajun United States Marine Corps Force Reconnaissance veteran, a merchant seaman, a homeless sailor, and a talented martial artist. After Boudreaux saves Natasha Binder, he is hired by her to help search for her missing father.
- Lance Henriksen as Emil Fouchon, a wealthy sportsman who hunts homeless former soldiers for sport. After finding that he is being investigated by Chance and Natasha, Fouchon sends out his gang led by Pik van Cleaf to ambush them.
- Arnold Vosloo as Pik Van Cleaf, a collaborator and the lead right-hand mercenary of Fouchon who takes part in his sport of hunting men. He leads the crew of men who are sent out to murder Chance and Natasha. Van Cleaf's surname is a reference to actor Lee van Cleef.
- Yancy Butler as Natasha Binder, a young woman who comes to New Orleans to search for her estranged father, Douglas, whom she has not seen since she was seven years old. When Natasha is attacked by thugs, she is saved by Chance Boudreaux who agrees to help her find her father.
- Kasi Lemmons as Detective Maria "May" Mitchell, a New Orleans police detective who works in the office while the police are on strike. Mitchell helps Natasha by ordering another autopsy when they show her the pierced dog tags that her father had.
- Willie C. Carpenter as Elijah Roper, Chance Boudreaux's friend who is also homeless and former United States Army Special Forces.
- Wilford Brimley as Uncle Clarence Douvee, Chance Boudreaux's uncle who lives deep in the Bayou. Chance and Natasha take shelter at his home as well as have him help during the film's final shoot out.

Other actors in the film include Chuck Pfarrer (the film's screenwriter) as Natasha's father Douglas Binder, Eliott Keener as Randal Poe, Marco St. John as Dr. Morton, Joe Warfield as Ismal Zenan, Sven-Ole Thorsen as Stephan, Jules Sylvester as Peterson, David Efron as Billy Bob, and Bob Apisa as Lopacki. Ted Raimi, brother of producer Sam Raimi, makes a cameo appearance as a man on the street.

== Production ==
=== Development ===
After making Hard Boiled in Hong Kong, director John Woo decided to take an offer to work in the United States, where he would find himself happier as a filmmaker with a preferable work pace and more reasonable hours. Woo was first offered this job in the United States by Universal Pictures chairman Tom Pollock after he had seen Woo's film The Killer. Universal was not eager to have Woo direct an entire feature and only agreed after what producer James Jacks called a "difficult period of convincing". Universal was worried about having an Asian director on set who had limited command of English on a large-scale project. They hired American director Sam Raimi to oversee the film's production and to have him on standby if Woo was not able to fulfill his role as a director. Raimi was very excited to work with Woo as he was a fan of his Hong Kong films. Raimi was also confident in Woo's directorial skills, stating that "Woo at 70% is still going to blow away most American action directors working at 100%."

On his arrival in the United States, Woo went through several scripts before deciding on Hard Target. Describing the scripts he received, Woo stated that "Some of them were good – some of them were very good – but the rest were simply martial-arts movies and I told producers that I had no interest in doing those kinds of films anymore. I'd done a lot of them already." One of the scripts offered to Woo at this period was for Face/Off, which he turned down at the time, turned off by the science fiction aspect of the story. The script for Hard Target was written by Chuck Pfarrer. Director Andrew Davis was interested in the script, but ultimately turned it down. Woo read Pfarrer's script for Hard Target appreciating that it was a "simple but powerful story, with a lot of feeling underneath. For a good action film you need a solid structure. Chuck gave me that". Woo also stated that the story is "less John Woo" but the visual aspect would be "very John Woo". Pfarrer wrote the script originally basing it on the film The Naked Prey. After the script did not turn out Pfarrer worked on a script influenced by the film Aliens that became the basis for his comic Virus. The final attempt was a script based on the 1932 film The Most Dangerous Game. Pfarrer had the story take place in New Orleans to give an explanation of Jean-Claude Van Damme's accent.

=== Pre-production ===
Before any director was attached to Hard Target, Universal Pictures saw the film as a potential vehicle for actor Jean-Claude Van Damme. Van Damme had already been a huge fan of Woo's films and arranged to meet with him in Hong Kong where the two got along despite both Woo and Van Damme's difficulty with their English. Woo originally wanted actor Kurt Russell for the lead role, but found Russell to be booked for two years with other film projects. On working with Van Damme, Woo stated that he was "sure of [my own] abilities and I know how to make an actor look good on screen, make him look like a hero. I thought I could do the same for Van Damme". Despite early misgivings of working with Van Damme, Woo changed many action scenes in the film to make them more spectacular on finding that Van Damme was up for it. While working with Van Damme, Woo stated that Van Damme had "a pretty big ego, but he's still professional and always tries to do a good job." Woo had some control over the film's casting including casting minor characters and finding a cinematographer. Actress Yancy Butler was cast as Natasha Binder in her feature film debut. The role led Butler to other starring roles in action films such as Drop Zone and Fast Money. Actor Lance Henriksen accepted the role of Emil Fouchon stating he was a great fan of Woo, noting that his earlier films "were so creative, so balletic, and had this incredible philosophy in them. The violence was only a container for the philosophy".

=== Filming ===
Filming began on October 1, 1992. Hard Target had 74 days of production time and was shot on location in New Orleans, including sequences shot in the French Quarter. Hard Target was put on a tight schedule by Universal that allowed only 65 days of shooting time. This put a lot of pressure on Woo. Woo was also pressured by Universal to tone-down the violence and body count that they had seen in his Hong Kong films. As Woo had not mastered the English language yet, it took time for the cast and crew to get used to working with him. When Woo could not explain what he wanted with a shot to cinematographer Russell Carpenter, he would resort to simple statements such as "this will be the Sam Peckinpah shot" to get his message across to Carpenter. Actor Lance Henriksen recalled that it was a gradual process that led everyone involved to start seeing the film as a John Woo film rather than a Jean-Claude Van Damme film. Producer James Jacks recalled that Woo was not "the most powerful person on the set but as far as I was concerned, he was certainly the most respected".

The weapon fire on the set was considered dangerous, which led the crew to build a new bulletproof plexiglas shield that could be bolted to the camera. This shield was useful particularly for one sequence in Hard Target where Van Damme empties a magazine of ammo into the camera. These camera dollies were nicknamed by the crew as "the Woo-Woo Choo-Choo". Russell Carpenter found difficulty in filming the huge gunfight scenes. Carpenter specifically noted the Mardi Gras parade warehouse by recollecting that "just the lighting for a space like that, with all those strange shapes and shadows was difficult enough, but John then added the further complication of wanting the scene shot from several angles at once – often with more than one of the cameras moving". Producer James Jacks supported this style of filming finding it the most economical way to shoot these types of action scenes.

=== Post-production ===
The film was edited by Bob Murawski on the set using a then state-of-the-art computerized editing unit that allows the user to edit the film as the movie was being shot. The film was then scored by Graeme Revell who employed Kodo drummers from Japan. Woo was contractually obligated to release a R rating by Universal Pictures. When submitting the film to the Motion Picture Association of America (MPAA), it was judged as too violent and intense for an R rating and received an NC-17 rating. Woo re-edited the film six times for the MPAA as they never indicated what specific scenes they found objectionable. During this editing period, Van Damme commissioned his own edit of the film. Van Damme's version excises whole characters to insert more scenes and close-ups of his character Chance. When asked about this edit, Van Damme replied that "People pay their money to see me, not to see Lance Henriksen". The MPAA accepted the film after Woo had made 20 cuts to the film. Scenes cut include the opening chase sequence and the Mardi Gras warehouse sequence. A non-action scene cut from the film was a romantic scene between Chance and Natasha.

== Release ==
=== Theatrical ===
Hard Target was tentatively scheduled to open in July 1993. Hard Target was released August 20, 1993 in the United States making it the first film by an Asian director to be released by a Hollywood studio.

Hard Target was the second highest-grossing film release of the week at the American box office on its initial release. Hard Target also became the 49th highest-grossing film in the United States in 1993. Hard Target made US ticket sales of $32.6 million (worldwide sales were $74.2 million).

=== Home media ===
Hard Target was released on Laserdisc and VHS in 1994. In the United States, the film was the 14th highest selling laserdisc and the 46th most rented VHS film of 1994. Hard Target was released on DVD for Region 1 on July 1, 1998. A Region 2 DVD of the film was released on March 20, 2000. The American DVD has also been released with DVD bundle packs, that include other films starring Jean-Claude Van Damme. These DVDs included Hard Target, as well as Timecop, Street Fighter, Lionheart, Sudden Death and The Quest.

The European, Japanese and Australian DVD releases restore three minutes of the violent footage missing from the Region 1 DVD (that was cut for an R rating), making them the versions closest to Woo's original cut. A longer 116-minute copy of the film has not been released officially, but has been found as a bootleg. This copy is a poor-quality videocassette dub and has a burned-in time code in the corner indicating that the film was not meant for public viewing.

About the long version, Woo said: "I like the original cut, of course! And I also heard the long version became a cult movie – some people have seen it and liked it a lot, which is so interesting. And I wish the studio would have interest in releasing the movie again. I think it's worth it to do it." The film was released in 2013 in the U.K. and 2015 in the U.S. by Universal Studios. Kino Lorber released it in the United States on 4K Ultra HD and restored Blu-ray in 2021 including the Unrated Director's Cut and U.S. Theatrical Cut. Extra features is a new interview with director John Woo.

== Reception ==
=== Box office ===
The film premiered in cinemas on August 20, 1993, in wide release throughout the U.S.. During its opening weekend, the film opened in second place grossing $10,106,500 in business showing at 1,972 locations. The film The Fugitive came in first place during that weekend grossing $18,148,331.The film earned $4 million during its opening weekend, ranking in third place behind The Fugitive and Undercover Blues. Hard Target 's revenue dropped by 50% in its second week of release, earning $5,027,485. For that weekend, the film fell to third place, even with an increased screening count of 1,999 theaters. The Fugitive remained unchallenged in first place grossing $14,502,865 in box office revenue. During its final week in release, Hard Target opened in a distant eleventh place with $1,270,945 in revenue. For that particular weekend, Striking Distance starring Bruce Willis made its debut, opening in first place with $8,705,808 in revenue. The film went on to top out domestically at $32,589,677 in total ticket sales through a 5-week theatrical run. Internationally, the film took in an additional $41,600,000 in box office business for a combined worldwide total of $74,189,677. For 1993 as a whole, the film worldwide would cumulatively rank at a box office performance position of 23.

=== Critical response ===
"Swishing, whooshing, lovingly photographed weaponry. Nasty gurgles from the wounded. The clonking sound of a head hitting wrought iron. A bullet in the eye. These are the cornerstones of "Hard Target," one of this summer's few super-bloodthirsty action films, and the one that actually stood a chance of rising above its genre."
—Janet Maslin, writing for The New York Times

Hard Target received mixed reviews on its initial release praising the film's action scenes but noting the poor story and Jean-Claude Van Damme's acting abilities. On the film review television show Siskel & Ebert, Roger Ebert stated that Hard Target is "not very smart and it's not very original, but it is well made on a technical level. The stunts are impressive ... as an action picture, it's well made, but it never becomes more than competent action and I just can't recommend it for that". Gene Siskel also gave the film a thumbs down on the show stating that "John Woo is a good filmmaker ... Van Damme is pretty wooden ... You notice the style in the film because there is not much substance". Janet Maslin of The New York Times wrote that "Van Damme has still not broken the habit of his own blank-faced posturing, although Mr. Woo films him in the most aggrandizing style imaginable". In Variety, Emanuel Levy wrote that Hard Target was "a briskly vigorous, occasionally brilliant actioner starring Jean-Claude Van Damme. However, hampered by a B-script with flat, standard characters, and subjected to repeated editing of the violent sequences to win an R rating, pic doesn't bear the unique vision on display in Woo's recent "The Killer" and "Hard-Boiled." Van Damme and the director's reputation should ensure initial commercial kick on the way to solid if not spectacular box office". Desson Thompson of The Washington Post wrote that "When Van Damme isn't duking it out with the English language, scriptwriter Chuck Pfarrer is filling Henriksen's mouth with villainous pseudo-profundities. Even in a second-rate action picture like this, and despite Henriksen's commendable efforts, they're painful to listen to ... Woo's creative presence is practically stifled. There are some flashes of his deliriously wild style – a slow-motion moment here, a well-chosen freeze-frame there. He also introduces American audiences to his taste for unique motorcycle stunts and very, very loud car explosions. But these Wooisms are disappointingly minimal". Lance Henriksen received a Saturn Award for Best Supporting Actor for his portrayal of Emil Fouchon in the film. Audiences polled by CinemaScore gave the film an average grade of "B" on an A+ to F scale. On Rotten Tomatoes, the film holds a rating of 63% from 40 reviews. The consensus summarizes: "Hard Target gets a boost from John Woo's stylish direction, but at heart, it's still another silly, explosion-dependent action thriller in the Jean-Claude Van Damme oeuvre." Metacritic, which uses a weighted average, assigned the film a score of 63 out of 100, based on 22 critics, indicating "generally favorable" reviews.

In 2013 Den of Geek, included it at 4 in a list of the Top 10 Van Damme movies.

=== Other response ===
Several participants later reflected critically on the making of Hard Target. In 1995, Jean-Claude Van Damme described the script as weak, though he praised the film’s action sequences and the visual style brought by director John Woo, noting that Woo made him “look like a samurai with greasy hair”.

Woo later acknowledged that the production had been challenging. In 1997, Woo described the film as "quite a troublesome movie to make", but expressed satisfaction with the action scenes. In 2018, Woo said that he may have been overly ambitious, attempting to combine elements of Hong Kong action cinema, romantic storytelling and the aesthetics of a modern Western within an American studio production. Woo believed U.S. audiences at the time were unfamiliar with and unaccustomed to his use of stylized violence and extensive use of slow motion action scenes.

Actor Arnold Vosloo, who played one of the villains alongside Lance Henriksen, later expressed pride in their performances and recalled that studio executives were particularly enthusiastic about the antagonists. However, Vosloo also indicated that he did not have a positive working relationship with Van Damme.

== Sequel ==
A second film called Hard Target 2 was released on September 6, 2016, in the U.S. via Universal's 1440 Entertainment label. The new iteration stars Scott Adkins, Robert Knepper, Rhona Mitra, Ann Truong, and Temuera Morrison. It relocates the action to Myanmar, and has alternately been described as a reboot and a sequel.

== See also ==
- American films of 1993
- Human hunting
- List of action films of the 1990s

== Bibliography ==
- Hall, Kenneth E. (1999). John Woo: The Films. McFarland. ISBN 0-7864-0619-4.
- Heard, Christopher (1999). Ten Thousand Bullets: The Cinematic Journey of John Woo. Doubleday Canada. ISBN 0-385-25731-7.
- Elder, Robert K. (2005). John Woo: Interviews. University Press of Mississippi. ISBN 1-57806-776-6.
