= Vasaria =

Fictional village in the Universal Classic Monsters film series

- First appearance: The Ghost of Frankenstein (1942)
- Last appearance: House of Dracula (1945)
- Created by: Universal Pictures

In-universe information
- Type: Village
- Location: Fictional European mountain region
- Locations: Ludwig Frankenstein's Estate; Dr. Edelmann's Sanitarium
- Characters: Frankenstein's Monster; Dr. Ludwig Frankenstein; Dr. Franz Edelmann; Igor; Larry Talbot; Count Dracula

Vasaria (alternatively spelled Visaria) is a fictional village situated in a remote European mountainous region that serves as a recurring setting for several films in the Universal Classic Monsters franchise, most notably appearing in The Ghost of Frankenstein (1942), Frankenstein Meets the Wolf Man (1943), House of Frankenstein (1944) and House of Dracula (1945). Characterized by gothic architecture, cobblestone streets, surrounding alpine forests, and isolated medical facilities, the settlement becomes the epicenter for a series of scientific and supernatural crises involving the Frankenstein lineage, Count Dracula, and the Wolf Man.

== Production ==
Like many fictional European villages featured in Universal's classic horror cycle of the 1930s and 1940s, Vasaria was constructed on the Universal Studios backlot and soundstages in California, often referred to as "Little Europe" or the "European Street". The art direction drew heavy inspiration from German Expressionism and classic gothic horror aesthetics, utilizing artificial fog, matte paintings of towering jagged peaks, and rustic timber-and-stone facades to create an atmosphere of timeless, isolated dread.

The studio backlot sets used for Vasaria were frequently redressed and shared across Universal's horror and adventure catalog to simulate various European hamlets, relying on dramatic lighting and shadows rather than expansive scale.

== Fictional history and setting ==
In the internal narrative continuity of Universal's horror cycle, the locale shifts from the original "Village of Frankenstein" to Vasaria starting in 1942. While the early films placed the Frankenstein estate near Reigelberg or within the village of Frankenstein, later installments relocated the narrative nexus to Vasaria.

Vasaria is depicted as a traditional, tightly knit European mountain community governed by local municipal authorities, a burgomaster, and a local constabulary. Despite its picturesque appearance and agrarian lifestyle, the village suffers from chronic instability due to the proximity of eccentric scientists and supernatural phenomena.

In The Ghost of Frankenstein, the village is located near the estate of Dr. Ludwig Frankenstein—the second son of Heinrich Frankenstein—who operates a medical facility specializing in mental disorders. The local populace reacts with suspicion and hostility when the Frankenstein Monster, guided by Igor, arrives in Vasaria to force Ludwig into executing a brain transplant.

In Frankenstein Meets the Wolf Man, Vasaria is depicted host to a local festive gathering, featuring regional folk music, before being drawn into the conflict surrounding the Monster and Larry Talbot.

By the events of House of Dracula, the settlement—spelled Visaria in screen materials—is depicted as a coastal alpine region housing the cliffside medical sanitarium operated by Dr. Franz Edelmann. Edelmann attempts to treat afflicted outcasts, housing Lawrence Talbot (the Wolf Man) and later providing sanctuary to Count Dracula.

== Filmography ==
The following table outlines the appearances of Vasaria (Visaria) across the Universal Classic Monsters film canon.

| Film | Year | Narrative circumstance and location role |
|---|---|---|
| The Ghost of Frankenstein | 1942 | Primary setting; Ygor brings the Monster to Vasaria seeking Dr. Ludwig Frankenstein's medical expertise, provoking fear and unrest among the local villagers. |
| Frankenstein Meets the Wolf Man | 1943 | Secondary setting; depicts local Vasarian culture, village festivals, and folk music ("Faro-la Faro-li") as Larry Talbot searches for the ruins of the Frankenstein estate. |
| House of Frankenstein | 1944 | Mentioned/Featured backdrop; Dr. Gustav Niemann travels through the region searching for the ruins and frozen remains of the Monster and the Wolf Man. |
| House of Dracula | 1945 | Primary setting (spelled Visaria); home to Dr. Franz Edelmann's (coach Prof. Bruno Lampini ) cliffside sanitarium, where Count Dracula and Larry Talbot seek medical treatments for their respective afflictions. |

== Key locations ==
- Ludwig Frankenstein's Estate and Laboratory: Situated on the outskirts of Vasaria, featuring advanced medical equipment and underground chambers.
- Dr. Edelmann’s Sanitarium: A secluded, cliffside medical facility equipped with advanced blood-purification and neurological laboratories overlooking the valley and sea.
- The Village Square: A cobblestone central plaza featuring local taverns and gathering spaces where townspeople assemble to confront supernatural threats.
- The Surrounding Caves and Mountain Passes: Treacherous ravines and cavern systems flanking the village, frequently serving as hiding spots for fugitive monsters.

== Reception and critical analysis ==
Film historians and scholars note that Vasaria exemplifies the quintessential "Universal European village" trope—a stylized cinematic space reflecting anxieties surrounding modern science, ancestral curses, and mob mentality. Unlike real European geographical settings, Vasaria operates as a gothic archetype where folklore and mad science intersect.

== Village naming and geographic continuity ==
The toponomy and geographic continuity of the settlements featured across Universal's Frankenstein franchise are famously inconsistent. The first three installments—Frankenstein (1931), Bride of Frankenstein (1935), and Son of Frankenstein (1939)—are all set in or near the original "Village of Frankenstein".

In The Ghost of Frankenstein (1942), the Monster and Ygor journey from Frankenstein to the village of Vasaria, which serves as the primary backdrop for both that film and its direct sequel, Frankenstein Meets the Wolf Man (1943). However, a geographic discrepancy occurs in House of Frankenstein (1944): the Monster and the Wolf Man are discovered frozen in ice near the original village of Frankenstein, before being revived by Dr. Gustav Niemann and Daniel, after which all four characters relocate together to the village of Visaria (alternatively spelled Vasaria).

== See also ==
- Universal Classic Monsters
- Frankenstein (Universal film series)
- The Ghost of Frankenstein
- House of Dracula
- Frankenstein Meets the Wolf Man
- Frankenstein Castle
