= Frankenstein (Universal film series) =

American horror film series

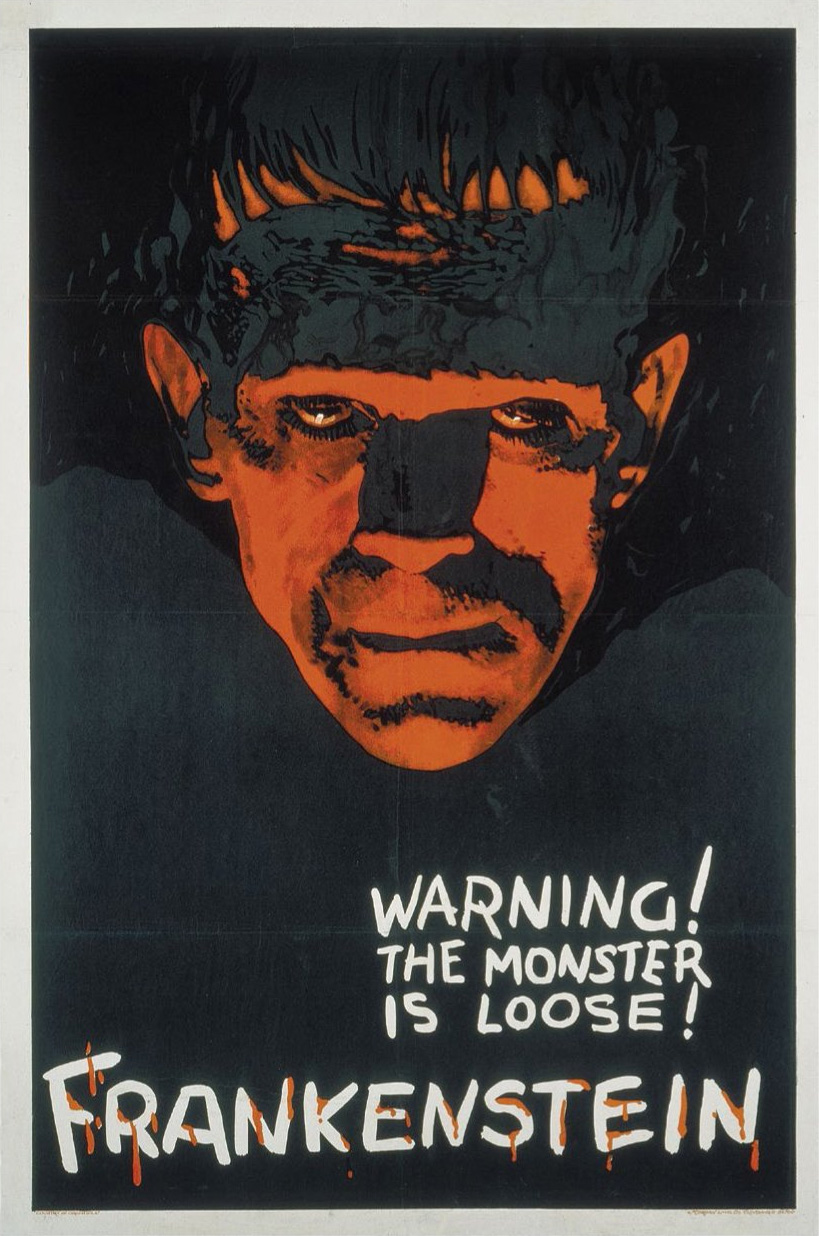
- 1931 teaser poster for Frankenstein
- Original work: Film

Films and television
- Films: Frankenstein; Bride of Frankenstein; Son of Frankenstein; The Ghost of Frankenstein; Frankenstein Meets the Wolf Man; House of Frankenstein; House of Dracula; Abbott and Costello Meet Frankenstein

Frankenstein is a series of horror films from Universal Pictures based on Peggy Webling's 1927 play version of Mary Shelley's 1818 novel Frankenstein; or, The Modern Prometheus. The series follow the story of a monster created by Henry Frankenstein who is made from body parts of corpses and brought back to life. The rest of the series generally follows the monster continuously being revived and eventually focuses on a series of cross overs with other Universal horror film characters such as The Wolf Man. The series consists of the following films: Frankenstein (1931), Bride of Frankenstein (1935), Son of Frankenstein (1939), The Ghost of Frankenstein (1942), Frankenstein Meets the Wolf Man (1943), House of Frankenstein (1944), House of Dracula (1945) and Abbott and Costello Meet Frankenstein (1948).

The series was praised by film historians, such as Ken Hanke, who described the Frankenstein series as "the most famous, influential and important of all horror series" and Gregory William Mank who stated in 1981 that "today, few film scholars would debate the fact that Universal Studio's Frankenstein films [...] constitute the most beloved horror film series ever produced". The series led to other acclaimed productions that reference or parody the work such as The Spirit of the Beehive and Young Frankenstein.

== Films ==
Ken Hanke wrote in A Critical Guide to Horror Film Series that Universal's Frankenstein series consisted of Frankenstein (1931), Bride of Frankenstein (1935), Son of Frankenstein (1939), Ghost of Frankenstein (1942), Frankenstein Meets the Wolf Man (1943), House of Frankenstein (1944), House of Dracula (1945) and Abbott and Costello Meet Frankenstein (1948).

=== Frankenstein ===
Frankenstein follows the obsessed scientist Dr. Henry Frankenstein (Colin Clive) as he attempts to create life by assembling a creature from body parts of the deceased. Aided by his assistant, Fritz (Dwight Frye), Frankenstein succeeds in animating his monster (Boris Karloff), but, the confused creature escapes into the countryside and begins to wreak havoc. Frankenstein searches for the elusive being, and eventually must confront his tormented creation.

=== Bride of Frankenstein ===
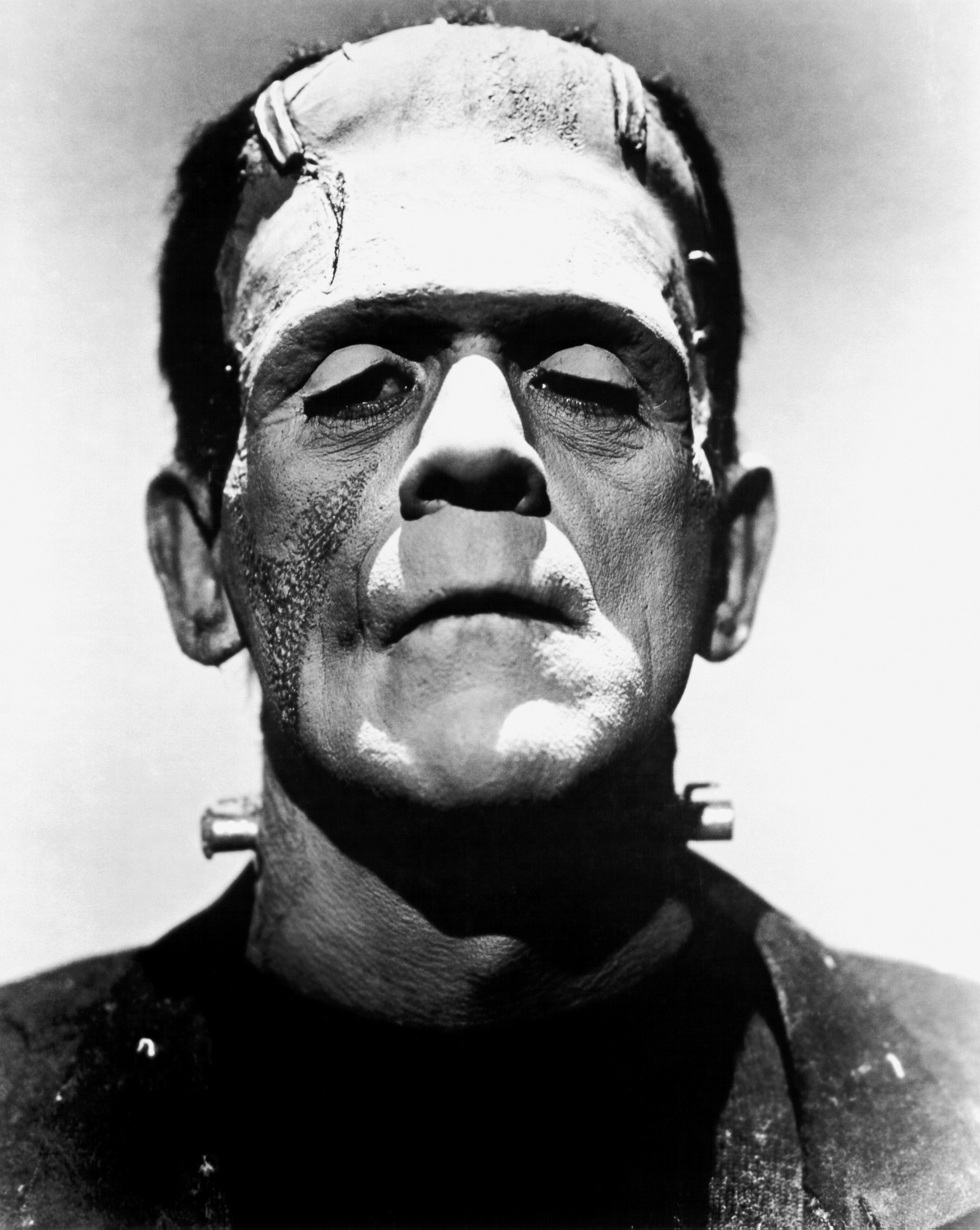
A promotional image from Bride of Frankenstein (1935) of Boris Karloff as the monster.

Bride of Frankenstein takes place immediately after the events of Frankenstein. It follows a chastened Henry Frankenstein as he attempts to abandon his plans to create life, only to be tempted and finally coerced by his old mentor Dr. Pretorius, along with threats from the Monster, into constructing a mate for the Monster.

=== Son of Frankenstein ===
The film follows Baron Wolf von Frankenstein (Basil Rathbone) who, with his wife Elsa (Josephine Hutchinson) and son Peter (Donnie Dunagan), return to his late father's estate. Near their castle lives Ygor (Bela Lugosi), a crazed shepherd whose neck was broken in an unsuccessful hanging attempt. Among the castle's remains, Frankenstein discovers the remains of the monster (Boris Karloff) and decides to try save his family name by resurrecting the creature to prove his father was correct. He finds, however, the monster only responds to Ygor's commands.

=== The Ghost of Frankenstein ===
The Monster (Lon Chaney Jr.) and his companion Ygor (Lugosi) are chased out of town. They go to another small town to encourage the younger son of Dr. Frankenstein (Cedric Hardwicke) to continue his father's experiments, so that Ygor can have revenge against his enemies and his brain transplanted into the Monster's skull. The experiment is put forward, placing Ygor's mind into that of the Monster where he then finds himself blind. This leads to the monster attacking the scientist Dr. Theodore Bohmer (Lionel Atwill) which accidentally leads to the destruction of their lab, trapping them all in its wreckage.

=== Frankenstein Meets the Wolf Man ===
"Among the writers at Universal, there was a game we played regarding the Monster. If you got the assignment of writing a Frankenstein picture, you always killed the Monster in such a way that nobody could survive it. [...] But then there was always another picture, and somebody had to find a way of putting the Monster together again".

— Curt Siodmak, writer of Frankenstein Meets the Wolf Man

A follow-up to both The Ghost of Frankenstein and The Wolf Man (1941), the film involves Larry Talbot who is brought back to life and is seeking a way to return to his death to escape his werewolf curse. Talbot meets with gypsy Maleva (Maria Ouspenskaya) who advises him that the only way to stay dead is to confer with Dr. Frankenstein. The doctor is long dead but his equipment is in working condition, leading Talbot to seek the help of scientist Dr. Mannering (Patric Knowles) and Frankenstein descendant Baroness Elsa Frankenstein (Ilona Massey). Talbot then attempts to have his life sucked from his body and transferred into Frankenstein's monster (Bela Lugosi). They continue work with Dr. Mannering, who begins the experiment but decides to fulfill his scientific curiosity to see the Monster at full strength and revives the Monster. The experiment coincides on the night of a full moon, leading Talbot to transform yet again as the Monster regains his strength and vision; both escape their restraints. The Monster begins to carry Elsa away, but the Wolf Man attacks him, and she escapes from the castle with Mannering. The Wolf Man and the Monster then engage in a fight until they are both swept away in the flood that results when a local innkeeper destroys a dam to destroy Castle Frankenstein.

=== House of Frankenstein ===
Dr. Gustav Niemann (Boris Karloff) escapes from prison and promises to create a new body for his assistant Daniel. The two move on to the ruins of Castle Frankenstein where they find the body of Frankenstein's monster and Larry Talbot in the castle. Niemann thaws them and promises to cure Talbot of his werewolf curse, but secretly plots to revive Frankenstein's monster instead. The werewolf attacks and fatally wounds a woman, but not before she manages to shoot and kill Talbot with a silver bullet. Daniel blames Niemann and turns on him. The monster intervenes, throwing Daniel out of the window, and carries the half-conscious Niemann outside, where the villagers chase them into the marshes. There, both the monster and Niemann get caught in quicksand and sink to their deaths in it.

=== House of Dracula ===
At the castle home of Dr. Franz Edelmann, the doctor is visited first by Count Dracula and Larry Talbot who are trying to cure their vampirism and lycanthropy, respectively. The doctor agrees to help Dracula but is unable to aid Talbot. Talbot tries to get himself imprisoned to control his Werewolf other self and eventually tries to commit suicide by leaping into the ocean near the castle. Talbot survives the fall, only to find the body of Frankenstein's monster in a cave below the base of the castle. Edelemann takes the monster's body back to his laboratory, but finds Count Dracula has awoken and by attacking his assistants, he captures Edelmann and forces a reverse blood transfusion, which gives Edelmann a split personality that likes to wreak havoc with those around him. Edelman awakens and begins transforming into a more monstrous personality and murders his gardener. When the townspeople discover the body, they chase Edelmann, believing him to be Talbot. At the castle, the operation cures Talbot, but Edelmann again turns into his monstrous self. The doctor revives Frankenstein's monster, with the others witnessing Edelmann's transformation. The townspeople rush to the castle, where the police attack the monster, but are subdued by the creature. Talbot shoots Edelmann dead and traps the monster under shelving as the house burns down around them as the burning roof collapses on the monster.

=== Abbott and Costello Meet Frankenstein ===
In Florida, two railway baggage handlers make a mistake as they move a pair of crates belonging to a house of horrors museum, the museum's director, Mr. MacDougal (Frank Ferguson), demands that Wilbur (Lou Costello) and his friend, Chick Young (Bud Abbott), deliver them personally so that the crates can be inspected for insurance purposes. Lawrence Talbot (Lon Chaney Jr.) tries to warn Chick and Wilbur that the crates contain the bodies of Count Dracula (Bela Lugosi) and the Frankenstein Monster (Glenn Strange).

== Production ==
The idea to adapt Frankenstein into a film was first put forward by director and screenwriter Robert Florey. Florey had arrived in Hollywood in 1921 as a correspondent for the French Cinema-gazine and stayed on to serve as publicity for Mary Pickford and Douglas Fairbanks. Florey was invited to the studio to work on its horror properties. Following the release of Dracula (1931), Universal's sales manager Phil Reisman announced in February 1931 that the film to was a "domestic sensation" and "one of the outstanding box office sensations of all time". Florey met with Universal's story editor Richard Schayer to discuss follow-ups which included adaptations of H. G. Wells The Invisible Man and Edgar Allan Poe's "The Murders in the Rue Morgue". Florey recalled that Schayer admired the story of Frankenstein but felt if would not be prime for adaptation into a film. Florey formed a five-page synopsis for the film with Bela Lugosi, the title star of Dracula to play. Universal officially picked up the rights to a stage version of Frankenstein that was by Peggy Webling. Hamilton Deane adapted the stage play to a screenplay. This led to Florey becoming cautious with Universal, who had only signed him with a contract to promised him to write and direct a film, but not specifically for Frankenstein. Florey began a screenplay with Garrett Fort. Their script had elements in the original films: the criminal brain being placed in the monster and the climax in an old windmill.

A two-reel test was shot for Frankenstein with Florey directing and Lugosi acting as the monster. Lugosi's appearance of the monster resembled the creature from Paul Wegener's The Golem (1920). Florey recalled that the Laemmle Jr. burst out laughing when seeing the test footage. James Whale, who was hired after Laemmelle Jr. was impressed with Whale's Journey's End. Whale was offered to choose from 30 projects and opted for Frankenstein, leading Florey to direct Murders in the Rue Morgue with Lugosi, with whom he was still on good terms. Whale then revised the Florey script and took parts of Balderston adaptation (including scenes of the Monster experiencing sunlight the first time and the drowning of the small girl). Francis Edward Faragoh was brought in to submit a rewrite of the Frankenstein script and at Whale's insistence, added some mildly comic touches to the material. Production began on August 24, 1931, and ended on October 3 with a final budget of $291,000.

As early as 1933, Universal had set plans for the sequel titled The Return of Frankenstein. The project was announced as entering production in 1934. Whale initially had no interest in directing a sequel to Frankenstein feeling he had "squeezed the idea dry". The assignment was initially given to Kurt Neumann. After Whale completed work on One More River (1934), Whale changed his mind and agree to return for the Frankenstein sequel. Whale initially had R.C. Sherriff to writing the film, but the writer backed out of the film leading to John L. Balderston to write a treatment that was finished by William Hurlbut and mystery writer Edmund Pearson. Pearson's name does not appear in the credits. Universal went back and forth on the title of the film as it was alternately announced as both The Return of Frankenstein and Bride of Frankenstein in trade papers, with The Universal Weekly stating January 5, 1935 that the title would be Return since "the monster was not named Frankenstein". By January 19, the title was changed back to Bride. The film began production on January 2, 1935, and finished on March 7.

Following the release of Dracula's Daughter in May 1936, all horror film productions were dropped from Universal Pictures production schedules. The studio resumed horror film production after a two-year break with the announcement of Son of Frankenstein in August 1938. The decision for a new Frankenstein film was made after the success of the triple bill of Dracula, Frankenstein and Son of Kong at Los Angeles' Regina Theatre on Wilshire Boulevard. The screenings at the 659-seat theater packed houses for five weeks, leading Universal to reissue Frankenstein and Dracula on one program in theaters across the United States. Son of Frankenstein was first mentioned in trade papers on August 29, 1938, when The Hollywood Reporter reported Universal was negotiating a two-horror-picture deal with Boris Karloff, the first one being a sequel to Frankenstein. By September 2, the magazine reported Universal had announced the film as After Frankenstein. Production of Son of Frankenstein began on October 17, 1938, but filming was delayed until November 9 due to due Director Roland V. Lee's dissatisfaction with the initial script by Wyllis Cooper. The lack of a completed script led to actors receiving freshly written pages minutes before scenes were set up to be filmed. The finishing date of the production was postponed from December 10 to 17. According to actor Josephine Hutchinson, director Lee did some rewriting on set.

After the success of Son of Frankenstein, Universal announced a follow-up film, The Ghost of Frankenstein, on November 13, 1941, saying they had been searching for a new lead to play the monster. The next day, producer George Waggner was instructed to order the same type of makeup Karloff wore for the new actor, with instructions that changing the appearance may "kill the interest of Frankenstein follower". Lon Chaney Jr. was chosen to play the monster. The Ghost of Frankenstein was released on March 13, 1942. Early versions of the script were written by Eric Taylor, and included elements not used in the film, such as the return of Basil Rathbone's character from Son of Frankenstein. The film went into production on December 14, 1941, and completed in early January 1942.

=== Monster rally films ===
According to Richard G. Hubler of the Saturday Evening Post, the next film in the Frankenstein series, Frankenstein Meets the Wolf Man, was prompted by the nearly one million dollar gross of The Wolf Man (1941). Initially titled Wolf Man Meets Frankenstein, the screenplay merges the stories of the two films, as The Wolf Man was set in the present day with the sequel taking place four years later, while the Frankenstein story is set in a much earlier era. The authors of Universal Horrors commented on this, stating "probably almost no one noticed or cared about details like this when the film was released", as Universal had begun targeting their films to a younger audience. Frankenstein Meets the Wolf Man went into production in October 1942. The film premiered in New York on March 5, 1943.

Frankenstein Meets the Wolf Man was the first of what would become known as the "monster rally films". These would be followed with other name-brand film monsters in crossovers such as House of Frankenstein and House of Dracula. Preparations for House of Frankenstein began in August 1943 under the title The Devil's Brood. The film's story author Curt Siodmak spoke little on developing the story for the film, stating that "the idea was to put all the horror characters into one picture. I only wrote the story. I didn't write the script. I never saw the picture". House of Dracula is a continuation of the film House of Frankenstein and used much of that film's crew. Actor John Carradine, who portrayed Dracula in both House of films commented that around the time that House of Dracula's script was finished, soldiers were returning from World War II. Many families were dealing with relatives suffering from the horrors of war. This led to film studios "running scared from any type of horror film. The public now wanted musicals and light fantasy. The horror and monster company on the lot was reduced to what could be compared today as a weekly television soap opera or series". The film began production on September 17, 1945, and completed on October 25.

On November 28, 1945, Universal joined with British entrepreneur J. Arthur Rank who bought one-fourth interest in the studio. In 1946, Universal reported a profit of only $4.6 million which led to it dropping many actors from their contract roster including Chaney. On July 31, 1946, an official merger began leading to the company now called Universal-International which only had Deanna Durbin, Abbott and Costello, Maria Montez and a few other actors remaining on their payroll. Abbott and Costello popularity was described as being "on the wane" in 1948 by film historian Gregory William Mank. They had not placed in the top Ten Box office lists since 1944. Producer Robert Arthur came up with an idea developing a script with veteran Abbott and Costello writers Frederic Rinaldo, Robert Lees and John Grant that would partner the duo with the Universal's monsters including Count Dracula, The Wolf Man and Frankenstein's Monster. Abbott and Costello initially were against the picture but were in need of money and eventually agreed. The film previewed at the Los Angeles Forum Theatre on June 25, 1948.

=== Undeveloped films ===
Robert Florey submitted a short treatment for The New Adventures of Frankenstein - The Monster Lives! in early 1932. It was rejected and returned to Florey in a few weeks. Universal staff writer Tom Reed wrote a treatment under the title The Return of Frankenstein, a title retained until filming began. Following its acceptance in 1933, Reed wrote a full script that was submitted to the Hays office for review. The script passed its review, but Whale, who by then had been contracted to direct, complained that "it stinks to heaven".

Wyllis Cooper, the creator of the radio show Lights Out, submitted an original screenplay for Son of Frankenstein that was initially rejected. This screenplay, which was dated October 20, 1938, involved Wolf, his wife Else and their young son Erwin arriving at Castle Frankenstein to claim their inheritance. Wolf's father's will stipulates the monster remain out of commission for at least 25 years following the watchtower explosion before any inheritance can be claimed. Cooper's original script had several other references to Bride of Frankenstein, including the finding of the skeletal remains of Doctor Septimus Pretorius and the Bride of Frankenstein. The script continues with the monster surviving the explosion and confronting Wolf to make a friend for him, and threatening to kill Else and Erwin if Wolf disobeys.

== Cast and crew ==
=== Recurring characters ===
Note on characters: The character named Elsa Frankenstein appearing in Son of Frankenstein (1939) is the wife of Wolf Frankenstein. In subsequent films The Ghost of Frankenstein (1942) and Frankenstein Meets the Wolf Man (1943), the character named Elsa Frankenstein (or Baroness Elsa Frankenstein) is introduced as the daughter of Ludwig Frankenstein (Wolf's younger brother), making her Ludwig's daughter and Wolf's niece. Consequently, these represent two distinct characters within the franchise continuity: the wife (maiden name separate) and the daughter/niece (born a Frankenstein).

List indicator

This section includes characters who will appear or have appeared in the series.

- An empty grey cell indicates the character was not in the film, or that the character's official presence has not yet been confirmed.

Character	Frankenstein	Bride of Frankenstein	Son of Frankenstein	The Ghost of Frankenstein	Frankenstein Meets the Wolf Man	House of Frankenstein	House of Dracula	Abbott and Costello Meet Frankenstein	Ref(s)
Character	1931	1935	1939	1942	1943	1944	1945	1948	Ref(s)
The Monster	Boris Karloff	Boris Karloff	Boris Karloff	Lon Chaney Jr.	Bela Lugosi	Glenn Strange	Glenn Strange	Glenn Strange	
Henry Frankenstein	Colin Clive	Colin Clive							
Elizabeth	Mae Clark	Valerie Hobson							
Hans	Francis Ford	Reginald Barlow							
Fritz	Dwight Frye								
Karl		Dwight Frye							
Ygor			Bela Lugosi	Bela Lugosi					
Elsa Frankenstein (wife of Wolf Frankenstein)			Josephine Hutchinson						
Baroness Elsa Frankenstein (daughter of Ludwig Frankenstein)				Evelyn Ankers	Ilona Massey				
Larry Talbot The Wolf Man					Lon Chaney Jr.	Lon Chaney Jr.	Lon Chaney Jr.	Lon Chaney Jr.	
Count Dracula						John Carradine	John Carradine	Bela Lugosi	

=== Crew ===
Crew	Frankenstein	Bride of Frankenstein	Son of Frankenstein	The Ghost of Frankenstein	Frankenstein Meets the Wolf Man	House of Frankenstein	House of Dracula	Abbott and Costello Meet Frankenstein	Ref(s)
Director	James Whale	James Whale	Rowland V. Lee	Erle C. Kenton	Roy William Neill	Erle C. Kenton	Erle C. Kenton	Charles T. Barton	
Producers	Carl Laemmle Jr.	Carl Laemmle Jr.	Rowland V. Lee	George Waggner	George Waggner	Paul Malvern	Paul Malvern	Robert Arthur	
Screenwriters	Garrett Fort, Francis Edward Faragoh, John Russell, Robert Florey	William Hurlbut	Willis Cooper	W. Scott Darling	Curt Siodmak	Edward T. Lowe	Edward T. Lowe	Robert Lees, Frederic I. Rinaldo, John Grant	
Cinematographer	Arthur Edeson	John J. Mescall	George Robinson	Milton Krasner, Elwood Bredell	George Robinson	George Robinson	George Robinson	Charles Van Enger	
Editors	Clarence Kolster, Maurice Pivar (Note: Clarence Kolster and Ted Kent are credited as the editors, respectively, while Maurice Pivar is credited as the supervising editor.)	Ted Kent, Maurice Pivar	Ted Kent	Ted Kent	Edward Curtiss	Philip Cahn	Russell Schoengarth	Frank Gross	
Art director	Charles D. Hall	Charles D. Hall	Jack Otterson	Jack Otterson	John B. Goodman	John B. Goodman	John B. Goodman, Martin Obzina	Bernard Herzbrun, Hilyard Brown	
Makeup	Jack P. Pierce	Jack P. Pierce	Jack P. Pierce	Jack P. Pierce	Jack P. Pierce	Jack P. Pierce and Otto Lederer	Jack P. Pierce and Joe Hadley	Bud Westmore	

== Reception and legacy ==
Hanke described the Frankenstein series as "the most famous, influential and important of all horror series". Gregory William Mank wrote in his book on the Universal's Frankenstein series in 1981 that "today, few film scholars would debate the fact that Universal Studio's Frankenstein films [...] constitute the most beloved horror film series every produced".

Several forms of media were influenced by the Frankenstein series. In the 1957, one of the highest-grossing films in the United Kingdom was The Curse of Frankenstein. When the director Terence Fisher was asked to compare his film to the original film by James Whale, Fisher responded "I wouldn't dream of comparing them!" and "[Whale's] was made some time ago. He did what he considered best. Everybody's right is to express themselves sin the way they want [...] His was probably a greater achievement in that it was the first one". The Munsters premiered in CBS on September 24, 1964, with make-up that resembled that of the Frankenstein monster from the Universal series. In 1974, Mel Brooks' film Young Frankenstein was released which parodied the original Universal film series. Brooks declared the film to be a "salute to James Whale and the wonderful directors of the past, and that beautiful black-and-white look". The script of the film by Gene Wilder resembles that of Son of Frankenstein and lampooned characters such as Ygor. The Spanish film The Spirit of the Beehive which won several European film festival honors owed material to the Frankenstein series. The film took place in 1940 in a small European village where a travelling film exhibitor shows them Whales Frankenstein. The small girls tease each other that the monster is real which leads to one of the girls searching for the monster in the countryside.

=== Proposed remakes ===
Universal Pictures has sought to remake Bride of Frankenstein on several occasions. While the novel Frankenstein has been adapted to film many times, Bride of Frankenstein's closest remake was the non-Universal film The Bride (1985), starring Sting, Clancy Brown, and Jennifer Beals. In 1991, the studio sought to remake the film for cable television with Martin Scorsese expressed interest in directing. In 1998, it was announced that Industrial Light & Magic were in production of a photorealistic full-length CGI animated sequel to the Bride of Frankenstein titled Frankenstein and the Wolfman.

In the first decade of the 21st century, Universal paired with Imagine Entertainment and contracted Shari Springer Berman and Robert Pulcini, who wrote the screenplay for American Splendor, to write a remake. The screenwriters set the story in contemporary New York. Jacob Estes was also involved with the project at one point and wrote a draft. In June 2009, Universal and Imagine entered discussions with director Neil Burger and his writing partner Dirk Wittenborn, and producer Brian Grazer was assigned to oversee the development of the remake.

In December 2015, Variety reported that David Koepp will write the script. By October 2017, it was reported that pre-production had begun when the creative team and studio decided to postpone the release in order to further work on the script with intentions being to improve the story. Javier Bardem and Angelina Jolie were still attached to the film as Frankenstein's monster and the film's reluctant bride, respectively. The same month Condon stated that should Jolie decide to leave the project, he would be interested in seeing Gal Gadot play the titular character. On November 8, Alex Kurtzman and Chris Morgan moved on to other projects, leaving the future of the Dark Universe in doubt. In November 2019, Condon reflected on the proposed Bride of Frankenstein remake not entering production. He stated: "That was a heartbreaker, really [...] the simplest way to say it is that I think The Mummy, and not to say anything against the movie, but the fact that that hadn't worked for them and it was the beginning of this whole reinvention of their monsters gave them cold feet at the end of the day. Because David Koepp was writing the script, I thought it was unbelievably good, and we were on the verge of making a really beautiful movie, I thought. So that was a shame". Later that same month, James Wan was announced to serve as producer on a reboot of the Frankenstein film series. On a 2020 episode of The Evolution of Horror podcast, Jason Blum expressed an interest in joining the production in a producing role. In March 2020, Robbie Thompson was hired to serve as screenwriter, with the plot revolving around a group of teenagers who discover that a neighbor is creating a monster in their basement. The project will be a joint production between Universal Pictures and Wan's Atomic Monster.

== See also ==
- Universal Classic Monsters
  - Dracula (Universal film series)
  - The Invisible Man (film series)
  - The Mummy (franchise)
  - The Wolf Man (franchise)
