= Ludwig Frankenstein =

- The Ghost of Frankenstein character
- Portrayed by: Cedric Hardwicke

In-universe information
- Gender: Male
- Family: Henry Frankenstein (father); Elizabeth Frankenstein (mother); Wolf Frankenstein (brother); Elsa Frankenstein (daughter); Peter Frankenstein (nephew)
- Status: Deceased
- Date of Birth: 1901

Ludwig Frankenstein is a fictional character who appears in the 1942 Universal horror film The Ghost of Frankenstein. He is played by Sir Cedric Hardwicke.

== History ==
Ludwig was the son of Henry Frankenstein and younger brother of Wolf Frankenstein. Living in the town of Visaria with his daughter, Elsa (evidently named after his sister-in-law), he is a medical doctor who specialized in brain surgery: specifically, in treating the mentally ill with the help of his colleagues Dr. Bohmer (Ludwig's mentor who was demoted to Ludwig's assistant following a tragic surgical mistake) and Dr. Kettering.

Following the apparent deaths of Ygor and Frankenstein's monster at the hands of Wolf Frankenstein in Son of Frankenstein, Wolf gave to Ludwig both his own scientific notes as well as those of their father. Not wanting the people of Visaria, much less his daughter, to know about the unsavory history of his family, Ludwig kept the medical records of his father and brother Wolf locked away, determined not to let the sins of his father and brother haunt him. But Ludwig did not know that Ygor and the Monster were still alive. By some unrevealed act, Ygor becomes aware of Ludwig Frankenstein and his apparent success as a medical doctor which he reasons could help heal the Monster. The two arrive Visaria, Ygor demanded that Ludwig use his special talents to heal the Monster's sick brain, or else he informs the townspeople of the doctor's secret of being the actual son of the infamous monster-making Frankenstein.

Initially, Ludwig agreed. After the Monster killed Dr. Kettering in an unprovoked fit of violence and tried to abduct Elsa, he angrily changed his mind and planned to destroy the creature by dissecting the creature. However, the spirit of Henry Frankenstein (also played by Hardwicke without a moustache since Colin Clive had died in 1937) appeared before his son and implored him to reconsider, persuading Ludwig to use his talent at brain surgery to simply give the Monster another brain to replace the abnormal criminal one. Perhaps Ludwig was merely hallucinating. In any case, he was properly inspired to do what his father wished. He made plans to remove the Monster's brain and replace it with that of Dr. Kettering, whom both he and Dr. Bohmer viewed as a model citizen. In so doing, Ludwig hoped that he would end the threat of the Monster forever and clear the Frankenstein family's name.

Ygor persuaded Bohmer (who was secretly jealous of his former student's success) to put his brain into the Monster's head and not Kettering's. When Ludwig tried to stop the Monster, Ludwig ends up mortally wounded. But when the Monster's body went blind, it calls for Bohmer where he finds that he can hear and feel him while not being able to see him. The wounded Ludwig states to Bohmer that the Monster's blood is actually the same as Kettering's blood and not the same as Ygor's blood. It won't feed the sensory nerves. The creature went berserk, killed Bohmer upon claiming that he was tricked, and destroyed Ludwig's laboratory while causing a fire...supposedly destroying itself, as well.

Ludwig was killed in the resulting fire as recounted by his daughter in the succeeding film Frankenstein Meets the Wolf Man.
