= House of Dracula =

1945 film by Erle C. Kenton

- Theatrical release poster
- Directed by: Erle C. Kenton
- Screenplay by: Edward T. Lowe
- Story by: George Bricker; Dwight V. Babcock
- Produced by: Paul Malvern
- Starring: Lon Chaney; Martha O'Driscoll; John Carradine; Lionel Atwill; Onslow Stevens; Glenn Strange; Jane Adams; Ludwig Stossel
- Cinematography: George Robinson
- Edited by: Russell Schoengarth
- Music by: Edgar Fairchild (music director)
- Production company: Universal Pictures Company, Inc.
- Distributed by: Universal Pictures Company, Inc.
- Release date: 7 December 1945
- Running time: 67 minutes
- Country: United States
- Language: English

House of Dracula is a 1945 American horror film released and distributed by Universal Pictures. Directed by Erle C. Kenton, the film features several Universal Horror properties meeting as they had done in the 1944 film House of Frankenstein. The film is based around Dr. Franz Edelmann, who is visited by both Count Dracula and Larry Talbot, who are trying to cure their vampirism and lycanthropy, respectively. Meanwhile, bewitched by Dracula, Edelmann becomes obsessed with reviving a catatonic Frankenstein's monster.

The film was developed initially with the title Wolf Man vs. Dracula to be directed by Ford Beebe with Bela Lugosi reprising his role of Count Dracula. After actor Boris Karloff returned for a two-film deal with Universal and several requests from the censorship board, the film was put on hold for nearly six months. House of Dracula went into production directed by Kenton with a screenplay by Edward T. Lowe, who took elements from the Wolf Man vs. Dracula script while adding in Frankenstein's monster (from Frankenstein) to the plot. Many cast and crew members returned from House of Frankenstein, including John Carradine in the role of Count Dracula, Glenn Strange as the monster, and Lon Chaney Jr. as both the Wolf Man and Larry Talbot. The film went into production on September 17, 1945, and finished on October 24. The film uses large sections of music from previous Universal feature films and footage, sets and props from other early Universal horror films. The film was released on December 7, 1945. Historian Gregory Mank described it as "the final serious entry of Universal's Frankenstein saga". It received predominantly negative reviews in its early New York screenings, while retrospective reviews have been predominantly lukewarm.

== Plot ==
Count Dracula arrives at the castle home of Dr. Franz Edelmann and explains he has come to Visaria to find a cure for his vampirism. Dr. Edelmann agrees to help, believing a series of blood transfusions may heal him. The doctor uses his own blood for the transfusions. Afterwards, the count has his coffin placed in the castle basement. That night, Lawrence Talbot arrives at the castle demanding to see Dr. Edelmann about a cure for his lycanthropy. Talbot is told to wait, but knowing the moon is rising, has himself incarcerated by the police. Inspector Holtz asks the doctor to see Talbot, and, as the full moon rises, they both witness his transformation into the Wolf Man. Edelmann and his assistant Milizia have him transferred to the castle the next morning. The doctor tells him he believes that moonlight does not trigger Talbot's transformations; it is pressure on the brain. He believes he can relieve the pressure and asks Talbot to wait while he gathers more spores from a plant he feels can cure him. Despondent at the thought of becoming the Wolf Man again, Talbot attempts suicide by jumping into the ocean, only to end up in a cave below the castle.

Edelmann finds Talbot in the cave, where they come across the catatonic Frankenstein's monster, still clutching the skeleton of Dr. Niemann. The humidity in the cave is perfect for propagating Clavaria formosa, and a natural tunnel in the cave connects to a basement of the castle. Dr. Edelmann takes the monster back to his lab, but considers reviving him to be too dangerous. Meanwhile, the count tries to seduce Milizia and make her a vampire, but Milizia wards him off with a cross. The doctor interrupts to explain he has found strange antibodies in the count's blood, requiring another transfusion. Edelmann's assistant Nina shadows Milizia and discovers that the count casts no reflection in a mirror. She warns Edelmann of the vampire's danger to Milizia. The doctor prepares a transfusion that will destroy the vampire. During the procedure, the count uses his hypnotic powers to put Edelmann and Nina to sleep. He reverses the flow of the transfusion, sending his own blood into the doctor's veins. When they wake, the count is carrying Milizia away. They revive Talbot and force the count away with a cross; Dracula returns to his coffin as the sun is rising. Edelmann follows him and drags the open coffin into the sunlight, destroying him.

The doctor begins reacting to Dracula's blood and finds he no longer casts a reflection in a mirror. Falling unconscious, he sees strange visions of a monstrous version of himself performing unspeakable acts. Edelmann awakens and tries to perform the operation on Talbot. The doctor begins transforming into a more monstrous personality and murders his gardener. When the townspeople discover the body, they chase Edelmann, believing him to be Talbot. They follow him to the castle, where Holtz and Steinmuhl interrogate Talbot and Edelmann. Steinmuhl is convinced the doctor is the murderer and assembles a mob to execute him. The operation cures Talbot, but Edelmann again turns into his monstrous self. The doctor revives Frankenstein's monster, with the others witnessing Edelmann's transformation. Edelmann breaks Nina's neck and throws her body into the cave. Holtz and Steinmuhl lead the townspeople to the castle, where the police attack the monster, but are subdued by the creature. The doctor kills Holtz by accidental electrocution, and Talbot shoots Edelmann dead. Talbot starts a fire that traps the monster and the townspeople flee the burning castle. The burning roof collapses on the monster.

== Cast ==
Cast adapted from the book Universal Horrors:

- Lon Chaney Jr. as Lawrence Stewart Talbot / The Wolf Man
- John Carradine as Count Dracula
- Martha O'Driscoll as Milizia Morelle
- Lionel Atwill as Inspector Holtz
- Onslow Stevens as Dr. Franz Edelmann
- Jane Adams as Nina
- Ludwig Stössel as Ziegfried
- Glenn Strange as Frankenstein's Monster
- Skelton Knaggs as Steinmuhl

== Production ==
=== Development ===
The first news of a follow-up to House of Frankenstein (1944) appeared in Hollywood trade papers in April 1944 with the announcement of a film titled Wolf Man vs. Dracula, the script of which differed greatly from that for House of Dracula. Bernard Schubert was hired to write the script and turned in his first draft on May 19. The film's director was to be Ford Beebe, who had worked on various horror related projects, including directing the film serial The Phantom Creeps (1939) and the features Night Monster (1942) and The Invisible Man's Revenge (1944), as well as producing Son of Dracula (1943). Unknown to Beebe, actor Boris Karloff had agreed to return to Universal Pictures for a two-film deal, which eventually became House of Frankenstein and The Climax (1944). This signing put Wolf Man vs. Dracula on hold to focus on House of Frankenstein, which was to begin shooting on April 4. Schubert completed a final shooting script for Wolf Man vs. Dracula dated November 30, 1944. The film's producer Paul Malvern had cuts made to it as ordered by Joseph Breen of the Motion Picture Producers and Distributors Association. The script's second draft had only minor variations, but the censors again requested several more cuts, leading to the production's cancellation and the script being shelved for nearly six months. Following the release of House of Frankenstein, Malvern hired that film's screenwriter, Edward T. Lowe, to rework the Wolf Man vs. Dracula script. Lowe's script, titled Destiny and dated April 13, 1945, read much closer to the final film of House of Dracula and now included Frankenstein's monster. By this point, Beebe had become busy with other film projects, so Erle C. Kenton took over as director. Two days later, Lowe delivered the next treatment, which now included new traits such as Nina being made a hunchback. Lowe rewrote the screenplay three more times, borrowing elements from previous films, like the violent reaction to a cat from Werewolf of London. During these re-writes, someone in production sent a memo to Lowe saying they "did not like the title Destiny and it should be more like the previous monster films - like House of Frankenstein - how about changing the name to House of Dracula?" Lowe was rewriting the script up to the eve of shooting the film.

House of Dracula is a continuation of the film House of Frankenstein and used much of that film's crew. Lowe is credited as the screenwriter. He based his screenplay on the uncredited story by George Bricker and Dwight V. Babcock. Despite being a follow-up, the script does not explain the resurrection of Count Dracula or the Wolf Man and moves Visaria's location to a cliff top on the seacoast. Elements of an earlier draft of a script dated September 20, 1945, features a scene where Edlemann examines a seven-year-old boy whose leg he has healed. Despite being cut, the finished film references this scene. Actor John Carradine commented that around the time the film's script was finished, soldiers were returning from World War II. Many families were dealing with relatives suffering from the horrors of war. This led to film studios "running scared from any type of horror film. The public now wanted musicals and light fantasy. The horror and monster company on the lot was reduced to what could be compared today as a weekly television soap opera or series". In 1986, Carradine said Universal in the 1940s "was like a factory anyway and there was little room for creative talent when it stood in the way of box office profits. The studio had little interest in making big budget pictures. It actually was very much the counterpoint of the television industry [in 1986]". Malvern echoed these statements in a later interview, noting that in the 1940s, Universal's structure was set up as a "forerunner of the modern day television production company".

=== Pre-production ===
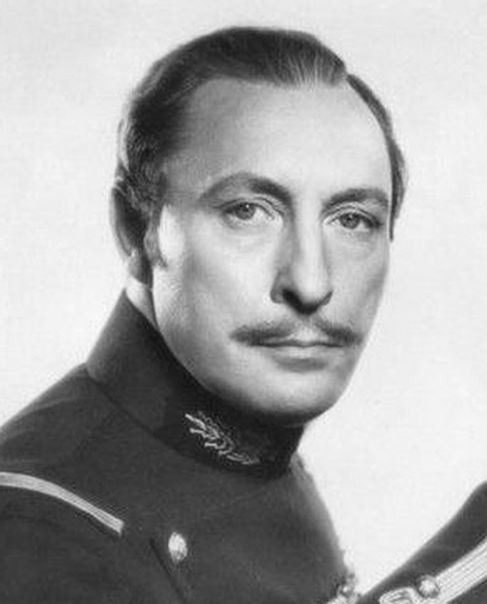
Lionel Atwill in 1943. House of Dracula would be among his final feature films and his fifth time in a Universal Frankenstein film.

The film was announced initially with Bela Lugosi reprising his role as Dracula. When asked why Lugosi did not perform in either House of Frankenstein or House of Dracula, Malvern said that "he probably was working at a different studio [...] lots of actors were now free lance and the Screen Actor's Guild had formed around 1937". Film historian Gregory William Mank said Lugosi was just completing work in Genius at Work (1946) and would have had time to join the cast; he apparently received no offer for the role. Carradine instead portrayed Dracula, reprising his role from House of Frankenstein. Carradine spoke about playing Dracula in 1986: "I pity anyone who plays the part", adding "The role holds a curse greater than Hamlet! Give the audience Richard III, Othello, The Merchant of Venice and what will they remember? A Vampyer!" Carradine said his portrayal of Dracula was to be "as evil as possible for I learned long ago that if I wanted to continue to eat, villains find steadier work than artists". Carradine commented the script made Dracula into "a type of dope fiend. Instead of existing as the traditional vampire, he now was seeking out the help of a doctor to cure him of his vampirism by the use of medical means", adding "he knows he is doing something wrong, and yet he cannot stop himself. In Stoker's day it was more sexual regression than drugs". On getting an actor for the role of the Monster, Malvern noted: "Lon was the Wolf Man, Lugosi was making pictures over at Monogram and Karloff wouldn't have played the monster again if it meant a million dollars". Glenn Strange portrayed the role of Frankenstein's monster as he had done in House of Frankenstein. Lionel Atwill signed on to play Inspector Holtz—his fifth appearance in a Universal Frankenstein film, after playing Inspector Krogh in Son of Frankenstein (1939), Dr. Boehmer in The Ghost of Frankenstein, the mayor in Frankenstein Meets the Wolf Man and Inspector Arnz in House of Frankenstein. Atwill died of bronchial cancer shortly after filming House of Dracula.

Martha O'Driscoll portrayed the lead female role of Mililza Morelle, Dr Edelmann's nurse. Driscoll had worked with Universal since 1937 in She's Dangerous. A new character added to the Frankenstein series in the film was Nina, the hunchbacked nurse, who was portrayed by Jane Adams. Adams was a former Conover model working in New York City with a background in arts. She met producer Walter Wanger, who asked her to come to Hollywood for a screen test for Salome Where She Danced (1945). She did not get the part but signed a contract with Universal. Adams believed it was her size that got her the role as Nina: "I'm only 5'3, and I think that's one reason I got into horror films, because I'm not the chorus girl type; rather short compared to the other girls who were under contract". Adams said she loved working at Universal and doing character parts, finding everyone she worked with "very congenial". Many crew members on The House of Frankenstein returned for House of Dracula. These included executive producer Joseph Gershenson, director Erle C. Kenton, and screenwriter Lowe. Malvern said that he and Kenton "got along beautifully", adding "[h]e was one director who thought everything out and made sure that he came in on budget and on time. He wasn't real fond of directing the Abbott and Costello films so he got a kick out of the monster films". The film's cinematographer was George Robinson, who had previously worked on Universal's Son of Frankenstein, Frankenstein Meets the Wolfman, House of Frankenstein and the Spanish-language version of Dracula (1931).

=== Filming ===
The film began production on September 17, 1945. A scene involving Glenn Strange rising from quicksand holding the skeleton of Dr. Niemann from House of Frankenstein was difficult for the actor, who recalled it was extremely cold. Strange said Chaney had offered him some alcohol which warmed him up, and after shooting he rushed to his dressing room, which had a roaring fire. Following the removal of his monster make-up, Strange said he was "so looped I could hardly get up. I got warm and then I got tight. But I think [Chaney] just about saved my life that day".

According to Malvern, the budget for sets was $5,000. To save on lumber and nails for the war effort, existing props and sets from films such as The Invisible Woman and The Mummy's Hand were reused. Several scenes from previous Universal horror films were reused in House of Dracula, including the dream sequence that lifts parts of Bride of Frankenstein (1935); sequences from The Ghost of Frankenstein's fiery climax reappear in the burning of Edelmann's castle. The film's score reuses pieces from Black Friday, Man-Made Monster, The Wolf Man, The Ghost of Frankenstein, Frankenstein Meets the Wolfman, House of Frankenstein, The Scarlet Claw, and The Invisible Man's Revenge. Shooting of House of Dracula finished on October 25.

== Release ==
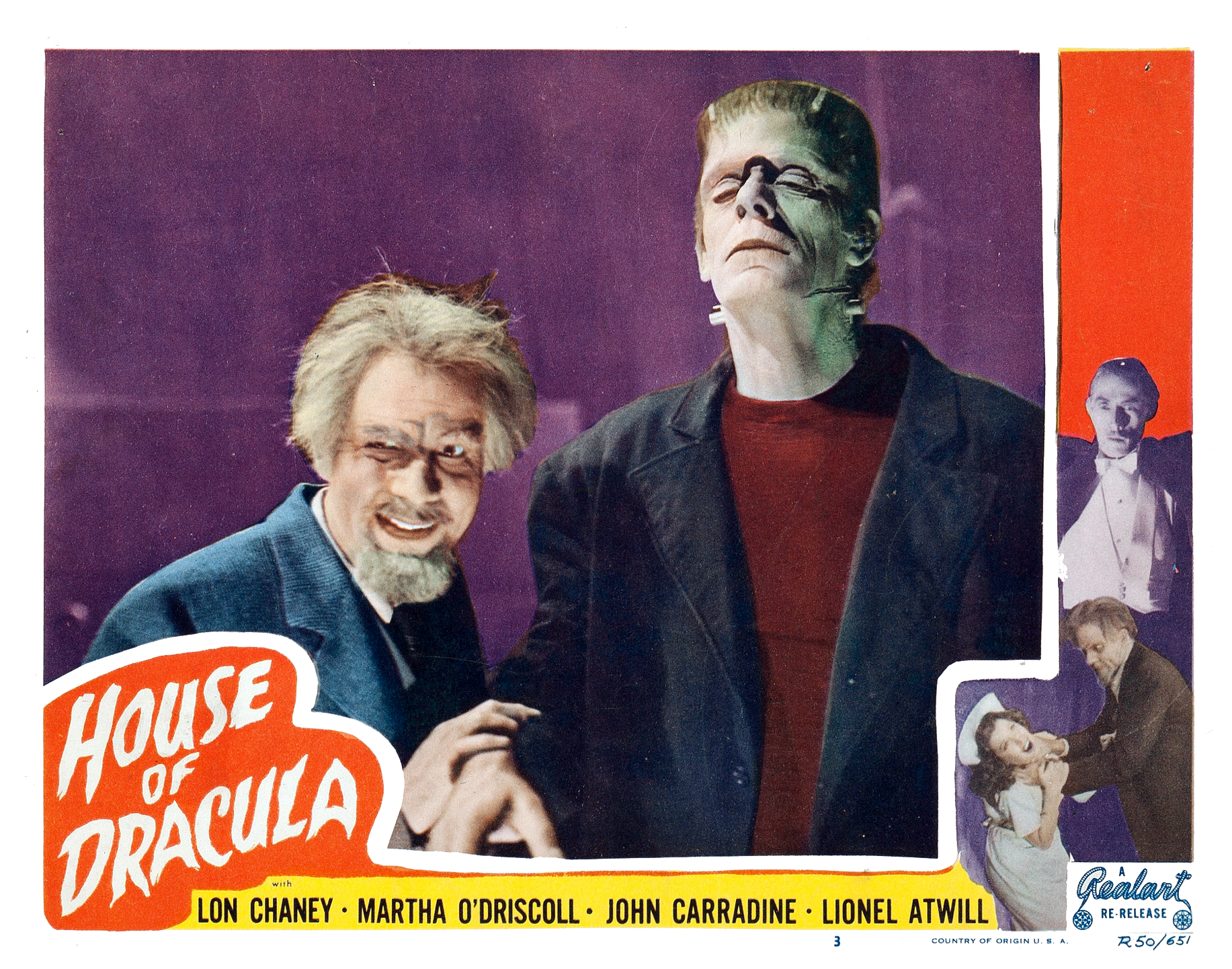
Re-release lobby card for House of Dracula featuring Onslow Stevens as Dr. Franz Edelmann after the blood transfusion with Count Dracula.

Prior to a public theatrical release, House of Dracula was previewed at Universal on November 28, 1945. The Universal Pictures Company distributed House of Dracula, which opened on December 7, at the Rivoli Theatre in New York. It was later shown at New York's Rialto Theatre on December 21. At the film's screenings on the West Coast of the United States, House of Dracula was a double bill with The Daltons Ride Again (1945), a western also featuring Chaney. The 1946 National Box Office Digest Annual placed House of Dracula earnings between $250,000 to $500,000 in 1945. It was not the highest-grossing film from Universal that year; that honor went to Lady on a Train (1945), which grossed over $500,000. The film performed worse financially than other horror films of the year, such as The Picture of Dorian Gray (1945), but earned more than RKO's Isle of the Dead, The Body Snatcher and Zombies on Broadway.

MCA/Universal released House of Dracula on VHS in 1993. The film was released on DVD in 2004 in a set titled The Legacy Collection, which also included Dracula (1931), the Spanish-language Dracula (1931), Dracula's Daughter (1936) and Son of Dracula. The film was released on Blu-ray on May 16, 2017, as part of the Dracula: Complete Legacy Collection set.

== Reception ==
In contemporary reviews, Jack D. Grant of The Hollywood Reporter reviewed the film at the Universal preview, describing it as showing "the realms of pseudo-science interestingly invaded", adding, "the squeamish proceedings [were] given steady pace under the knowing direction of Erle C. Kenton". Grant noted that "the greatest burden of acting is asked of Onslow Stevens [...] he performs his chores to excellent effects". William Brogdon of Variety also reviewed the November 28th screening, commenting that the cast turn in "generally first rate work" that has "more or less become standard", and that "settings, music, photography all contribute to necessary atmospheric mood". Mank noted New York film critics disliked the film. Otis L. Guernsey Jr. of The New York Herald-Tribune found that Universal was "substituting quantity for imagination", while Dorothy Masters of The New York Daily News gave the film a one and half star rating, proclaiming that it was "positively guaranteed not to scare the pants off of anybody" and adding that "unfortunately, the film hasn't the capacity of being funny either, and is often the case when synthetic horror becomes too rambunctious". More negative reviews came from Harrison's Reports, which found it "more ludicrous than terrifying" adding "much happens, but nothing that will surprise anyone". Only a review in the New York World-Telegram was positive, describing the film as good fun.

Outside of New York, The Motion Picture Herald gave it a lukewarm review, which declared the "film fulfills the requirements for a satisfactory horror picture", while the Motion Picture Exhibitor found the film to have "plenty of suspense, dark dungeons and satisfactory performances by the entire cast". Reviewing the double feature with The Daltons Ride Again, Lowell E. Redelings of The Hollywood Citizen-News declared that the film is "not high-budget film fare, nor was it meant to be. Yet both films are so nicely done that this new bill is corking good entertainment", adding "if all double bills were as good as this one, there would be few complaints".

In later critical analysis, Carlos Clarens wrote about the Monster Rally films in his book An Illustrated History of the Horror Film (1967) summarizing that "the sole charm of these films resides in the very proficient contract players that populated them, portraying gypsies, mad scientists, lustful high priests, vampire-killers, or mere red herrings". John Brosnan wrote in his book The Horror People (1976) that both House of Dracula and House of Frankenstein were "interesting curiosities" and that House of Dracula was "the better of the two with plenty of gothic atmosphere and some impressive moments that helped one ignore the absurd plot". Bruce Eder commented on a home video release of the film in 1994 finding that both were "great fun" but "curiously, House of Dracula - which is padded with a lot of footage from earlier films - is the more interesting of the two", noting its more interesting premise and that the "characterizations were interesting and the film makes excellent use of shadows". Craig Butler of the online film database AllMovie found that while the film had an interesting premise, the idea was not developed efficiently and that "coincidence runs rampant, further erasing the delicate 'believability' line that is so difficult to maintain in supernatural flics". The review noted the film had "very little horror", with one exception being the "marvelous sequence involving Dracula and his intended victim, the latter seated at the piano and playing 'Moonlight Sonata' as the good Count begins to work his spell upon her".

== Legacy ==
Mank describes House of Dracula as "the final serious entry of Universal's Frankenstein saga". On November 28, 1945, Universal joined with British entrepreneur J. Arthur Rank, who bought one-fourth interest in the studio. In 1946, Universal reported a profit of only $4.6 million. They responded by dropping many actors from their contract roster. On July 31, 1946, an official merger began. The company, now called Universal–International, had only Deanna Durbin, Abbott and Costello, Maria Montez and a few other actors remaining on their payroll. House of Dracula was the final time make-up artist Jack Pierce would create the make-up for the Wolf Man, Dracula and Frankenstein's monster, as Universal released him in 1947.

Chaney and Strange appeared in several films and television series, including reprising the roles of Larry Talbot and Frankenstein's monster in Universal-International's Abbott and Costello Meet Frankenstein (1948). Chaney appeared again as a werewolf in the Mexican production La Casa del Terror. Carradine reprised the role of Dracula on stage, television and in several low-budget feature films.

== See also ==
- John Carradine filmography
- List of horror films of the 1940s
- List of Universal Pictures films (1940–1949)
