= Dwight Frye =

American actor (1899–1943)

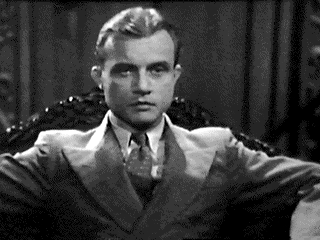
- in A Strange Adventure (1932)
- Born: Dwight Iliff Fry; February 22, 1899; Salina, Kansas, U.S.
- Died: November 7, 1943 (aged 44); Los Angeles, California, U.S.
- Resting place: Forest Lawn Memorial Park (Glendale)
- Occupation: Actor
- Years active: 1917–1943
- Spouse: Laura Mae Bullivant (m. 1928)
- Children: 1

Dwight Iliff Frye (born Fry; February 22, 1899 – November 7, 1943) was an American character actor of stage and screen. He is best known for his portrayals of neurotic, murderous villains in several classic Universal horror films, such as Renfield in Dracula (1931) and Fritz in Frankenstein (1931).

== Biography ==
=== Early life and career ===
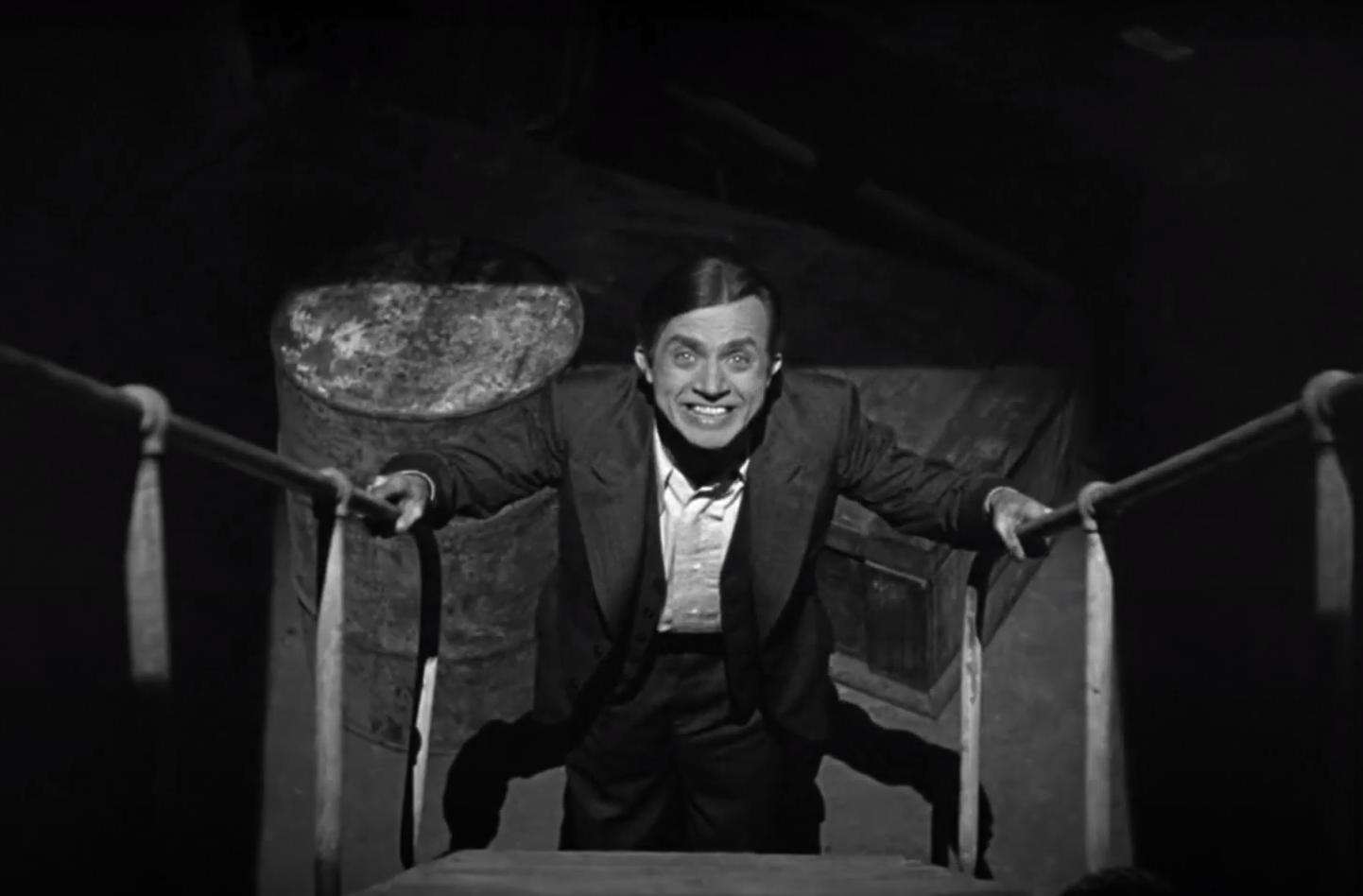
As Renfield in Dracula (1931)

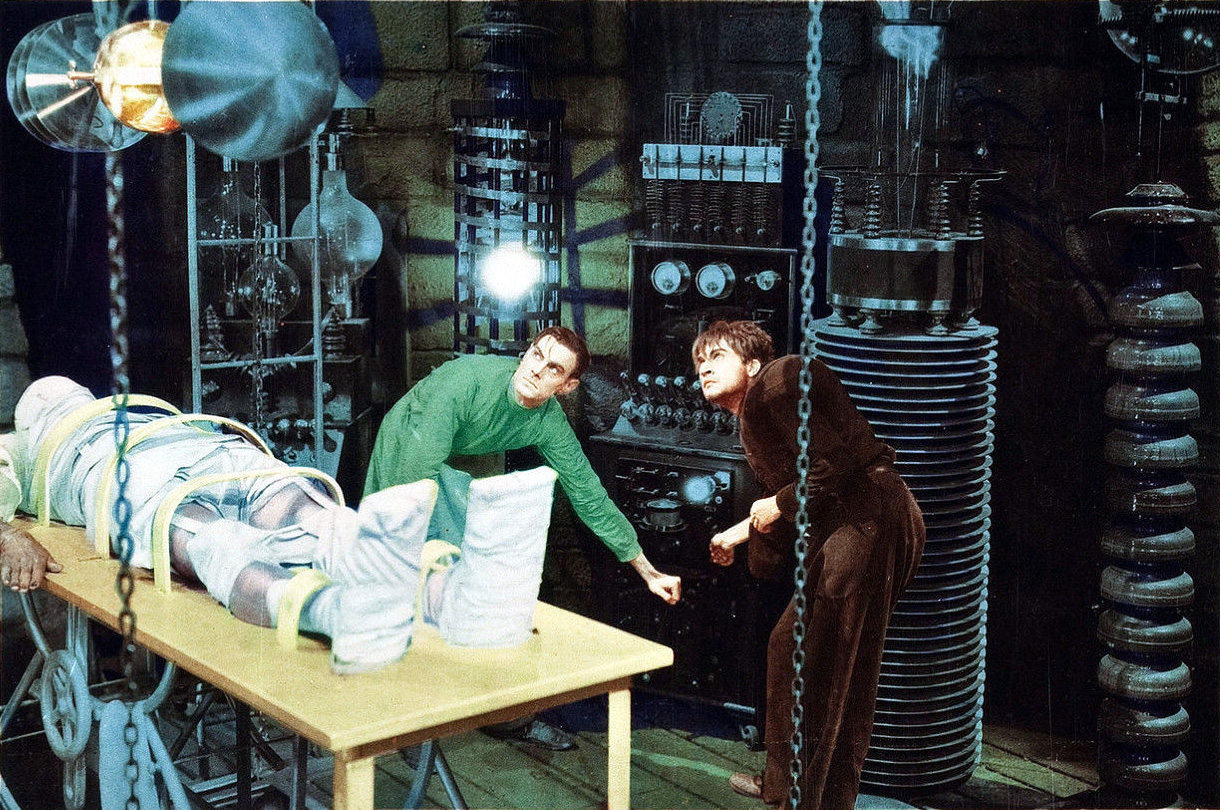
Boris Karloff, Colin Clive and Frye in Frankenstein (1931)

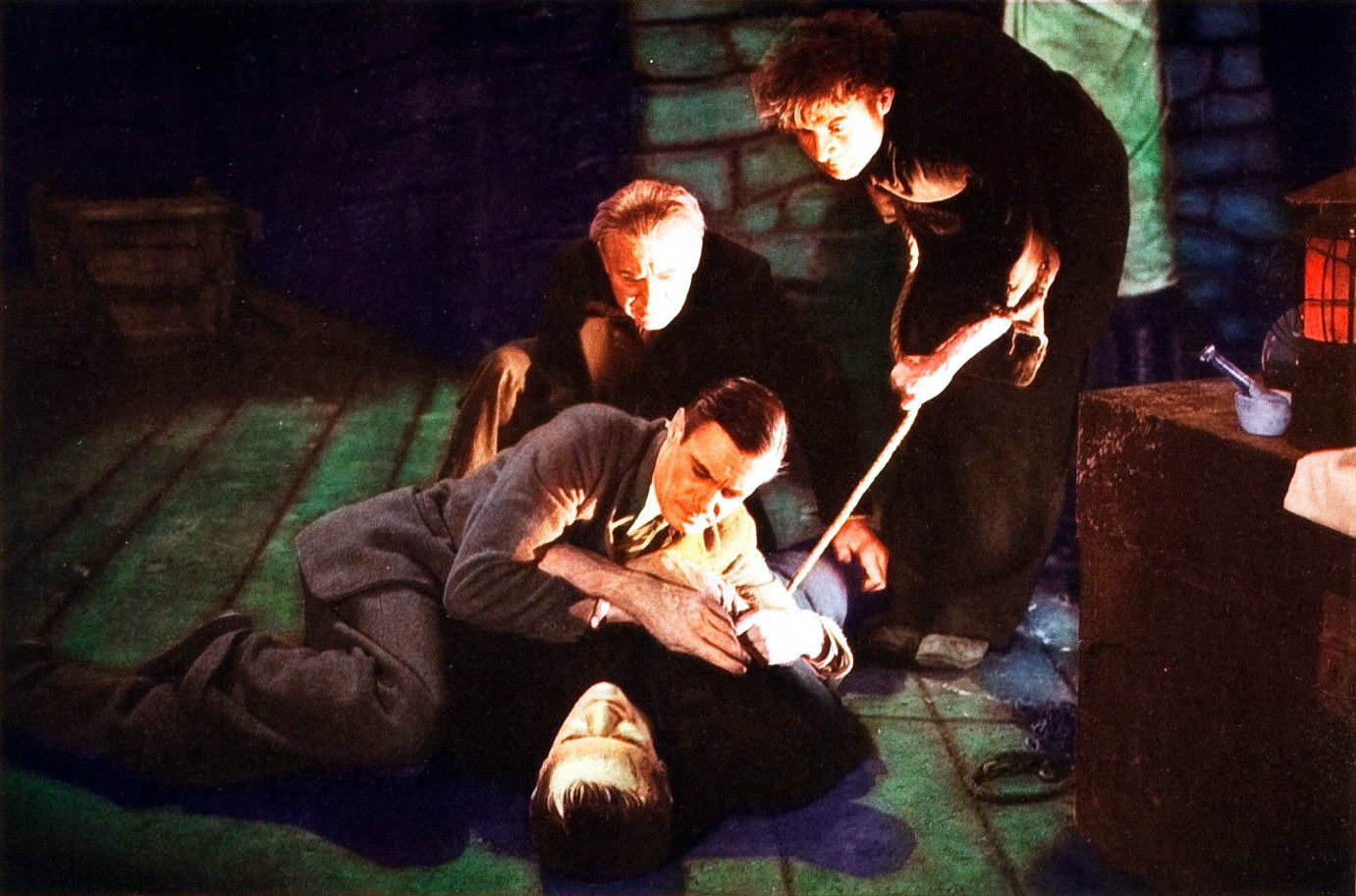
Boris Karloff, Colin Clive, Edward Van Sloan and Frye in Frankenstein (1931)

Video of re-release trailer for Dracula (1931)

Frye was born in Salina, Kansas, and studied for a career in music and first appeared as a concert pianist. In the 1920s, he made his name as a stage actor, often in comedies. In 1924, he played the Son in a production of Luigi Pirandello's Six Characters in Search of an Author.

While he had a few minor comedic roles in silent pictures, with the coming of sound Frye soon became known for playing villains. Frye specialized in the portrayal of mentally unbalanced characters, including his signature role, the madman Renfield in Tod Browning's 1931 version of Dracula.

Later that same year, he played the hunchbacked assistant Fritz in Frankenstein and Wilmer Cook (the "gunsel") in the first film version of Dashiell Hammett's The Maltese Falcon. He had a featured role in the horror film The Vampire Bat (1933) in which he played Herman, a half-wit suspected of being a killer. He had memorable roles in The Invisible Man (1933) as a reporter, and in The Crime of Dr. Crespi (1935).

In Bride of Frankenstein (1935), he played Karl. The part was originally much more substantive; many of Frye's additional scenes were part of a subplot but were cut to shorten the running time and appease the censors. One of the deleted scenes was that of Karl killing a Burgomaster, portrayed by E. E. Clive. Nothing remains of those scenes except still photographs included in a Universal Studios DVD release of the film. He played prominent townspeople in The Ghost of Frankenstein (1942) and Frankenstein Meets the Wolf Man (1943); another appearance in Son of Frankenstein (1939) was deleted prior to release. Also in the 1930s, he appeared in two films starring James Cagney: The Doorway to Hell (1930), as a hit man, and Something to Sing About (1937), as a fussy hairdresser.

During the early 1940s, Frye alternated between film roles and appearing on stage in a variety of productions ranging from comedies to musicals, as well as appearing in a stage version of Dracula. During World War II, he made a contribution to the war effort by working nights as a tool designer for Douglas Aircraft.

=== Death ===
On November 7, 1943, Frye died of a heart attack at the age of 44 while travelling by bus in Hollywood, a few days before he was scheduled to begin filming the biopic Wilson. His funeral service was in West Hollywood's Utter-McKinley Mortuary. He was buried in Glendale's Forest Lawn Memorial Park three days later.

=== Musical tribute ===
American rock band Alice Cooper wrote and recorded a tribute track to Dwight Frye entitled "The Ballad of Dwight Fry" (intentionally dropping the last "e") that was included on their 1971 LP Love It to Death. On stage, this song would be portrayed with Cooper in a straitjacket trying to escape, and finally breaking free at the end of the song to strangle the nurse with the ties.

Devil Doll's 1990 album, Eliogabalus, features the photographed likeness of Dwight Frye in one of its booths.

SNFU's 1991 compilation album The Last of the Big Time Suspenders features artwork of Dwight Frye as his "Renfield" character on the front cover.

== Filmography ==
Year	Title	Role	Notes
1926	Exit Smiling	Balcony Heckler	Uncredited
1927	Upstream	Theatre Audience Spectator	Uncredited
1928	The Night Bird	Party Guest	Uncredited
1930	The Doorway to Hell	Gangster	
1930	Man to Man	Vint Glade	
1931	Dracula	R. M. Renfield	
1931	The Maltese Falcon	Wilmer Cook	
1931	The Black Camel	Jessup, The Butler	Uncredited
1931	Frankenstein	Fritz	
1932	Attorney for the Defense	James Wallace	
1932	By Whose Hand?	Chick	
1932	The Western Code	Dick Loomis	
1932	A Strange Adventure	Robert Wayne	
1933	The Vampire Bat	Herman Gleib	
1933	The Circus Queen Murder	Flandrin	
1933	The Invisible Man	Reporter	Uncredited
1935	Bride of Frankenstein	Karl	
1935	Atlantic Adventure	"Spike" Jonas	
1935	The Crime of Dr. Crespi	Dr. Thomas	
1935	The Great Impersonation	Roger Unthank	Uncredited
1936	Tough Guy	Mack	Uncredited
1936	Florida Special	Jenkins	
1936	Alibi for Murder	McBride	
1936	Beware of Ladies	Swanson	
1936	Great Guy	Minor Role	Uncredited
1937	Sea Devils	SS Paradise Radio Operator	Uncredited
1937	The Man Who Found Himself	Hysterical Patient	
1937	The Road Back	Small Man At Rally	Uncredited
1937	Renfrew of the Royal Mounted	Desk Clerk	Uncredited
1937	Something to Sing About	Mr. Easton	
1937	Danger Patrol	Man On Telephone	Uncredited
1937	The Shadow	Vindecco	
1938	Who Killed Gail Preston?	Mr. Owen	
1938	Invisible Enemy	Alex	
1938	Sinners in Paradise	Marshall	Uncredited
1938	Fast Company	Sidney Z. Wheeler	
1938	The Night Hawk	John Colley	
1938	Adventure in Sahara	Gravet / "The Jackal"	Uncredited
1939	Son of Frankenstein	Villager	Unconfirmed
1939	The Man in the Iron Mask	Fouquet's Valet	Uncredited
1939	Mickey the Kid	Bruno, The Henchman	Uncredited
1939	Conspiracy	Lieutenant Keller	Uncredited
1940	I Take This Woman	Gus	(scenes deleted)
1940	Drums of Fu Manchu	Professor Anderson	Serial, [Ch.5]
1940	Gangs of Chicago	"Pinky"	
1940	Phantom Raiders	Eddie Anders	
1940	Sky Bandits	Speavy	
1940	The Son of Monte Cristo	Pavlov's Secretary	Uncredited
1941	The People vs. Dr. Kildare	Jury Foreman	Uncredited
1941	Mystery Ship	Rader	
1941	Flying Blind	Leo Qualen	
1941	The Blonde from Singapore	Barber	Uncredited
1941	The Devil Pays Off	Radio Operator	Uncredited
1942	Sleepytime Gal	Second Mug	Uncredited
1942	The Ghost of Frankenstein	Villager	Uncredited
1942	Danger in the Pacific	Desk Clerk	Uncredited
1943	Dead Men Walk	Zolarr	
1943	Submarine Alert	Haldine, Fifth Columnist	Uncredited
1943	Frankenstein Meets the Wolf Man	Rudi	
1943	Hangmen Also Die!	Hostage	Uncredited
1943	Dangerous Blondes	Hoodlum	Uncredited

== Sources ==
- Gregory W. Mank; Dwight D. Frye; James Coughlin (1997). Dwight Frye's Last Laugh. Midnight Marquee. ISBN 1-887664-11-4.
