= Donnie Dunagan =

American actor (1934–2026)

- Dunagan in 2024
- Born: Donald Roan Dunagan; August 16, 1934; San Antonio, Texas, U.S.
- Died: November 4, 2026 (aged 92); San Angelo, Texas, U.S.
- Occupation: Actor
- Years active: 1938–1945
- Known for: Original voice of Young Bambi in Walt Disney's Bambi (1942)
- Military career
- Allegiance: United States
- Branch: U.S. Marine Corps
- Service years: 1952–1977
- Rank: Major
- Conflicts: Korean War; Vietnam War
- Awards: Bronze Star; Purple Heart

Donald Roan Dunagan (August 16, 1934 – November 4, 2026) was an American actor and U.S. Marine Corps major. As a child actor, he was best known for portraying the young son of Basil Rathbone's Baron Frankenstein in Son of Frankenstein (1939) and for providing the voice of young Bambi in Bambi (1942).

== Life and career ==
Donald Roan Dunagan was born on August 16, 1934, in San Antonio, Texas, but his family soon moved to Memphis, Tennessee, where they struggled with poverty due to the Great Depression. There, when he was at the age of three-and-a-half, he won a talent contest prize of $100. Spotted by a studio talent scout, the family moved to Hollywood, where Dunagan appeared in a series of films and soon became his family's main breadwinner. After he provided the voice for the titular character in Walt Disney's Bambi (1942) at the age of 8, he quit acting. As they were all recorded separately, he did not meet Peter Behn, the voice of Thumper the rabbit, and Stan Alexander, the voice of Flower the skunk, until more than 70 years after the film's production.

By the age of 13, Dunagan lived in a boarding house and worked as a lathe operator. In 1952, at the age of 18, he enlisted in the Marine Corps. He became the youngest drill instructor in the history of the Corps and served three tours in Vietnam, where he was wounded several times, before finally retiring with the rank of major in 1977.

For Dunagan's service he received a Bronze Star and three Purple Hearts. Dunagan kept his acting career a secret while serving in the Marines, but was eventually revealed shortly before his retirement. In 2004, he was located and interviewed by horror film historian Tom Weaver in a special "Donnie Dunagan issue" of Video Watchdog magazine.

Dunagan was retired and lived in San Angelo, Texas, with his wife, Dana. He died from lung cancer on November 4, 2026, at the age of 92.

== Filmography ==
- Mother Carey's Chickens (1938) as Peter Carey (film debut)
- Son of Frankenstein (1939) as Peter von Frankenstein
- The Forgotten Woman (1939) as Terry Kennedy Jr.
- Tower of London (1939) as Baby Prince
- Vigil in the Night (1940) as Tommy (uncredited)
- Meet the Chump (1941) as Little Boy (uncredited)
- Bambi (1942) as Young Bambi (voice, uncredited)

== Awards and decorations ==
- Bronze Star
- Purple Heart (×3)
- Navy and Marine Corps Commendation Medal w/Combat V
- Army Commendation Medal
