= Josephine Hutchinson =

American actress (1903–1998)

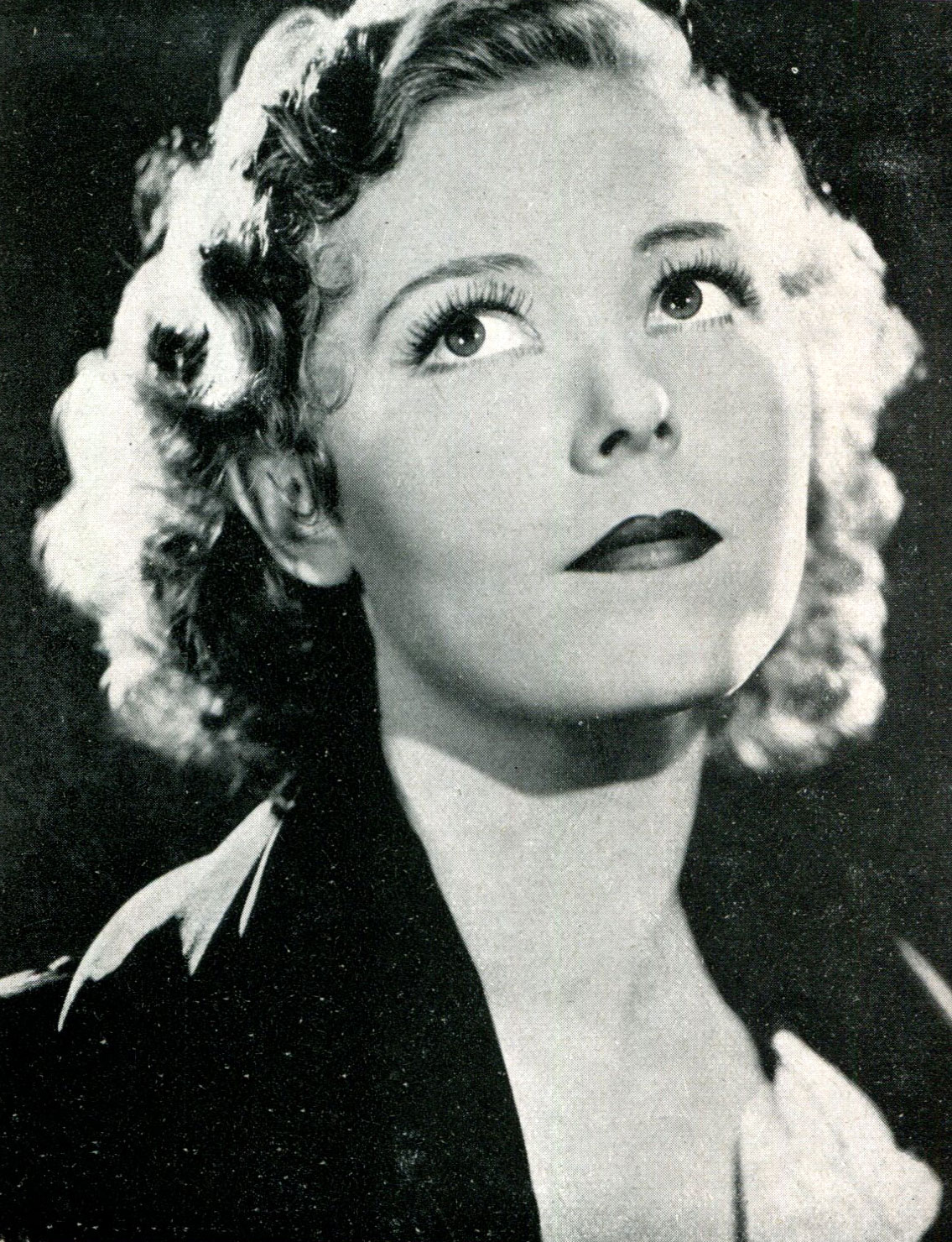
- Hutchinson in 1934
- Born: October 12, 1903; Seattle, Washington, U.S.
- Died: June 4, 1998 (aged 94); New York City, U.S.
- Education: Cornish College of the Arts
- Occupation: Actress
- Years active: 1917–1974
- Spouses: Robert W. Bell (m. 1924; div. 1930) James F. Townsend (m. 1935; died 1970) Staats Cotsworth (m. 1972; died 1979)
- Mother: Leona Roberts

Josephine Hutchinson (October 12, 1903 – June 4, 1998) was an American actress. She acted in dozens of theater plays and dozens of films, including The Story of Louis Pasteur (1936), Son of Frankenstein (1939), Somewhere in the Night (1946), Ruby Gentry (1952), and North by Northwest (1959), as well as numerous television appearances as guest star in various series including The Twilight Zone.

== Early years ==
Hutchinson was born in Seattle, Washington. Her mother, Leona Roberts, was an actress best known for her role as Mrs. Meade in Gone with the Wind.

== Career ==
=== Film ===
Through her mother's connections, Hutchinson made her film debut at the age of 13 in The Little Princess (1917), starring Mary Pickford. She later attended the Cornish School in Seattle, receiving a diploma in 1929. She moved to New York City, where she began acting in theater. By the late 1920s, she was one of the actors able to make the transition from silent movies to talkies.

Under contract with Warner Bros., Hutchinson went to Hollywood in 1934, debuting that year in Happiness Ahead, starring opposite Dick Powell. She was featured on the cover of Film Weekly on August 23, 1935, and appeared in The Story of Louis Pasteur in 1936. At Universal, she again played the leading lady, Elsa von Frankenstein, in one of her more memorable roles alongside actors Basil Rathbone, Boris Karloff and Bela Lugosi in Son of Frankenstein (1939).

In 1957's Gun for a Coward, she was cast as the mother of Fred MacMurray's character, although only five years MacMurray's senior. She later played the sister of the villainous Vandamm, posing as "Mrs. Townsend", in North by Northwest (1959) and Mrs. Macaboy in Love Is Better Than Ever, starring Elizabeth Taylor.

=== Stage ===
Hutchinson's Broadway debut came in The Bird Cage (1925). Her other Broadway credits included The Cherry Orchard (1933), Alice in Wonderland (1932), Dear Jane (1932), Alison's House (1931), Camille (1931), Alison's House (1930), The Women Have Their Way (1930), The Living Corpse (1929), Mademoiselle Bourrat (1929), The Cherry Orchard (1929), The Seagull (1929), Peter Pan (1928), The Cherry Orchard (1928), Hedda Gabler (1928), Improvisations in June (1928), The First Stone (1928), 2 x 2 = 5 (1927), The Good Hope (1927), Inheritors (1927), The Cradle Song (1927), Twelfth Night (1926), The Unchastened Woman (1926), and A Man's Man (1925).

=== Television ===
On television, she made four guest appearances on Perry Mason. In 1958, she played Leona Walsh in "The Case of the Screaming Woman". In 1959, she played murderer Miriam Baker in "The Case of the Spanish Cross". In 1961, she played Miss Sarah McKay in "The Case of the Barefaced Witness", and in 1962, she played Amelia Corning in "The Case of the Mystified Miner". In 1959, she played Mrs Crale in the 1959 Gunsmoke episode "Johnny Red." She played the Reverend Mother Sister Ellen in the 1967 episode "Ladies From St. Louis".

In the 1960 The Rifleman episode S2 E31 "The Prodigal", she played Christine, the mother of outlaw Billy St. John. Also in 1960 she appeared on Wagon Train S3 E21 "The Tom Tuckett Story" as Miss Stevenson. She appeared in The Real McCoys in 1961 in the episode "September Song." In 1962, she appeared on Rawhide, in the episode "Grandma's Money" and on The Twilight Zone in the episode "I Sing the Body Electric” (S3 E35). In March 1963, Hutchinson appeared in an episode of GE True, entitled "The Black-Robed Ghost".

In 1970 Bonanza (S12E9) "Love Child", she played Martha Randolph. In 1971, Hutchinson appeared in The Waltons' television movie The Homecoming: A Christmas Story, in which she played Mamie Baldwin, one half of a sister duo who made moonshine whiskey. In 1974, in Little House on the Prairie (S1E6) "If I Should Wake Before I Die", she played Amy Hearn.

Hutchinson continued to work steadily through the 1970s in film, radio, and television, establishing a solid career in supporting roles.

== Personal life ==
On August 12, 1924, Hutchinson married Robert W. Bell, a stage director, in Washington, D.C. In 1926, she met the actress Eva Le Gallienne, and became a member of Le Gallienne's Civic Repertory Theatre company. By 1927, the two women were involved in an affair. Hutchinson and Bell, who separated in 1928, were divorced in 1930. The press quickly dubbed her Le Gallienne's "shadow", a term which at the time meant lesbian. Both actresses survived the scandal and carried on with their respective careers.

Hutchinson married three times and had no children. She married James F. Townsend in 1935; they later divorced. Her final marriage was to actor Staats Cotsworth in 1972; he died in 1979.

== Death ==
She died, aged 94, on June 4, 1998, at the Florence Nightingale Nursing Home in Manhattan. Her ashes were scattered near her niece's home at Springfield, Oregon.

== Select filmography ==
- The Little Princess (1917) (uncredited)
- Happiness Ahead (1934) as Joan Bradford
- The Right to Live (1935) as Stella Trent
- Oil for the Lamps of China (1935) as Hester
- The Melody Lingers On (1935) as Ann Prescott
- The Story of Louis Pasteur (1936) as Marie Pasteur
- I Married a Doctor (1936) as Carol Kennicott
- Mountain Justice (1937) as Ruth Harkins
- The Women Men Marry (1937) as Jane Carson
- The Crime of Doctor Hallet (1938) as Dr. Mary Reynolds
- Son of Frankenstein (1939) as Elsa Von Frankenstein
- My Son, My Son! (1940) as Nellie (Moscrop) Essex
- Tom Brown's School Days (1940) as Mrs. Mary Arnold
- Her First Beau (1941) as Mrs. Wood
- Somewhere in the Night (1946) as Elizabeth Conroy
- Cass Timberlane (1947) as Lillian Drover
- The Tender Years (1948) as Emily Norris
- Adventure in Baltimore (1949) as Mrs. Lilly Sheldon
- Love Is Better Than Ever (1952) as Mrs. Macaboy
- Ruby Gentry (1952) as Letitia Gentry
- Many Rivers to Cross (1955) as Mrs. Cherne
- Miracle in the Rain (1956) as Agnes Wood
- Gun for a Coward (1957) as Mrs. Keough
- Sing, Boy, Sing (1958) as Caroline Walker
- Step Down to Terror (1958) as Mrs. Sarah Walters
- North by Northwest (1959) as Mrs. Townsend
- Walk Like a Dragon (1960) as Ma Bartlett
- The Adventures of Huckleberry Finn (1960) as Widow Douglas
- Baby the Rain Must Fall (1965) as Mrs. Ewing
- Nevada Smith (1966) as Mrs. Elvira McCanles
- Rabbit, Run (1970) as Mrs. Angstrom, Rabbit's mother
- The Homecoming: A Christmas Story (1971) as Mamie Baldwin
