= Frankenstein Meets the Wolf Man =

1943 US horror film directed by Roy William Neill

- Theatrical release poster
- Directed by: Roy William Neill
- Screenplay by: Curt Siodmak
- Produced by: George Waggner
- Starring: Ilona Massey; Patric Knowles; Bela Lugosi; Lionel Atwill; Maria Ouspenskaya; Lon Chaney Jr.
- Cinematography: George Robinson
- Edited by: Edward Curtiss
- Production company: Universal Pictures Company, Inc.
- Distributed by: Universal Pictures Company, Inc.
- Release dates: 5 March 1943 (New York); 12 March 1943 (United States)
- Running time: 72 minutes
- Country: United States
- Language: English

Frankenstein Meets the Wolf Man is a 1943 American horror film directed by Roy William Neill and starring Lon Chaney Jr. as Larry Talbot (the Wolf Man) and Bela Lugosi as Frankenstein's monster. The script, written by Curt Siodmak, follows The Ghost of Frankenstein (1942) and The Wolf Man (1941), though with a number of retcons. Most significantly, Talbot only transforms into werewolf form during a full moon (rather than every night while wolfsbane is in bloom, as in The Wolf Man), which became a standard part of werewolf lore. The film involves Larry Talbot, who is resurrected when his tomb is disturbed. His search for a way to end his seeming immortality leads to his befriending Frankenstein's monster.

Developed under the title Wolf Man Meets Frankenstein, the film was to have Chaney portray both Frankenstein's monster and the Wolf Man, an idea that was halted before production began because of the physical toll it would take on the actor. The script was filmed with the monster having lines of dialogue, which were removed after the production staff laughed at Bela Lugosi's delivery of the lines during a studio pre-screening. The film was released to what the authors of the book Universal Horrors described as "lukewarm reviews". The film was the first of a number of films that were later described as "monster rallies", involving having name-brand monsters interact with each other. Universal would follow this with House of Frankenstein (1944) and House of Dracula (1945).

== Plot ==
Four years after the events of The Wolf Man and The Ghost of Frankenstein, two graverobbers break into the Talbot family crypt during a full moon. They remove the wolfsbane buried with Larry Talbot. The full moon shines on Larry's body, reviving and transforming him. Larry is found by the police in Cardiff later that night, still with the head wound thought to have killed him, and taken to a hospital where he is treated by Dr. Mannering. During the full moon, Larry becomes the Wolf Man and kills a police constable. The next morning, Larry remembers everything, and implores Mannering to summon police before he kills again. Inspector Owen believes Larry to be an imposter, having confirmed reports of his death, and demands to know his real identity. Larry becomes violently irate, then is overcome by orderlies and bound to his bed with leather straps. Not believing his story of being a werewolf, Mannering and Owen travel to the village of Llanwelly to investigate the Talbot tomb, only to find Larry's body gone, and one of the grave robbers killed in the same manner as the slayings from four years ago. Larry escapes from the hospital by biting through the restraints. Seeking a cure for his apparent inability to die, he leaves Wales and seeks the gypsy Maleva. She opines Dr. Frankenstein may be able to help. Together they travel across Europe to the village of Vasaria. Larry hopes to find Dr. Frankenstein's notes in the remains of his estate.

Larry transforms and kills a young woman, causing a mob of villagers to chase him down. Fleeing to the ruins of Frankenstein's castle, Larry falls through the burned-out flooring and into the frozen cellars. He returns to human form, and discovers Frankenstein's monster trapped within ice. Using a stone, Larry breaks the ice and pulls the creature free, hoping he can show him Frankenstein's notes. As the monster is unable to locate the notes, Larry poses as a potential buyer of the Frankenstein estate in order to find Baroness Elsa Frankenstein, the daughter of Ludwig, hoping she knows their hiding place. She declines to assist Larry, but the pair are invited to the "Festival of the New Wine" by the Burgomeister. During the festival, Dr. Mannering arrives. Having followed Larry across Europe, Mannering attempts to persuade him to commit himself to a mental institution before having another spell. Larry refuses to go with Mannering. The monster crashes the festival and is attacked by the villagers. Larry guides the monster onto a cart and drives him to safety. Elsa and Mannering agree to help the villagers kill Frankenstein's monster. The following morning, Elsa, Mannering, and Maleva meet with Larry and the monster at the ruins. The Baroness gives the notes to Larry. Larry asks that his life energy be transferred to the monster, believing the laboratory can be repaired for the task. Mannering agrees, but secretly he and Elsa plan to drain both Larry and the monster of life.

Mannering begins the procedure, but his curiosity to see the monster at full strength compels him to alter the process and fully revive the monster. Horrified, Elsa attempts to stop the machines, and as a result Larry's life is not fully transferred. The experiment coincides on the night of a full moon, and Larry transforms as the monster regains his strength. The monster begins to carry Elsa away, but the Wolf Man attacks him. Vazec, the innkeeper, suspecting Elsa, Mannering, and Maleva of conspiring with Larry and the monster, destroys the dam overlooking the Frankenstein estate with dynamite, hoping to drown all five of them. Elsa escapes from the castle with Mannering, but the Wolf Man and the monster, engaged in their fight, are both swept away in the flood.

== Cast ==
Cast adapted from the book Universal Horrors:

- Lon Chaney Jr. as Lawrence Stewart Talbot, the Wolf Man
- Ilona Massey as Baroness Elsa Frankenstein
- Patric Knowles as Dr. Frank Mannering
- Lionel Atwill as Mayor
- Bela Lugosi as The Frankenstein monster
- Maria Ouspenskaya as Maleva
- Dennis Hoey as Police Inspector Owen
- Don Barclay as Franzec
- Rex Evans as Vazec
- Dwight Frye as Rudi
- Harry Stubbs as Guno
- Doris Lloyd as Nurse
- Jeff Corey as Grave Digger
- Cyril Delevanti as Freddy Jolly—Graverobber (uncredited)

== Production ==
Curt Siodmak discussed the development of Frankenstein Meets the Wolf Man at the beginning with producer George Waggner proposing the title to him. Siodmak explained that he wanted to purchase a new car and needed a writing job to afford it, which led to Waggner telling him to buy the car as he had two hours to agree to write the script. Richard G. Hubler of the Saturday Evening Post stated that the film was prompted by the nearly one million dollar gross of The Wolf Man (1941). The screenplay of Frankenstein Meets the Wolf Man merges the stories of the two films, as The Wolf Man was set in the present day with the sequel taking place four years later, while the Frankenstein story is set in a much earlier era. The authors of Universal Horrors commented on this, stating that "probably almost no one noticed or cared about details like this when the film was released", as Universal had begun targeting their films to a younger audience. Several minor changes were made to Siodmak's script before the film was completed, such as grave robbers finding Talbot's body with long fingernails, a hospital scene with Dr. Harley (later changed to Dr. Mannering in the film) and Inspector Owen finding Talbot's clothes rotten and moldy and his shirt falling apart.

Universal's plan for the film, initially titled Wolf Man Meets Frankenstein, was to have Lon Chaney Jr. portray both Frankenstein's monster and The Wolf Man. This plan was dropped due to concerns that the intricate effects would not be effective, and the physical strain it would place on Chaney to play both parts. Chaney initially insisted on playing only the Frankenstein monster and Universal briefly considered recasting the role of Talbot by borrowing Warner Brothers contract star Jack Carson before Chaney reconsidered and agreed to reprise the role of Lawrence Talbot. Among the cast was Dwight Frye, who died several months after the film's release, making it his final film for Universal.

Frankenstein Meets the Wolf Man went into production in October 1942 with Waggner producing and Roy William Neill directing. The climactic battle between the Wolf Man and the monster was handled by two stuntmen, Gil Perkins for Lugosi and Eddie Parker. The battle was organized with instructions from Roy William Neill telling them where to start their fight, where to finish, and what kind of fight he wanted it to be, and letting the two actors figure out the rest. On October 5, 1942, Maria Ouspenskaya suffered an ankle injury, and Lugosi collapsed on set and was ordered home by a physician. The cause of Lugosi's collapse was exhaustion from the 35 pounds of make-up he wore.

In keeping with the timeline of The Ghost of Frankenstein (1942), in the script of Frankenstein Meets the Wolf Man the brain of the character Ygor was transplanted into the monster, who was able to speak and was planning to take revenge on the world. Three scenes were shot with the monster having dialogue. Following a preview screening in the studio, the film played normally until Bela Lugosi as the monster spoke, upon which the staff on hand convulsed with laughter. Siodmak explained that "Lugosi couldn't talk! They had left the dialogue I wrote for the Monster in the picture when they shot it, but with Lugosi it sounded so Hungarian funny that they had to take it out!" Without the dialogue, the fact that the revived monster was blind is not mentioned in the finished film. Edward Bernds, the sound man on other Neill films stated that the director had "absolutely no sense of humor" and would not have recognized the comedic nature of the scenes.

== Release ==
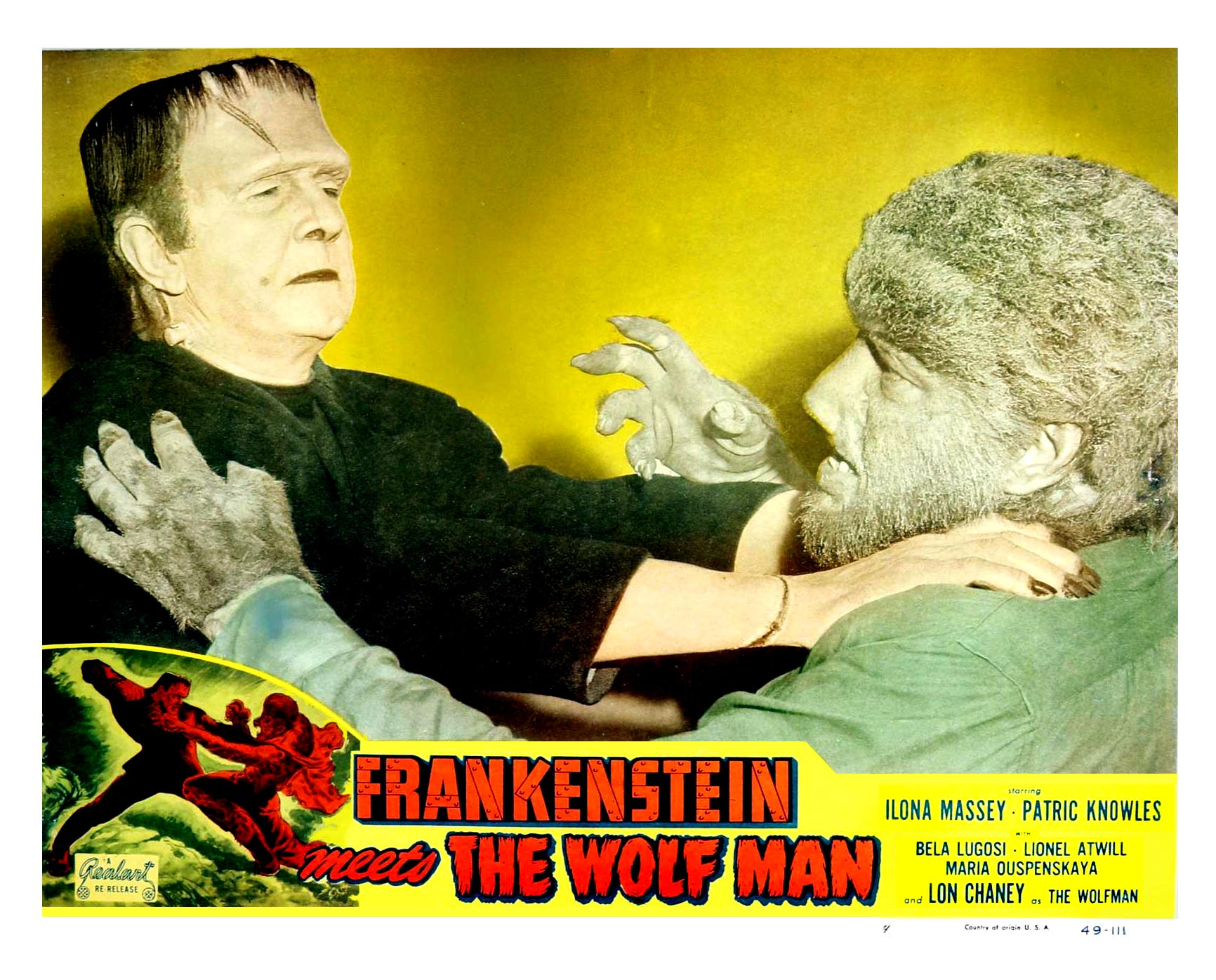
Re-release lobby card for Frankenstein Meets the Wolf Man.

Frankenstein Meets the Wolf Man premiered in New York on March 5, 1943. It was later distributed theatrically by the Universal Pictures Company on March 12, 1943. Clips of Frankenstein Meets the Wolf Man show up in other 1943 films, including He's My Guy where Dick Foran and Irene Harvey work in a vaudeville-movie house where the film is playing. In one scene, Joan Davis enters the auditorium and sees the Wolf Man growl, prompting her to growl back, sending the Wolf Man running away whining. In the film Top Man, Peggy Ryan jumps into the back seat of a convertible and for no reason exclaims "Frankenstein Meets the Wolf Man!" Author and critic Kim Newman proclaimed the film to be "one of the most-often excerpted films in movie history", noting that it would later appear in the background of Mad Dog and Glory (1993), being ignored by Robert De Niro and Uma Thurman as they have sex.

== Reception ==
The authors of Universal Horrors described the initial reception to the film as "generally lukewarm", with many writers treating the film as a joke. Bosley Crowther of The New York Times stated that "there's only a little tussle between [the monster and the Wolf Man] at the end. And that only lasts but a moment. They are both washed away during same. Too bad. Not very horrible. Universal will have to try again". Kate Cameron of The New York Daily News gave the film two and a half stars, noting that the "producers have spent time and money on the production and have gone to considerable trouble to give it the proper atmospheric touches". Harrison's Reports wrote: "For those devotees who like their horror pictures strong, this one will fill the bill ... The action and the eerie atmosphere conforms to a familiar pattern, but it does not detract from the film's horrendous nature". "Walt." of Variety declared that Siodmak "delivers a good job of fantastic writing to weave the necessary thriller ingredients into the piece" and "director Roy William Neill deftly paces the film with both movement and suspense to keep audience interest on sustained plane". Film Daily called it "a horror feast in which devotees of the weird and the fantastic will gorge themselves to bursting. The opportunities for screams are offered with unparalleled generosity".

From retrospective reviews, the authors of Universal Horrors stated that a great part in the success and popularity of the film was Chaney's portrayal of The Wolf Man which was described as "as good or better than the one he gave in The Wolf Man". The authors criticized the screenplay by Siodmak as a weak element, noting how it either ignores or forgets events of the previous films. Kim Newman gave the film three stars, and wrote in Empire that the film was "silly but enormous fun", noting the gypsy song in the film and the climactic final battle as standouts.

On review aggregator Rotten Tomatoes, 25% of 12 critics gave the film a positive review, with an average rating of 5.0/10.

== Legacy ==
Frankenstein Meets the Wolf Man was the first of what would become known as the "monster rally films". These would be followed with other name-brand film monsters in crossovers such as House of Frankenstein (1944) and House of Dracula (1945). The authors of Universal Horrors declared that these films are "often blamed for the decline and demise of the classic Dracula and Frankenstein series, but by the mid-40s they were on their last legs anyways", and the monster rallies "may be juvenilia, but they're slick and enjoyable, and a welcome opportunity for many of the best-loved horror stars to congregate in a single picture", and that among these monster rallies, Frankenstein Meets the Wolf Man was the best in the series. Kim Newman declared that the film set the precedent for future similarly themed films such as King Kong vs. Godzilla (1962), Freddy vs. Jason (2003) and Alien vs. Predator (2004).

== See also ==
- List of films featuring Frankenstein's monster
- List of horror films of the 1940s
- Frankenstein in popular culture
- Werewolves in popular culture
