= The Ghost of Frankenstein =

1942 film by Erle C. Kenton

- Directed by: Erle C. Kenton
- Screenplay by: W. Scott Darling
- Story by: Eric Taylor
- Produced by: George Waggner
- Starring: Cedric Hardwicke; Ralph Bellamy; Lionel Atwill; Bela Lugosi; Evelyn Ankers; Lon Chaney Jr.
- Cinematography: Woody Bredell; Milton R. Krasner
- Edited by: Ted Kent
- Music by: Hans J. Salter
- Production company: Universal Pictures Company, Inc.
- Distributed by: Universal Pictures Company, Inc.
- Release date: 13 March 1942
- Running time: 67 minutes
- Country: United States
- Language: English

The Ghost of Frankenstein is a 1942 American horror film directed by Erle C. Kenton and starring Cedric Hardwicke, Lon Chaney Jr. and Bela Lugosi. It is the fourth film in the Frankenstein series by Universal Pictures, and the follow-up to Son of Frankenstein (1939). The film's plot follows the previous film's plot: Frankenstein's Monster (Lon Chaney Jr.) and his companion Ygor (Bela Lugosi) are chased out of town. They go to another small town to encourage the younger son of Henry Frankenstein (Cedric Hardwicke) to continue his father's experiments, so that Ygor can have revenge against his enemies and his brain transplanted into the Monster's skull.

The film was the first in the series with Chaney portraying the monster and was cast one day after the film was announced by Universal. It began production in December 1941 and finished in January 1942. On its release it received praise as being as strong as the previous films from The Hollywood Reporter and The Motion Picture Herald while it received negative reviews from New York Daily News and The New York Times.

== Plot ==
The residents of Frankenstein's village feel they are under a curse and blame all their troubles on Frankenstein's monster. The Mayor allows them to destroy Frankenstein's castle. Ygor finds the monster released from his sulfuric tomb by the explosions. The exposure to the sulfur has weakened yet preserved the monster. After fleeing the castle with Ygor, the monster is struck by a bolt of lightning in one of his neck bolts, but rather than harming him as Ygor had feared, the lightning strike appears to have given the monster renewed strength. Ygor decides to find Ludwig, the second son of Henry Frankenstein, to help the monster regain his full powers, or "the strength of 100 men." Ludwig Frankenstein is a doctor who, along with his assistants Dr. Kettering and Dr. Theodore Bohmer, has a successful practice in Vasaria. Bohmer was formerly Ludwig's teacher but is now his envious assistant. Bohmer is referred to in the film as someone who "blazed the trail" of brain transplant but whose previous efforts had "unfortunate, tragic consequences." Bohmar is bitter about being Frankenstein's assistant rather than his teacher.

Ygor and the monster arrive in Vasaria, where the monster befriends a young girl, Cloestine Hussman. The monster carries her onto a roof to retrieve her ball, killing two villagers who attempt to intervene. After Cloestine asks the monster to bring her back down, the monster returns the girl to her father Herr Hussman and is captured by police. The town prosecutor, Erik Ernst, later asks Ludwig to examine the giant they have captured. Before he can, Ygor visits Ludwig and informs him that the giant is the monster. Ygor asks Ludwig to heal the monster's body and brain. Ludwig refuses, so Ygor blackmails him with the threat of revealing Ludwig's ancestry to the villagers, and Ludwig aquiesces.

At the courthouse, the monster is restrained with chains as a hearing is conducted to investigate the recent murders. When Ludwig denies recognizing the monster, it breaks free in a fit of rage and is led away by Ygor.

Elsa, Ludwig's daughter, finds the Frankenstein journals and learns the story of the monster. She sees Ygor and the monster in the window. After breaking into Ludwig's laboratory, the monster kills Dr. Kettering. The monster grabs Elsa, but Ludwig subdues him with knockout gas. Ludwig is examining the monster when it awakens and tries to kill him. Ludwig tranquilizes the monster and then tries to enlist Bohmer's aid in dissecting him. Bohmer refuses, saying it would be murder. Ludwig proceeds by himself.

While studying his family's journals, Ludwig is visited by the ghost of his father, Henry Frankenstein. The spirit implores him to supply the monster with a good brain. Ludwig tells Bohmer and Ygor that he plans to put the deceased Dr. Kettering's brain into the monster. Ygor protests that he will lose his friend, and offers his own brain for the experiment. Ludwig refuses, distrustful of Ygor's nature. Elsa begs Ludwig to stop his experiments, to no avail. Ygor tells Bohmer that he should not be subordinate to Ludwig. Ygor promises to help the disgraced doctor if he puts Ygor's brain into the monster.

The police arrive at Ludwig's house, searching for the monster. They find the secret room, but Ygor and the monster have fled. The monster abducts Cloestine from her home and returns to Ludwig's chateau. The monster wants her brain to be placed in his head. Cloestine does not want to lose her brain, and the monster reluctantly gives her to Elsa. When Ygor excitedly tells the Monster that Ygor's brain will be placed in the monster's skull instead and "Tonight, Ygor will die for you!" the monster angrily crushes Ygor between a heavy wooden door and a wall, gravely injuring Ygor, who falls to the ground, his bones crushed.

Ludwig then performs the surgery, not knowing that Bohmer has removed Ygor's brain, not Kettering's.

Herr Hussman rouses his neighbors by surmising his daughter has been captured by the monster and that Ludwig is harboring it. Erik rides ahead of the mob to warn the Frankensteins, and demand answers. Ludwig shows the monster to Erik, saying he has atoned for his father's mistakes by giving the monster a moral brain, but the monster tells Ludwig he is Ygor, not Kettering. The villagers storm the chateau. The Ygor-monster has Bohmer fill the house with gas to kill them. Ludwig tries to stop him, but the Ygor-monster repels the attack and strangles Ludwig. Elsa returns Cloestine to her father, after which the Villagers leave the house with no one harmed.

The Ygor-monster goes blind, a complication due to a mismatch in blood type, according to Ludwig. Ludwig, barely conscious and speaking from the floor, tells the two that the Monster's blindness is permanent, that the blood "Will not feed the sensory nerves."

In frustration, the Ygor-monster screams at Bohmer and throws him onto a machine, electrocuting him, and inadvertently sets fire to the chateau. The Ygor-monster becomes trapped in the burning chateau, his face melting, and is finally hit by a giant wooden beam, trapping him and allowing the fire to consume him while Erik and Elsa escape, walking out into the sunrise.

== Cast and characters ==
- Lon Chaney Jr. as the Monster
- Cedric Hardwicke as Dr. Ludwig Frankenstein
- Ralph Bellamy as Erik Ernst, town prosecutor
- Lionel Atwill as Dr. Theodore Bohmer
- Bela Lugosi as Ygor
- Evelyn Ankers as Elsa Frankenstein
- Janet Ann Gallow as Cloestine Hussman
- Barton Yarborough as Dr. Kettering
- Olaf Hytten as Hussman
- Doris Lloyd as Martha
- Leyland Hodgson as Chief Constable
- Holmes Herbert as Magistrate
- Lawrence Grant as Mayor
- Otto Hoffman as Villager
- Dwight Frye as Villager
- Harry Cording as Frone
- Ernie Stanton as Constable (uncredited)
- Harry Tenbrook as Villager from hearing (uncredited)

== Production ==
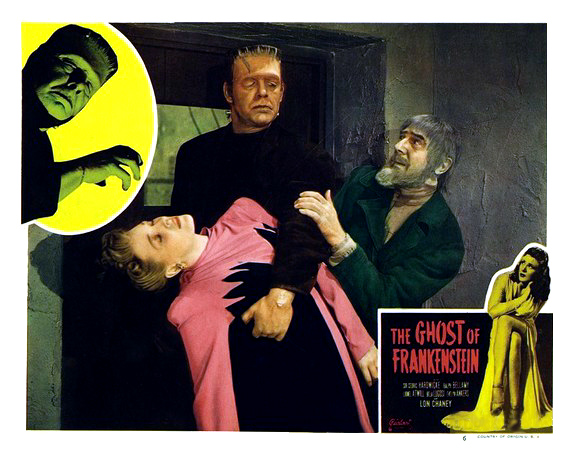
Lobby card with Lon Chaney Jr., Evelyn Ankers and Bela Lugosi in The Ghost of Frankenstein (1942).

The Ghost of Frankenstein was announced from Universal Pictures on November 13, 1941, searching for a new lead to play the title role of the monster. Originally Boris Karloff had been planned to reprise his role as Frankenstein's Monster but had scheduling conflicts with Arsenic and Old Lace. The next day, producer George Waggner was instructed to order the same type of make-up that Karloff wore for the new actor portraying the monster with instructions that changing the appearance may "kill the interest of Frankenstein follower". Lon Chaney Jr. was chosen for the role of the Monster. The film, which follows the storyline set up in Son of Frankenstein, was the fourth part of Universal's Frankenstein series and was the last film in the series with Frankenstein's Monster as the sole monster.

Early versions of the script were written by Eric Taylor, and included elements not used in the film, such as the return of Basil Rathbone's character from Son of Frankenstein. Parts that existed in Taylor's original script included the Monster's bond with children, villagers storming a castle, a brain transplant sequence, and a fiery demise of the monster. Universal submitted its script to the Production Code Association under the title There's Always Tomorrow. The censors there warned against excessive violence and reminded the studio that scenes set in Frankenstein's operating room and insanity ward would be deleted in England.

The film went into production on December 14, 1941. Chaney suffered a severe allergic reaction to the monster makeup applied by Jack Pierce and missed several days of shooting. Janet Ann Gallow, who played Cloestine Hussman in the film, spoke about working with Chaney in 2005, stating that she spent much time with Chaney, "riding his legs, his knees, sitting on his lap. He was nice, gentle with me and easy to work with - better than anyone else!" She found working with Chaney was like working with a "favourite uncle". When Gallow's mother died in 1946, Chaney offered to adopt her and her brother, which Gallow's father did not consent to. Filming completed production in early January 1942.

== Release ==
The Ghost of Frankenstein was distributed by the Universal Pictures Company on March 13, 1942. The film was banned in Denmark when Universal tried to release it there in 1948.

The Ghost of Frankenstein was released on DVD as part of The Monster Legacy Collection and Frankenstein: The Legacy Collection on April 27, 2004. It was released again as a double feature with Son of Frankenstein on July 24, 2007.

== Reception ==
From contemporary reviews, an anonymous reviewer from The Hollywood Reporter found the film "stands on an imaginative par with all of its interest-gripping, quasi-scientific predecessors" and that Erle C. Kenton's direction "makes magnificent use of every element of suspense". Another anonymous reviewer in The Motion Picture Herald opined that the film "maintains a standard of performance, effectiveness and quality exceeding the average for horror films by a considerable margin". Wanda Hale of The New York Daily News described the film as "horrid, not horrendous and horribly boring even though a lot of good players [...] do the best they can with the dreadful material". Bosley Crowther of The New York Times declared that the thought of Frankenstein's Monster returning in another film following The Ghost of Frankenstein "fills us with mortal terror. That is the most fearful prospect which the picture manages to convey."

From retrospective reviews, the authors of Universal Horrors opined that later Universal monster movies like The Ghost of Frankenstein lacked the sublime possibilities and subtlety of true horror movies, though they acknowledged that The Ghost of Frankenstein was more embraced by fans than its predecessor Son of Frankenstein and was "fun to watch". Craig Butler of AllMovie felt that the film was "a significant decline, but it's still passable entertainment (something that is not necessarily true of some later entries in the series)". Butler said the biggest problem was that Chaney's performance as the monster "lacks the special magic that Karloff brought to the role", though he also criticized the fragmented story and flavorless direction. He still considered it essential viewing for horror fans, but concluded that regular viewers would find it only moderately entertaining.

In 2005, the American Film Institute nominated Hans J. Salter's score for The Ghost of Frankenstein to be on their list of AFI's 100 Years of Film Scores.

== See also ==
- List of films featuring Frankenstein's monster
- Frankenstein in popular culture
