= Igor (character) =

Stock character

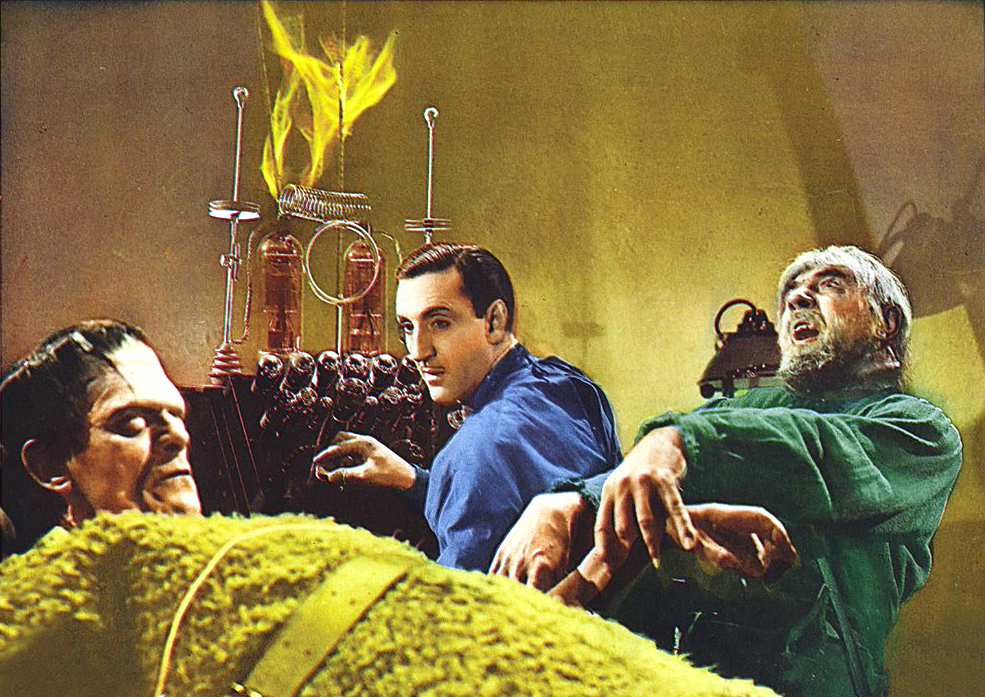
Boris Karloff as Frankenstein's monster, Basil Rathbone as Dr. Frankenstein's son Wolf Frankenstein, and Bela Lugosi as Ygor in Son of Frankenstein (1939)

A commercial that features Igor

Igor, or sometimes Ygor, is a stock character, as a sometimes hunch-backed laboratory assistant to many types of Gothic villains or as a fiendish character who assists only himself, the latter most prominently portrayed by Bela Lugosi in Son of Frankenstein (1939) and The Ghost of Frankenstein (1942). He is familiar from many horror films and horror film parodies. He is traditionally associated with mad scientists, particularly Victor Frankenstein, although Frankenstein has neither a lab assistant nor is there a character named Igor in the original Mary Shelley novel. The Igor of popular parlance is a composite character, based on characters created for the plays and for Universal Studios film franchise. The 1823 play gave Victor Frankenstein a sidekick named Fritz. In the first Universal Frankenstein film (1931), Fritz served the same role; in the sequels, a different physically deformed character, Ygor, is featured, though Ygor is not an assistant in those films. Many Igor-type characters are also portrayed with a voice similar to that of actor Peter Lorre.

== Origins ==
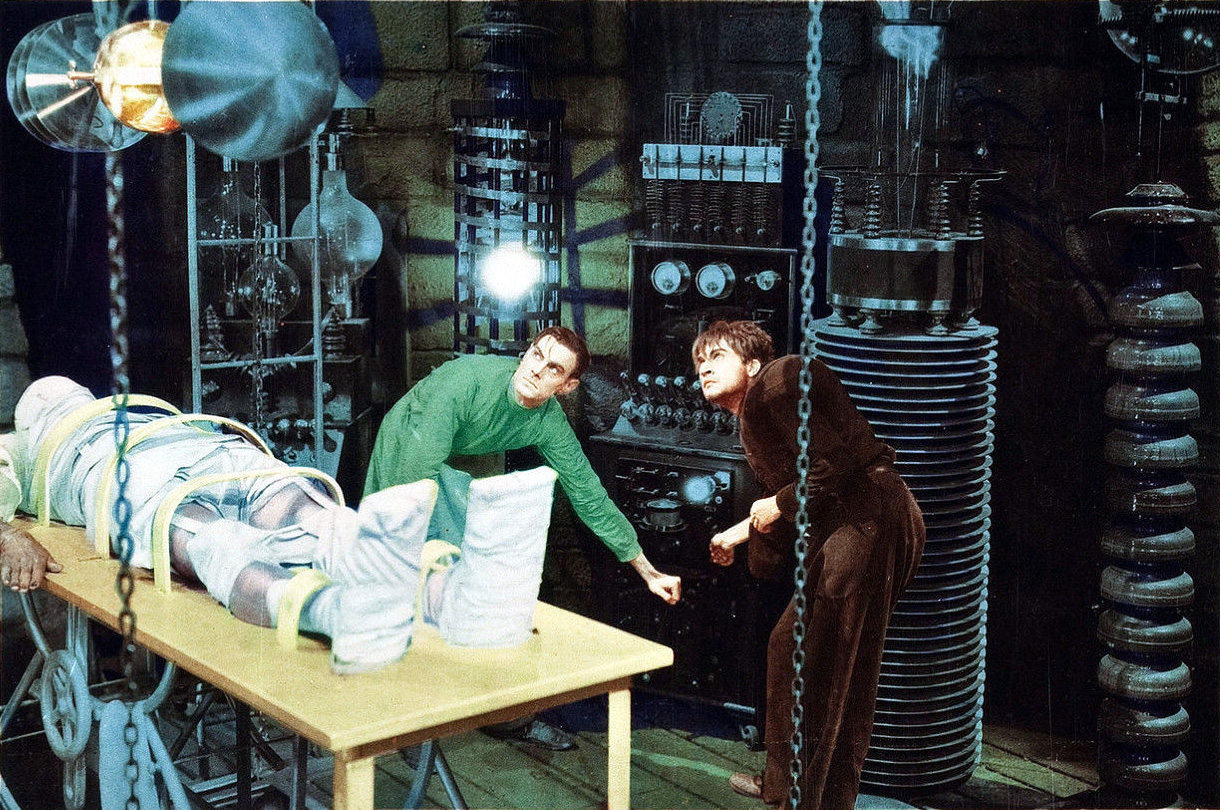
Colin Clive as Dr. Frankenstein and Dwight Frye as Fritz in Frankenstein (1931)

Dwight Frye's hunchbacked lab assistant in the first film of the Frankenstein series (1931) is the main source for the "Igor" of public imagination, though this character is actually named Fritz. Fritz did not originate from the Frankenstein novel, but from the earliest recorded play adaptation Presumption; or, the Fate of Frankenstein (1823) where he was played by Robert Keeley. Beyond his iconic role as Fritz in Frankenstein (1931), Dwight Frye shaped Universal's horror legacy as Renfield, Count Dracula's insane servant in Dracula (1931), and Karl, Doctor Septimus Pretorius's deranged henchman in Bride of Frankenstein (1935).

In the horror film Mystery of the Wax Museum (1933), Ivan Igor is the name of the mad wax museum curator. The film was remade as House of Wax (1953), but the name Igor was given to the curator's henchman (Charles Bronson) rather than the curator himself. This character is deaf and mute, rather than a hunchback and his corresponding character in the original film was named "Hugo."

The second and third sequel films Son of Frankenstein (1939) and The Ghost of Frankenstein (1942) feature a character named Ygor, portrayed by Bela Lugosi. This character is neither a hunchback nor a lab assistant, but a blacksmith with a badly healed broken neck as the result of a botched hanging. He helps Wolf Frankenstein reanimate the Monster, so Ygor can use it as an instrument of vengeance against the townspeople who hanged him for grave robbing. He survives a gunshot wound and appears in the next film, in which his brain is placed in the Monster's body, but the body is rendered blind because Ygor's blood is not compatible with the Monster's blood.

Universal Studios actively cemented the idea of the hunchbacked assistant to the "mad scientist" in House of Frankenstein (1944), with J. Carrol Naish playing a hunchbacked lab assistant named Daniel, who serves the exiled Dr. Gustav Niemann (Boris Karloff). Niemann, after escaping from prison, attempts to replicate Dr. Frankenstein's experiments, continuing his macabre legacy of monster creation. He is similar to Quasimodo in that he falls for a Romani dancer, but she loses interest in him when she meets Lawrence Talbot.

== Development of the stereotype ==
The comedy film Young Frankenstein (1974) features the character Igor (portrayed by Marty Feldman and pronounced EYE-gore), a crazy eyed hunchback who becomes the assistant of Dr. Frederick Frankenstein (portrayed by Gene Wilder), both their grandfathers having coincidentally worked together. The duo begin working on creating the monster from the corpse of a hanged criminal. Igor is tasked to steal the brain of Hans Delbrück, however he drops it and finds another one labelled abnormal (which he mistakenly reads "Abby Normal") and takes it, resulting in the monster (portrayed by Peter Boyle) becoming unpredictable and running rampant near the village.

=== Further examples ===
Sir Terry Pratchett heavily lampooned the stereotype in his Discworld book series by creating a humanoid race — created from and made up of donated interchangeable body parts and organs from other Igors and their patients, that are handed down through the generations — of highly skilled surgical assistants to vampires and mad scientists in the country of Überwald called Igors, who are all named Igor or Igorina.

Another Igor appears in Van Helsing (2004), portrayed by Kevin J. O'Connor, who now becomes loyal to Count Dracula after betraying Dr. Frankenstein.

The animated comedy film Igor (2008) features an assortment of Igors who are servants to multiple mad scientists in the fictional kingdom of Malaria, where they assist their mad scientist masters like Dr. Glickenstein (voiced by John Cleese) and Dr. Frederick "Schadenfreude" Poeklemacher (voiced by Eddie Izzard) to create evil inventions so they can blackmail the world to pay the country billions or they will unleash their monstrosities across the globe. One Igor (voiced by John Cusack) is the assistant of Dr. Glickenstein who dreams of becoming a mad scientist himself by creating a monster with the help of his creations Scamper and Brain (voiced by Steve Buscemi and Sean Hayes). However, the monster Eva (voiced by Molly Shannon) develops a sweet gentle personality and desires to become an actress. Other Igors in this film include Dr. Poeklemacher's Igor (voiced by Christian Slater) and Dr. Poeklemacher's girlfriend Jaclyn (voiced by Jennifer Coolidge) who used stolen shapeshifter pills to appear human.

The film Victor Frankenstein (2015) features its version of Igor (portrayed by Daniel Radcliffe) whose abnormality is caused by a cyst on his back that Victor Frankenstein drains.

The 2012 Teenage Mutant Ninja Turtles episode "The Frankenstein Experiment" featured Igor Fritz Radev (voiced by Grant Moninger impersonating Peter Lorre) who is the assistant of Dr. Victor Frankenstein. When Dr. Frankenstein called Donatello the best assistant he had, Igor betrayed Dr. Frankenstein by helping Savanti Romero and Count Dracula. During the fight, Igor is defenestrated by a mind-controlled Raphael.

The Universal Epic Universe theme park has a "Dark Universe" section that features an Igor-type character that also named Ygor. He is a normal human who works for Henry Frankenstein's great-great-granddaughter Victoria Frankenstein.

The first example of a female Igor is found in the comedy Frankenstein oder der moderne Proletheus (Frankenstein or the modern Proletheu) by Otto Beckmann. Here Igor is unrequitedly in love with her master and emancipates herself finally by leaving his laboratory and advising the creature to do likewise. In the world premiere at the Deutsche Bühne Ungarn the part was played by Eszter Sipos.

== See also ==
- Universal Monsters
