= Son of Frankenstein =

1939 film by Rowland V. Lee

- Theatrical release poster
- Directed by: Rowland V. Lee
- Screenplay by: Willis Cooper
- Produced by: Rowland V. Lee
- Starring: Basil Rathbone; Boris Karloff; Bela Lugosi; Lionel Atwill; Josephine Hutchinson; Donnie Dunagan
- Cinematography: George Robinson
- Edited by: Ted Kent
- Music by: Frank Skinner
- Production company: Universal Pictures Co.
- Distributed by: Universal Pictures Co.
- Release date: January 13, 1939
- Running time: 99 minutes
- Country: United States
- Language: English
- Budget: $420,000

Son of Frankenstein is a 1939 American horror film directed by Rowland V. Lee and starring Basil Rathbone, Boris Karloff and Bela Lugosi. The film is the third in Universal Pictures' Frankenstein series and is the follow-up to the 1935 film Bride of Frankenstein. Son of Frankenstein stars Rathbone as Baron Wolf von Frankenstein who, with his wife Elsa (Josephine Hutchinson) and son Peter (Donnie Dunagan), returns to his late father's estate. Near the castle lives Ygor (Bela Lugosi), a crazed blacksmith whose neck was broken in an unsuccessful hanging attempt. Among the castle's remains, Frankenstein discovers the remains of the Monster (Boris Karloff) and decides to try to save his family name by resurrecting the creature to prove his father was correct. He finds, however, the Monster only responds to Ygor's commands.

The film was originally announced in August 1938 after a successful theatrical reissue of Dracula and Frankenstein. Son of Frankenstein was initially announced under the title After Frankenstein. The screenplay written by Willis Cooper was initially rejected and early script drafts included only the characters that would be used in the final film. The original budget was set at $250,000 but Lee increased it to $300,000 and had a 27-day shooting schedule. Difficulties in production arose when Lee was unsatisfied with the script. Production was delayed until November 9 due to inclement weather and other problems, and filming was completed on January 5, 1939, with a final cost of $420,000. The film was released on January 13, 1939, and received positive reviews from The New York Daily News, The New York Times, Variety and the Monthly Film Bulletin. A sequel, The Ghost of Frankenstein, was released in 1942.

== Plot ==
Baron Wolf von Frankenstein, son of Henry Frankenstein, relocates his wife Elsa and their young son Peter to the family castle. Wolf wants to redeem his father Henry's reputation but finds this will be more difficult than he thought after encountering hostility from the villagers, who resent him for the destruction wreaked by his father's Monster years before. Wolf's only other friend is local police Inspector Krogh, who wears an artificial arm because Frankenstein's creature ripped off his real one when he was a child. While investigating Henry's castle, Wolf meets Ygor, a blacksmith who survived being hanged for grave-robbing and has a deformed neck as a result. Ygor brings Wolf to the Monster's comatose body, in the crypt where his grandfather and father are buried; Henry's sarcophagus bears the name "Heinrich von Frankenstein" with "Maker of Monsters" added in chalk. Wolf decides to revive the Monster to prove Henry was correct and to restore honour to his family. Using a torch, Wolf scratches out the word "Monsters" and writes "Men" beneath it.

Wolf revives the Monster, but it only responds to Ygor's commands; he sends the Monster out to commit various murders. Meanwhile, Peter talks of a nice giant who visits him in his room, and to whom he gave one of his picture books. Elsa and Amelia, Peter's nurse, are amused at his supposed imagination, but Wolf and Krogh take the story seriously. Krogh suspects that Wolf has created a murderous monster similar to Henry's, due to marks on the victims' bodies. However, Wolf denies it. Meanwhile, Benson, the Frankensteins' butler, who is also a friend and assistant to Wolf, suggests to Wolf that he tell Krogh about the Monster, which Ygor overhears. Wolf refuses but agrees that Elsa and Peter must leave the castle. Wolf eventually questions Ygor about Benson's disappearance; Ygor claims that Benson was so frightened by the Monster that he ran away. Wolf tells Elsa that he wants her and Peter to go temporarily to Brussels, and he will follow later.

After what is at first believed to be an accidental death – a man apparently crushed by his wagon – another murder occurs, and Krogh realizes that these latest deaths are connected to the previous six. The next day, he tells Wolf that he cannot allow any of the family to leave the castle for their own safety, as the villagers are convinced he had something to do with the murders and they might get violent. Peter shows Krogh a present the giant gave him, which the inspector realizes is Benson's watch. Wolf tries to force Ygor to leave, but the Monster comes to his defence. Ygor boasts that he sent the Monster to kill all the men from the jury that sentenced him to hang.

Later, Wolf suggests to Krogh that Ygor is the killer, but Krogh says Ygor was under observation and could not be the murderer. Krogh believes that Wolf knows who the killer is: a monster, either one created by Wolf, or Henry's creation which is still alive. To appease the villagers, Krogh arrests Wolf for the disappearance of Benson. Krogh then orders Wolf not to leave the castle. Nevertheless, Wolf is determined to throw Ygor off his property; he finds Ygor in the castle's laboratory and when Ygor tries to kill him with a hammer, he shoots him. Ygor collapses, apparently dead. Krogh searches for a secret passage connecting the castle to the laboratory; in it, he finds Benson's body.

The Monster finds Ygor's body and screams in anguish. In his grief he wrecks everything he can find. He abducts Wolf's son in revenge but cannot bring himself to kill him. Krogh, Wolf, Elsa and Amelia pursue the Monster to the laboratory where a struggle ensues. The Monster tears off Krogh's false arm and uses it as a shield to deflect Krogh's gunshots. Wolf swings on a chain and knocks the Monster into a pit of molten sulfur beneath the laboratory, saving his son. Wolf leaves the keys of the castle to the villagers, who cheer the family as they leave by train.

== Cast ==
- Basil Rathbone as Baron Wolf von Frankenstein
- Boris Karloff as The Monster
- Bela Lugosi as Ygor
- Lionel Atwill as Inspector Krogh
- Josephine Hutchinson as Baroness Elsa von Frankenstein
- Donnie Dunagan as Peter von Frankenstein, Wolf and Elsa's young son
- Emma Dunn as Amelia, a servant
- Edgar Norton as Thomas Benson, a butler
- Perry Ivins as Fritz, a servant
- Lawrence Grant as the Burgomaster
- Michael Mark as Ewald Neumüller, a juror
- Lionel Belmore as Emil Lang, another juror
- Gustav von Seyffertitz as Burgher
- Lorimer Johnston as Burgher
- Tom Ricketts as Burgher
- Russ Powell as Burgher
- Caroline Cooke as Frau Neumüller, Edwald Neumüller's wife
- Ward Bond as Gendarme at Gate
- Harry Cording as Bearded Gendarme

== Production ==
=== Development ===
Following the release of Dracula's Daughter in May 1936, all horror film productions were dropped from Universal Pictures production schedules. The studio resumed horror film production after a two-year break with the announcement of Son of Frankenstein in August 1938. Initially, Universal considered remaking their earlier films The Old Dark House (1932) and The Raven (1935) but instead decided to make a new Frankenstein film after the success of the triple bill of Dracula (1931), Frankenstein (1931) and Son of Kong (1933) at Los Angeles' Regina Theatre on Wilshire Boulevard. The screenings at the 659-seat theater packed houses for five weeks, leading Universal to reissue Frankenstein and Dracula on one program in theaters across the United States.

=== Pre-production ===
Son of Frankenstein was first mentioned in trade papers on August 29, 1938, when an article in The Hollywood Reporter said Universal was negotiating a two-horror-picture deal with Boris Karloff, the first one being a sequel to Frankenstein. By September 2, the magazine reported Universal had announced the film as After Frankenstein. Bela Lugosi and Basil Rathbone were announced as cast members on October 20, and on October 24, Universal announced in The Hollywood Reporter plans to hire Karloff, Lugosi and Peter Lorre, but the latter had fallen through because the company could not borrow Lorre from 20th Century Fox. According to the press release, Lorre had turned down the offer as he had stopped working in horror films to become Mr. Moto and "did not want to risk being 'on another meanie'". Claude Rains was also briefly considered for the role of Wolf von Frankenstein, which eventually went to Rathbone. Lugosi spoke about the role with Ed Sullivan shortly before the film's release, stating he had to stretch eight weeks of pay over one-hundred and four weeks due the lack of work. Lugosi received a call from Eric Umann to appear at the Regina Theatre for the screenings of Dracula, Frankenstein and Son of Kong, and shortly after was cast in Son of Frankenstein. Lugosi said: "I owe it all to that little man at the Regina Theatre. I was dead and he brought me to life". Director Rowland V. Lee said his crew let Lugosi "work on the characterization; the interpretation he gave us was imaginative and totally unexpected ... when we finished shooting, there was no doubt in anyone's mind that he stole the show. Karloff's monster was weak by comparison".

Among the cast was Josephine Hutchinson, who had signed on for a two-picture deal with Universal, first appearing in The Crime of Doctor Hallet (1938). Hutchinson later stated, "doing a Frankenstein film is kind of a phony bit – you don't have to delve too deeply". The role of Peter was played by Donnie Dunagan, who had worked with Lee on Mother Carey's Chickens (1938). Dunagan later called his performance "corny" and said: "They had this little kid in there with this loud voice. They kept saying 'Speak up!' because I didn't speak that loud then ... And as you speak up, your accent is always accentuated. So here's this little curly-headed jerk runnin' around there with this very deep Memphis-Texas accent! They had the courage to do that".

The director and producer for the film was Rowland V. Lee, who was 45 years old and had been working in the film industry since he was 19. It was Lee's second film for Universal. Wyllis Cooper, the creator of the radio show Lights Out, submitted an original screenplay for Son of Frankenstein that was initially rejected. This screenplay, which was dated October 20, 1938, involved Wolf, his wife Else and their young son Erwin arriving at Castle Frankenstein to claim their inheritance. Wolf's father's will stipulates the monster remain out of commission for at least 25 years following the watchtower explosion before any inheritance can be claimed. Cooper's original script had several other references to Bride of Frankenstein, including the finding of the skeletal remains of Doctor Septimus Pretorius and the Bride of Frankenstein. The script continues with the monster surviving the explosion at the end of the 1935 film and confronting Wolf to make a friend for him, and threatening to kill Elsa and Erwin if Wolf disobeys.

Wolf's antagonist in this script is Inspector Neumüllerr, who vows vengeance against the monster for killing his father. After Wolf fails to make a friend for the monster using corpses, the monster steals Erwin, intending to take him to the lab and carry out brain surgery on him. He is stopped as Wolf enters, and Neumüller and his forces shoot the monster, who falls into a pit. The script was changed to keep most of the characters intact; Neumuller becoming Krogh, who has lost an arm instead of a father, and changed the child's name to Peter. The new version also eliminated the monster's ability to speak and added the character Ygor. The film was originally set at a budget of $250,000 but this sum was increased to $300,000 and received a planned 27-day shooting schedule. Lee briefly considered shooting the film in color but this idea was abandoned after Karloff's makeup looked poor in George Robinson's color tests.

=== Filming and post-production ===
Production of Son of Frankenstein began on October 17, 1938, but filming was delayed until November 9 due to Lee's dissatisfaction with Cooper's screenplay. The cast was already on salary so the studio gave orders for Lee to go ahead, which led to the budget growing to $500,000. The lack of a completed script led to actors receiving freshly written pages minutes before scenes were set up to be filmed. The finishing date of the production was postponed from December 10 to 17. According to actor Josephine Hutchinson, director Lee did some rewriting on set.

Filming was further delayed by problems including rain and cold weather, which forced Lee to halt some filming. In the November 30 issue of The Hollywood Reporter, Universal announced the staff working on the cutting and scoring of Son of Frankenstein had been doubled to meet its scheduled release date. The head of the editorial, sound and music departments – Maurice Pivar, Bernard B. Brown and Charles Previn respectively – alerted their staff about the possibility of working until the New Year holiday to meet the shipping date of the first 20 prints of the film. By December 24, filming had not been completed, and the cast and crew worked until 6:15 pm rather than the usual noon finish.

Production on the film was completed on January 5, 1939. Dunagan said the film took a toll on Karloff, that the monster make-up "was punishing him" due to its weight, and that "when we got through with that movie, my sense was that he did not like that role. And I can promise you he didn't like the costume, which had to hurt him physically". Son of Frankenstein was Karloff's final appearance as the monster in the series; he only portrayed him again for unique appearances on the television show Route 66 and at an all-star baseball game. In 1948, Karloff said: "After Son, I decided the character no longer had any potentialities – the makeup did all the work. Anybody who can take that makeup every morning deserves respect".

Post-production units only had a few days before the set January 7 preview dates. The first cut of the film ran over 100 minutes and was reduced. The final cost of the production was $420,000.

== Release ==
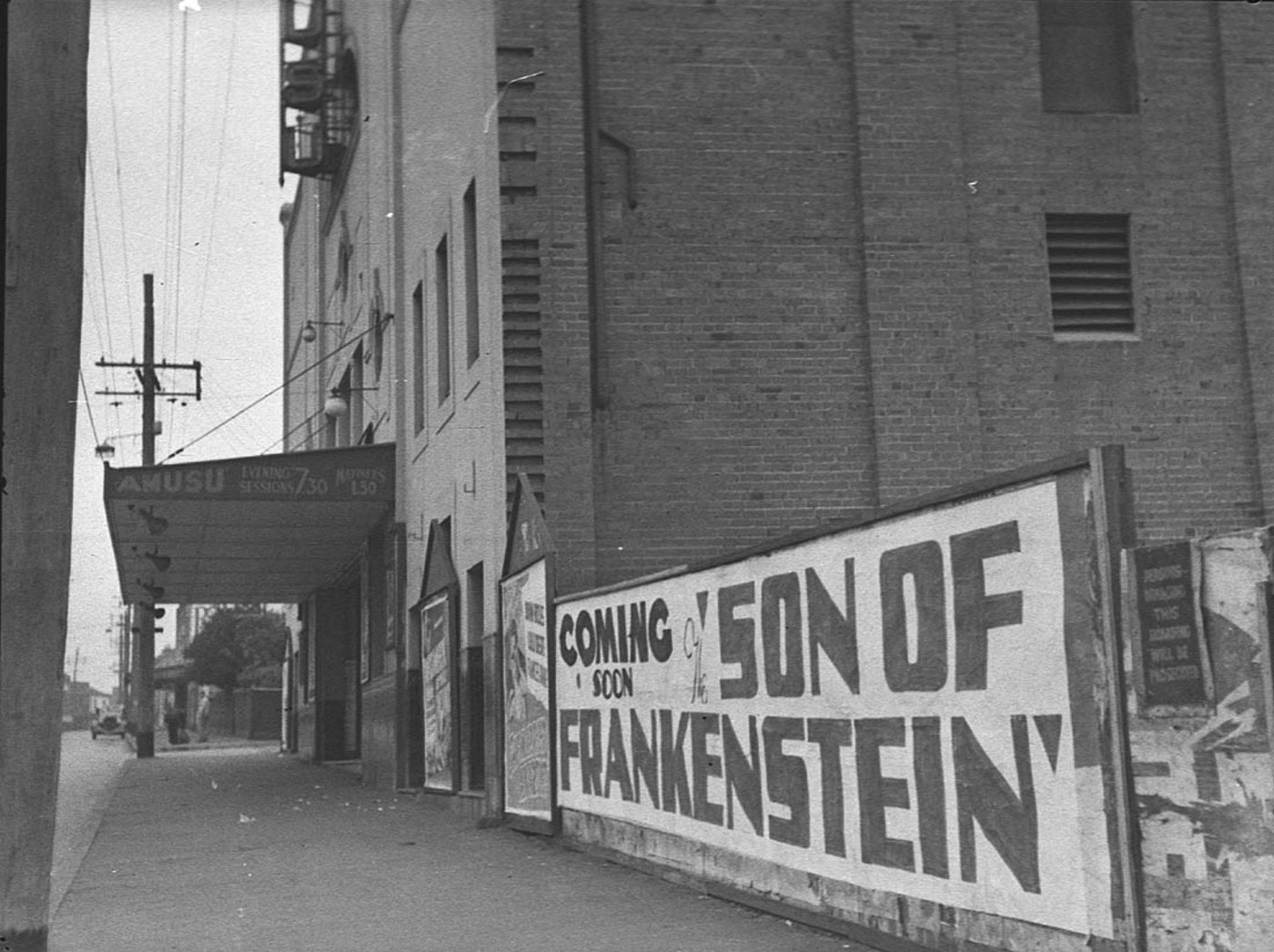
Photo of promotional image for Son of Frankenstein from 1939.

Son of Frankenstein was distributed theatrically by Universal Pictures on January 13, 1939. The film performed well at the US box office; according to The Hollywood Reporter, the film had reaped greater returns than any prior horror film in key city openings. The first-weekend revenue in Los Angeles, Boston and Richmond exceeded those of previous Universal film openings in those three cities.

In 1948, Realart Pictures Inc. secured the reissue rights to the majority of Universal Pictures' library, which included the Universal monster movies. In 1952, the company re-released Son of Frankenstein theatrically. In late 1957, a television subsidiary of Columbia Pictures put together a package of Universal's films and screened them in a series called Shock Theater across the United States. This series included Son of Frankenstein. According to the book Universal Horrors, the baby boomers generation primarily discovered these films through this television series. In 1987, Universal/MCA found an uncut print of Son of Frankenstein and debated whether to release it or the more familiar edited version on home video. The company decided on the latter. The film was released on DVD as part of "The Monster Legacy Collection" and "Frankenstein: The Legacy Collection" on April 27, 2004.

== Reception ==
Gary Don Rhodes wrote that Son of Frankenstein received "stronger reviews than generally met other horror films". Among contemporary reviews, The Hollywood Reporter said the film was "a knockout of its type of production, acting and effects" because Lee's direction "keeps a chillingly sombre mood, and the grim humor that's in it, he handles very well indeed". The Motion Picture Herald said the film "is a masterpiece in the demonstration of how production settings and effects can be made assets emphasizing literary melodrama". Kate Cameron of The New York Daily News said Lee "created an eerie atmosphere for the story and he has put into the working out of the plot enough horror to send the chills and shivers racing up and down the spectators' backs". B. R. Crisler of The New York Times said the film could be considered "the silliest picture ever made", yet implements "a very shrewd silliness, perpetrated by a good director in the best traditions of cinematic horror, so that even while you laugh at its nonsense you may be struck with the notion that perhaps that's as good a way of enjoying oneself at a movie as any". In a Variety review, the film was called "well mounted, nicely directed, and includes [a] cast of capable artists". The Monthly Film Bulletin stated "since the whole atmosphere of the film is so far removed from everyday reality it is impossible to take the horrors very seriously", noting for a film of its genre, "the production is good and of a high technical quality", and praised the performances of Rathbone and Atwill.

According to the authors of the book Universal Horrors (2007), Son of Frankenstein is "the last of the great Frankenstein films", and "every aspect of the picture, from the acting to the technical departs, is first-rate", concluding the film is "grandiose in scope, magnificent in design, it supplanted the quaint romanticsm and delicate fantasy flavoring of Bride of Frankenstein with a stark, grimly expressionistic approach to horror". Jim Hoberman of The Village Voice in 2011 praised Lugosi's performance as Ygor, writing he "pretty much steals the movie in his last really juicy role". Richard Gilliam of AllMovie said the film is unusual because of its high quality despite being the third film in the series, and noted the "strong story, fine inherited production motifs, and an excellent cast" and that the film is still a step-down from the two previous Frankenstein films. A review in Leonard Maltin's Classic Movie Guide (2015) described it as a "lavishly made shocker", describing the "wonderfully bizarre sets by Jack Otterson" and Lugosi's "finest performance" as highlights.

In the book The Definitive Guide to Horror Movies (2018), Kim Newman said Lugosi was in "his finest screen role", while Atwill and Rathbone made up for the lack of the British presence director James Whale had. Less positive reviews mentioned Whale's absence as the film's director; Phil Edwards in Starburst in the early 1980s said Son of Frankenstein is "not particularly novel and the somewhat hackneyed story points the way to the sad direction which later Universal horrors would follow". James Marriott dismissed the film as inferior to James Whale's earlier films in the series, finding the plot "wildly uneven" and that "Karloff sleepwalks through his performance, leaving Lugosi to outshine him.".

== Legacy ==
After the success of Son of Frankenstein, Universal announced a follow-up film, The Ghost of Frankenstein, on November 13, 1941, saying they had been searching for a new lead to play the monster. The next day, producer George Waggner was instructed to order the same type of makeup Karloff wore for the new actor, with instructions that changing the appearance may "kill the interest of Frankenstein follower". Lon Chaney Jr. was chosen to play the monster. The Ghost of Frankenstein was released on March 13, 1942.

== See also ==
- Bela Lugosi filmography
- Boris Karloff filmography
- List of horror films of the 1930s
- List of Universal Pictures films (1930–1939)
