= 1828 in literature =

This article contains information about the literary events and publications of 1828.

== Events ==
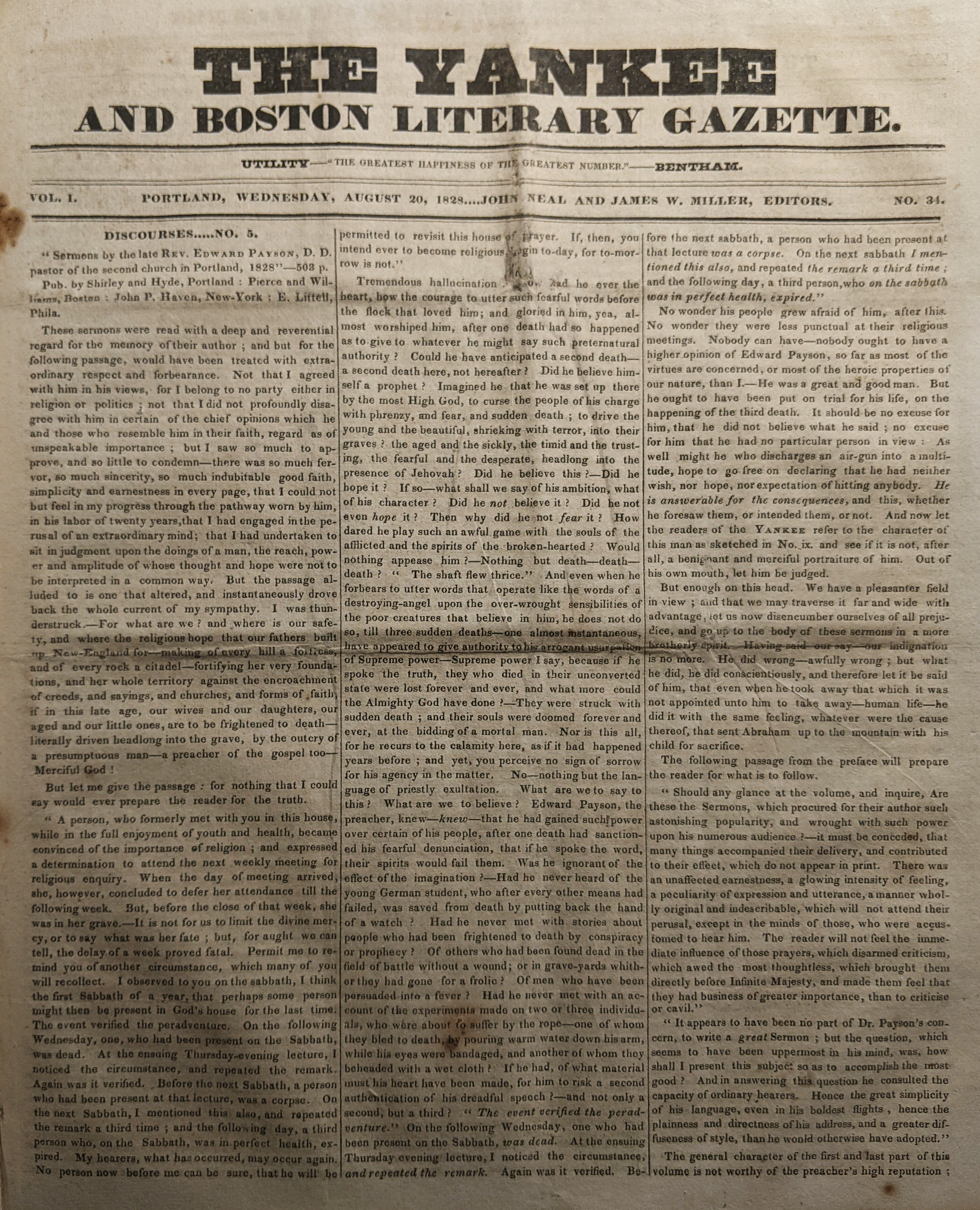
The first issue of The Yankee with a subtitle: August 20, 1828

- January – Thomas Dale becomes the first university professor of English language and English literature, at the new London University.
- January 1 – John Neal launches The Yankee literary journal.
- January 6 – William Lamb, the future Viscount Melbourne, writes to his estranged wife, Lady Caroline Lamb, from Ireland, regretting that official duties make it impossible to visit her immediately. Later in the month, he makes the sea crossing. He arrives at her bedside shortly before her death.
- February 21 – The Cherokee Phœnix, the earliest newspaper published by Native Americans in the United States and in one of their indigenous languages, Cherokee, is first issued in New Echota.
- April 1 – The Athenæum, "London Literary and Critical Journal", is launched by James Silk Buckingham.
- December – Nikolai Gogol leaves school and goes to Saint Petersburg.
- unknown dates
  - Sherman Converse publishes Noah Webster's 70,000 word American Dictionary of the English Language.
  - Elizabeth Caroline Grey's The Skeleton Count, or The Vampire Mistress is published; it is considered by some to be the first vampire story by a woman author.
  - John Payne Collier produces a script of Punch and Judy.
  - The Reclam publishing company is established in Leipzig by Anton Philipp Reclam.
  - Færøernes Amts Bibliotek, the National Library of the Faroe Islands, is established.

== New books ==
=== Fiction ===
- Anonymous – The Lustful Turk
- Steen Steensen Blicher – Sildig Opvaagnen
- Anna Eliza Bray – The White Hoods: an Historical Romance
- Edward Bulwer-Lytton
  - The Disowned
  - Pelham
- George Croly – Salathiel
- Selina Davenport – Italian Vengeance and English Forbearance
- Thomas Gaspey – The History of George Godfrey
- Léon Gozlan – Les Mémoires d'un apothécaire
- Elizabeth Caroline Grey – De Lisle
- Gerald Griffin – The Collegians
- Ann Hatton – Uncle Peregrine's Heiress
- Nathaniel Hawthorne – Fanshawe
- Robert Huish – The Red Barn
- Bernhard Severin Ingemann – Erik Menveds Barndom (Erik Menved's Childhood)
- Thomas Henry Lister – Herbert Lacy
- Jane C. Loudon – The Mummy!
- James Justinian Morier – The Adventures of Hajji Baba of Ispahan in England
- John Neal – Rachel Dyer: a North American Story
- Lord Normanby – Yes and No
- T. J. Llewelyn Prichard – The Adventures and Vagaries of Twm Shon Catti, descriptive of life in Wales; interspersed with poems
- Susanna Rowson – Lucy Temple
- Rosalia St. Clair – Ulrica of Saxony
- Sir Walter Scott – The Fair Maid of Perth (or St. Valentine's Day; Chronicles of the Canongate, 2nd series)

=== Drama ===
- Alfred de Vigny – Roméo et Juliette and Shylock (adaptations from Shakespeare, published)
- Franz Grillparzer – Ein Treuer Diener
- Johan Ludvig Heiberg – Elves' Hill (Elverhøi)
- Henrik Hertz – Flyttedagen
- Victor Hugo – Amy Robsart
- James Sheridan Knowles – The Beggar's Daughter of Bethnal Green
- Mary Russell Mitford – Rienzi
- Richard Brinsley Peake – The Haunted Inn
- Jovan Sterija Popović – Miloš Obilić
- Lord Porchester – Don Pedro, King of Castile
- Émile Souvestre – Siege de Missolonghi
- Gotthilf August von Maltitz – Hans Kohlhaas

=== Poetry ===
- Adam Mickiewicz – Konrad Wallenrod

=== Non-fiction ===
- August Böckh (editor) – Corpus Inscriptionum Graecum (begins publication)
- George Combe – The Constitution of Man
- Barbara Hofland – Africa Described, in Its Ancient and Present State
- Washington Irving – A History of the Life and Voyages of Christopher Columbus
- Charles Lamb – Essays of Elia (1st U.S. edition, the first collection to include the Last Essays)

== Births ==
- January 2 – Frederic Charles Lascelles Wraxall, English writer (died 1865)
- January 15 – Mary Jane Katzmann, Canadian writer, editor and historian (died 1890)
- January 22 – Dora d'Istria, Romanian-Albanian writer (died 1888)
- February 8 – Jules Verne, French novelist and science fiction writer (died 1905)
- February 12 – George Meredith, English novelist and poet (died 1909)
- February 14 – Edmond About, French novelist and journalist (died 1885)
- February 16 – Julia Colman, American writer, educator, activist and editor (died 1909)
- March 20 – Henrik Ibsen, Norwegian dramatist (died 1906)
- April 1 – Lucinda Banister Chandler, American author and reformer (died 1911)
- April 1 – George Barbu Știrbei, Romanian journalist, biographer and patron of the arts (died 1925)
- April 4 – Margaret Oliphant, Scottish novelist and historical writer (died 1897)
- May 12 – Dante Gabriel Rossetti, English poet and artist (died 1882)
- August 9 – B. Beaumont, British author and businesswoman (died 1892)
- August 24 – Gheorghe Chițu, Romanian classical scholar, publisher and journalist (died 1897)
- September 9 – Leo Tolstoy, Russian novelist (died 1910)
- September 17 – Louise Flodin, Swedish journalist (died 1923)
- October 8 – Francisque Sarcey, French journalist and critic (died 1899)
- October 10 – Harriet Newell Kneeland Goff, American author and reformer (died 1901)
- October 17 (bapt.) – Charlotte Chanter, née Kingsley, English botanical writer and novelist (died 1882)
- November 14 – Susannah V. Aldrich, American author and hymnwriter (died 1905)

== Deaths ==
- January 5 – Kobayashi Issa (小林 一茶), Japanese haiku poet (born 1763)
- January 16 – Johann Samuel Ersch, German bibliographer (born 1766)
- January 26 – Lady Caroline Lamb, English novelist (born 1785)
- February 7 – Henry Neele, English poet and scholar (born 1798)
- February 29 – Henry Beekman Livingston, American poet (born 1748)
- March 16 – Johann Georg August Galletti, German historian (born 1750)
- March 28 – Frances Burney, English dramatist (born 1776)
- April 7 – Helena Charlotta Åkerhielm, Swedish dramatist and translator (born 1786)
- April 25 – François-Benoît Hoffman, French dramatist and critic (born 1760)
- May 28 – Anne Seymour Damer, English sculptor and novelist (born 1748)
- June 8 – William Coxe, English historian and travel writer (born 1747)
- June 11 – Dugald Stewart, Scottish Enlightenment philosopher (born 1753)
- June 21 – Leandro Fernández de Moratín, Spanish dramatist and poet (born 1760)
- August 10 – William Cardell, American grammarian and story writer for boys (born 1780)
- October 13 – Vincenzo Monti, Italian poet and dramatist (born 1754)
- November 8 – Thomas Bewick, English writer and natural historian (born 1753)
