= Thomas Cooke (actor) =

English actor

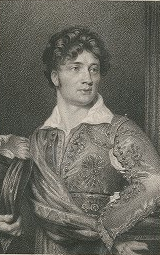
- Born: 23 April 1786; Marylebone, London
- Died: 10 April 1864 (aged 77); London
- Occupation: Actor

Thomas Potter Cooke (23 April 1786 – 10 April 1864) was an English actor.

== Early life ==
He was born on 23 April 1786, in Titchfield Street, Marylebone, London; his father was a surgeon, who died when he was six years old. He sailed, under age, on board the sloop HMS Raven to Toulon, and was present at the Battle of Cape St. Vincent in 1797. After escaping drowning off Cuxhaven, where Raven was lost and the crew had to take refuge in the rigging, he reached England. He sailed again on board HMS Prince of Wales, carrying Rear-Admiral Sir Robert Calder, to the blockade of Brest. The Peace of Amiens of 1802 deprived Cooke of his naval occupation.

== Actor and manager ==
In January 1804, Cooke made his stage début at the Royalty Theatre in Wellclose Square. He was then engaged by Astley for Astley's Amphitheatre where he appeared as Lord Nelson. He subsequently played at the Lyceum, and then joined the company of Henry Erskine Johnston, who opened a theatre in Peter Street, Dublin. In 1809 he was engaged by Robert William Elliston as stage manager of the Surrey Theatre, where he remained a favourite.

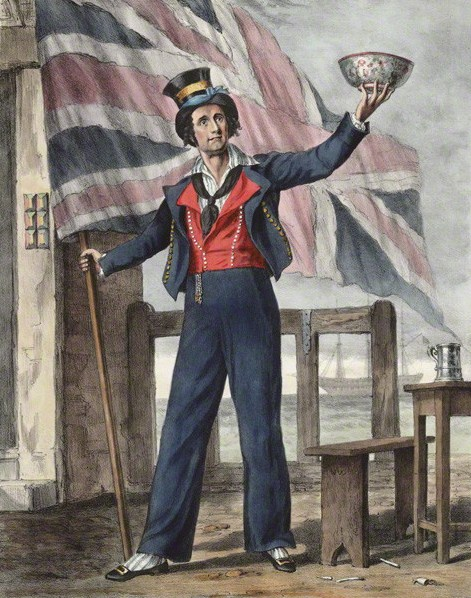
Thomas Potter Cooke in a nautical part

On 19 October 1816, Cooke appeared at Drury Lane as Diego Monez, an officer, in a melodrama, attributed to Robert Bell, and called Watchword, or the Quito Gate. He then played some new characters, mainly foreigners, such as Monsieur Pas in the farce Each for Himself, Almorad, a Moor, in Manuel by Charles Maturin, and Hans Ketzler in George Soane's Castle Spectre.

== Career peak ==
On 9 August 1820, Cooke had major success at the Lyceum as Lord Ruthven, the hero of The Vampyre, and in the following year strengthened his reputation as Dirk Hatteraick in the Witch of Derncleugh, a version of Guy Mannering, George in The Miller's Maid (a melodrama of John Faucit Saville from Robert Bloomfield), and Frankenstein's monster in Presumption; or, the Fate of Frankenstein, Richard Brinsley Peake's 1823 adaptation of Mary Shelley's novel Frankenstein. Cooke thus became the first person to play the iconic role of Frankenstein's monster.

Cooke then joined the Covent Garden Company, and played Zenocles in Ali Pacha, by John Howard Payne, on 19 October 1822, Richard I in Maid Marian on 3 December 1822, and other parts. When, in 1825, Frederick Henry Yates and Daniel Terry took the Adelphi, Cooke was engaged and played Long Tom Coffin in Edward Fitzball's drama The Pilot. At the close of the season he visited Paris, and presented Le Monstre et le Magicien (again playing Frankenstein's monster) 80 successive nights at the Porte-Saint-Martin. In 1827 he was in Edinburgh, where he was frequently seen by Christopher North, who called him "the best sailor out of all sight and hearing that ever trod the stage".

In 1828–9, Cooke was again at the Adelphi. His most conspicuous success was at the Surrey, on 8 June 1829, as William in Douglas Jerrold's Black-Eyed Susan. After playing it over 100 nights there, he was engaged to appear in the play at Covent Garden, where he remained until 1834, when Alfred Bunn, who managed both theatres, transferred him to Drury Lane. Two years later he returned to Covent Garden, to act under Osbaldistone.

== Last years ==
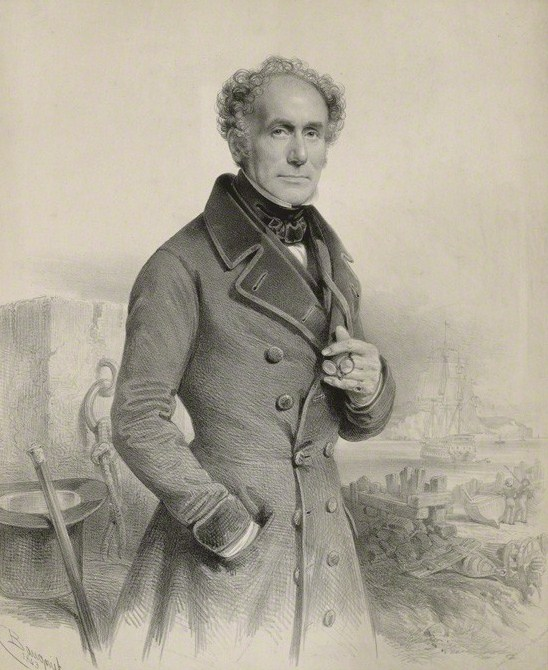
Thomas Potter Cooke, 1843 lithograph

In October 1857, Cooke played as a star at the Standard. For the Jerrold Remembrance Night (29 July 1857) he appeared at the Adelphi as William. His last appearance was at Covent Garden, for the benefit of the Royal Dramatic College, on 29 October 1860, when he once more played William in a selection from Black-Eyed Susan.

Cooke died on 10 April 1864, at 37 Thurloe Square, the house of his son-in-law. After the death of his wife, a few months before his own, he had given up his own houses in Woburn Square and at Ryde. He was buried in Brompton cemetery.

By his will Cooke left £2,000 to the Royal Dramatic College, the interest of which was to be paid for a prize nautical drama. True to the Core, by Angiolo Robson Slous, was played on 8 January 1866.

== Notes ==
Attribution

This article incorporates text from a publication now in the public domain: Stephen, Leslie, ed. (1887). "Cooke, Thomas Potter". Dictionary of National Biography. Vol. 12. London: Smith, Elder & Co.
