= Robert Keeley (comedian) =

Robert Keeley in 1864

Robert Keeley (1793 – 3 February 1869) was an English actor-manager, comedian and female impersonator of the nineteenth century. In 1823 he originated the role of 'Fritz' in Presumption; or, the Fate of Frankenstein, the first known stage adaptation of Mary Shelley's novel Frankenstein.

== Early life ==
Robert Keeley was born in London as one of sixteen children, his father being a watchmaker. Keeley was an apprentice printer to Hansard, but dissatisfied with this career he joined a travelling acting company. He was at the Richmond Theatre in 1813 before moving to Norwich for four years and then to the West London Theatre.

He made his professional London debut at the Olympic Theatre in 1818 as Leporello in Don Giovanni in London, based on Mozart's opera. In 1819 Keeley appeared at the Theatre Royal, Drury Lane, and played the original Jemmy Green in Tom and Jerry, or Life in London by William Thomas Moncrieff at the Adelphi Theatre during 1821–2. At the end of 1821 Keeley appeared at Sadler's Wells Theatre under Daniel Egerton, and in April 1822 he played Jerry in Pierce Egan's Life in London.

== Theatrical career ==
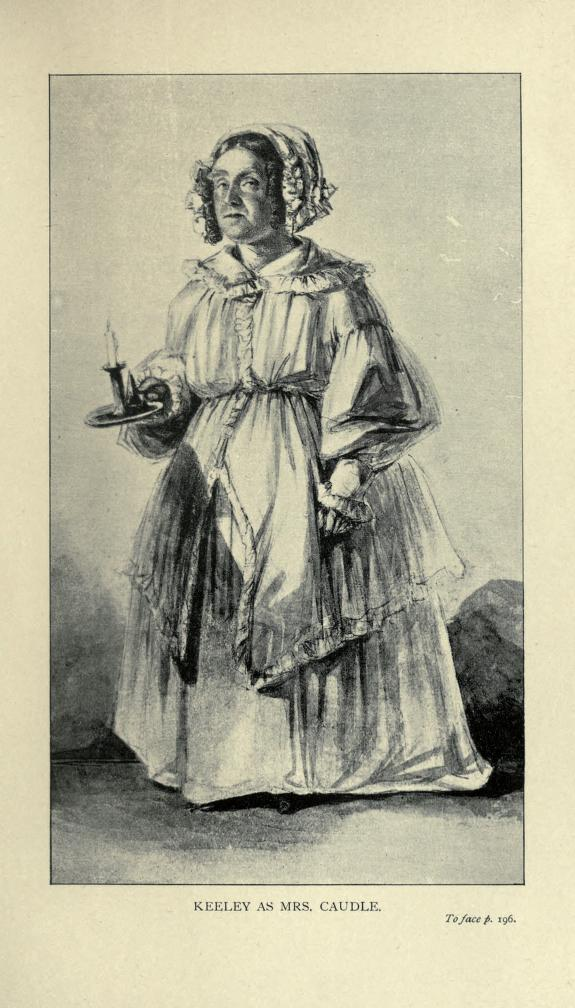
Keeley as Mrs Caudle in Mrs Caudle's Curtain Lectures (1846)

Later in 1822 Keeley appeared with Charles Kemble at the Royal Opera House in Covent Garden. In 1823 he appeared at the English Opera House as the original Fritz in Presumption; or, the Fate of Frankenstein by Richard Brinsley Peake; and the Gardener in Frozen Lake by James Planché, both roles having been written for him. Returning to Covent Garden for several years, Keeley went on to appear in Ben Jonson's Every Man in his Humour and Richard Brinsley Sheridan's The Rivals.

On 26 June 1829 he married Mary Anne Goward who afterwards was billed as Mrs Keeley and who regularly appeared with him. From 1832 to 1842, they acted at Covent Garden, at the Adelphi with John Buckstone, at the Olympic with Charles Mathews, and at the Theatre Royal, Drury Lane with William Charles Macready. In 1837 they visited America, but the venture was not a success and they returned to Great Britain in 1838 and joined the company of Lucia Elizabeth Vestris, acting with her until 1841.

With his wife he managed the Lyceum Theatre from 1844 to 1847, putting on, among other productions, adaptations from the works of Charles Dickens; here he played the nurse Sarah Gamp in Martin Chuzzlewit, for which role he was coached by Dickens himself, Trotty Veck in The Chimes, and Mrs Caudle in Mrs Caudle's Curtain Lectures by Douglas Jerrold. It was said of the 5' 2" red-headed Keeley "however he may multiply his characters, vary his dresses, his wigs, or his words, it is Robert Keeley, and nothing else".

== Later years ==
From August 1850 to 1852 Keeley shared the management of the Princess's Theatre with Charles Kean, appearing as Sir Andrew Aguecheek in Twelfth Night, and a carrier in a performance of Henry IV in a Royal Command Performance before Queen Victoria at Windsor Castle. Keeley retired from managing the Princess's Theatre in 1852; however, in November 1852 he played Sir Hugh Evans in The Merry Wives of Windsor alongside his wife Mary Anne Keeley and their daughter, Mary Lucy Keeley. The Keeleys then appeared at the Haymarket Theatre, the Adelphi Theatre and the Olympic Theatre. In September 1856 they appeared at the Theatre Royal, Drury Lane. He played a parody of himself in Keeley Worried by Buckstone (1853) opposite John Baldwin Buckstone.

Robert Keeley's last appearance before his retirement was at the Theatre Royal, Drury Lane in March 1857, in Thomas Morton's A Cure for the Heartache. He appeared in benefit performances in May 1861 as Touchstone in a scene from As You Like It at the Royal Opera House in Covent Garden, and in another in March 1862 he appeared in John Oxenford's 1835 farce Twice Killed.

Robert Keeley died on 3 February 1869 at his home in Brompton, London, and was buried in Brompton Cemetery. He had two daughters with his wife: Mary Lucy (c. 1830–1870) and Louise (1835–1877), both of whom followed their parents on to the stage. Mary Lucy married the writer Albert Richard Smith, while Louise married the criminal advocate Montagu Williams, later Queen's Counsel.
