= Presumption; or, the Fate of Frankenstein =

1823 stage play based on the novel Frankenstein

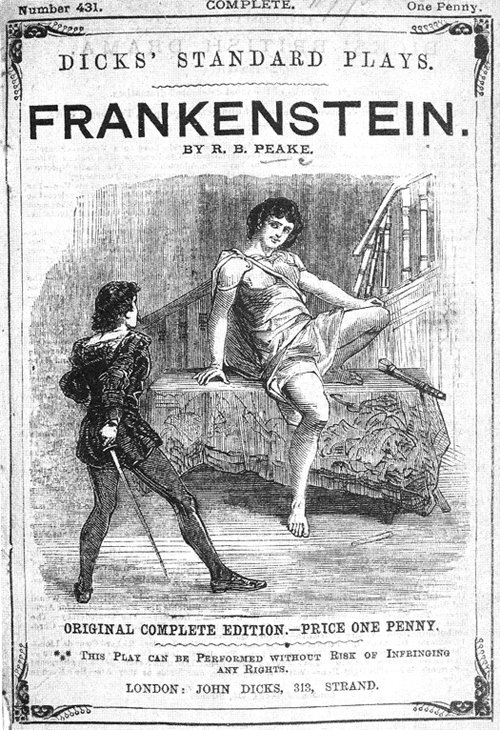
Cover of Peakes' Presumption; or, the Fate of Frankenstein (1823)

Presumption; or, the Fate of Frankenstein is an 1823 play in three acts by Richard Brinsley Peake loosely based on the 1818 novel Frankenstein; or, The Modern Prometheus by Mary Shelley. It is the first recorded theatrical adaptation of the novel. The popularity of the play, which was performed thirty-seven times at the English Opera House in the West End during the 1823 season, caused a second printing of Shelley's novel and a proliferation of other theatrical adaptations.

The play marks the first recorded appearance of Victor Frankenstein’s servile assistant character, who is known commonly in pop culture as Igor. Here, the character is named 'Fritz', just as he is named in the 1931 film adaptation. Such a character does not exist in the original novel. Peake also wrote the famous line, "It lives!"

On 29 August 1823, Shelley attended the play in London during its original West End run. It was the only known adaptation of Frankenstein that Shelley saw during her lifetime, and she would write that its success solidified her status as someone "famous."

== Background ==
After the Restoration in 1660 and the lifting of the Puritan ban on London theatre, royal patents allowing for the staging of plays were awarded to the "Theatres Royal" (the Theatre Royal, Drury Lane and the Royal Opera House at Covent Garden) while all the other theatres, even in 1823, could only perform melodramas, burlesque, pantomimes, puppet theatre, musical entertainments, and spectacles. This meant that Richard Brinsley Peake's Presumption had to include music, pantomime and spectacle in order for it legally to be staged. Thus, the play had songs that the Creature could react to, mime as the Creature was mute, and spectacle in the form of an avalanche in the finale. The drama opened on Monday, 28 July 1823, at the head of a programme that included two farces, The Rival Soldiers and Sharp and Flat. In its original form the popularity of the play, witnessed by thousands each night, saw it run for thirty-seven performances at the English Opera House in the West End during a summer season that lasted for three months.

The acclaim Presumption received in London was soon emulated overseas when it was performed in New York City in January 1825, and at the Porte St. Martin in Paris in 1826 – on both occasions with great success. In the meantime, support for the play in London continued through to 1824 when it was performed three times at the Theatre Royal in Covent Garden. The 1824 performances were presented with a different cast with the exception of T. P. Cooke and Robert Keeley, who continued in their roles from the previous year. The play was performed for several evenings in 1827, with William Bennett as Frankenstein, Richard John O. Smith as the Creature, and Keeley as Fritz. The English Opera House occasionally revived Presumption as an afterpiece until at least 1850.

== Mary Shelley ==
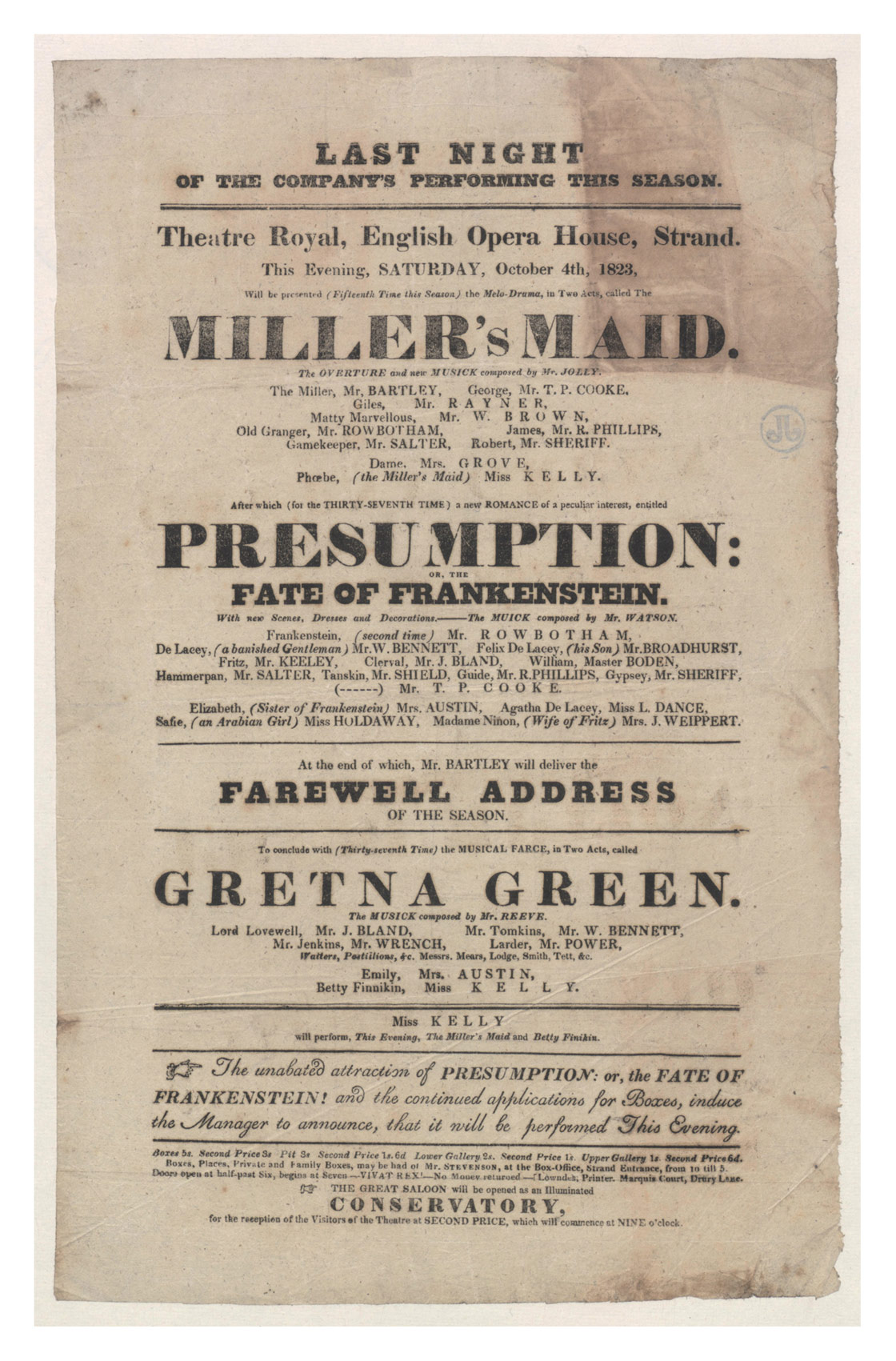
1823 playbill advertising the closing night of Presumption; or, the Fate of Frankenstein

Presumption was seen by Mary Shelley and her father William Godwin on 29 August 1823 at the English Opera House shortly after her return to England. Shelley approved of the way the Creature, played by T. P. Cooke in over 350 performances during his acting career, was represented by a series of dashes in the advertising. To capitalise on the success of the play, Godwin arranged for his daughter's novel Frankenstein to be reprinted in two volumes with emendations by himself.

Shelley, writing to her late husband's friend Leigh Hunt, said of the play:

But lo & behold! I found myself famous!—Frankenstein had prodigious success as a drama & was about to be repeated for the 23rd night at the English opera house. The play bill amused me extremely, for in the list of dramatis personæ came, ⸻ by Mr. T. Cooke: this nameless mode of naming the unameable is rather good. On Friday Aug. 29th Jane My father William & I went to the theatre to see it. Wallack looked very well as F—he is at the beginning full of hope & expectation—at the end of the 1st Act. the stage represents a room with a staircase leading to F workshop—he goes to it and you see his light at a small window, through which a frightened servant peeps, who runs off in terror when F. exclaims "It lives!"—Presently F himself rushes in horror & trepidation from the room and while still expressing his agony & terror ⸻ throws down the door of the laboratory, leaps the staircase & presents his unearthly & monstrous person on the stage. The story is not well managed—but Cooke played ⸻'s part extremely well—his seeking as it were for support—his trying to grasp at the sounds he heard—all indeed he does was well imagined & executed. I was much amused, & it appeared to excite a breathless eagerness in the audience—it was a third piece a scanty pit filled at half-price—& all stayed til it was over. They continue to play it even now.

== Synopsis ==
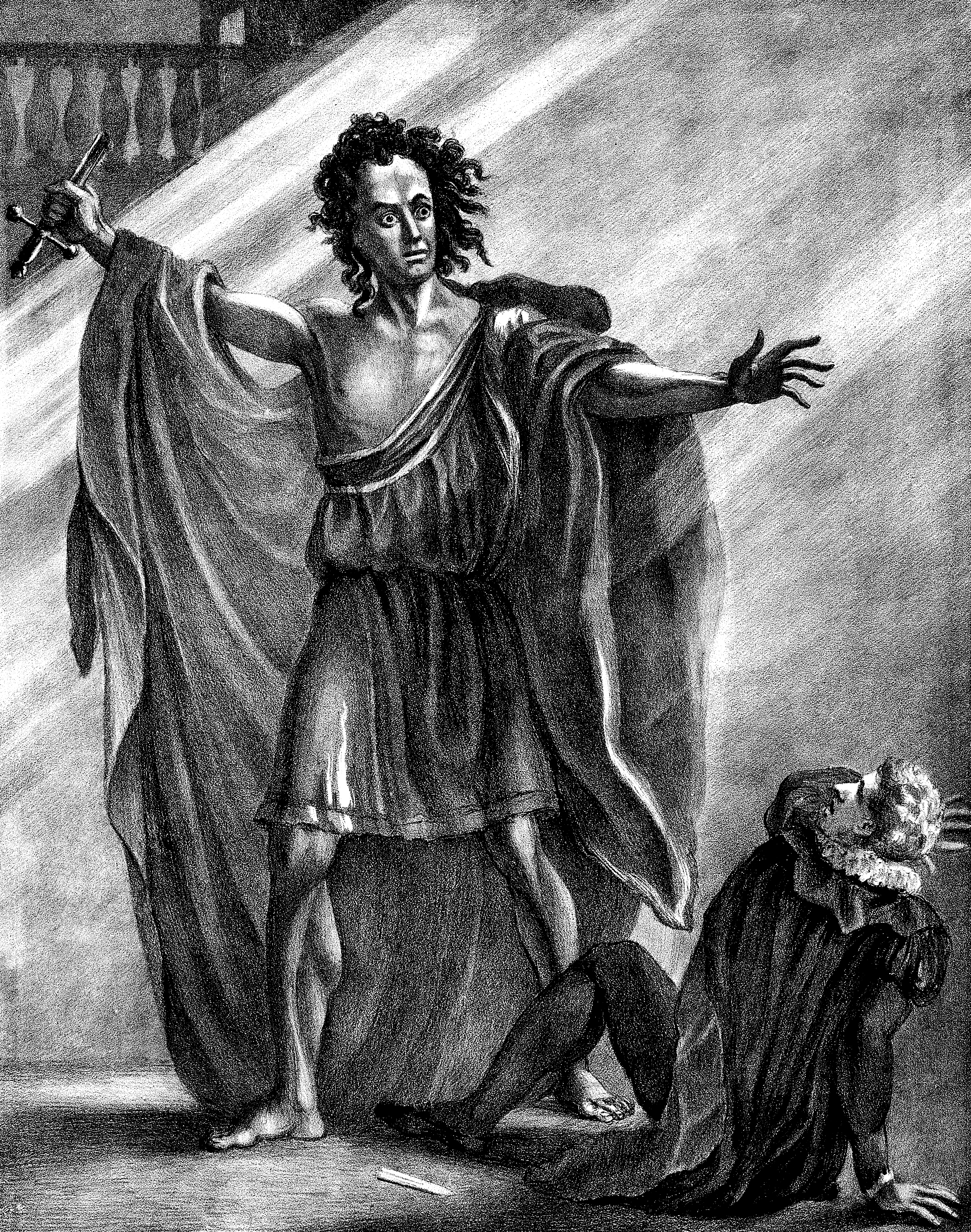
T. P. Cooke as --------- in Presumption

Set in Geneva 'and its vicinity', Peake's adaptation of Mary Shelley's novel portrays the story of Frankenstein as he creates a mute blue-skinned Creature, known as the Hobgoblin. Often shown through the concerned eyes of his bumbling servant, Fritz, and his esteemed friend, Clerval, Frankenstein's work is brought to light. This play brings Mary Shelley's famous characters to life in a series of three acts, each of which highlight the important themes of community and romance.

In the opening scene, Clerval shows concern for Frankenstein's health and continuous work in his laboratory, just like in Shelley's novel. However, in the play, Clerval offers to pay Fritz to find out what work Frankenstein is doing. Clerval's actions are significant by giving the audience a feeling of community, that Frankenstein is not alone, which is very different from the isolation established in Shelley's novel.

By having Fritz and Clerval with Frankenstein, there is a diffusion of responsibility for the creation of the Hobgoblin. Fritz states to Clerval, "Now my shrewd guess, sir, is that, like Dr. Faustus, my master is raising the devil," sharing that he has a good idea of what Frankenstein is up to (Presumption, Act I, scene I). Neither Clerval nor Fritz try to stop Frankenstein in the midst of his work, even though they show concern for his welfare. The creation of the Creature happens off stage, during which the audience hears Victor Frankenstein cry 'it lives!', and then run on stage as his creation breaks out of the laboratory and reveals itself to the audience. Frankenstein draws a sword and points it at the Creature, who promptly snatches it and breaks it in two. Throwing Victor Frankenstein to the floor, the Creature runs up the staircase and exits the building through a window.

Although Frankenstein destroys the Creature in the end by firing upon it with a pistol, triggering an avalanche which kills both of them, his friends rush to try to help him if they can. Fritz states, "Oh, I don’t know, there’s Mr Frankenstein gone after the great creature, Mr. Clerval and Mr. Felix have gone after Mr. Frankenstein, and I’m going after them all," displaying the community the men share with Frankenstein (Presumption, Act III, scene IV).

== Cast ==
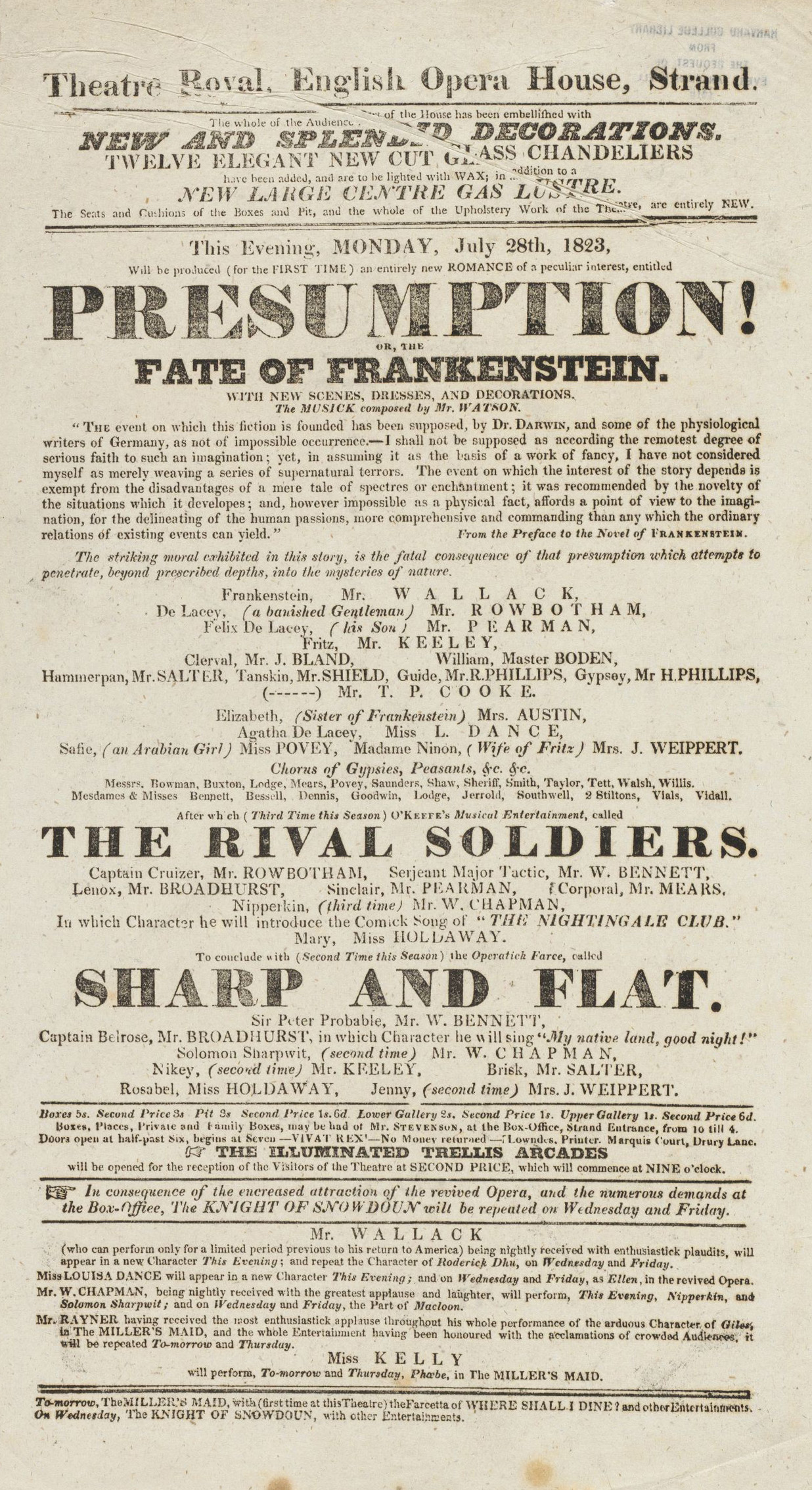
1823 playbill advertising the opening night of Presumption; or, the Fate of Frankenstein

The cast on the opening night in London on 28 July 1823 were:

- Victor Frankenstein ... James William Wallack
- Clerval (his friend, in love with Elizabeth) ... James Bland
- William (brother of Frankenstein) ... Master Boden
- 'Fritz' (servant of Frankenstein) ... Robert Keeley
- De Lacey (a banished gentleman—blind) ... Mr. Rowbotham
- Felix DeLacey (his son) ... William Pearman
- Tanskin (a gipsy) ... Mr. Shield
- Hammerpan (a tinker) ... Mr. Salter
- First Gipsy ... Mr. H. Phillips
- A Guide (an old man) ... Mr. R. Phillips
- --------- ... Mr. T. P. Cooke
- Elizabeth (sister of Frankenstein) ... Mrs. Austin
- Agatha De Lacey ... Louisa Dance
- Safie (an Arabian girl, betrothed to Felix) ... Mary Ann Povey
- Madame Ninon (wife to Fritz) ... Mrs. J. Weippert
- Gipsies, Peasants, Choristers, and Dancers (Male and Female)
