= Le Miroir des événemens actuels, ou la Belle au plus offrant =

1790 short story by François-Félix Nogaret

Le Miroir des événemens actuels, ou la Belle au plus offrant (The Looking Glass of Actuality, or Beauty to the Highest Bidder) is a political parable about scientific progress published in 1790 by François-Félix Nogaret featuring an inventor named "Wak-wik-vauk-an-son-frankésteïn", an apparent reference to Jacques de Vaucanson and Christian Gottlieb Kratzenstein, mispelled as "Frankenstein" in the news of year 1788 about the prize awarded by him in 1780.

It has been suggested that Nogaret's story may have influenced Mary Shelley's Frankenstein, with a number of similarities between the two stories. However, there is no evidence Shelley had read it.
