= The Haunted Inn =

1828 play

- Original language: English
- Written by: Richard Brinsley Peake
- Genre: Melodrama

Premiere
- Date: 31 January 1828
- Place: Theatre Royal, Drury Lane

The Haunted Inn is an 1828 melodrama by the British writer Richard Brinsley Peake. It was first acted at the Theatre Royal, Drury Lane and was part of a group of plays that used a country inn as a setting for sinister or threatening events.

== Bibliography ==
- Burwick, Frederick. A History of Romantic Literature. John Wiley & Sons, 2019.
- Kabatchnik, Amnon. Blood on the Stage, 1800 to 1900: Milestone Plays of Murder, Mystery, and Mayhem. Rowman & Littlefield, 2017.
- Nicoll, Allardyce . A History of English Drama 1660-1900, Volume 4. Cambridge University Press, 2009.
