= Elizabeth Caroline Grey =

English author

Elizabeth Caroline Grey (1798–1869), aka Mrs. Colonel Grey or Mrs. Grey, was a prolific English author of over 30 romance novels, silver fork novels, Gothic novels, sensation fiction and Penny Dreadfuls, active between the 1820s and 1867. There is some controversy about the details of her life story, and if she actually authored any penny dreadfuls.

== Biography ==
Commenting on her literary reputation in 1859, American critic Samuel Austin Allibone said Grey "has fairly earned a title to be ranked as one of the most popular novelists of the day." That reputation has not lasted; her life and body of work today are fairly obscure outside of a few specialised fields of study such as Victorian literature and vampire literature. Grey is probably most often remembered today as being the first woman to write and publish a vampire story; one of her earliest stories, The Skeleton Count, or The Vampire Mistress, it was first published in 1828 in a weekly paper called The Casket.

Elizabeth's maiden name was Duncan and she was the niece of "Miss Duncan", a famous actress of the late 18th century. Elizabeth married "Colonel Grey", a reporter for the Morning Chronicle, about whom very little else is known. Elizabeth Grey worked at a London school for girls. In her spare time wrote silver fork novels, such as Sybil Lennard (1846), about a Swiss orphan who rises to become a governess in England; it has been described by John Sutherland as resembling the fiction of the Brontë sisters. She also wrote penny dreadfuls such as Murder Will Out (1860) and The Iron Mask (1847). Grey's ability to write both "proper" fiction for polite society, and sensational Gothic and penny dreadfuls (some of which were initially published anonymously), earned her a broad audience in her day.

== Literary hoax ==
There is suspicion that not all the books attributed to Mrs. Grey were written by her, indeed that her life story as traditionally told (such as in this article) may be a total fabrication. Helen R. Smith, in "New Light on Sweeney Todd, Thomas Peckett Prest, James Malcolm Rymer and Elizabeth Caroline Grey," came to the conclusion that James Malcolm Rymer was the author of a string of Penny Dreadfuls confusingly attributed to Mrs. Grey. The penny dreadfuls were published by Edward Lloyd, and "It is hard to imagine that Elizabeth Caroline Grey, popular author of a large number of 3 volume silver fork novels, could have moonlighted as a penny-a-liner."

Grey's name never appeared in any of these penny dreadfuls published by Lloyd, but she was attributed as the author by Andrew De Ternant in an article in Notes & Queries in 1922. In fact, it's now known that Andrew De Ternant was a "notorious liar", as revealed in an investigation by Patrick Spedding in the 2010 paper "The Many Mrs Greys: Confusion and Lies about Elizabeth Caroline Grey, Catherine Maria Grey, Maria Georgina Grey and Others". Indeed, Spedding says the traditional life story of Grey, which can be ultimately sourced back to Andrew De Ternant's version, and later replicated in respectable encyclopaedias such as John Sutherland's Companion to Victorian Fiction, is a total fabrication.

== The Skeleton Count, or The Vampire Mistress ==
The Skeleton Count, or The Vampire Mistress (1828) is a penny dreadful allegedly written by Grey (see above concerning dispute of penny dreadful authorships). In 1995, anthologist Peter Haining claimed it was the first vampire story written and published by a woman. Haining claimed that it was first published in the English weekly paper The Casket in 1828 (no relation to other magazines of the same name) and that a collector brought him the only known copy of the story. Contrary to Haining's claim, no other editors have included the story in collections of vampire tales, and the provenance of the tale is suspect. Haining has espoused controversial literary positions before, involving the alleged historicity of the popular penny dreadful Sweeney Todd.

== Works ==
Works by Elizabeth Caroline Grey.

- The Skeleton Count, or The Vampire Mistress, in 1828's The Casket. (penny dreadful).
- De Lisle: or, The Distrustful Man. London: Bull, 1828.
- The Trials of Life. London: E. Bull, 1829
- Alice Seymour: A Tale. London: J. Hatchard and Son. 1831
- The Duke. London: Bentley, 1839.
- The Young Prima Donna. London: Bentley, 1840.
- The Little Wife, and The Baronet's Daughters. London: Saunders and Otley, 1841.
- The Belle of the Family: or, The Jointure: A Novel. London: Newby, 1843.
- The Old Dower House: A Tale of Bygone Days. London: Newby, 1844.
- The Bosom Friend: A Novel. London: Newby, 1845.
- The Gambler's Wife. London: Newby, 1845.
- Hyacinthe; or, The Contrast. London: Newby, 1845.
- Sybil Lennard. London: Newby, 1846.
- The Ordeal by Touch. 1846. (penny dreadful)
- The Daughters. London: Newby, 1847.
- The Iron Mask. 1847. (penny dreadful)
- Aline: An Old Friend's Story. London: Newby, 1848.
- The Rectory Guest. London: Newby, 1849.
- Mabel Carrington: A Novel. London: Newby, 1849.
- An Old Country House. London: Newby, 1850.
- Mary Seaham. London: Colburn, 1852.
- The Young Husband. London: Hurst and Blackett, 1854.
- Sibyl's Little Daughter: A Sequel to The Gipsy's Daughter. London: Thomas Cautley Newby, 1854
- Cousin Harry: A Novel. London: Hurst and Blackett, 1858.
- Two Hearts Tale. London: Hurst and Blackett, 1858.
- The Opera-Singers Wife. London, 1860.
- The Little Beauty: A Novel. London: Hurst and Blackett, 1860.
- Murder Will Out. 1860. (penny dreadful)
- One of the Family. 1861.
- The Autobiography of Frank, the Happiest Dog that Ever Lived. London, 1861.
- Passages in the Life of a Fast Young Lady. London: Hurst and Blackett, 1862.
- Good Society: or, Contrasts of Character. London: Hurst and Blackett, 1863.
- Love's Sacrifice. London: Hurst and Blackett, 1867.
