= Anton Philipp Reclam =

German publisher (1807–1896)

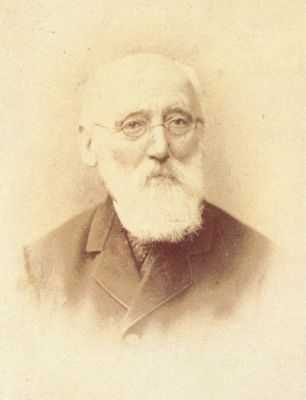
Anton Philipp Reclam

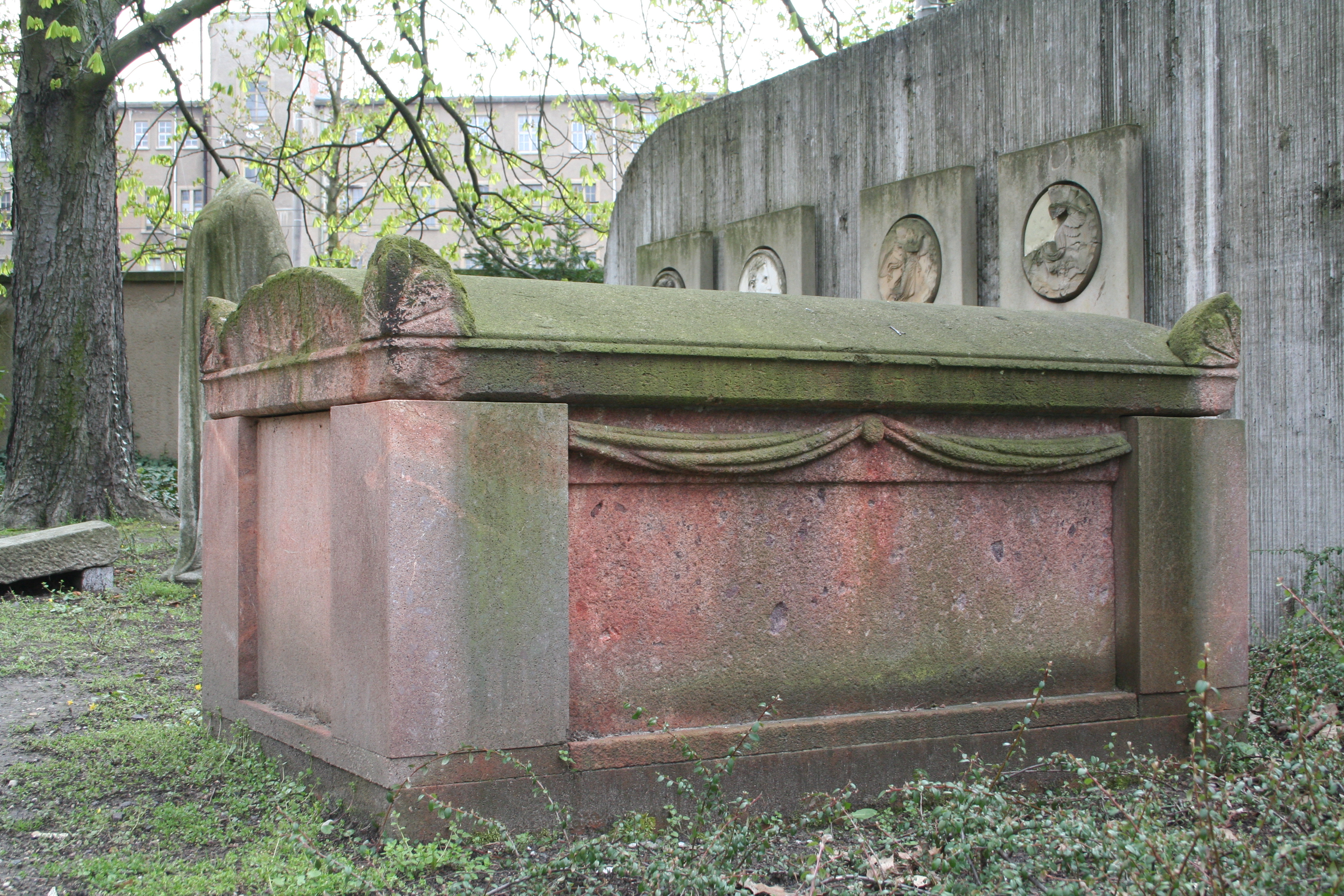
Anton Philipp Reclam's Grave in the Old St. John's Cemetery in Leipzig

Anton Philipp Reclam (1807 in Leipzig – 1896 in Leipzig) was a German publisher and founder of the Reclam press.

== Life ==
Reclam established his company in Leipzig in 1828 as "Philipp Reclam jun." to distinguish it from his father's company. After the 1867 lifting of the German copyright on authors deceased before 1837, Reclam introduced the successful Universal-Bibliothek, which offered affordable editions of classic German and foreign texts.
