= Lucinda Banister Chandler =

American social reformer, author, and leader in the social purity movement

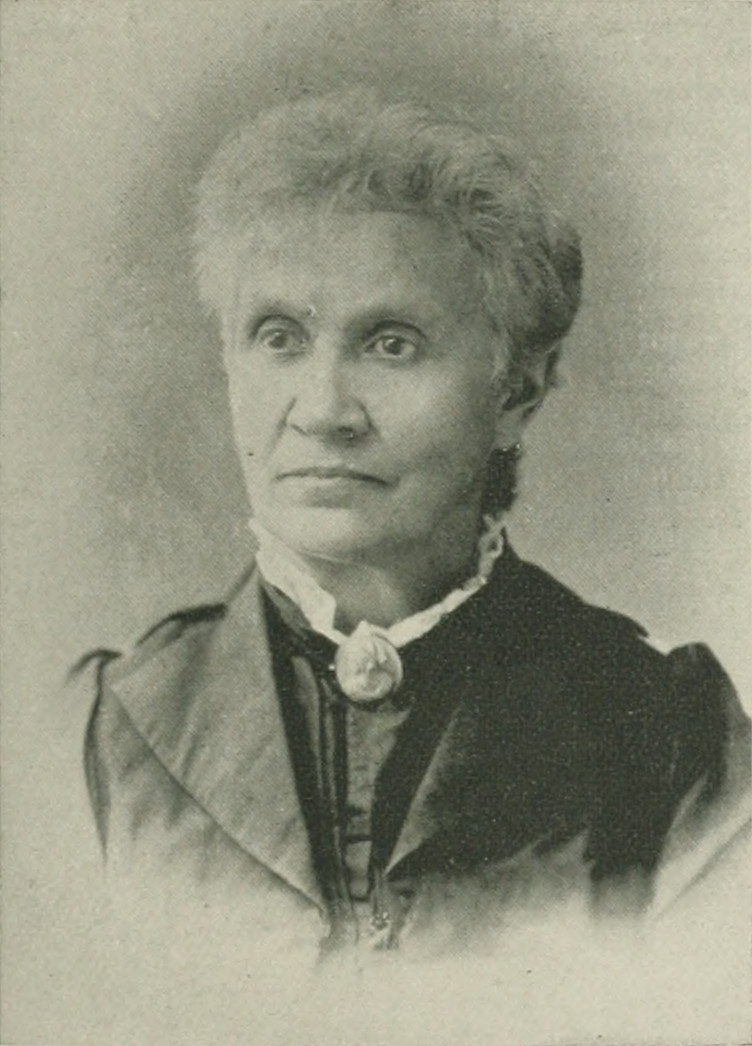
- Photo in A Woman of the Century
- Born: Lucinda Banister; April 1, 1828; Potsdam, New York, U.S.
- Died: 1911 (aged 82–83)
- Education: St. Lawrence Academy
- Occupations: social reformer, author
- Spouse: John H. Chandler
- Writing career
- Language: English

Lucinda Chandler (née Banister; April 1, 1828 – 1911) was an American social reformer and author of the long nineteenth century. Her work focused on dress and labor reform, spiritualism, and suffrage. She was also a leader in the social purity movement. Her writing included "The divineness of marriage", "Moral education of labor and the labor problem", "Subsistence and justice", and "What is social purity and how to attain it?" A spinal injury as an infant caused a life of invalidism. Elizabeth Boynton Harbert was a colleague.

== Early life and education ==
Lucinda Banister was born in Potsdam, New York, April 1, 1828. Her parents were Silas Banister and Eliza Smith, both of New England birth and ancestry.

Chandler suffered a spinal injury in early infancy from a fall, which caused a life of invalidism and extreme suffering. As a child, she was fond of books and study, and when she entered St. Lawrence Academy (now, State University of New York at Potsdam), at nine years of age, her teacher registered her as two years older, because of her advancement in studies and seeming maturity of years. At the age of 13, her first great disappointment came, when her school course was suspended, never to be resumed, by the severe development of her spinal malady. For several years, even reading was denied to her.

== Career ==
In the winter of 1870–71, she wrote "Motherhood, Its Power Over Human Destiny," while recuperating from a long illness, and it was so warmly received in Vineland, New Jersey, that it was afterwards published in booklet form. That introduced her to many thinking women of Boston, where in 1871–72, she held parlor meetings and organized a body of women who were pledged to work for the promotion of enlightened parenthood as well as an equal and high standard of purity for both sexes: the Moral Education Society of Boston.

Societies were formed in New York City, Philadelphia and Washington, D.C., by the efforts of Chandler and with the cooperation of prominent women. That was the first work in this country in the line of educational standards for the elevation and purity of the relations of men and women, inside as well as outside of marriage. The publication of essays, "A Mother's Aid, "Children's Rights" and the "Divineness of Marriage," written by her, followed and furnished a literature for the agitation of questions that later were widely discussed.

During one of the long periods of prostration and confinement to her room, to which Chandler was subject, she commenced study on the lines of political economy as a mental tonic and helpful agency to restoration. After her recovery, she wrote extensively for reform publications upon finance reform, the land question and industrial problems. In Chicago, in 1880, the Margaret Fuller Society was founded, especially to interest women in those subjects and the principles of Americanism.

Chandler was a reformer, associated with "Christian Socialism" and "Americanism". A lifelong advocate of the total abstinence principle, Chandler served as vice-president of the Woman's Christian Temperance Alliance of Illinois. She was the first president of the Chicago Moral Educational Society, formed in 1882. She was an advocate of Christian socialism, and a firm believer in the final triumph of the Christian idea of the brotherhood of man as a practical and controlling principle in commercial and industrial systems.

== Personal life ==
At the age of 20, she married John H. Chandler, who was born and raised in Potsdam. He was a carpenter and joiner by trade. He was also a music teacher and gave musical concerts and instruction in music. Their only child was John Nelson who drowned at the age of four years.

Chandler's marriage was a happy one. Her husband's care made it possible for her to enjoy a period of usefulness in later life.

Lucinda Banister Chandler died in 1911.

== Selected works ==
- "Motherhood, Its Power Over Human Destiny"
- "A Mother's Aid"
- "Children's Rights"
- "Divineness of Marriage"
- "Liberty and The Ballot for Women"
- "Moral education of labor and the labor problem"
- "Subsistence and justice"
- "What issocial purity and. how to attain it?"
