= Reclam =

German publishing house

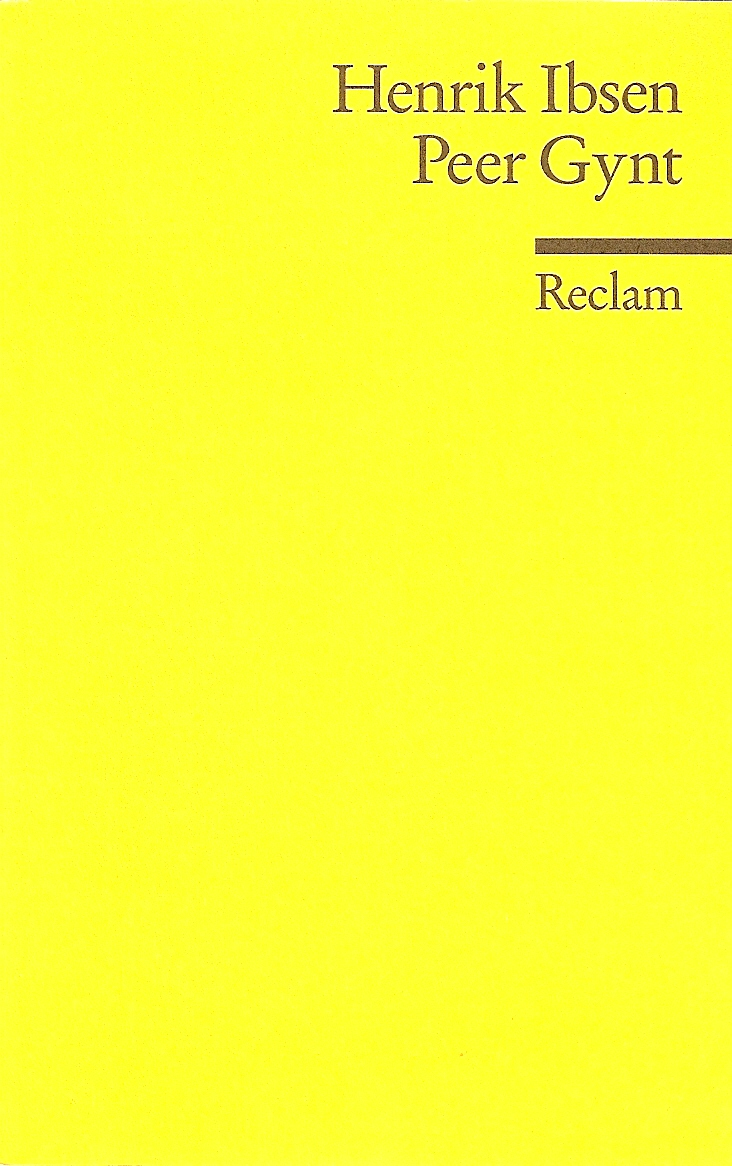
Reclam Universal-Bibliothek edition of Henrik Ibsen's Peer Gynt

Reclam Verlag is a German publishing house, established in Leipzig in 1828 by Anton Philipp Reclam (1807–1896). It is particularly well known for the "little yellow books" of its Universal-Bibliothek ("universal library"), simple paperback editions of literary classics for schools and universities.

== History ==
In 1802 Charles Henri Reclam (1776–1844), whose family originated from Savoy, had moved to Leipzig where he established a bookselling business. His son Anton Philipp completed his apprenticeship as a book printer and bookseller and borrowed money to purchase the Literarisches Museum, a lending library in Leipzig-Mitte, Grimmaische Strasse. During the Restoration period and under the terms of the Carlsbad Decrees, it quickly evolved to a centre of intellectual and literary circles of the pre-revolutionary Vormärz era.

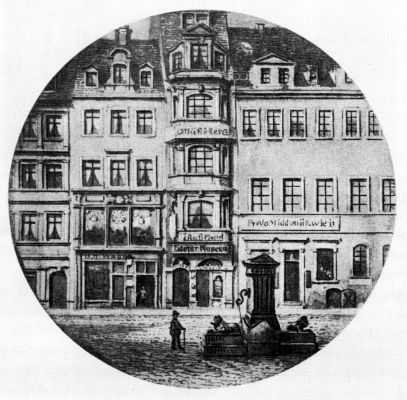
Literarisches Museum bookshop in Leipzig, c. 1830

On 1 October 1828 Anton Philipp Reclam founded his own publishing house, first named Verlag des literarischen Museums. When he sold the library in 1837, the company was renamed Philipp Reclam jun. Two years later, he also acquired a Leipzig printing workshop and he was then able to produce his books in large numbers. However, the liberal leaning tone of his publications earned him a sales ban in the countries of the Austrian Empire and a prison sentence by a Leipzig court for publishing a German translation of Thomas Paine's The Age of Reason (Das Zeitalter der Vernunft).

After the failed German revolutions of 1848–49, Reclam changed his policies and concentrated on the mass distribution of literary classics. From 1858 to 1865 he published the complete works of William Shakespeare.

In 1856 the German Confederation passed a law giving 30 years copyright protection to the works of all authors who had died before 9 November 1837. From 9 November 1867, when all these rights ended, Reclam was able to publish German Enlightenment authors like Goethe, Schiller, Lessing and many others, without needing to pay any royalties, and thus sell them for lower prices. The first title of the Universal-Bibliothek series, Goethe's Faust I, was published on 10 November 1867.

The Universal-Bibliothek enabled a wide range of literary texts to be made widely available, contributing significantly to popular education and the promotion of European classical literature. The firm strongly relied on the latest production methods and marketing strategies to attain consistently low sales prices. When Anton Philipp Reclam died in 1896, his Universal-Bibliothek comprised about 3,500 books. Title number 5,000 was published in 1908.

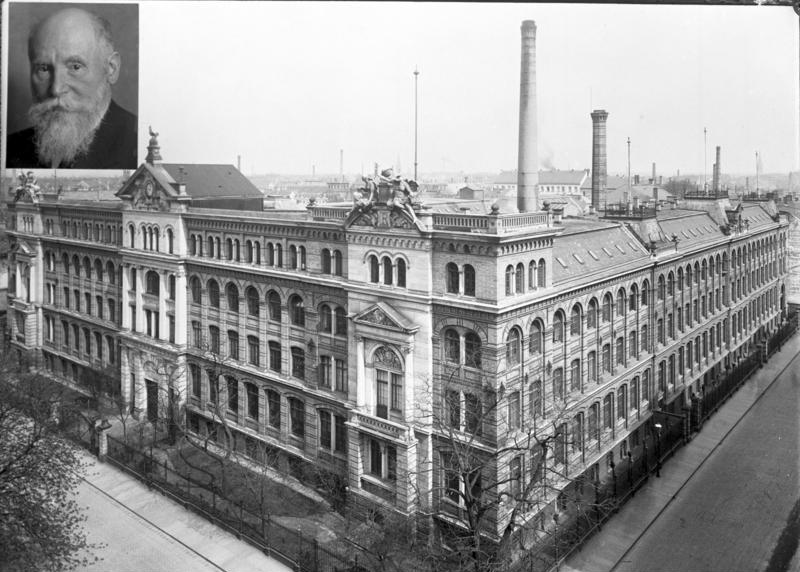
Reclam publishing house in Leipzig, 1928

In 1912 Reclam became the first company to introduce book vending machines, designed by Peter Behrens, which soon became a great success and were found at train stations, hospitals and army barracks all over Germany. After World War I, it promoted the works of contemporary German-speaking authors, such as Klabund, Thomas Mann, Arthur Schnitzler, Hugo von Hofmannsthal, Gerhart Hauptmann, Franz Werfel, Stefan Zweig, Arnold Zweig, and Ricarda Huch. The publisher celebrated its centenary in 1928, with Nobel laureate Thomas Mann delivering the main speech.

During Nazi rule in Germany, Reclam was forbidden to publish books by Jewish authors, including Heinrich Heine and Ferdinand Lassalle, and works of 'politically unreliable' writers like Thomas Mann, Stefan Zweig, and Franz Werfel. In an allied bombing raid on Leipzig in World War II on 4 December 1943, its building was severely damaged and 450 tons of books were destroyed.

After the partition of Germany in the aftermath of the war, the publishing house was divided after its owner, Ernst Reclam, was partially dispossessed in Leipzig, then part of the Soviet occupation zone. In September 1947, Reclam established a subsidiary in Stuttgart in the American occupation zone (later part of West Germany), which finally became the new main office in 1950. The original publishing house in Leipzig remained, but was nationalized by the socialist regime of East Germany.

Both the West and the East German businesses continued to publish affordable paperback books. Reclam in Stuttgart introduced distinctive yellow covers for its Universal-Bibliothek series of German classics in 1970. In 1980, the company's West German head office moved from Stuttgart to new premises in nearby Ditzingen. After German reunification in 1990, the East German branch in Leipzig was reprivatised. The Leipzig office was closed in March 2006. The company remains a family owned business.

=== Museum ===
The Reclam Museum opened on 24 October 2018 in Leipzig. It is at Kreuzstraße 12, opposite the building which housed the firm's original headquarters.

The museum has over 10,000 volumes of historic books published by the company and related ephemera, including the autographs of Hermann Hesse and Thomas Mann and one of the firm's book vending machines. The collection was put together over a period of more than 50 years by Hans-Jochen Marquardt, the director of the museum, who began collecting the material when he was 14 years old. His father, Hans Marquardt, was the director of the East German Reclam business from 1961 to 1986.

== Publishing programme ==
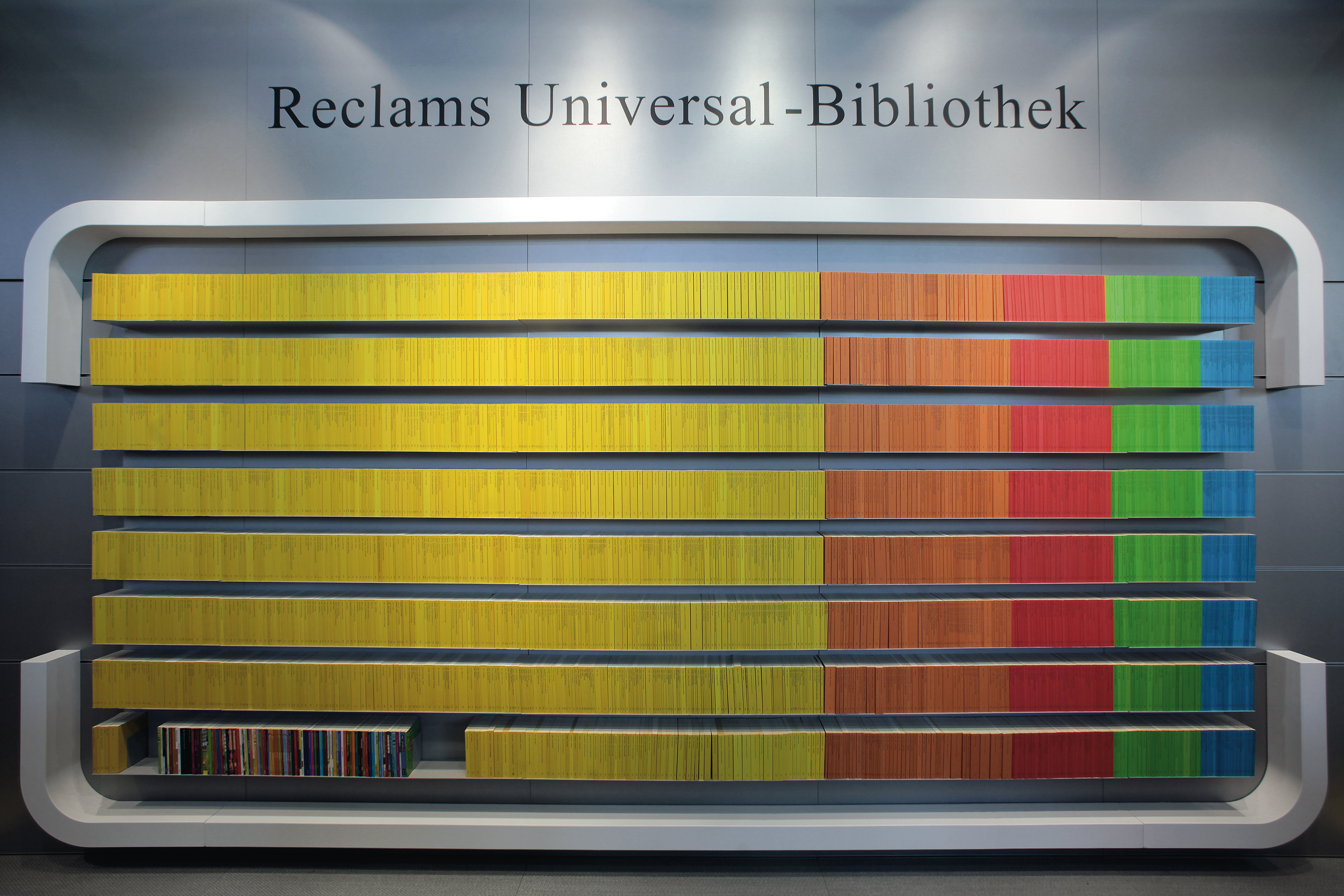
Complete editions of Reclams Universal-Bibliothek (2009)

The popular yellow books series cover classic works of the German language and classics of other languages translated into German. Annotated foreign language classics in their original language (English, French, Spanish, Italian, Latin, and Russian) have red covers. Bilingual books (German and the original language) have orange covers, study guides are blue, the original historical sources are in green, and non-fiction books (politics, history, society, natural sciences, art, music and religion) are in magenta.
