= Richard Brinsley Peake =

English dramatist

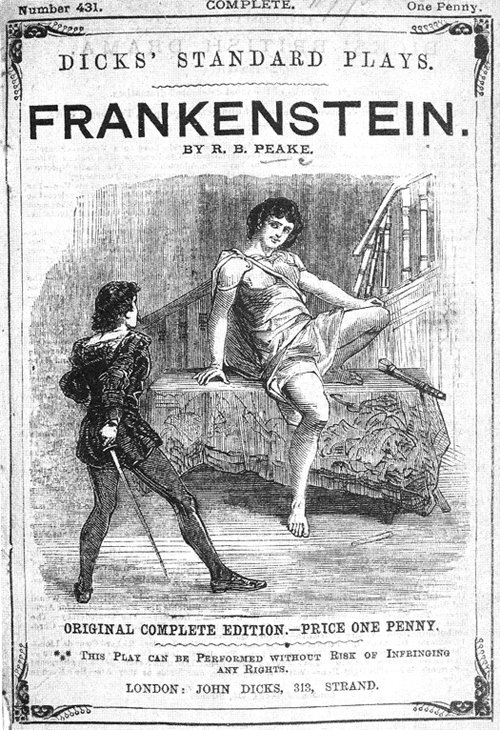
Cover of Peakes' Presumption; or, the Fate of Frankenstein (1823)

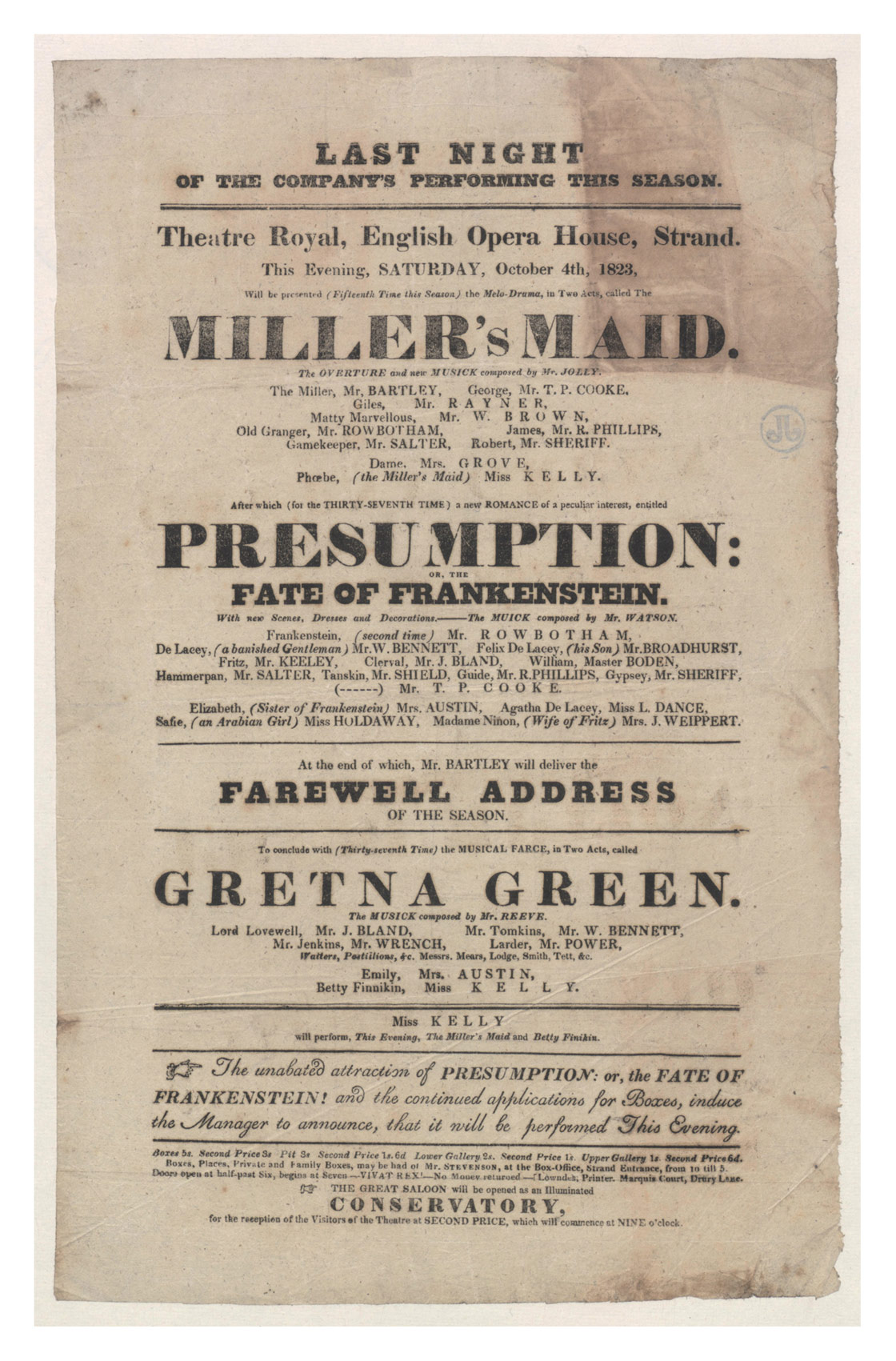
Playbill from 1823 advertising Presumption; or, the Fate of Frankenstein

Richard Brinsley Peake (19 February 1792 – 4 October 1847) was an English dramatist of the early nineteenth century best remembered today for his 1823 play Presumption; or, the Fate of Frankenstein, a work based on the novel Frankenstein by Mary Shelley. It was Peake, not Shelley, who wrote the famous line, "It lives!"

== Early life ==
Richard Brinsley Peake was born in Gerrard Street in Soho, London, the son of Richard Peake, who for forty years worked in the Treasury Office of the Theatre Royal, Drury Lane in London. He was named after the playwright Richard Brinsley Sheridan, who was a friend of his father. From 1809 to 1817 Peake was an apprentice with the engraver James Heath. On leaving Heath's employ in 1817 Peake began to write for the theatre; his first play was The Bridge that Carries Us Safe Over, produced at the English Opera House in 1817, and which was quickly followed by a farce, Wanted, a Governess.

== Writing career ==
For the next forty years Peake wrote burlesques, farces, comedies, melodramatic and musical romances, and an "operatic romance". His play The Meltonians was described as "a perfectly illegitimate drama and extravaganza." His 1823 play Presumption; or, the Fate of Frankenstein, was seen by Mary Shelley and her father William Godwin on 29 August 1823 at the English Opera House in the West End, shortly after her return to England. Shelley approved of the way the Creature, played by T. P. Cooke, was represented by a series of dashes in the advertising. To capitalise on the success of the play, Godwin arranged for his daughter's novel Frankenstein to be reprinted in two volumes with emendations by himself. In the play the character 'Fritz' was originated by Robert Keeley.

In about 1825 Peake married Susannah Snell, and they had at least six children together.

== Later years ==
From November 1839 and into the 1840s Peake wrote numerous articles for the periodicals; with a few exceptions all of his articles were published in Bentley's Miscellany. Peake wrote the accompanying text for the picture-book French Characteristic Costumes (1816); a comedic book of Cockney sports entitled Snobson's 'Seasons' (1838); Cartouche, the Celebrated French Robber (1844) in three-volumes; and a two-volume biography of a theatrical family, Memoirs of the Colman Family (1841). His comedy The Title Deeds, produced in June 1847 at the Adelphi Theatre, was probably his last play. From 1832 until his death Peake was the Treasurer at the Lyceum Theatre in London.

At his death in 1847 his family inherited his numerous debts, and were left in financial distress.

== Selected plays ==
- Presumption (1823)
- Comfortable Lodgings (1827)
- The Haunted Inn (1828)
- Court and City (1841)
- The Devil of Marseilles (1846)
- Gabrielli (1847)
- The Title Deeds (1847)
