= De Lisle (novel) =

1828 novel

- Author: Elizabeth Caroline Grey
- Language: English
- Genre: Silver Fork
- Publisher: Edward Bull
- Publication date: 1828
- Publication place: United Kingdom
- Media type: Print

De Lisle is an 1828 novel by the British writer Elizabeth Caroline Grey, originally published in three volumes. It is part of the then-fashionable genre of silver fork novels set among the British upper classes during the later Regency era. It revolves around the marriage of the protagonist Hubert De Lisle to Lady Rosamond Trevannon. Although a good and faithful wife, her increasingly neurotic husband becomes extremely suspicious of her.

== Bibliography ==
- Hudspeth, Robert N. The Letters of Margaret Fuller: 1850 and undated. Cornell University Press, 2018.
- Summers, Montague. A Gothic Bibliography. Dalcassian Publishing Company, 1940.
