= Sherman Converse =

American publisher (1790–1873)

Sherman Converse (April 17, 1790 – December 10, 1873) was an American publisher.

== Biography ==
Converse was born in Thompson, Connecticut on April 17, 1790. He graduated from Yale College in 1813. Soon after graduating he settled in New Haven, and became proprietor and editor of the Connecticut Journal, and the head of the largest publishing house in New England. He published, among other works, the Christian Spectator, Silliman's Journal, and Swift's Digest; and in 1828 Noah Webster's American Dictionary, the first quarto edition in two large volumes, from the original manuscript, and under the supervision of the author. This last was a work of great magnitude, requiring a heavy outlay of means and labor, and making a notable event in the history of the American press. Converse removed to the city of New York in 1828, and was for several years actively engaged in business of various kinds, both in this country and in Canada.

In about 1850, he became crippled by a severe attack of rheumatism, which made him an invalid for the rest of his life, and for ten years before his death he never left his room. Besides suffering from disease, he was sorely tried by grave financial embarrassments, but he bore all his trials with the patience and resignation of a true Christian. Since the spring of 1863, Converse resided with his son in Boston Highlands, Mass. He died, December 10, 1873, after an illness of three days.

He was married, in 1820, to Ann Huntington Perkins, daughter of Samuel Perkins, of Windham, Conn., who, with an infant child, died in the summer of 1821. In 1824, he married Eliza, daughter of the Rev. Samuel Nott, D.D., of Franklin, Connecticut. She died in 1845, leaving one son, a graduate of Yale, in 1850.

This article incorporates public domain material from the Yale Obituary Record.
