= Gotthilf August von Maltitz =

German writer

Gotthilf August Freiherr von Maltitz (July 9, 1794 – June 7, 1837) was a German writer.

Von Maltitz was born in Königsberg (then in the Kingdom of Prussia). He studied forestry in Tharandt, and became a forest overseer (Oberförsterstelle) in Prussia in 1821. However he left the position the next year because a satirical work of his offended his superiors.

He moved to Berlin, where he wrote satires and plays and became well known in high-society circles. His humorous works were probably most popular, including Ränzel und Wanderstab (1821) and Gelasius (1826). He also wrote some well-received dramas, including Schwur und Rache (1826) and Hans Kohlhaas (1828). Another 1828 play, however, Der alte Student, had a Polish protagonist and was judged to contain political agitation for Poland by the Prussian authorities, leading to his banishment from Berlin.

In 1828, he moved to the state of Hamburg, where he became editor of the journal Norddeutscher Courrier. In 1829, he wrote Das Pasquill, a dramatization of transparent versus concealed political culture, which "became quite popular in German theatres of the time." He went to Paris in 1830 following the July Revolution, but was soon disappointed and returned to the German states, where he lived in Dresden, Saxony until his death there in 1837. He published a collection of political poems as Pfefferkörner in four booklets from 1831 to 1834, and a collection of his satirical writings was published posthumously as Humoristische Raupen in 1839.
