= Mrs. Edward Knight =

American actress

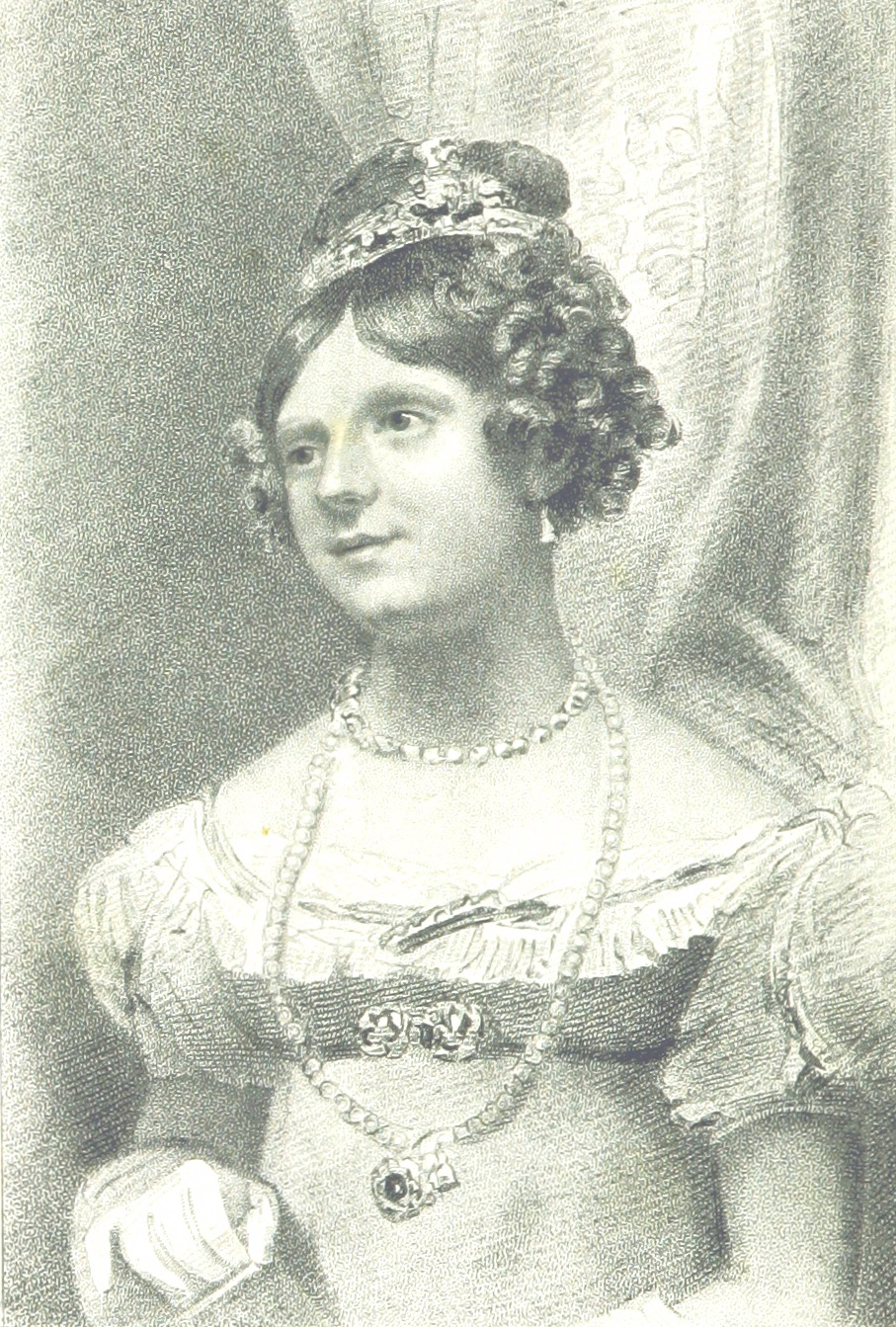
Miss Povey (later Mrs. Edward Knight)

Mrs. Edward Knight, née Mary Ann Povey (1804–1861) was an English-American singer and actress in comic opera.

== Biography ==
Mary Ann Povey was born in Birmingham, England. (Note: Sources variously give her birth date as 26 January or 26 July 1804) She was described as "especially good in comic opera", and as time went on she portrayed an increasing range of characters and became affiliated with the Park Theatre. At age 12 she became a student of Mr. Tom Cooke and made her stage debut as a singer at Drury Lane Theatre in 1817.

When she arrived in the United States in the 1820s, she "stood at the very summit of popular regard, and her songs were certainly given with a spirit and expressiveness at that time entirely unrivalled... As an actress in comic opera, she was superior to any contemporary star; and in later life, in a broader range of chambermaids, country girls and elderly spinsters, she acquired a deservedly high repute."

In 1826 at St Pancras New Church, Povey married Edward Knight, a musician and son of the actor Edward Knight. Their only child, a daughter, died in 1845. Four years later, she returned to England after becoming partially blind as a result of a disease caused by excessive weeping. Knight died in October 1861 at Brompton, England.
