= Frankenstein =

1818 novel by Mary Shelley

Frankenstein; or, The Modern Prometheus
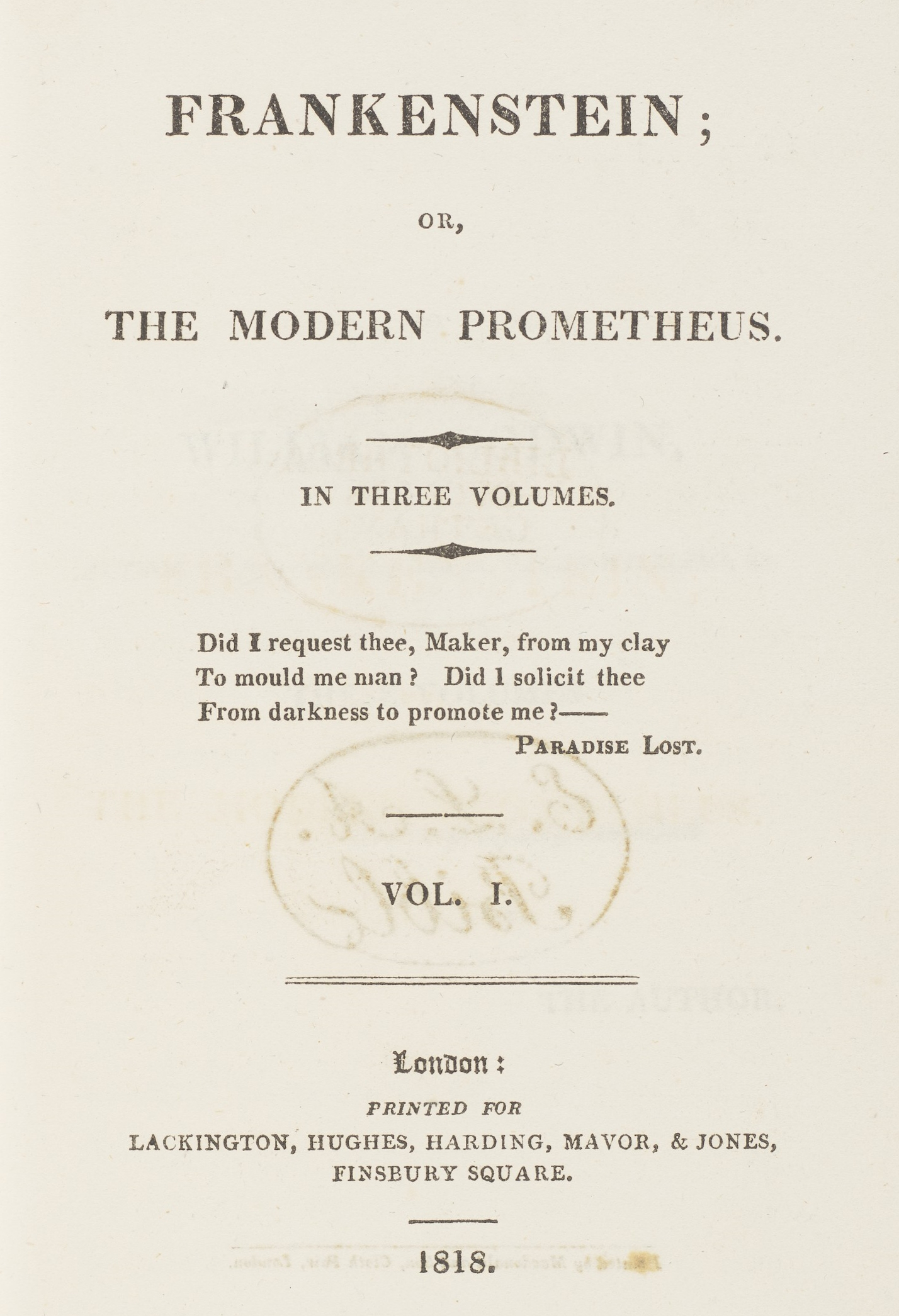
- Title page of Vol. I, first edition, 1818
- Author: Mary Shelley
- Language: English
- Genre: Gothic novel, science fiction
- Set in: England, Ireland, Italy, France, Scotland, Old Swiss Confederacy, Russian Empire, Holy Roman Empire, Arctic; late 18th century
- Published: 1 January 1818; 208 years ago
- Publisher: Lackington, Hughes, Harding, Mavor & Jones
- Publication place: United Kingdom
- Pages: 280
- Dewey Decimal: 823.7
- LC Class: PR5397 .F7
- Preceded by: History of a Six Weeks' Tour
- Followed by: Valperga
- Text: Frankenstein; or, The Modern Prometheus at Wikisource

Frankenstein; or, The Modern Prometheus is an 1818 Gothic novel (Note: This is the primary genre. The work is also known for its elements of science fiction and horror, which were often amplified in adaptations.) written by English author Mary Shelley. It tells the story of Victor Frankenstein, a young scientist who creates a sapient creature from different body parts in an unorthodox scientific experiment. Shelley started writing the story when she was 18 and staying in Bath, and the first edition was published anonymously in London on 1 January 1818, when she was 20. Her name first appeared in a French translation published in Paris in 1821.

Shelley travelled through Europe in 1815, moving along the river Rhine in Germany, and stopping in Gernsheim, 17 kilometres (11 mi) away from Frankenstein Castle, where, about a century earlier, Johann Konrad Dippel, an alchemist, had engaged in experiments. She then journeyed to the region of Geneva, Switzerland, where much of the story takes place. Galvanism and occult ideas were topics of conversation for her companions, particularly for her lover and future husband, Percy Bysshe Shelley.

In 1816—at the suggestion of Lord Byron—Mary, Percy, John Polidori and Byron himself, each agreed to try writing a ghost story. After thinking for days, Shelley was inspired to write Frankenstein after imagining a scientist who created life and was horrified by what he had made. The novel was first published anonymously in 1818, and in 1831, a revised edition was published under Mary Shelley's name. This version included significant stylistic revisions, a new preface describing the story's conception, and a more explicitly moral tone.

Frankenstein is one of the best-known works of English literature. Infused with elements of the Gothic novel and the Romantic movement, it has had a considerable influence on literature and on popular culture, spawning a complete genre of horror stories, films, and plays. Since the publication of the novel, the name Frankenstein has often been used, erroneously, to refer to the monster rather than the man who created it.

== Plot summary ==
Victor Frankenstein, born in late 18th-century Naples to an upper-class Genevese family, spends his youth obsessed with alchemy. As he grows older, he develops an interest in modern sciences such as chemistry and electricity. After his mother Caroline dies of scarlet fever, Victor leaves home to attend the University of Ingolstadt. Through his studies, Victor discovers a new way to create life, assembling human body parts stolen from charnel houses and fresh graves, which he uses to create a large and grotesque humanoid creature. When the creature awakens, Victor is repelled by it and flees in terror, returning the next day to find the creature gone.

The newly conscious creature runs away, discovers fire, and learns to avoid humans, who find him frightening. He finds a hovel attached to a small house, which lets him observe a family while remaining unseen. As the family teaches their language to a foreigner, the creature also learns to speak and write. He also finds a collection of books, including Paradise Lost, and learns to read. He reads some papers that had been in the clothes he had taken from Ingolstadt, through which he learns the truth of his origin and the identity of his creator. He finally reveals himself to the family's blind father while he is alone, who treats him with kindness. When the rest of the family returns, however, they are horrified by his appearance and chase him away. The creature then saves a young girl from drowning, only to be shot by her father, who had misunderstood, and thought the creature had attacked her.

Embittered by humanity, the creature travels to Geneva to confront his creator; upon arrival, he encounters Victor's younger brother, William. Realizing that William belongs to the same family, the creature kills him, then frames the family's servant Justine for his death. Victor suspects his creature was responsible, but does not intervene while Justine is tried and executed. Later, while hiking on Mer de Glace, Victor once more encounters the creature. The creature relays his story and asks Victor to create a female companion, which he believes will be his only chance at happiness. Victor consents to this.

"Oh, Frankenstein, be not equitable to every other, and trample upon me alone, to whom thy justice, and even thy clemency and affection, is most due. Remember, that I am thy creature; I ought to be thy Adam; but I am rather the fallen angel, whom thou drivest from joy for no misdeed. Everywhere I see bliss, from which I alone am irrevocably excluded. I was benevolent and good; misery made me a fiend. Make me happy, and I shall again be virtuous."

— The Creature asks Victor Frankenstein to create a female companion.

Victor and his friend Henry Clerval leave the European mainland for Britain, where Victor establishes a laboratory in Orkney. While working on the female creature, Victor imagines his creations giving birth, and fearfully decides to destroy the incomplete female. The original creature issues a warning that he will meet Victor on his wedding night, and murders Henry in an act of revenge.

Victor suffers a mental breakdown, then returns home. Back in Geneva, Victor marries Elizabeth Lavenza, a childhood friend (or cousin) born in Italy. Fulfilling his threat, the creature murders her on the wedding night. Days later, Victor's father Alphonse dies of grief. With only his brother Ernest left alive, Victor vows revenge and pursues the creature, eventually following him to the Arctic.

Chasing the creature across Arctic ice, Victor nearly dies from exhaustion and hypothermia, but is rescued by Captain Robert Walton, who is leading an expedition to the North Pole. Victor recounts his story to Walton and encourages the crew to continue their expedition; instead, they decide to abandon their journey and turn back. Victor vows that he will go on chasing the creature, but in his weakened state, he dies aboard the ship. As the ship leaves the Arctic, the creature comes on board. He mourns Victor's death, tells Walton he plans to burn himself on a pyre, and departs.

== Author's background ==
Mary Shelley by Richard Rothwell (1840–41)

Mary Shelley's mother, Mary Wollstonecraft, died from infection eleven days after giving birth to her. Shelley grew close to her father, William Godwin. Godwin hired a nurse, who briefly cared for her and her half-sister, before marrying his second wife, Mary Jane Clairmont, who did not like the close bond between Shelley and her father. The resulting friction caused Godwin to favour his other children.

Shelley's father was a famous author of the time, and her education was of great importance to him, although it was not formal. Shelley grew up surrounded by her father's friends, writers, and persons of political importance, who often gathered at the family home. This inspired her authorship at an early age. Mary, at the age of sixteen, met Percy Bysshe Shelley (who later became her husband) while he was visiting her father. Godwin disapproved of the relationship between his daughter and an older, married man, so they fled to France along with her stepsister, Claire Clairmont. On 22 February 1815, Shelley gave birth prematurely to her first child, Clara, who died two weeks later.

In the summer of 1816, Mary, Percy, and Claire took a trip to visit Claire's lover, Lord Byron, in Geneva. Poor weather conditions, more akin to winter, forced Byron and the visitors to stay indoors. Byron suggested that he, Mary, Percy, and Byron's physician, John Polidori, each try writing a ghost story. Mary was 20 years old when her novel Frankenstein was published.

== Literary influences ==
Shelley's work was heavily influenced by that of her parents. Her father was famous for his 1793 book Enquiry Concerning Political Justice and her mother was famous for the 1792 essay A Vindication of the Rights of Woman. Her father's novels also influenced her writing of Frankenstein. These novels included Things as They Are; or, The Adventures of Caleb Williams (1794), St. Leon, and Fleetwood. All of these books were set in Switzerland, similar to the setting in Frankenstein. Some major themes of social affections and the renewal of life that appear in Shelley's novel stem from these works she had in her possession. Other literary influences that appear in Frankenstein are Pygmalion et Galatée by Madame de Genlis, and Ovid, with the use of individuals identifying the problems with society. Ovid also inspires the use of Prometheus in the book's subtitle.

The influence of John Milton's Paradise Lost and Samuel Taylor Coleridge's The Rime of the Ancient Mariner are evident in the novel. In The Frankenstein of the French Revolution, author Julia Douthwaite posits that Shelley probably acquired some ideas for Frankenstein's character from Humphry Davy's book Elements of Chemical Philosophy, in which he had written that,

science has ... bestowed upon man powers which may be called creative; which have enabled him to change and modify the beings around him ...

References to the French Revolution run through the novel; a possible source is François-Félix Nogaret's Le Miroir des événemens actuels, ou la Belle au plus offrant (1790), a political parable about scientific progress featuring an inventor named "Wak-wik-vauk-an-son-frankésteïn", then abridged as Frankésteïn, who creates a life-sized automaton. However there is no evidence Shelley had read it.

Both Frankenstein and the monster quote passages from Percy Shelley's 1816 poem, "Mutability", and its theme of the role of the subconscious is discussed in prose. Percy Shelley's name never appears as the author of the poem, although the novel credits other quoted poets by name. Coleridge's poem The Rime of the Ancient Mariner (1798) is associated with the theme of guilt and William Wordsworth's "Tintern Abbey" (1798) with that of innocence.

Many writers and historians have attempted to associate several then-popular natural philosophers (now called physical scientists) with Shelley's work because of several notable similarities. Two of the most noted natural philosophers among Shelley's contemporaries were Italian Giovanni Aldini, who made many public attempts at human reanimation through bio-electric Galvanism in London, and Johann Konrad Dippel, who was supposed to have developed chemical means to extend the life span of humans. While Shelley was aware of both of these men and their activities, she makes no mention of or reference to them or their experiments in any of her published or released notes.

Ideas about life and death discussed by Percy and Byron were of great interest to scientists of the time. They drew on the theories of Erasmus Darwin and the experiments of Luigi Galvani, as well as the work of James Lind. Mary joined these conversations, and the ideas of Darwin, Galvani, and perhaps Lind are reflected in her novel.

Shelley's personal experiences also influenced the themes within Frankenstein. The themes of loss, guilt, and the consequences of defying nature present in the novel all developed from Mary Shelley's own life. The loss of her mother, the relationship with her father, and the death of her first child are thought to have inspired the monster and his separation from parental guidance. In a 1965 issue of The Journal of Religion and Health a psychologist proposed that the theme of guilt stemmed from her not feeling good enough for Percy because of the loss of their child.

Mary Shelley read The Empire of the Nairs (1811), James Henry Lawrence's utopian romance abolishing marriage and paternity, in late September 1814. David S. Neff has read Frankenstein as a reply to that utopia, its bachelor scientist a "Lawrentian motherson" whose flight from fatherhood destroys those around him, and has connected the novel's De Lacey family to Lawrence's character Lacy; the historian Anne Verjus, while confirming the 1814 reading, considers the influence unproven.

== Composition ==
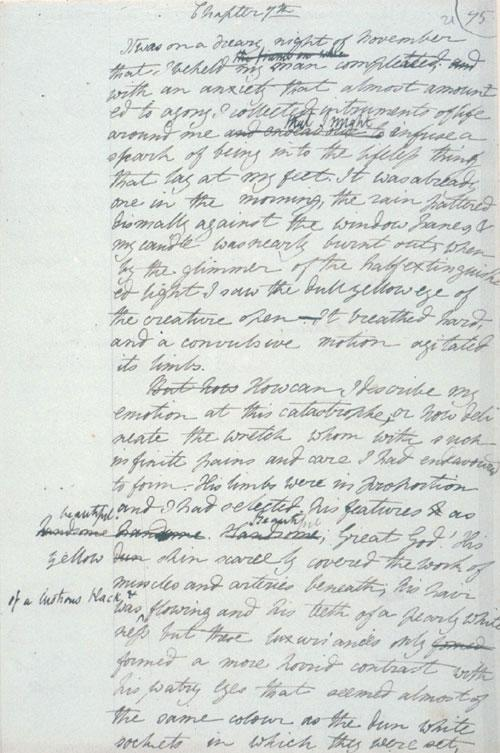
Draft of Frankenstein ("It was on a dreary night of November that I beheld my man completed ...")

During the rainy summer of 1816, the "Year Without a Summer", the world was locked in a long, cold volcanic winter caused by the eruption of Mount Tambora in 1815. Mary Shelley, aged 18, and her lover (and future husband), Percy Bysshe Shelley, visited Lord Byron at the Villa Diodati by Lake Geneva, in the Swiss Alps. The weather was too cold and dreary that summer to enjoy the outdoor holiday activities they had planned, so the group retired indoors until dawn.

Sitting around a log fire at Byron's villa, the company amused themselves by reading German ghost stories translated into French from the book Fantasmagoriana. Byron proposed that they "each write a ghost story." Unable to think of a story, Mary Shelley became anxious. She recalled being asked "Have you thought of a story?" each morning, and every time being "forced to reply with a mortifying negative." During one evening in the middle of summer, the discussions turned to the nature of the principle of life. "Perhaps a corpse would be re-animated," Mary noted, "galvanism had given token of such things". It was after midnight before they retired and, unable to sleep, she became possessed by her imagination as she beheld the "grim terrors" of her "waking dream".

I saw the pale student of unhallowed arts kneeling beside the thing he had put together. I saw the hideous phantasm of a man stretched out, and then, on the working of some powerful engine, show signs of life, and stir with an uneasy, half vital motion. Frightful must it be; for supremely frightful would be the effect of any human endeavour to mock the stupendous mechanism of the Creator of the world.

In 2011, astronomer Donald Olson, after a visit to the Lake Geneva villa in the previous year and inspecting data about the motion of the moon and stars, concluded that her "waking dream" took place between 2 a.m. and 3 a.m. on 16 June 1816, several days after the initial idea by Lord Byron that they each write a ghost story.

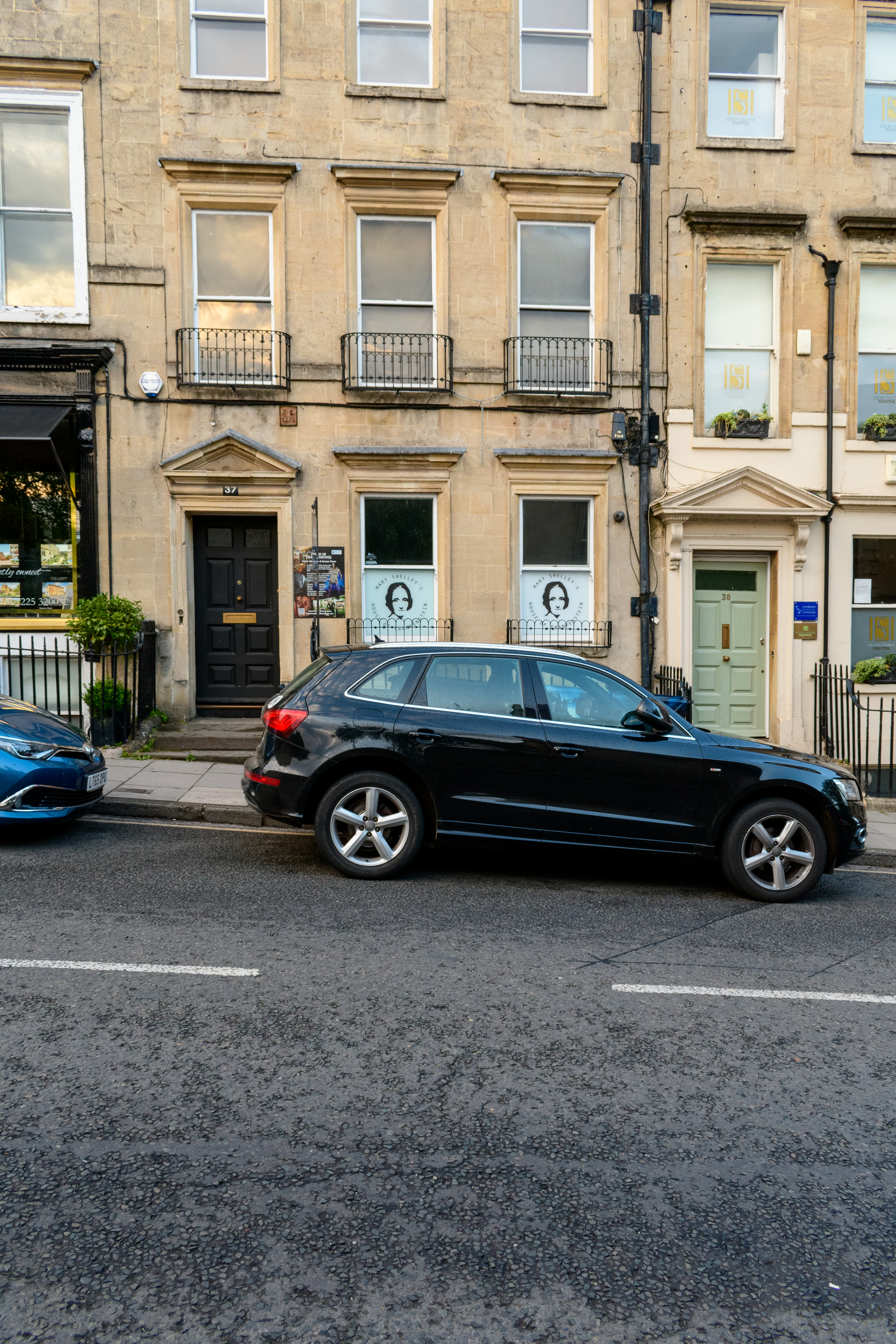
Mary Shelley's House of Frankenstein, a museum dedicated to the life of Shelley and her novel, at 37 Gay Street, Bath, the city where she wrote the book.

Mary Shelley began writing what she assumed would be a short story, but with Percy Shelley's encouragement, she expanded the tale into a fully-fledged novel. She later described that summer in Switzerland as the moment "when I first stepped out from childhood into life." Shelley wrote the first four chapters in the weeks following the suicide of her half-sister Fanny. This was one of many personal tragedies that impacted Shelley's work. Shelley's first child died in infancy, and when she began composing Frankenstein in 1816, she was probably nursing her second child, who was also dead by the time of Frankenstein's publication.

Shelley wrote much of the book while residing in a lodging house in the centre of Bath, England in 1816. According to Lorna Parkes in The Guardian:

By all accounts, Shelley came to Bath to hide. Yet she found deep wells of inspiration while living in the shadow of the city's gothic abbey, particularly among Bath's medical community. Significantly, she was a contemporary of Dr Charles Wilkinson, a pioneer of medical electricity, and attended lectures at his laboratory around the corner from her lodgings when she was writing about Victor Frankenstein breaking taboos by using galvanism to shock life into a creature stitched together from dead body parts.

Byron managed to write just a fragment based on the vampire legends he heard while travelling the Balkans, and from this John Polidori created The Vampyre (1819), the progenitor of the romantic vampire literary genre, thus two seminal horror tales originated from the conclave. The group talked about Enlightenment and Counter-Enlightenment ideas as well. Mary Shelley believed the Enlightenment idea that society could progress and grow if political leaders used their powers responsibly; however, she also believed the Romantic idea that misused power could destroy society.

Shelley's manuscripts for the first three-volume edition in 1818 (written 1816–1817), as well as the fair copy for her publisher, are now housed in the Bodleian Library in Oxford. The Bodleian acquired the papers in 2004, and they belong now to the Abinger Collection. In 2008, the Bodleian published a new edition of Frankenstein, edited by Charles E. Robinson, that contains comparisons of Mary Shelley's original text with Percy Shelley's additions and interventions alongside.

== Frankenstein and the Monster ==
=== The Creature ===
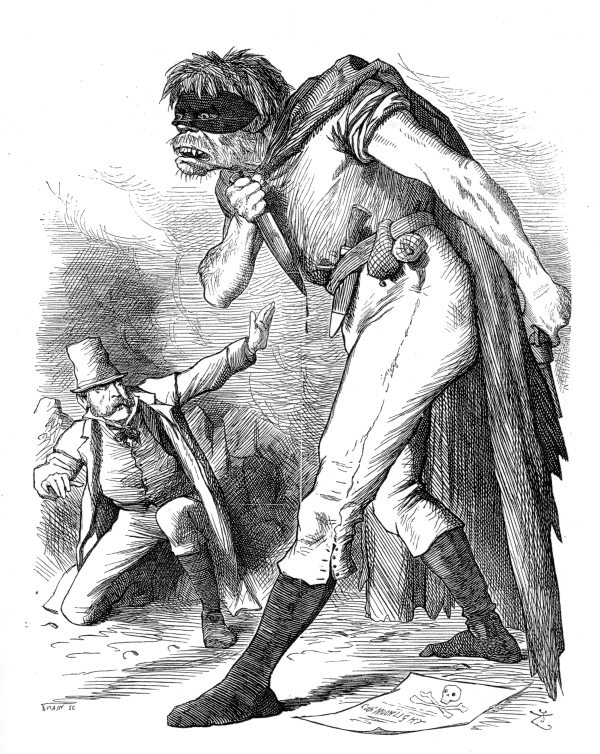
An English editorial cartoonist conceives the Irish Fenian movement as akin to Frankenstein's creature, in the wake of the Phoenix Park murders in an 1882 issue of Punch.

Although the Creature was described in later works as a composite of whole body parts grafted together from cadavers and reanimated by the use of electricity, this description is not consistent with Shelley's work; both the use of electricity and the cobbled-together image of Frankenstein's monster were more the result of James Whale's popular 1931 film adaptation of the story and other early motion-picture works based on the creature. The impact of James Whale's adaptation is noteworthy enough that in a 2025 publication of Frankenstein, the introduction by Jeanette Winterson erroneously references the use of a massive jolt of electricity to imbue life in the creature. In Shelley's original work, Victor Frankenstein discovers a previously unknown but elemental principle of life, and that insight allows him to develop a method to imbue vitality into inanimate matter, though the exact nature of the process is left ambiguous. After a great deal of hesitation in exercising this power, Frankenstein spends two years painstakingly constructing the Creature's body (one anatomical feature at a time, from raw materials supplied by "the dissecting room and the slaughter-house"), which he then brings to life using his unspecified process.

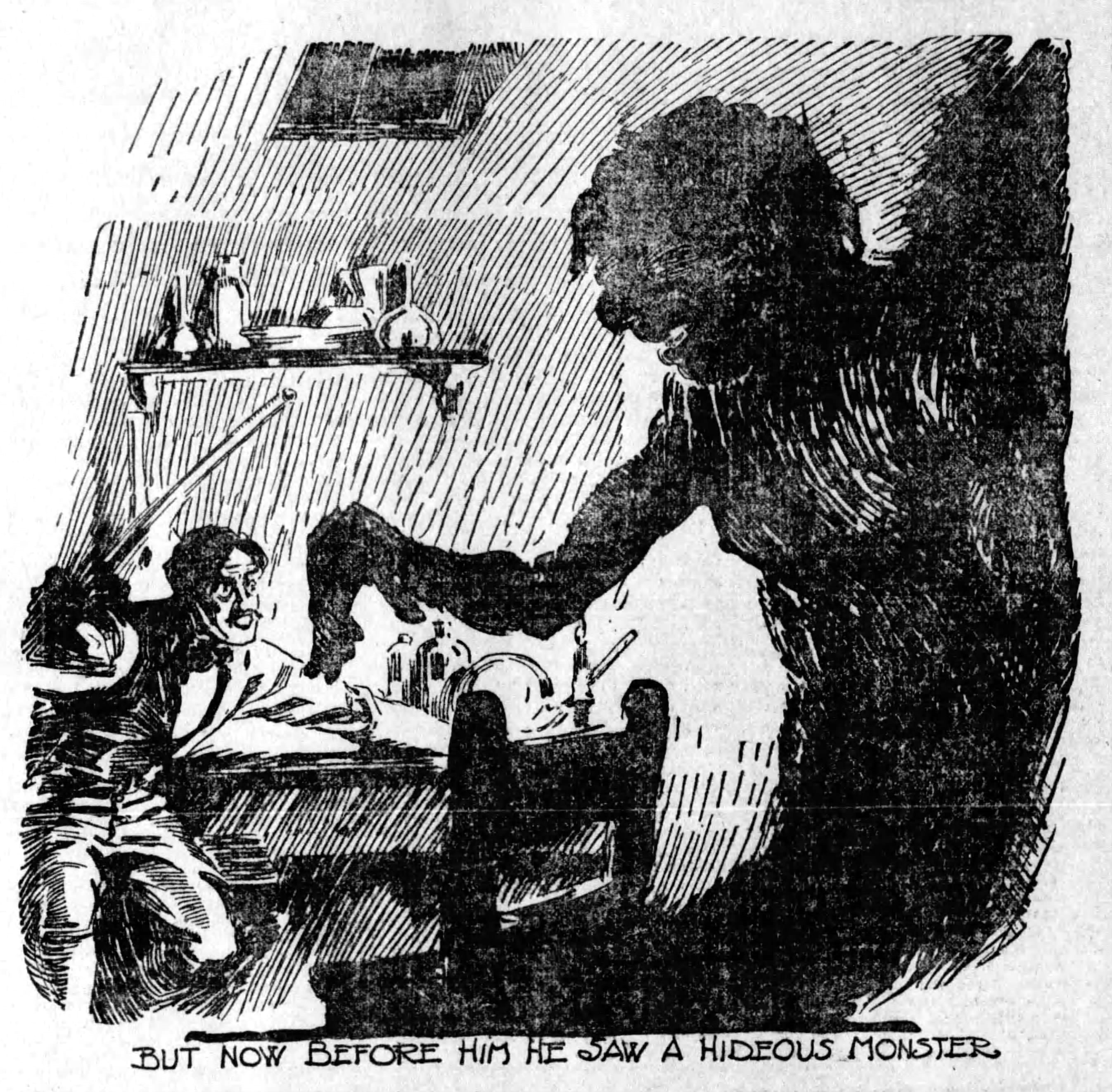
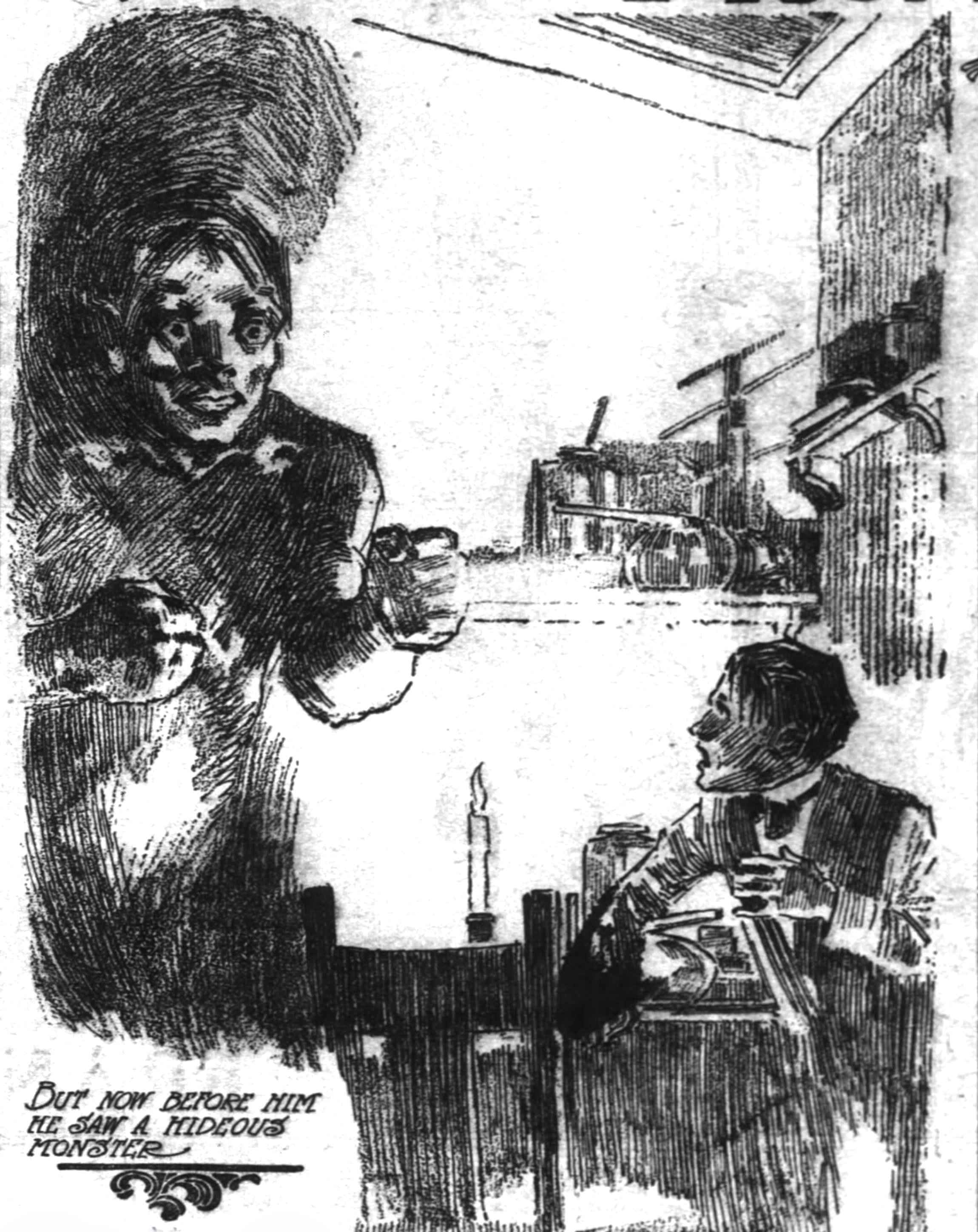
Newspaper illustrations from abridged versions of Frankenstein, 1910

Frankenstein does not give him a name. Instead, Frankenstein's creation is referred to by words such as "wretch", "monster", "creature", "demon", "devil", "fiend", and "it". When Frankenstein converses with the creature, he addresses him as "vile insect", "abhorred monster", "fiend", "wretched devil", and "abhorred devil".

In the novel, the creature is compared to Adam, the first man in the Garden of Eden. The monster also compares himself with the fallen angel. Speaking to Frankenstein, the monster says "I ought to be thy Adam, but I am rather the fallen angel". That angel would be Lucifer (meaning "light-bringer") in Milton's Paradise Lost, which the monster has read. Adam is also referred to in the epigraph of the 1818 edition:

Did I request thee, Maker, from my clay
To mould Me man? Did I solicit thee
From darkness to promote me?

Some have posited the creature as a composite of Percy Shelley and Thomas Paine. If the creature's hatred for Victor and his desire to raise a child mirror Percy's filial rebelliousness and his longing to adopt children, his desire to do good and his persecution can be said to echo Paine's utopian visions and fate in England.

The Creature has often been mistakenly called Frankenstein. In 1908, one author said "It is strange to note how well-nigh universally the term 'Frankenstein' is misused, even by intelligent people, as describing some hideous monster." Edith Wharton's The Reef (1916) describes an unruly child as an "infant Frankenstein". David Lindsay's "The Bridal Ornament", published in The Rover, 12 June 1844, mentioned "the maker of poor Frankenstein." After the release of Whale's cinematic Frankenstein, the public at large began speaking of the Creature itself as "Frankenstein". This misnomer continued with the successful sequel Bride of Frankenstein (1935), as well as in film titles such as Abbott and Costello Meet Frankenstein.

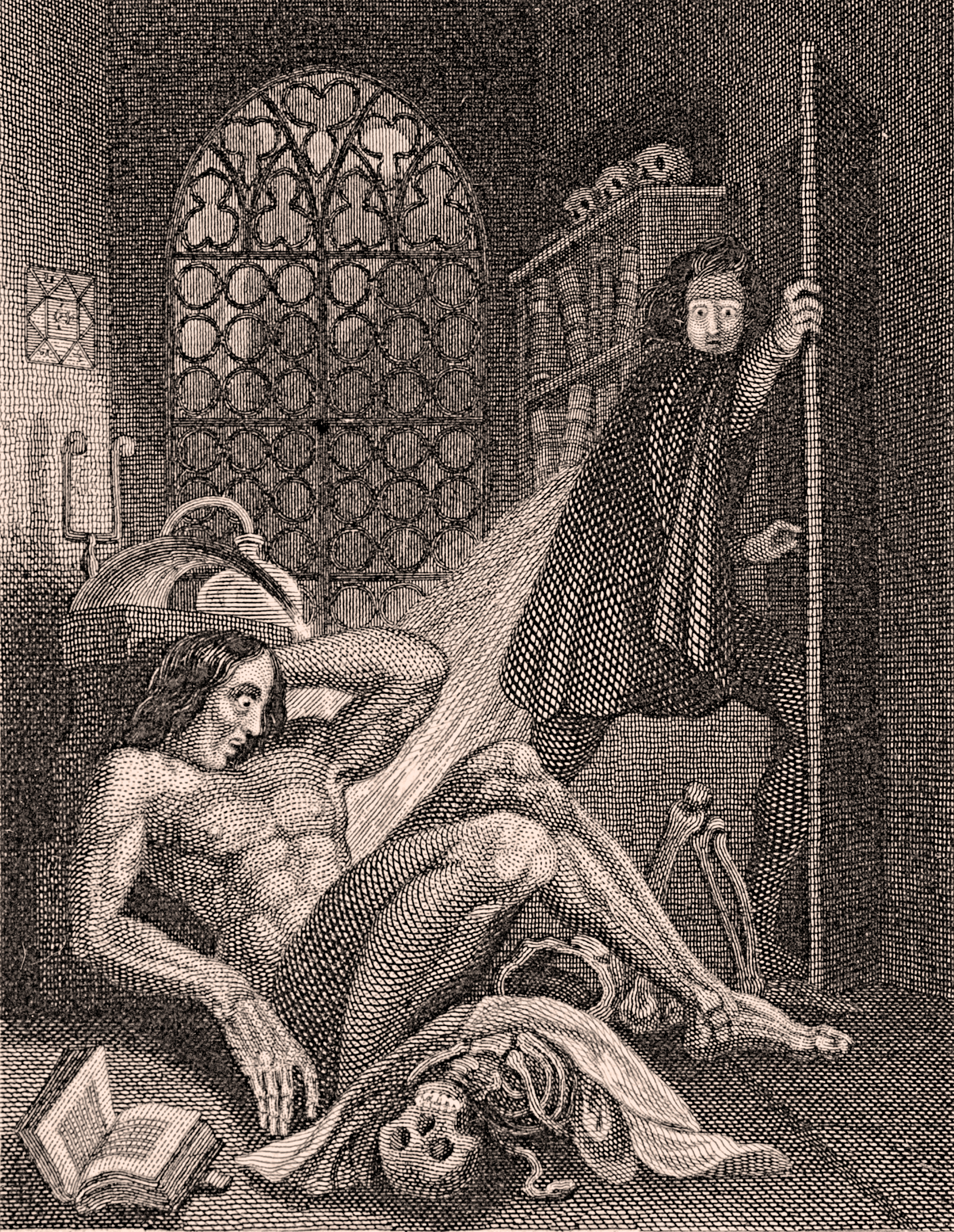
Illustration by Theodor von Holst from the frontispiece of the 1831 edition

=== Origin of Victor Frankenstein's name ===
Mary Shelley maintained that she derived the name Frankenstein from a dream-vision. This claim has since been disputed and debated by scholars that have suggested alternative sources for Shelley's inspiration. The German name Frankenstein means "stone of the Franks", and is associated with various places in Germany, including Frankenstein Castle (Burg Frankenstein) in Darmstadt, Hesse, and Frankenstein Castle in Frankenstein, a village in the Palatinate. There is also a castle called Frankenstein in Bad Salzungen, Thuringia, and a municipality called Frankenstein in Saxony. The town of Frankenstein in Silesia (now Ząbkowice, Poland) was the site of a scandal involving gravediggers in 1606, and this has been suggested as an inspiration to the author. Finally, the name is borne by the aristocratic House of Franckenstein from Franconia.

Radu Florescu argued that Mary and Percy Shelley visited Frankenstein Castle near Darmstadt in 1814, where alchemist Johann Konrad Dippel had experimented with human bodies, and reasoned that Mary suppressed mention of her visit to maintain her public claim of originality. A literary essay by A.J. Day supports Florescu's position that Mary Shelley knew of and visited Frankenstein Castle before writing her debut novel. Day includes details of an alleged description of the Frankenstein castle in Mary Shelley's "lost journals". However, according to Jörg Heléne, Day's and Florescu's claims cannot be verified.

A possible interpretation of the name "Victor" is derived from Paradise Lost by John Milton, a great influence on Shelley (a quotation from Paradise Lost is on the opening page of Frankenstein and Shelley writes that the monster reads it in the novel). Milton frequently refers to God as "the victor" in Paradise Lost, and Victor's creation of life in the novel is compared to God's creation of life in Paradise Lost. In addition, Shelley's portrayal of the monster owes much to the character of Satan in Paradise Lost, and the monster says in the story, after reading the epic poem, that he empathizes with Satan's role.

Parallels between Victor Frankenstein and Mary's husband, Percy Shelley, have also been drawn. Percy Shelley was the first-born son of Member of Parliament Timothy Shelley, a country squire with strong political connections, and grandson of Sir Bysshe Shelley, 1st Baronet of Castle Goring. Similarly, Victor's family is one of the most distinguished of that republic and his ancestors were counsellors and syndics. Percy's sister and Victor's adopted sister were both named Elizabeth. There are many other similarities, from Percy's usage of "Victor" as a pen name for Original Poetry by Victor and Cazire, a collection of poetry he wrote with Elizabeth, to Percy's days at Eton, where he had "experimented with electricity and magnetism as well as with gunpowder and numerous chemical reactions," and the way in which Percy's rooms at Oxford were filled with scientific equipment.

=== Modern Prometheus ===
The Modern Prometheus is the novel's subtitle (though modern editions now drop it, only mentioning it in introduction). Prometheus, in versions of Greek mythology, was the Titan who created humans in the image of the gods so that they could have a spirit breathed into them at the behest of Zeus. (Note: In the best-known versions of the Prometheus story, by Hesiod and Aeschylus, Prometheus merely brings fire to humankind, but in other versions, such as several of Aesop's fables (See in particular Fable 516), Sappho (Fragment 207), and Ovid's Metamorphoses, Prometheus is the actual creator of humanity.) Prometheus then taught humans to hunt, but after he tricked Zeus into accepting "poor-quality offerings" from humans, Zeus kept fire from humankind. Prometheus took back the fire from Zeus to give to humanity. When Zeus discovered this, he sentenced Prometheus to be eternally punished by fixing him to a rock of Caucasus, where each day an eagle pecked out his liver, only for the liver to regrow the next day because of his immortality as a god.

As a Pythagorean, or believer in An Essay on Abstinence from Animal Food, as a Moral Duty by Joseph Ritson, Mary Shelley saw Prometheus not as a hero but rather as something of a devil, and blamed him for bringing fire to humanity and thereby seducing the human race to the vice of eating meat. Percy wrote several essays on what became known as vegetarianism including A Vindication of Natural Diet.

Byron was particularly attached to the play Prometheus Bound by Aeschylus, and Percy Shelley soon wrote his own Prometheus Unbound (1820). The term "Modern Prometheus" was derived from Immanuel Kant, who described Benjamin Franklin as the "Prometheus of modern times" in reference to his experiments with electricity.

== Publication ==
Shelley completed her writing in April/May 1817, and Frankenstein; or, The Modern Prometheus was published on 1 January 1818 by the small London publishing house Lackington, Hughes, Harding, Mavor, & Jones. It was issued anonymously, with a preface written for Mary by Percy Bysshe Shelley and with a dedication to philosopher William Godwin, her father. It was published in an edition of just 500 copies in three volumes, the standard "triple-decker" format for 19th-century first editions.

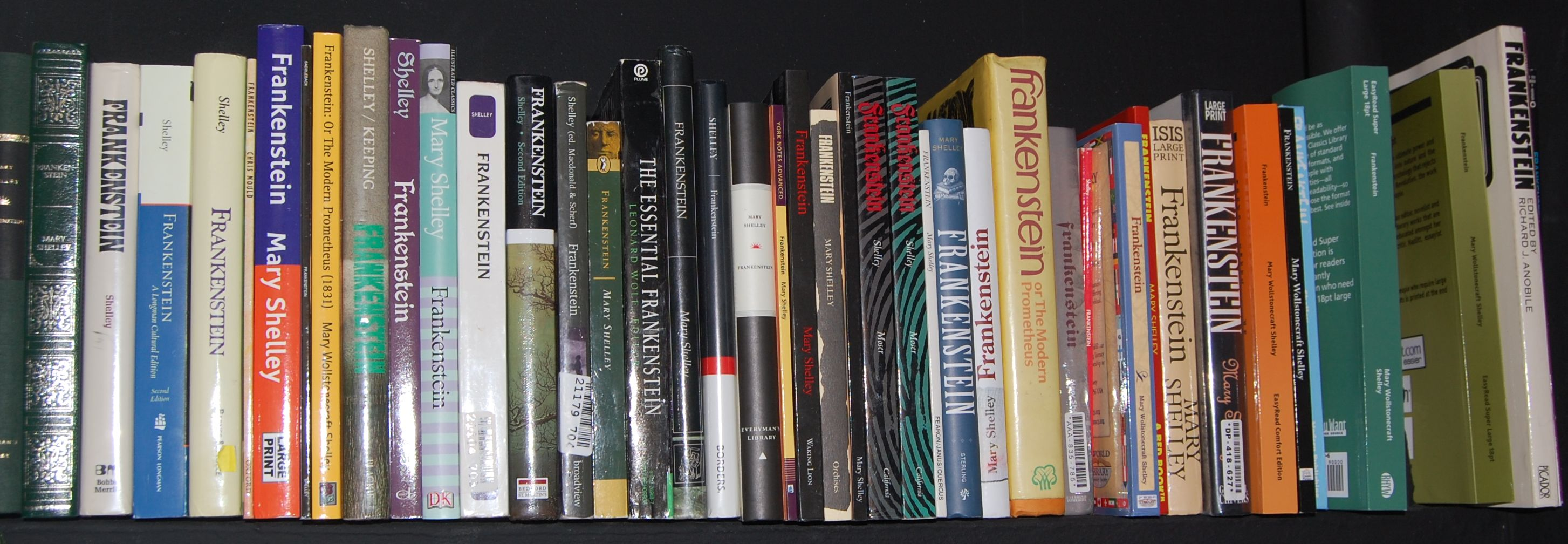
A variety of different editions

A French translation (Frankenstein: ou le Prométhée Moderne, translated by Jules Saladin) appeared as early as 1821. The second English edition of Frankenstein was published on 11 August 1823 in two volumes (by G. and W. B. Whittaker) following the success of the stage play Presumption; or, the Fate of Frankenstein by Richard Brinsley Peake. This edition credited Mary Shelley as the book's author on its title page.

On 31 October 1831, the first "popular" edition in one volume appeared, published by Henry Colburn & Richard Bentley. This edition was heavily revised by Mary Shelley, partially to make the story less radical. It included a lengthy new introduction by the author, presenting a somewhat embellished version of the genesis of the story. This edition is the one most widely published and read now, although a few editions follow the 1818 text. Some scholars such as Anne K. Mellor prefer the original version, arguing that it preserves the spirit of Mary Shelley's vision.

== Reception ==
Contemporary critical reviews were varied. Walter Scott, writing in Blackwood's Edinburgh Magazine, praised the novel as an "extraordinary tale, in which the author seems to us to disclose uncommon powers of poetic imagination," although he was less convinced about the way in which the monster gains knowledge about the world and language. La Belle Assemblée described the novel as "very bold fiction" and the Edinburgh Magazine and Literary Miscellany hoped to see "more productions ... from this author". On the other hand, John Wilson Croker, writing anonymously in the Quarterly Review, although conceding that "the author has powers, both of conception and language," described the book as "a tissue of horrible and disgusting absurdity."

The British Critic, a conservative and high-church journal, attacked the novel's flaws as the fault of the author:

The writer of it is, we understand, a female; this is an aggravation of that which is the prevailing fault of the novel; but if our authoress can forget the gentleness of her sex, it is no reason why we should; and we shall therefore dismiss the novel without further comment.

The Literary Panorama and National Register attacked the novel as a "feeble imitation of Mr. Godwin's novels" produced by the "daughter of a celebrated living novelist."

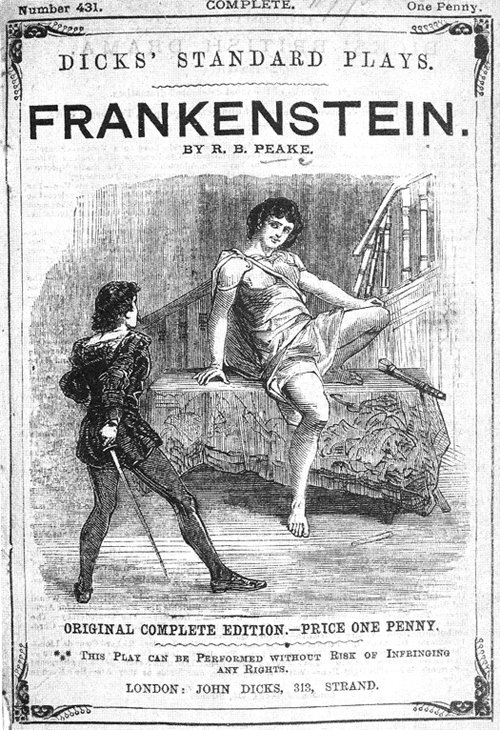
Cover of the 1823 West End stage play, Presumption; or, the Fate of Frankenstein, the first adaptation of the novel

Despite these reviews, Frankenstein achieved an almost immediate popular success. It became widely known, especially through melodramatic theatrical adaptations. The first adaptation, Presumption; or, the Fate of Frankenstein, a play by Richard Brinsley Peake, was performed thirty-seven times at the English Opera House in the West End during the 1823 season. The acclaim it received caused a second printing of Shelley's novel and other theatrical adaptations. Shelley attended a performance on 29 August 1823 and following the success of the play she wrote, "lo & behold! I found myself famous!".

Critical reception of Frankenstein has been largely positive since the mid-20th century. Major critics such as M. A. Goldberg and Harold Bloom have praised the "aesthetic and moral" relevance of the novel, although there have also been critics, such as Germaine Greer, who criticized the novel for technical and narrative defects: for example, she claimed that its three narrators all speak in the same way. In more recent years the novel has become a popular subject for psychoanalytic and feminist criticism: Lawrence Lipking states: "[E]ven the Lacanian subgroup of psychoanalytic criticism, for instance, has produced at least half a dozen discrete readings of the novel". Frankenstein has frequently been recommended on Five Books, with literary scholars, psychologists, novelists, and historians citing it as an influential text. Today, the novel is generally considered to be a landmark work as one of the greatest Romantic and Gothic novels, as well as one of the first science fiction novels.

Brian Aldiss has argued for regarding it as the first true science-fiction story. In contrast to previous stories with fantastical elements resembling those of later science fiction, Aldiss states, the central character "makes a deliberate decision" and "turns to modern experiments in the laboratory" to achieve fantastic results.

In 2018, film director Guillermo del Toro – who would later direct his own adaptation of the novel – described Frankenstein as "the quintessential teenage book", noting that the feelings that "You don't belong. You were brought to this world by people that don't care for you and you are thrown into a world of pain and suffering, and tears and hunger" are an important part of the story. He adds that "it's an amazing book written by a teenage girl. It's mind-blowing." Professor of philosophy Patricia MacCormack says that the Creature addresses the most fundamental human questions: "It's the idea of asking your maker what your purpose is. Why are we here, what can we do?"

On 5 November 2019, BBC News included Frankenstein in its list of the 100 most influential novels. In 2018, Jersey Post released series of 8 stamps celebrating the 200th anniversary of Frankenstein. In 2021 it was one of six classic science fiction novels by British authors selected by Royal Mail to be featured on a series of UK postage stamps.

== Films, plays, television and comic books ==
In 1910, Edison Studios released the first motion-picture adaptation of Shelley's story.

The 1931 film, with Boris Karloff playing the monster, is considered the most well-known portrayal of Frankenstein. The Hammer Horror films focused on the character of Dr Frankenstein (played by Peter Cushing in six films beginning with the 1957 film) rather than his monster.

In December 1945, the Gilberton Company issued a comic book version of Frankenstein as No. 26 in its long-running Classics Illustrated series, with illustrations by Robert Hayward Webb and Ann Brewster. The title went through nineteen printings between 1945 and 1971, and has been praised by comics historian Mike Benton as "probably the most faithful adaptation of the original novel -- movies included."

Manga artist and writer Junji Ito, best known for his horror work, published a comics adaptation of Frankenstein, which won an Eisner Award in 2019 for "Best Adaptation from Another Medium."

== See also ==
- Authorship of Frankenstein
- Frankenstein argument
- Frankenstein complex – Fear of mechanical men
- Frankenstein in Baghdad – 2013 novel by Ahmed Saadawi
- Frankenstein in popular culture
- Frankenstein's Promethean dimension
- Golem – Being in Jewish folklore made from clay
- Gothic (film)
- Gothic aspects in Frankenstein – Gothic aspects within Mary Shelley's Frankenstein
- Homunculus – Representation of a small human being, common in alchemy and fiction
- John Murray Spear – American Spiritualist minister (1804–1887)
- List of works based on dreams
- Plainpalais

== Sources ==
- Aldiss, Brian W. "On the Origin of Species: Mary Shelley". Speculations on Speculation: Theories of Science Fiction. Eds. James Gunn and Matthew Candelaria. Lanham, Maryland: Scarecrow, 2005.
- Baldick, Chris. In Frankenstein's Shadow: Myth, Monstrosity, and Nineteenth-Century Writing. Oxford: Oxford University Press, 1987.
- Bann, Stephen, ed. "Frankenstein": Creation and Monstrosity. London: Reaktion, 1994.
- Behrendt, Stephen C., ed. Approaches to Teaching Shelley's "Frankenstein". New York: MLA, 1990.
- Bennett, Betty T.; Stuart, Curran, eds. (2000). Mary Shelley in Her Times. Baltimore: Johns Hopkins University Press. ISBN 0801877334.
- Bennett, Betty T. (1998). Mary Wollstonecraft Shelley: An Introduction. Baltimore: Johns Hopkins University Press. ISBN 080185976X.
- Bohls, Elizabeth A. "Standards of Taste, Discourses of 'Race', and the Aesthetic Education of a Monster: Critique of Empire in Frankenstein". Eighteenth-Century Life 18.3 (1994): 23–36.
- Botting, Fred. Making Monstrous: "Frankenstein", Criticism, Theory. New York: St. Martin's, 1991.
- Chapman, D. That Not Impossible She: A study of gender construction and Individualism in Mary Shelley's Frankenstein, UK: Concept, 2011. ISBN 978-1480047617
- Clery, E. J. Women's Gothic: From Clara Reeve to Mary Shelley. Plymouth: Northcote House, 2000.
- Conger, Syndy M., Frederick S. Frank, and Gregory O'Dea, eds. Iconoclastic Departures: Mary Shelley after "Frankenstein": Essays in Honor of the Bicentenary of Mary Shelley's Birth. Madison, New Jersey: Fairleigh Dickinson University Press, 1997.
- Donawerth, Jane. Frankenstein's Daughters: Women Writing Science Fiction. Syracuse: Syracuse University Press, 1997.
- Douthwaite, Julia V. "The Frankenstein of the French Revolution," chapter two of The Frankenstein of 1790 and other Lost Chapters from Revolutionary France Archived 16 November 2012 at the Wayback Machine. Chicago: University of Chicago Press, 2012.
- Dunn, Richard J. "Narrative Distance in Frankenstein". Studies in the Novel 6 (1974): 408–17.
- Eberle-Sinatra, Michael, ed. Mary Shelley's Fictions: From "Frankenstein" to "Falkner". New York: St. Martin's Press, 2000.
- Ellis, Kate Ferguson. The Contested Castle: Gothic Novels and the Subversion of Domestic Ideology. Urbana: University of Illinois Press, 1989.
- Florescu, Radu (1996). In Search of Frankenstein: Exploring the Myths Behind Mary Shelley's Monster (2nd ed.). London: Robson Books. ISBN 978-1-861-05033-5.
- Forry, Steven Earl. Hideous Progenies: Dramatizations of "Frankenstein" from Mary Shelley to the Present. Philadelphia: University of Pennsylvania Press, 1990.
- Freedman, Carl. "Hail Mary: On the Author of Frankenstein and the Origins of Science Fiction". Science Fiction Studies 29.2 (2002): 253–64.
- Gigante, Denise. "Facing the Ugly: The Case of Frankenstein". ELH 67.2 (2000): 565–87.
- Gilbert, Sandra and Susan Gubar. The Madwoman in the Attic: The Woman Writer and the Nineteenth-Century Literary Imagination. New Haven: Yale University Press, 1979.
- Hay, Daisy "Young Romantics" (2010): 103.
- Heffernan, James A. W. "Looking at the Monster: Frankenstein and Film". Critical Inquiry 24.1 (1997): 133–58.
- Hodges, Devon. "Frankenstein and the Feminine Subversion of the Novel". Tulsa Studies in Women's Literature 2.2 (1983): 155–64.
- Hoeveler, Diane Long. Gothic Feminism: The Professionalization of Gender from Charlotte Smith to the Brontës. University Park: Pennsylvania State University Press, 1998.
- Holmes, Richard. Shelley: The Pursuit. 1974. London: Harper Perennial, 2003. ISBN 0-00-720458-2.
- Jones, Frederick L. (1952). "Shelley and Milton". Studies in Philology. 49 (3): 488–519. JSTOR 4173024.
- Knoepflmacher, U. C. and George Levine, eds. The Endurance of "Frankenstein": Essays on Mary Shelley's Novel. Berkeley: University of California Press, 1979.
- Lew, Joseph W. "The Deceptive Other: Mary Shelley's Critique of Orientalism in Frankenstein". Studies in Romanticism 30.2 (1991): 255–83.
- London, Bette. "Mary Shelley, Frankenstein, and the Spectacle of Masculinity". PMLA 108.2 (1993): 256–67.
- Mellor, Anne K. Mary Shelley: Her Life, Her Fiction, Her Monsters. New York: Methuen, 1988.
- Michaud, Nicolas, Frankenstein and Philosophy: The Shocking Truth, Chicago: Open Court, 2013.
- Miles, Robert. Gothic Writing 1750–1820: A Genealogy. London: Routledge, 1993.
- Milner, Andrew. Literature, Culture and Society. London: Routledge, 2005, ch.5.
- O'Flinn, Paul. "Production and Reproduction: The Case of Frankenstein". Literature and History 9.2 (1983): 194–213.
- Poovey, Mary. The Proper Lady and the Woman Writer: Ideology as Style in the Works of Mary Wollstonecraft, Mary Shelley, and Jane Austen. Chicago: University of Chicago Press, 1984.
- Rauch, Alan. "The Monstrous Body of Knowledge in Mary Shelley's Frankenstein". Studies in Romanticism 34.2 (1995): 227–53.
- Selbanev, Xtopher. "Natural Philosophy of the Soul", Western Press, 1999.
- Schor, Esther, ed. The Cambridge Companion to Mary Shelley. Cambridge: Cambridge University Press, 2003.
- Scott, Grant F. (April–June 2012). "Victor's Secret: Queer Gothic in Lynd Ward's Illustrations to Frankenstein (1934)". Word & Image. 28 (2): 206–32. doi:10.1080/02666286.2012.687545. S2CID 154238300.
- Smith, Johanna M., ed. Frankenstein. Case Studies in Contemporary Criticism. Boston: Bedford/St. Martin's, 1992.
- Spark, Muriel. Mary Shelley. London: Cardinal, 1987. ISBN 0-7474-0318-X.
- Stableford, Brian. "Frankenstein and the Origins of Science Fiction". Anticipations: Essays on Early Science Fiction and Its Precursors. Ed. David Seed. Syracuse: Syracuse University Press, 1995.
- Sunstein, Emily W. (1989). Mary Shelley: Romance and Reality (1991 ed.). Baltimore: Johns Hopkins University Press. ISBN 0801842182.
- Tropp, Martin. Mary Shelley's Monster. Boston: Houghton Mifflin, 1976.
- Veeder, William. Mary Shelley & Frankenstein: The Fate of Androgyny. Chicago: University of Chicago Press, 1986.
- Williams, Anne. The Art of Darkness: A Poetics of Gothic. Chicago: University of Chicago Press, 1995.
