= Larry Talbot =

Universal Monsters franchise character

- The Wolf Man character
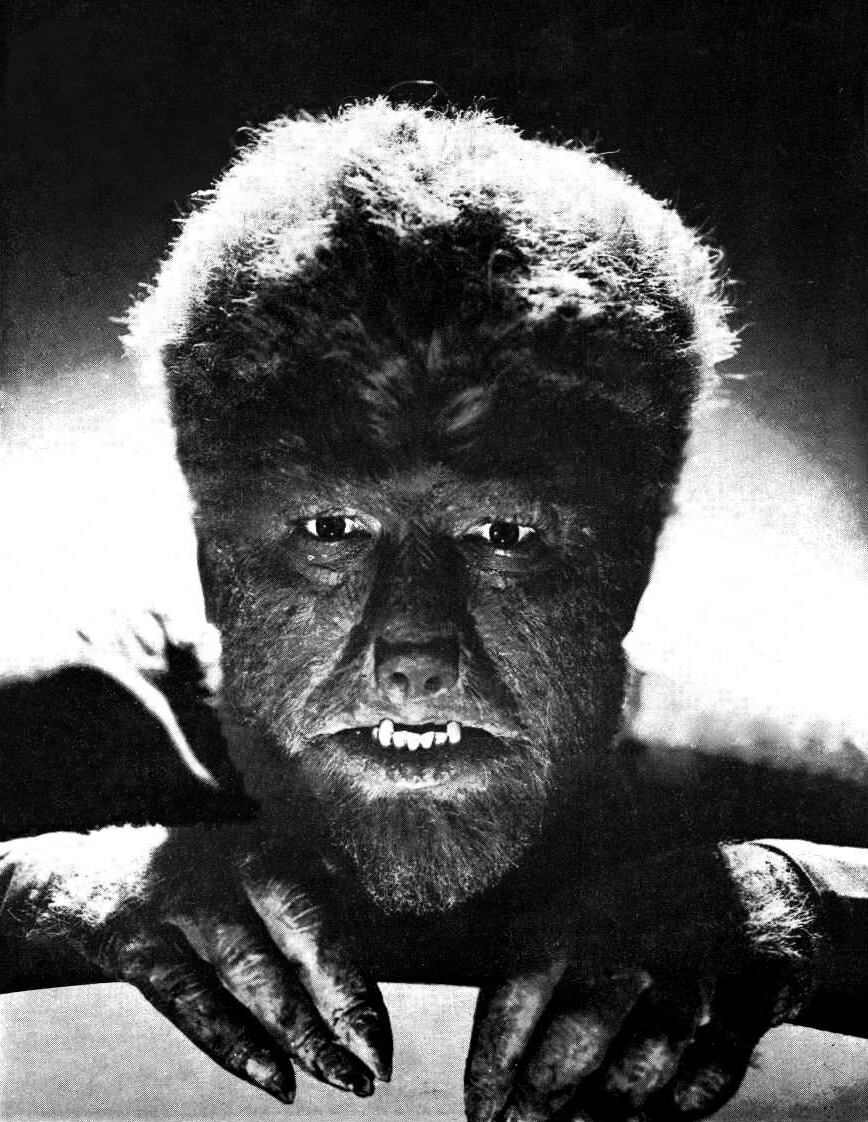
- Publicity photo of Lon Chaney Jr. in full make-up as the Wolf Man.
- Portrayed by: Lon Chaney Jr. (1941–48); Donald Gibb (1985); Flavio Bucci (1986); Jon Gries (1987); Carl Thibault (1987); Matt Birman (1989); Will Kemp (2004); Benicio del Toro (2010); Mario Marin-Borquez (young; 2010); Josh Hartnett (2014–2016); Christopher Abbott (2025); Zac Chandler (young; 2025)

In-universe information
- Full name: Lawrence Stewart Talbot
- Aliases: The Wolf Man; Mr. Talbot; Velkan Valerious; Ethan Chandler; Mr. Taylor; Lonnie Tallbutt; The Prodigal Son; The Desperate Guy
- Species: Werewolf; Human (formerly)
- Gender: Male
- Occupation: Aristocrat; Actor; Astronomer; Serial killer Cavalry soldier
- Nationality: Welsh; American (naturalized)

Lawrence Stewart Talbot, also known as the Wolf Man, is the main character in the 1941 Universal film The Wolf Man and its sequels, created by Curt Siodmak. The Wolf Man is portrayed by Lon Chaney Jr. in the 1941 film and by Benicio del Toro in the 2010 film. A rebooted version of the character named Blake Lovell is portrayed by Christopher Abbott in the 2025 film. The Wolf Man is part of the Universal Monsters ensemble.

== Biography ==
=== The Wolf Man (1941) ===
Larry Talbot returns to his ancestral home in Llanwelly, Wales, to reconcile with his father, Sir John Talbot. He had left for America eighteen years earlier, when his elder brother (also named John) was made heir to the estate, but he has returned following his brother's death in a hunting accident. While there, Larry becomes romantically interested in a local girl named Gwen Conliffe, who runs an antique shop. As a pretext, he buys a silver-headed walking stick decorated with a wolf. Gwen tells him that it represents a werewolf (which she defines as a man who changes into a wolf "at certain times of the year").

That night, Larry attempts to rescue Gwen's friend Jenny from what he believes to be an attack by a wolf. He kills the beast with his new walking stick, but is bitten in the process. A gypsy named Maleva later reveals to Larry that the animal which bit him was actually her son Bela in the form of a wolf. Bela had been a werewolf for years and now the curse of lycanthropy has been passed to Larry.

Larry transforms into a werewolf every night, in one instance murdering a villager. He has no memories of his time spent in werewolf form, but gradually comes to believe Maleva's story after she uses a spell to turn him back into his human form after he got caught in a bear trap.

After a panicked attempt to leave town, he transforms into a werewolf and is bludgeoned to death by his father, who does not recognize him, with his own walking stick. As he dies, Maleva casts a spell which returns him to human form. When the hunters arrive and see Larry dead, they assume that Larry died killing the werewolf.

=== Frankenstein Meets the Wolf Man (1943) ===
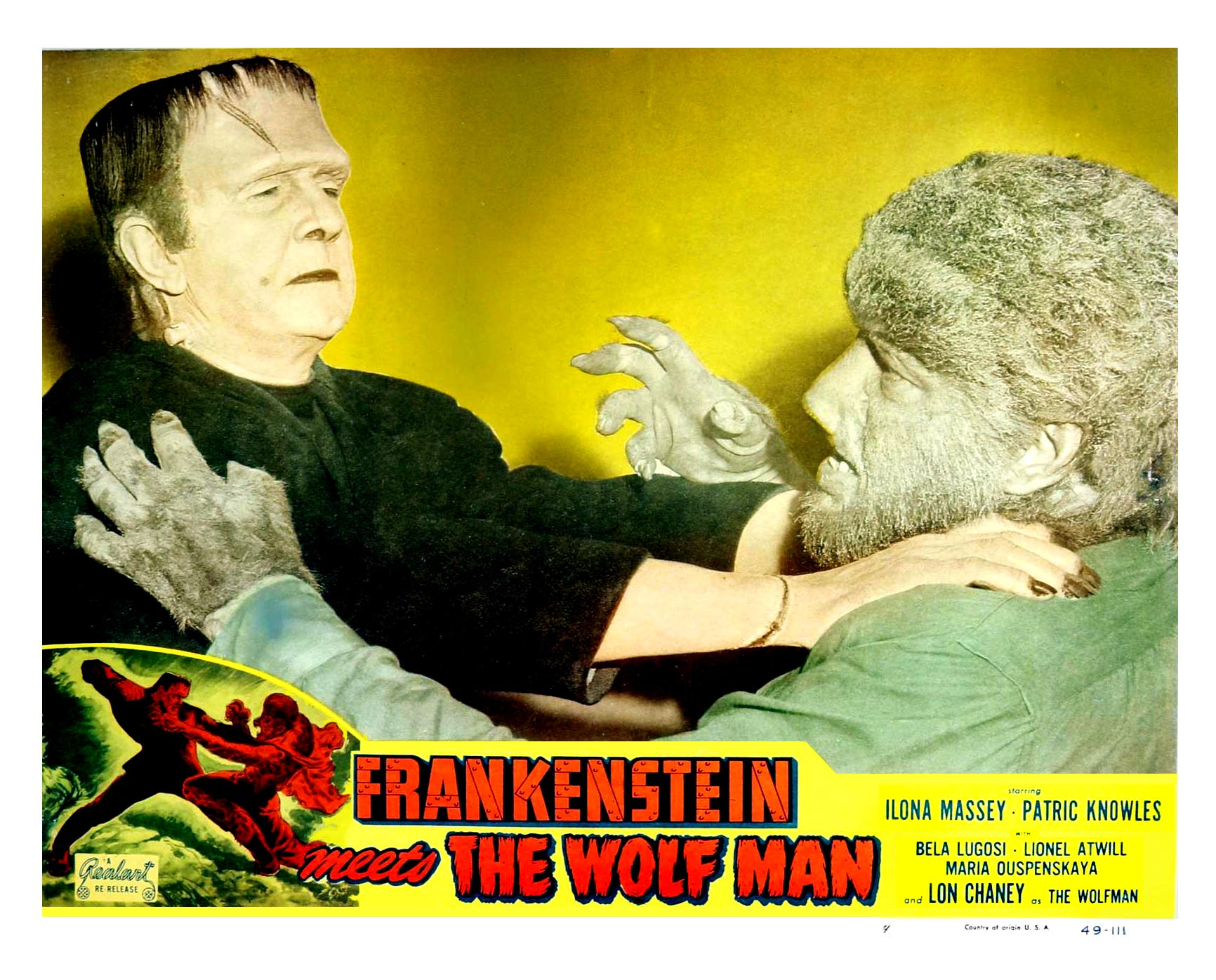
Re-release lobby card for Frankenstein Meets the Wolf Man with Bela Lugosi and Lon Chaney Jr.

This film makes significant changes to the nature of Larry Talbot's werewolf curse. He now changes into Wolf Man form only during a full moon, rather than every night during the werewolf season as in the original film. He also now remembers all of his doings as the Wolf Man. The film reveals that the official story for his death is that the Talbot house was invaded by a wolf, and while trying to fight it off, John Talbot struck his son instead by mistake.

Four years later, Larry is awakened from death when grave robbers open his tomb under a full moon and remove the wolfsbane he was buried with. Once he realizes what happened, he is dismayed. Larry regards the attack by his father as his rightful death, and immortality an affliction. Seeking a cure for his apparent inability to die, he searches for Maleva. Maleva tells him Dr. Henry Frankenstein could know how to remove his life force. They set out on a journey to the Frankenstein family's castle, where he hopes to find the notes of Dr. Henry Frankenstein. A month elapses during his search for Maleva and journey to meet Dr. Frankenstein, bringing another full moon. During his transformation into a werewolf, he falls into the castle's frozen catacombs and revives Frankenstein's monster. Finding that the monster is unable to locate the notes of the recently deceased doctor, Larry seeks out Ludwig Frankenstein's daughter Baroness Elsa Frankenstein, hoping she knows their hiding place. Frankenstein's monster crashes the village festival. Elsa gives the notes to Larry and Dr. Mannering, who has tracked Larry across Europe, so that they may be used to drain all life from both Larry and the monster. However, Dr. Mannering's desire to see Frankenstein's monster at full strength leads him to instead transfer Larry's life to the monster. Elsa attempts to stop this procedure. As a result, Larry's life is not fully transferred. The procedure takes place on the night of a full moon and Larry is transformed just as Frankenstein's monster regains his strength. After Frankenstein's monster carries off Elsa, the Wolf Man attacks him and the two title characters are swept away by a flood that results when the local tavern owner blows up the town dam to drown the castle's inhabitants.

=== House of Frankenstein (1944) ===
The film focuses on the exploits of the vengeful Dr. Gustav Niemann (Boris Karloff) who escapes from prison. He is helped by the hunchback Daniel (J. Carroll Naish), for whom he promises to create a new, beautiful body. The two murder a traveling showman and take over his horror exhibit. To exact revenge on Hussmann, who had once caused his imprisonment, Niemann revives Count Dracula. Dracula seduces Hussmann's granddaughter-in-law and kills Hussmann himself, but in a subsequent chase, Niemann disposes of Dracula's coffin, causing the vampire to perish in sunlight. Niemann and Daniel move on to the flooded ruins of Castle Frankenstein where they find the bodies of Frankenstein' monster and the Wolf Man (Lawrence Talbot), preserved in the frozen waters. Nieman thaws out the two and promises Talbot to find a cure from the curse. However, in fact he is more interested in reviving Frankenstein's monster and exacting revenge on two former associates than in his promises to Daniel or Talbot. Talbot transforms into a werewolf and kills a man, arousing the villagers.

Talbot is also envied by the hunchback Daniel as both love Ilonka, a gypsy girl. She has fallen in love with Talbot, but is the object of Daniel's affection. Daniel reveals Talbot's curse to Ilonka, but she is not deterred and promises to help him in fighting the curse.

Things enter a critical stage at night as Niemann revives Frankenstein's monster and Talbot again turns into a werewolf. Talbot is shot by Ilonka with a silver bullet, thereby releasing him from the curse.

=== House of Dracula (1945) ===
Even though both Dracula and Larry Talbot perished in the previous film, they are depicted as still alive in this entry and seeking a cure for their respective afflictions from a brilliant scientist named Dr. Franz Edelmann. Frankenstein's monster plays a minor role in this film, only being found when Talbot tries to drown himself. In the end, Talbot is finally cured of his affliction and falls in love with Edelmann's assistant Miliza Morrelle (Martha O'Driscoll). He then kills Edelman who has been contaminated with Dracula's blood and earlier requested Talbot to end his life if he proved unable to do so himself.

=== Abbott and Costello Meet Frankenstein (1948) ===
The comedy horror film Abbott and Costello Meet Frankenstein is the final appearance of the character in the original Universal Monsters cycle.

Chick Young (Bud Abbott) and Wilbur Grey (Lou Costello) work as railway baggage-clerks who deliver two crates to McDougal's House of Horrors museum. The crates contain "the remains of the original Count Dracula" (Bela Lugosi) and "the body of the Frankenstein Monster" (Glenn Strange). The monsters revive and go to the castle of Dr. Sandra Mornay, who has studied Dr. Frankenstein's notebooks, and is part of Dracula's scheme to replace the Monster's brain with Wilbur's. Joan Raymond (Jane Randolph) is secretly working for the insurance company that is processing McDougal's claim regarding the missing contents of the crates and hopes Wilbur will lead her to the missing 'exhibits'.

Larry Talbot (Lon Chaney Jr.) has tracked Dracula and the Monster to the area and asks Chick and Wilbur to help him destroy them. That night the moon is full, and Talbot insists that he be locked in his room. The following night, at Sandra's castle, Wilbur encounters Dracula and the Monster, but escapes. Later, Sandra admits to Dracula that she has put the experiment on hold. Dracula bites her in the throat. Talbot and McDougal arrive unexpectedly, but Dracula deflects Talbot's accusations, making Talbot appear disturbed. While Dracula is with Joan, Talbot transforms into the Wolfman and injures McDougal. Under the spell of Dracula, Sandra is about to carry out the brain transplant when Talbot and Chick storm in. Just as Talbot is about to untie Wilbur, he once again transforms into the Wolf Man. Dracula flees, with the Wolf Man giving chase just as the Monster breaks his restraints and throws Sandra out the window. Dracula transforms into a bat, but the Wolf Man grabs him and both fall over a balcony into the rocky seas below. The boys head to a rowboat with the Monster in pursuit. Wilbur unties the boat, while Joan sets the pier on fire. The Monster turns around and marches into the flames, succumbing as the pier collapses into the water.

=== Van Helsing (2004) ===
In the 2004 film Van Helsing starring Hugh Jackman, Lawrence Talbot is reimagined as a new character named Velkan Valerious (portrayed by Will Kemp). Velkan gets bitten by a werewolf and is then dubbed the Wolfman. Unlike the previous films, a werewolf will rip out of its human skin rather than transform.

=== The Wolfman (2010) ===
A Wolfman costume, worn by Benicio Del Toro in The Wolfman (2010), made by Rick Baker and Dave Elsey, who won the Academy Award for Best Makeup for their work on the film.

In the 2010 remake of the film, Lawrence Talbot is played by Puerto Rican actor Benicio del Toro, who was "cast for his resemblance to Lon Chaney Jr., with his clouded, thick features and his air of suffering." Lawrence is depicted as an "Anglo-Indian, which explains his complexion, and the film notes that he was educated in America, to explain his accent." His ancestral home is also shown to be in Blackmoor, England. Mario Marin-Borquez portrays him as a child.

Having been sent to America as a child by his father Sir John Talbot (Anthony Hopkins) to live with his aunt following a year in an asylum after his mother's apparent suicide, Talbot goes on to become an actor. His brother Ben's fiancé Gwen Conliffe (Emily Blunt) asks him to return to the family home to help find his missing brother. To his horror, he learns that Ben's brutally mutilated body was discovered shortly before his arrival. Attempting to investigate his brother's death, Lawrence is attacked and bitten by a werewolf after going to meet a Gypsy named Maleva. After having his wounds stitched up and being taken back to Talbot Hall, Lawrence goes through an unnaturally fast recovery leading up to the night of the full moon. The night of the full moon arrives and Lawrence finds his father creeping around Talbot Hall and follows him through the estate to his mother's burial crypt. Following a brief exchange, the full moon shines and Lawrence painfully transforms into a werewolf and begins his reign of terror among Blackmoor, brutally killing several villagers. The next morning Lawrence is woken by his father inside an old hollowed tree in front of the Talbots' estate, shortly after which Lawrence is arrested by Francis Aberline (Hugo Weaving) of Scotland Yard, with the help of several villagers; he is subsequently taken back to the asylum where he was sent as a child. During his time at the asylum, it is revealed that his father, Sir John Talbot, was the werewolf who bit him, with his mother's "suicide" actually being the result of Sir John attacking her in werewolf form; Lawrence's traumatized mind simply repressed the memory during his time at the asylum.

On the next night of the full moon, Lawrence is strapped to a chair and is being psychologically treated in front of an on-looking crowd at the asylum, the doctor convinced that others seeing Lawrence remain human when exposed to the full moon will help him realize that his belief that he is a werewolf is wrong. In the middle of the demonstration, Lawrence warns them that they are all in great danger, but they laugh off his warning and continue. Seconds later, the full moon shines through the asylum window and Lawrence transforms into a werewolf, who brutally murders the doctor and several spectators before escaping. Lawrence tears his way through London with Aberline in pursuit. The following day, Gwen discovers him taking refuge in the antique shop she owns. Several days pass as Gwen tries desperately to find a cure and Lawrence travels back to Blackmoor to settle things once and for all. Gwen, who meets up with the Gypsy Maleva, is told that the only way to save Lawrence is to kill him with a silver bullet. Aberline, along with a group of heavily armed officers and villagers, ready themselves for their next encounter with the beast of Blackmoor [Lawrence]; at the same time, Lawrence sneaks his way back into Talbot Hall where the final werewolf battle between him and his father takes place. After being severely wounded by his father, Lawrence viciously kills him by knocking him into the fireplace, then beheading him. Gwen and Aberline walk in to find Lawrence in werewolf form. In a failed attempt to kill Lawrence, Aberline is attacked and bitten by Lawrence just before he charges through Blackmoor's forests after Gwen. Weakened badly by his wounds, Aberline and his group hunt through the forest in search of Lawrence. Stopped in her tracks by a waterfall, Gwen finds herself cornered by the beast, but instead of killing him with the silver bullet, tries to help him recognize her. Starting to remember who Gwen is, Lawrence turns back to see that Aberline and his men getting closer and lets out several large howls. Realizing what she must do, Gwen grabs the pistol off the ground and pulls the trigger just as Lawrence launches to attack her. In his last few seconds, Lawrence transforms back into human form while he lies in Gwen's arms and thanks her for setting him free, after which he dies. Shortly after, a badly-wounded Aberline and his men arrive to find Gwen holding Lawrence's body. As Gwen sees that Aberline has been bitten, the camera cuts back to the burning Talbot Hall and the Wolfman's howl is heard one last time.

=== Wolf Man (2025) ===
In May 2020, Ryan Gosling was cast as Wolf Man for an upcoming reboot of the titular character. Lauren Shuker Blum and Rebecca Angelo co-wrote the script, from an original story pitched by Gosling. In 2023, Gosling was announced as having been replaced by Christopher Abbott as the character, renamed Blake Lovell, with Zac Chandler portraying a younger Blake. Leigh Whannell directs the film. The werewolves depicted in this film differentiate from the original Universal concept due to their lack of hair and other conventionally canine features, their ability to retain some level of self-awareness despite lack of control over their primal instincts, and their vulnerability to being killed without special means such as silver.

The story begins in early 1995 as a young Blake and his father Grady (portrayed by Sam Jaeger) encounter a werewolf, once a hiker infected by a virus known as "Face of the Wolf" to Native American tribes, while hunting in the woods as they hide in a hunting blind. 30 years later, Grady has been declared missing and presumed dead. Blake, now an unemployed writer, takes his wife Charlotte and daughter Ginger to his father's house, with guidance from Blake's childhood friend Derek Kiel. A werewolf (performed by Ben Prendergast) ambushes them, scratches Blake's arm, and kills Derek. As the film progresses, Blake slowly and permanently changes into a werewolf himself with heightened senses, canine teeth and claws forcing out his human teeth and fingernails, loss of head hair, patches of fur growing on his body, loss of some motor functions and the ability to verbally communicate with humans, skeletal deformities, and warped vision. Before fully transforming, Blake fatally bites his infector in the throat, which he identifies as Grady from his military tattoo, and they acknowledge one another as Grady dies. Blake attempts to leave to keep his family safe from the danger he is becoming but finishes transforming and cannot restrain himself from hunting them. After losing his foot to a foothold trap, Blake, in pain and wanting to die, manages to nonverbally convince Charlotte to give him a mercy kill with a plain hunting rifle. The dying Blake enjoys the comfort of his family, who look out into a beautiful valley he described seeing with his father.

== Other appearances ==
=== Television ===
- Talbot's werewolf grandson Luke is one of the protagonists of the 1994 animated series Monster Force, voiced by Paul Haddad. Talbot himself appears in flashbacks in the episode "Stalking the Beast". In the show's canon, Bela attacked and infected Talbot while trying to steal Talbot's wolf-headed cane which could allegedly control werewolves.
- Talbot appears in the sixteenth episode of the second season of Friday the 13th: The Series, portrayed by Matt Birman. A teenager obsessed with werewolf films uses a cursed camera to bring Talbot into the real world and starts using the monster as his private killing machine.
- In the animated superhero comedy Freakazoid!, an episode titled "House of Freakazoid" sees Freakazoid face off against a parody of Larry Talbot named "Lonnie Tallbutt" who is voiced by Mitch Schauer while his werewolf vocal effects were provided by Jim Cummings. He has sought out Dexter Douglas and his Freakazoid alter ego in the hopes he may help find a way to control the werewolf transformations. The episode includes reference to the then-revolutionary werewolf transformation sequences from the Universal series, as well as makes note of Chaney's overacting, with Lonnie often grabbing other characters by their shirt collars and exclaiming "You don't understand!" in a panicked tone. Freakazoid cured him of his werewolf form by briefly sending him into cyberspace.
- The TV series Mary Shelley's Frankenhole incorporates a parody character named Stewart Lawrence (voiced by Jay Johnston), a suicidal man who gave himself the curse of the werewolf by accidentally biting himself. He can only be killed at the hands of someone who loves him.
- In the TV series Frankenstein's Aunt, Talbot is portrayed by Flavio Bucci in a recurring role.
- In the TV series Penny Dreadful, Ethan Chandler's real name is revealed to be Ethan Lawrence Talbot (portrayed by Josh Hartnett) and he suffers from the curse of lycanthropy.

=== Other films ===
- The Wolf Man appears in Transylvania 6-5000, portrayed by Donald Gibb.
- The Wolf Man appears in The Monster Squad with his human form portrayed by Jon Gries and his werewolf form performed by Carl Thibault. He is among the monsters that ally with Count Dracula in order to obtain the amulet that would be used to banish them to Limbo.
- In the 1995 film Monster Mash and its 1960s stage precedent I'm Sorry the Bridge Is Out, You'll Have to Stay the Night, "Wolfie" is a spoof of the character, one of many spoofs of the Universal Monsters in the production, and is portrayed as a mother's boy. The stage version explicitly identifies his last name as Talbot. Adam Shankman portrays Wolfie in the film.
- Talbot appears in the 2000 animated direct-to-video film Alvin and the Chipmunks Meet the Wolfman, voiced by Maurice LaMarche while the werewolf sounds were provided by Frank Welker. Mr. Talbot appears as the new neighbor of the Chipmunks. He unintentionally infects Theodore with lycanthropy. Dave Seville later found out about Mr. Talbot being a werewolf when he transformed as it was also mentioned that he had a grandfather who was shot by silver bullets. In the climatic scene during the play adaption of Strange Case of Dr Jekyll and Mr Hyde, the two are cured after they bite each other while in their werewolf forms. By the end of the film, Talbot becomes the new principal after Principal Milliken retires as Dave is informed by Alvin that Talbot is not a werewolf anymore. Talbot silently thanks Theodore for breaking his curse.

=== Literature ===
- Talbot appears in Allan Rune Pettersson's novel Frankenstein's Aunt.
- Talbot is the protagonist in Harlan Ellison's novelette Adrift Just Off the Islets of Langerhans. The story won the 1975 Hugo Award for Best Novelette and the 1975 Locus Award for Best Novelette.
- A wolfman named Larry Talbot appeared in Roger Zelazny's supernatural fantasy novel A Night in the Lonesome October.
- Talbot is also a recurring character in various short stories authored by Neil Gaiman. The stories chronicle the seemingly immortal Talbot's life as both a werewolf and as an "adjustor", an occupation of loose definition and most commonly associated with that of a private eye.
- In Jeff Rovin's 1998 novel Return of the Wolf Man, it is revealed Talbot and Dracula had survived the fall they took at the end of Abbott and Costello Meet Frankenstein. Talbot kills Charles Stevens. Upon reverting to human form, he has Joan Raymond kill him and perform a ritual so he can never be revived. Talbot is revived anyway. He befriends Raymond's niece, Caroline Cooke, and turns his attention from his own death to stopping Dracula and Frankenstein. In the end, Talbot's werewolf form kills Dracula and then Caroline beats him to death with a silver candelabrum.
- The Wolf Man (1977), a novelization of the 1941 film written by Ramsay Campbell under the pseudonym Carl Dreadstone.
- The Wolfman (2010 novel), a novelization of the 2010 film written by Jonathan Maberry.
- Wolfman VS Dracula - "An Alternate History for Classic Film Monsters" (2010) by Philip J. Riley based on script for a discarded Universal movie which ended up becoming House of Dracula.
- Van Helsing: The Novel, a novelization of Van Helsing by Kevin Ryan.

=== Attractions ===
Larry Talbot appears in Curse of the Werewolf, a spinning roller coaster in Universal Epic Universe's Dark Universe that is based on The Wolf Man. Talbot also appears in the ride "Monsters Unchained: The Frankenstein Experiment", where he is among the monsters trapped by Henry Frankenstein's great-great-granddaughter Victoria Frankenstein.
