= Freckled Max and the Spooks =

1987 film by Juraj Jakubisko

- Directed by: Juraj Jakubisko
- Cinematography: Ján Duris
- Edited by: Patrik Pass
- Music by: Guido De Angelis
- Release date: 1987
- Running time: 96 minutes
- Countries: Czechoslovakia; West Germany

Freckled Max and the Spooks (Slovak: Pehavý Max a strašidlá) is a 1987 Czechoslovak/West German recut of the series Frankenstein’s Aunt into a 96-minute film.

== Story ==
The film is based on the Allan Rune Pettersson book Frankenstein's Aunt, but with several changes. Similar to the book, Aunt Hannah comes to Victor Frankenstein, but rather with the aim of finding a bride for her nephew so that there can be "little Frankensteins" in the family. However, Frankenstein is too busy for this. He is trying to create a man with the power of a machine and the brain of a genius.
