= Doctor Septimus Pretorius =

- Bride of Frankenstein character
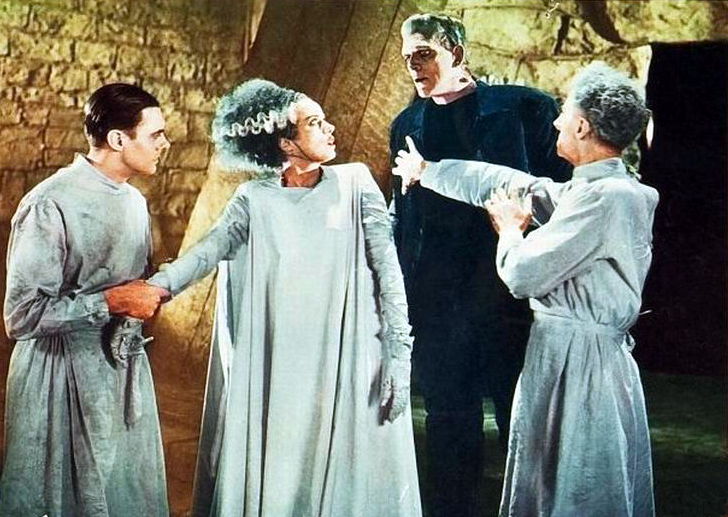
- Pretorius (right) holds back Frankenstein's monster
- Created by: William J. Hurlbut
- Portrayed by: Ernest Thesiger

In-universe information
- Species: Human
- Gender: Male
- Date of Birth: 1842-1843
- Status: Deceased (original film); Alive (Dark Horse continuity)

Doctor Septimus Pretorius is a fictional character who appears in the Universal film Bride of Frankenstein (1935) as the main antagonist. He is played by British stage and film actor Ernest Thesiger. Some sources claim he was originally to have been played by Bela Lugosi or Claude Rains. Others indicate that the part was conceived specifically for Thesiger.

== Character overview ==
Doctor Pretorius is a renegade mad scientist who persuades Henry Frankenstein to resume his experiments with bringing dead flesh to life. An amoral egomaniac, he has no regard for human life or ethics and cares only for his own prestige as a scientist.

Along with his sinister qualities, Pretorius is responsible for a large share of the film's dark humor. He eats a picnic dinner in a crypt, trades prissy banter with the Monster, and laments that the tiny ballerina he created "will only dance to Mendelssohn's 'Spring Song'". He claims that gin is his only weakness. Then later in the film, he claims his cigars are his only weakness when he first meets the Monster. Pretorius also delivers the famous toast "To a new world of gods and monsters!" midway through the film.

Pretorius is based on the Monster's own personality from the original novel.

== In the film ==
A professor of philosophy at the University of Ingolstadt, Pretorius first points young Henry on the path toward his unwholesome experiments in giving life to the dead. He himself is "booted out" from his teaching post "for knowing too much". Pretorius seeks out his former student after learning that the Monster has survived being trapped in the burning windmill in the climax of the first film. Pretorius himself acknowledges that he may be insane in a conversation with Frankenstein, saying, "You think I'm mad? Perhaps I am!"

Pretorius performs experiments creating life similar to Frankenstein's. He unveils to Frankenstein a group of various homunculi—miniature living humans which he has kept in bottles and claims to have grown from "seed" like cultures. Each figure represents a different character:

- A Queen which he claims was his first experiment.
- A King which is madly in love with the Queen and has a resemblance to Henry VIII. Pretorius has to be very careful with the King and works to keep the King and Queen separated. This is even shown when the King briefly breaks out of his bottle only to be caught by Pretorius and put back in his bottle with his cup on top of the bottle.
- An Archbishop which disapproves of what the King is doing to win the Queen's heart.
- The Devil who is depicted as a man in a black suit and a cape. Pretorious gleefully compares his own visage to that of the Devil by saying, "There's a certain resemblance to me, don't you think? Or do I flatter myself?"
- A Ballerina dancer who will only dance to Felix Mendelssohn's "Spring Song".
- A Mermaid grown from "an experiment with seaweed" which lives in a water-filled bottle.
- An Infant who was mostly edited out except for certain camera shots.

He has been unsuccessful in creating a full-sized human. He proposes to Frankenstein that together they create a mate for his monster, with Frankenstein building the body and Pretorius supplying an artificially-grown brain. Frankenstein initially balks at the idea, but Pretorius reminds him that he is capable of exposing him to the authorities as the creator of the Monster who has done so much damage.

Later, he meets the Monster in a crypt where he has gone to steal bodies with his hired help Karl and Ludwig. Pretorius is dining using the top of a coffin as a picnic table. When the Monster asks him "Friend?", Pretorius gives him the remains of his chicken. He tells the Monster of his plans to create a mate for him.

The Monster, eager for companionship of any kind, considers Pretorius his friend. From then on, the Monster is willing to do anything that the scientist desires, such as kidnapping Henry's wife Elizabeth in order to force Frankenstein to help Pretorius. Henry agrees and together the two scientists create the Bride of Frankenstein.

However, even the Bride finds her would-be husband repulsive, and the heartbroken Monster decides to end his life by blowing up the laboratory. He instructs Henry and Elizabeth to run, but barks at Pretorius and the Bride to stay, saying "we belong dead". Before Pretorius can flee, the Monster blows up the laboratory and the castle, presumably killing Pretorius, the Bride, and himself.

== Psychosexual aspects of the character ==
Dr. Pretorius is frequently identified as homosexual, or as near to homosexual as could be presented on-screen in 1935. There is no direct reference to homosexuality in the film. Bride of Frankenstein director James Whale was openly gay and frequently included camp elements in his films. He directed Thesiger (himself identified in some sources as more or less openly gay) to play the part in a way that later viewers who are members of the queer community have interpreted as an "over the top caricature of a bitchy and aging homosexual".

Gay film historian Vito Russo stops short of identifying Pretorius as gay, calling him instead "sissified" ("sissy" itself being Hollywood code for "homosexual"). Pretorius serves as a figure of seduction and temptation, pulling Frankenstein away from his bride on their wedding night to engage in the "unnatural" act of non-procreative life. The Breen Office, responsible for enforcing Hollywood's Production Code, let Pretorius' behavior pass unchallenged. A novelisation of the film published in England made the implication even more clear, having Pretorius say to Frankenstein: "Be fruitful and multiply. Let us obey the Biblical injunction: you of course, have the choice of natural means; but as for me, I am afraid that there is no course open to me but the scientific way."

== Other appearances ==
Pretorius appears in Kim Newman's crossover novel Dracula Cha Cha Cha, as a colleague of H. P. Lovecraft's Herbert West. He appears as one of the horror movie spoofs in Jesus Christ Vampire Hunter and also appears in Allan Rune Pettersson's novel Frankenstein's Aunt Returns.

In the Amicus horror film The House That Dripped Blood (1970), Geoffrey Bayldon, playing a mysterious antique shop owner, is made up and costumed to look like Ernest Thesiger as Pretorius.

In the 1973 NBC-TV miniseries Frankenstein: The True Story, James Mason portrays a Pretorius-like figure named Dr. Polidori (named for Lord Byron's real-life physician, John William Polidori, who was part of the 1816 gathering that produced Mary Shelley's novel and also the author of the story "The Vampyre"). Mason's Dr. Polidori enlists Victor to assist in creating the female creature Prima (portrayed by Jane Seymour).

The 1986 film From Beyond adds a Dr. Edward Pretorius at Miskatonic University (played by Ted Sorel) as a dark mentor for Crawford Tillinghast (Jeffrey Combs). This Pretorius is an impotent sadist (with a room full of bondage gear) who is assimilated by "the Beyond" and attempts to drag others into it, boasting that the pineal gland growth brought on by the resonator is like "an orgasm of the mind".

The 1989 Akif Pirinçci novel Felidae and its 1994 animated feature film adaptation feature an insane Professor Preterius in the backstory performing increasingly dark experiments on the cat Claudandus.

In the 1998 independent film Gods and Monsters, directed by Bill Condon, Ernest Thesiger as Pretorius is played by Arthur Dignam in a flashback about the filming of Bride of Frankenstein. An earlier scene shows Whale's gardener Clayton Boon (portrayed by Brendan Fraser) watching Bride of Frankenstein on television, specifically the climactic scene of Pretorius and Frankenstein unveiling the Bride.

In the 2007 Frankenstein TV film, the character of Professor Jane Pretorius is based on Septimus Pretorius and served as Victoria Frankenstein's boss. She was portrayed by Lindsay Duncan.

In the Dark Horse "Universal's Monsters" novel The Bride of Frankenstein: Pandora's Bride, Pretorius somehow survives the destruction of the tower lab along with the Bride. They escape to Germany where he teaches her to become her own woman.

In Mary Shelley's Frankenhole (2010-2012), the character Professor Sanguinaire Polidori (voiced by Scott Adsit) is based on Septimus Pretorius.

In Bernard Rose's 2015 film Frankenstein, Dr. Pretorius is portrayed by artist David Pressler.

The character of Doctor Henry Jekyll (portrayed by Russell Crowe) in the 2017 film The Mummy, the only film in Universal's Dark Universe reboot, is loosely based on Pretorius, quoting his toast to "a new world of gods and monsters".

The Darkmoor Monster Makeup Experience at Dark Universe in Universal Epic Universe is themed around Dr. Pretorius's laboratory, complete with various homunculi in jars.
