= Frankenstein's Aunt Returns =

Book by Allan Rune Pettersson

- Hodder & Stoughton edition 1990
- Author: Allan Rune Pettersson
- Original title: Frankensteins faster - igen!
- Publication date: 1989
- Publication place: Sweden
- Preceded by: Frankenstein's Aunt

Frankenstein's Aunt Returns is a novel by Allan Rune Pettersson that was first published in Sweden in 1989. The book is a sequel to the 1978 book Frankenstein's Aunt. The story is about Franklin (named after Benjamin Franklin), a child created by Doctor Frankenstein with the help of Doctor Pretorius for the monster and his bride. The child is inventive like his namesake and has a talent for practical jokes. This leads again to conflicts with the villagers, who are far from happy to have another monster in their midst.

== See also ==
- Frankenstein's Aunt

== Literature ==
- Allan Rune Pettersson: Frankenstein's Aunt Returns, ISBN 0-340-53244-0
