= Frankenstein's Aunt (TV series) =

1986 TV series

- Viveca Lindfors as Hannah Frankenstein and Jacques Herlin as Igor
- Created by: Juraj Jakubisko
- Starring: Viveca Lindfors as Hannah Frankenstein; Martin Hreben as Max; Gerhard Karzel as Albert; Barbara De Rossi as Klara; Eddie Constantine as Alois; Flavio Bucci as Talbot
- Countries of origin: Austria, West Germany, France, Czechoslovakia, Spain, Sweden, Italy
- No. of episodes: 7

Production
- Running time: approx. 55 min (per episode)

Original release
- Network: ORF; Slovenská televízia France 3 SVT1; Rai 1 TVE
- Release: 1986 – 1986

== Plot ==
Similar to Frankenstein's Aunt by Allan Rune Pettersson, Aunt Hannah comes to Frankenstein with the aim of finding a bride for her nephew so that the family will gain some "little Frankensteins". He, however, is too busy for anything like that. He tries to create a man with the power of a machine and the brain of a genius. Unlike in the novel, Aunt Hannah meets more spooks like a merman, a fire spirit and a White Lady and the orphan Max, who is running away from a circus.

== Background ==
The makers of Frankenstein's Aunt, Jaroslav Dietl and Juraj Jakubisko, interpreted the classic Frankenstein theme in a humorous way tending to parody. Beyond their intent to entertain, their goal was to emphasize the triumph of reason and sanity over human aggression and intolerance.

== Production ==
The director J. Jakubisko said about the production: "This seven country co-production was a challenge for me. The producers' wish was to see spooks from every single culture so it would be familiar for children around the world. So we found ourselves in Babylon during the production - many languages, many spooks."

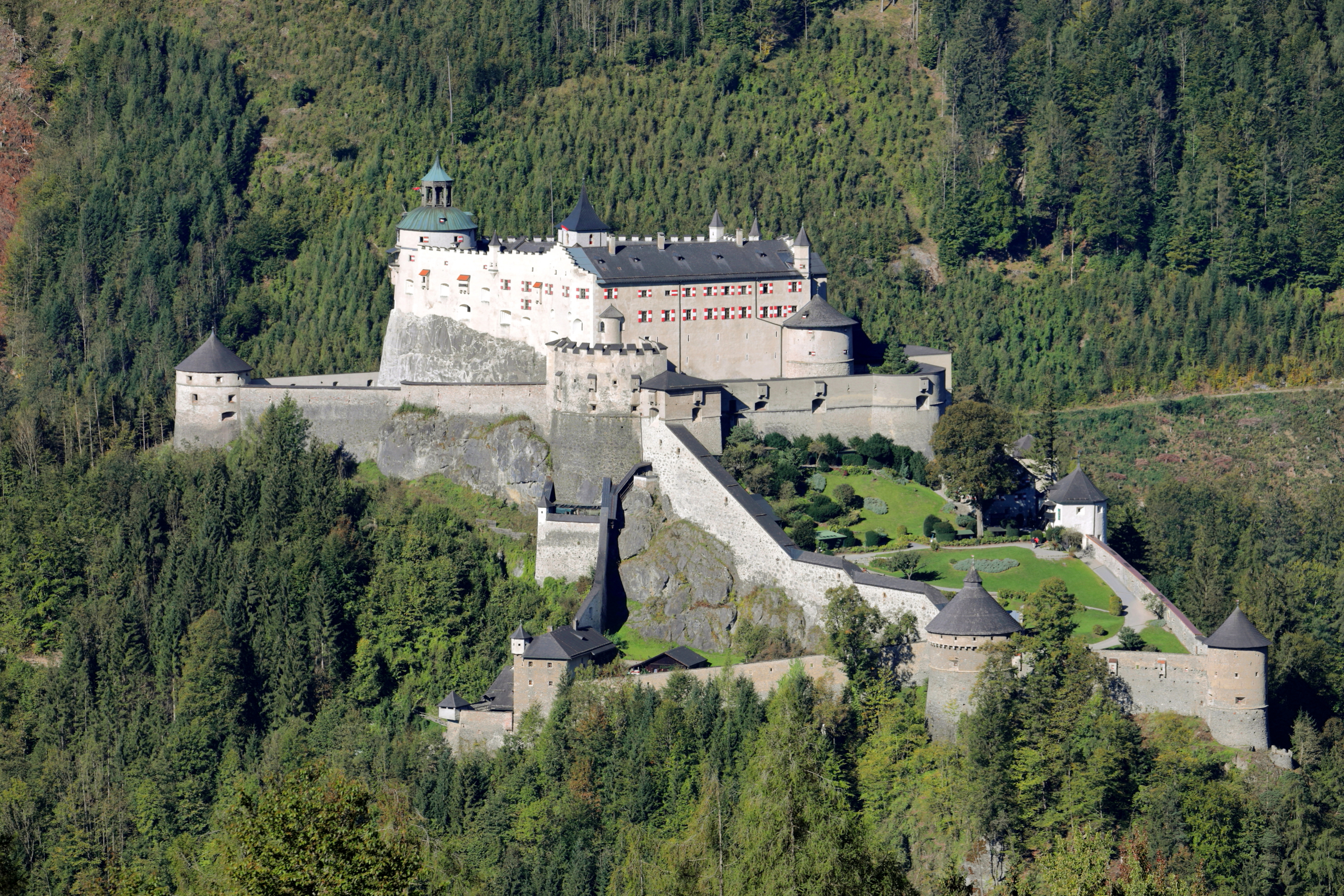
Among others, Hohenwerfen Castle was used to film the exterior of Frankenstein's Castle

The series was an international co-production from:

- Taurus Film Munich (Germany)
- MR-Film (Austria)
- Československá televízia Bratislava (Czechoslovakia)
- Films du Sabre and FR-3 (France)
- SVT 1 (Sweden)
- Raiuno (Italy) and
- TVE (Spain).

Filming locations were Hallstatt, the environ of Salzburg, Dachstein, Boskovice and Werfen with Burg Hohenwerfen.

Jacques Herlin, who played Igor, said in an interview, that the filming was a lot of fun, the only bad side being Viveca Lindfors who hated the director from the first day. According to him, she said to the director, "As far as I'm concerned, you're a shit. I've signed the contract, but won't agree with you. My character will smoke a cigar, even if you don't like it. Go fuck yourself." Nevertheless, Herlin added that he actually liked Viveca. He described the director as crazy - a poet, ex painter and friend of Fellini.

The character of the "White Lady" (played by Mercedes Sampietro) was inspired in Elizabeth Bathory(1560–1614). She is thought to have tortured hundreds of maids to death, and according to the legend she was cursed to haunt her castle. Her character in the series was moderated, similarities are still the same first name and some insinuations. The series' director, Juraj Jakubisko made also Bathory, a movie about her, which was released in 2008.

Ferdy Mayne, who played Count Dracula, played a similar character as Count Krolock in The Fearless Vampire Killers (1967).

== Cast ==
- Viveca Lindfors as Hannah von Frankenstein
- Martin Hreben as Max
- Gerhard Karzel as Albert
- Barbara De Rossi as Klara
- Eddie Constantine as Alois as Water Spirit
- Flavio Bucci as Talbot as Werewolf
- Ferdy Mayne as Count Dracula
- Mercedes Sampietro as Elisabeth
- Tilo Prückner as Sepp
- Bolek Polívka as Henry Frankenstein
- Marie Drahokoupilová as Mrs. Karch
- Gail Gatterburg as Bertha
- Sancho Gracia as Investigation Judge
- Jacques Herlin as Igor
- Andrej Hryc as Schmied
- Milan Lasica as Teacher
- Roman Skamene as Hans

== Episodes ==
No.	Title
1	"The Birth"
2	"The Clean-Up"
3	"The Bride"
4	"The Cradle"
5	"The Ladies' Man"
6	"The Car"
7	"The Wedding"

== Alternative and other versions ==
A recut of the series in a 96-minute movie was made with the title Freckled Max and the Spooks.

A musical for schools is based on the novel of Allan Rune Petterson.

== Nomination ==
In 1988 it was nominated best film in the International Fantasy Film Awards.
