= Frankenstein's Aunt (novel) =

1978 novel by Allan Rune Pettersson

- First edition
- Author: Allan Rune Pettersson
- Original title: Frankensteins faster
- Genre: Horror novel
- Publication date: 1978
- Publication place: Sweden
- Followed by: Frankenstein's Aunt Returns

Frankenstein's Aunt (Swedish: Frankensteins faster) is a horror novel by Allan Rune Pettersson, first published in Sweden in 1978.

== Story ==
The book is about Hannah Frankenstein, the Baron's aunt, who comes to Frankenstein's Castle to put it back in order, following the chaos caused by her nephew's experiments. There, she meets the unusual inhabitants of the castle, which, apart from Frankenstein's monster, also include Count Dracula and Larry Talbot the werewolf.

== Background ==
The book is an homage to the Universal Frankenstein films of the 1930s and 1940s. Its title is an untranslatable pun: in Swedish, Frankenstein's mother's sister would be his "moster" whereas his father's sister is his "faster". So, instead of Frankenstein's mo[n]ster, we have his faster, which is not only a pun but an alliteration.
