= Victor Frankenstein =

Character from Mary Shelley's 1818 novel

- Frankenstein; or, The Modern Prometheus character
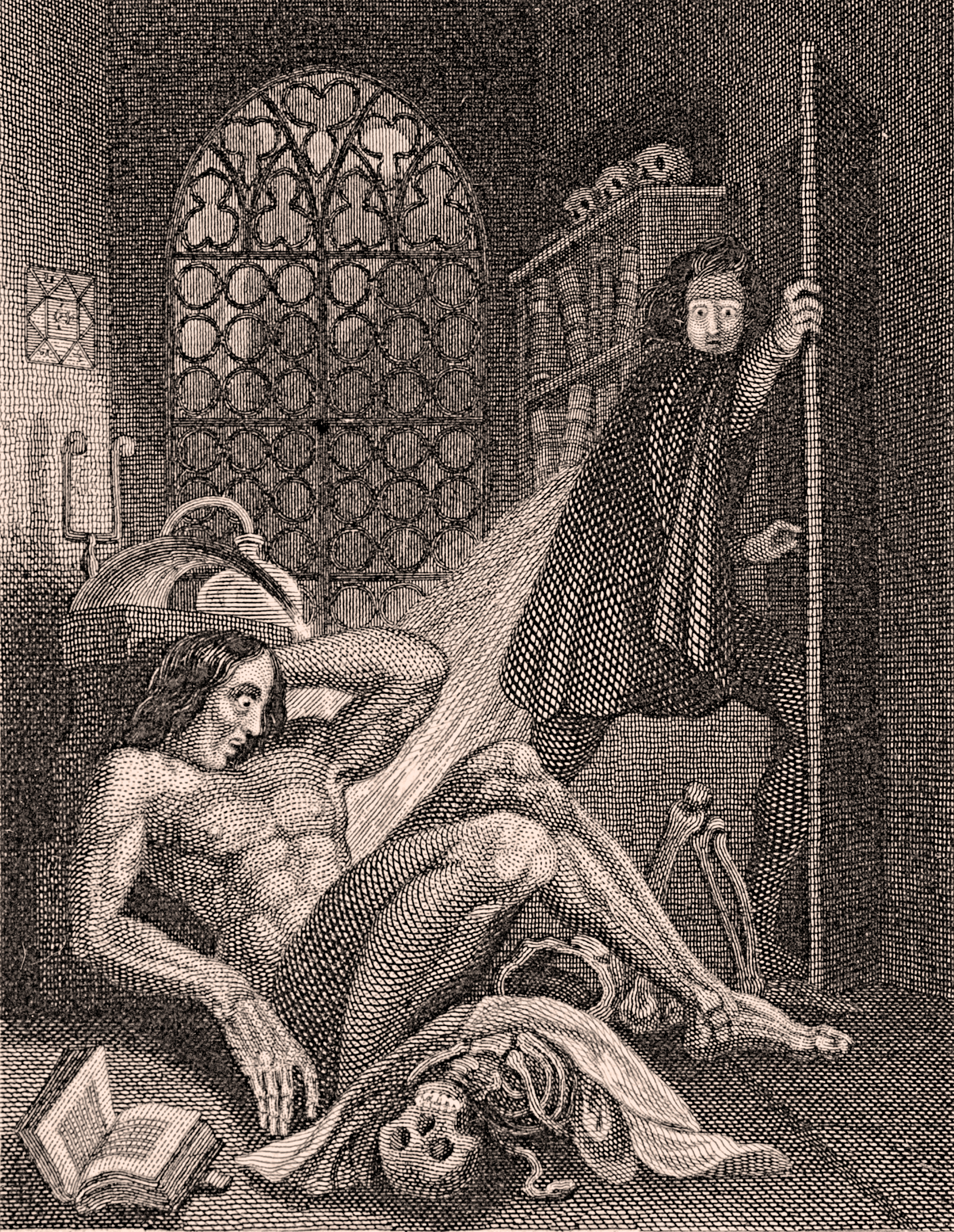
- Victor Frankenstein recoiling from his creation
- Created by: Mary Shelley
- Portrayed by: Various
- Voiced by: Various

In-universe information
- Aliases: Dr. Frankenstein; Heinrich "Henry" von Frankenstein (1931 film); The Modern Prometheus
- Gender: Male
- Occupation: Scientist
- Family: Alphonse Frankenstein (father); Caroline Beaufort (mother); Ernest Frankenstein (brother); William Frankenstein (brother); Elizabeth Lavenza (adoptive sister/cousin)
- Spouse: Elizabeth Lavenza
- Relatives: Frederick Frankenstein (grandson); Victoria Frankenstein (descendant)
- Religion: Roman Catholic
- Origin: Naples, Italy
- Nationality: Swiss
- Creation: Frankenstein's monster

Dr. Victor Frankenstein is a fictional character and the titular protagonist of Mary Shelley's 1818 Gothic novel Frankenstein; or, The Modern Prometheus and its adaptations. He is a young Italian-born Swiss mad scientist who, after studying chemical processes and the decay of living things at university, gains an insight into the creation of life and gives life to his own creature (often referred to as Frankenstein's monster, or often colloquially referred to as simply "Frankenstein"). Victor later regrets meddling with nature through his creation, as he inadvertently endangers his own life and the lives of his family and friends when the creature seeks revenge against him. He is first introduced in the novel when he is seeking to catch the monster near the North Pole and is saved from potential fatality by Robert Walton and his crew.

== Origin of the character ==
Percy Shelley, Mary's husband, served as a significant influence for the character. Victor was a pen name of Percy Shelley's, as in the 1810 collection of poetry he wrote with his sister Elizabeth, Original Poetry by Victor and Cazire. There is speculation that Percy was one of Mary Shelley's models for Victor Frankenstein; while a student at Eton College, he had "experimented with electricity and magnetism as well as with gunpowder and numerous chemical reactions", and his rooms at the University of Oxford were filled with scientific equipment. Percy Shelley was the first-born son of a wealthy, politically connected country squire, and a descendant of Sir Bysshe Shelley, 1st Baronet of Castle Goring, and Richard Fitzalan, 10th Earl of Arundel. As stated in the novel, Frankenstein's family is one of the most distinguished of the Genevese republic and his ancestors were counselors and syndics. Percy Shelley's sister and Frankenstein's adopted sister were both named Elizabeth. On 22 February 1815, Mary Shelley delivered a baby two months premature; the child died two weeks later. The question of Frankenstein's responsibility to the creature – in some ways like that of a parent to a child – is one of the main themes of the book.

Some aspects of the character are believed to have been inspired by 17th-century alchemist Johann Konrad Dippel. Certainly, the author and people in her environment were aware of the experiment on electricity and dead tissues by Luigi Galvani and his nephew Giovanni Aldini and the work of Alessandro Volta at the University of Pavia.

One of the characters of François-Félix Nogaret's 1790 novella Le Miroir des événemens actuels, ou la Belle au plus offrant is an inventor named "Wak-wik-vauk-an-son-frankésteïn", then abridged as "Frankésteïn", but there is no proof Shelley had read it.

== History ==
Victor Frankenstein was born in Naples (according to the 1831 edition of Shelley's novel) to a Swiss family from Geneva. He was the son of Alphonse Frankenstein and Caroline Beaufort, who died of scarlet fever when Victor was 17. He describes his ancestry thus: "I am by birth a Genevese; and my family is one of the most distinguished of that republic. My ancestors had been for many years counsellors and syndics; and my father had filled several public situations with honour and reputation." Frankenstein has two younger brothers – William, the youngest, and Ernest, the middle child. Frankenstein falls in love with Elizabeth Lavenza, who became his adoptive sister (his blood cousin in the 1818 edition) and, eventually, his fiancée.

As a boy, Frankenstein is interested in the works of alchemists such as Cornelius Agrippa, Paracelsus, and Albertus Magnus, and he longs to discover the fabled elixir of life. At the age of fifteen, he loses interest in both these pursuits and in science as a whole after he sees a tree destroyed by a lightning strike and a scientist explains the theory of electricity to him. It seems to him as if nothing can really be known about the world, and he instead devotes himself to studying mathematics, which he describes as "being built upon secure foundations." However, at the University of Ingolstadt in Bavaria, Frankenstein develops a fondness for chemistry, and within two years, his commitment and scientific ability allow him to make discoveries that earn him admiration at the university. He then becomes curious about the nature of life and his studies lead him to a miraculous discovery that enables him to create life in inanimate matter.

Assembling a humanoid creature from parts of corpses and ambiguous means involving electricity, Frankenstein successfully brings it to life, but he is horrified by the creature's ugliness. He flees from his creation, who disappears and, after several negative encounters with the locals, swears revenge on his creator. When his youngest brother, William, is found murdered, Frankenstein knows instantly that his creation is the killer, but says nothing. The Frankensteins' housekeeper, Justine, is blamed for the boy's death and executed; Frankenstein is wracked with guilt but does not come forward with the truth because he thinks no one will believe his story, and he is afraid of the reactions such a story would provoke.

The creature approaches Frankenstein and begs him to create a female companion for him. Frankenstein agrees, but ultimately destroys this creation, fearing the idea of a whole race of monsters being born. Enraged, the creature swears revenge; he kills Henry Clerval, Frankenstein's best friend, and promises Frankenstein, "I shall be with you on your wedding night." The creature keeps his promise by strangling Elizabeth on her matrimonial bed. Within a few days, Frankenstein's father dies of grief. With nothing else left to live for, Frankenstein dedicates his life to destroying the creature.

Frankenstein pursues the "fiend" or "demon" (as he calls his creation) to the Arctic, intending to destroy it. Although he is rescued by a ship attempting an expedition to the North Pole, he dies after relating his tale to the ship's captain, Robert Walton. His creature, upon discovering the death of his creator, is overcome by sorrow and guilt and vows to commit suicide by burning himself alive in "the Northernmost extremity of the globe;" he then disappears, never to be seen or heard from again.

== Characterization ==
While many subsequent film adaptations (notably the 1931 movie Frankenstein and the Hammer Films series starring Peter Cushing) have portrayed Frankenstein as the prototypical "mad scientist", the novel portrayed him as a tragic figure.

In the book, Frankenstein has many characteristics of a great scientist. At a young age, he has the initiative to study natural philosophy and mathematics. As an adult, he attributes his accomplishments in chemistry to the effort he put into the discipline, rather than his intelligence. Frankenstein also has great curiosity about the world, and even recalls that some of his earliest memories were his realizations about the laws of nature. It is his curiosity about the cause of life that leads him to creating the monster.

Obsession plays a major role in the development of Frankenstein's character. First, as a child, he is obsessed with reading books on alchemy, astrology, and other pseudo-sciences. Later, as a young man, he often spends the entire night working in his laboratory. He then becomes enthralled with the study of life sciences – mainly dealing with death and the reanimation of corpses. Finally, after the monster is created, Frankenstein is consumed with guilt, despair, and regret, leading him to obsess over the nature of his creation and seek revenge.

== Mythological influences ==
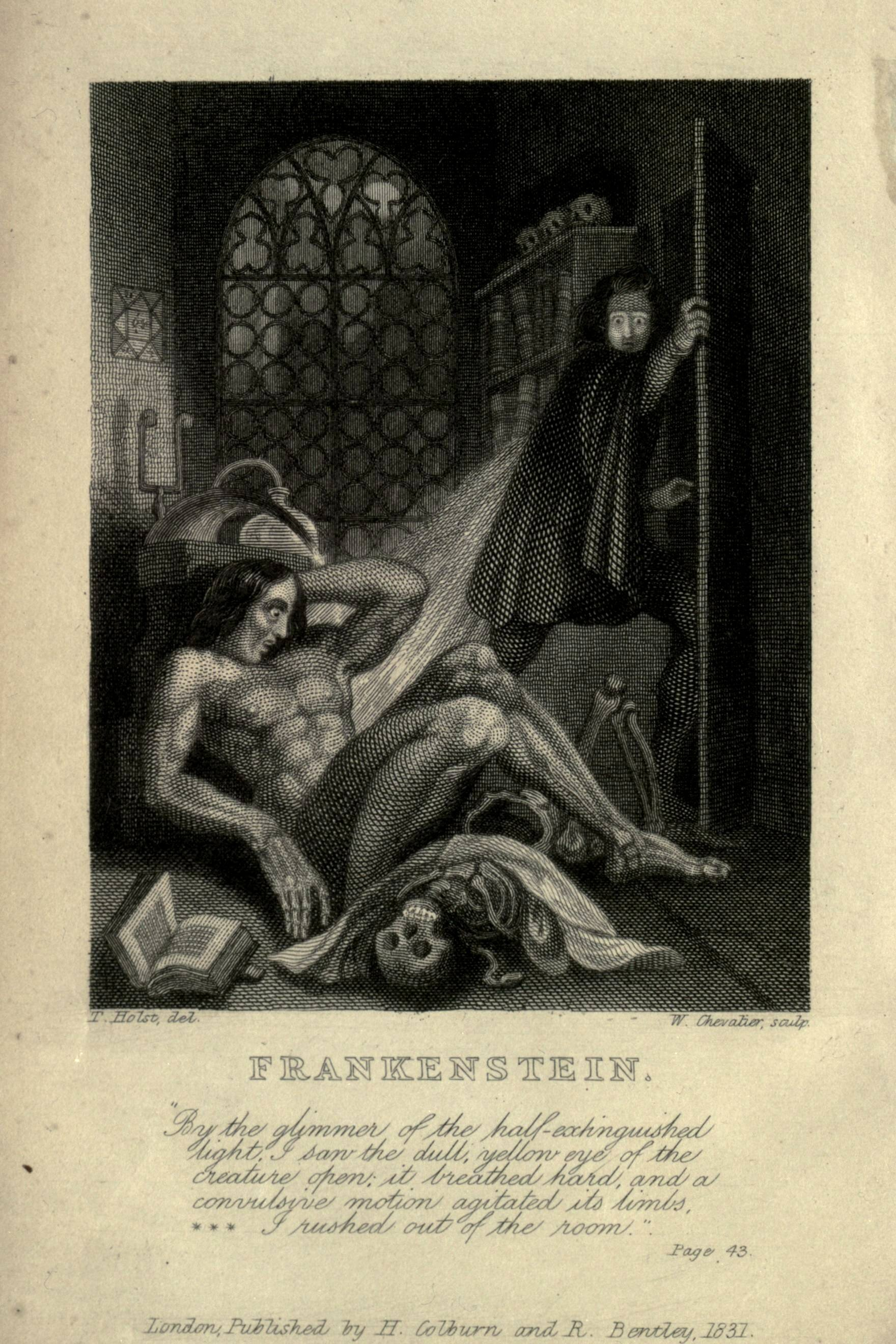
Frontispiece from the 1831 edition.

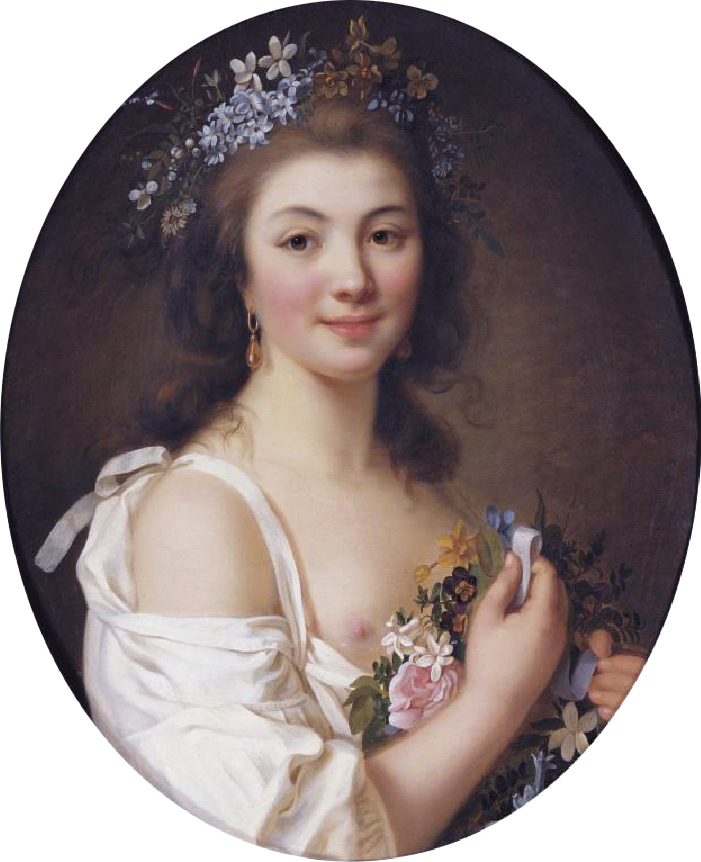
Félicité de Genlis by Lemoine.

Mary Shelley's novel presents a Promethean theme of defiance of the gods, in reference to the mythological hero. The title of the novel echoes the call of the French materialist philosopher, La Mettrie (1709–1751), in 1747, in his Homme machine, for the advent of a "new Prometheus" who would set in motion a reconstituted human machine. (Note: Insofar as La Mettrie was part of a movement of mechanistic philosophers and even technicians striving to create an artificial man, the emphasis right from the start is on manufacturing, and on the very modern.)

Mary Shelley did not invent the expression, which had already been used in the early 18th century and, closer to its end, by Immanuel Kant, and Frankenstein goes far beyond the technical substratum, presenting, in addition to its borrowings from myth, metaphysical, aesthetic and ethical aspects.

Frankenstein tells the story of a man seeking to surpass his condition, akin to that of Icarus. Frankenstein also evokes Pygmalion, king of Cyprus and a sculptor in love with the statue of a woman he has just completed, a new Galatea of flesh and blood after Aphrodite breathes life into her. The latter myth was known to Mary Shelley, who had read it first and foremost in the Nouveaux contes moraux et nouvelles historiques, published by Madame de Genlis in 1802, then in John Dryden's translation, again published in 1810, (Note: In fact, an anonymous writer declared in Fraser's Magazine, January 1837, that he intended to write a kind of parody entitled The New Frankenstein, based on an illustration in this translation.) and which she also knew from Rameau's Pigmalion (1748), (Note: This is the spelling used to present and publish Jean-Philippe Rameau's work.) reductions of which for fortepiano were circulating throughout Europe.

The novel also contains hints of Don Juanism: the hero's quest is never satisfied, and like the statue of the commander, the monster appears and precipitates Frankenstein into the bowels of a psychological hell, whose fire is the "bite" of glaciation. It also evokes the more recent eighteenth-century Faust; Shelley refers to the Faustian idea that knowledge intoxicates the soul and proves dangerous when it becomes excessive, becoming in itself "a serpent's bite".

=== References to the original Prometheus myth ===
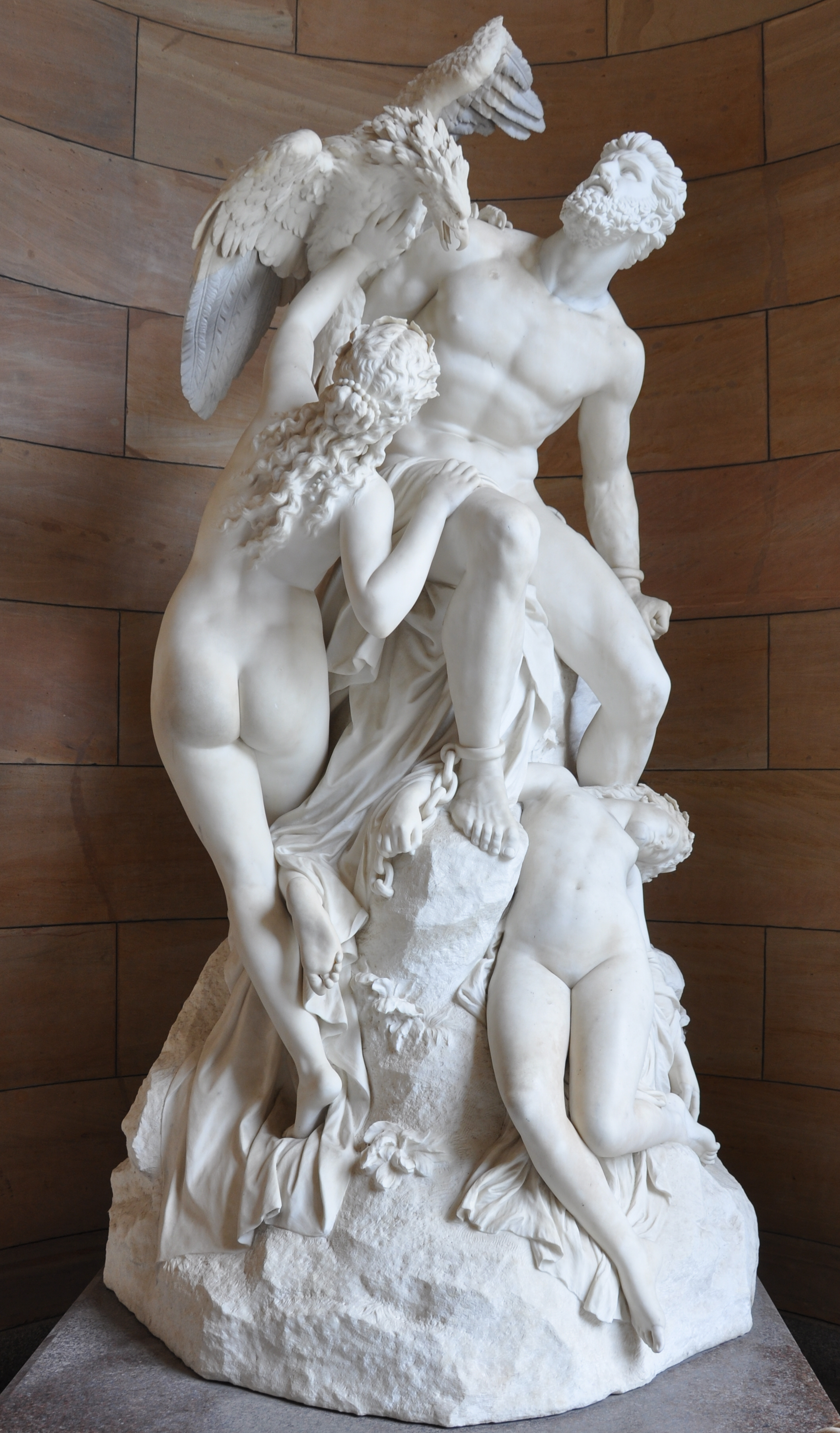
Prometheus by Eduard Müller (1828–1895).

Mary Shelley first refers to the Greek myth of Prometheus, struggling against the omnipotence of Zeus, stealing fire from Olympus and bringing it to mankind to help and save them. In this version of the myth, the rebellious Titan intends to break human destiny by giving them the primary element of energy, and thus of technology, as well as a symbol of Knowledge. He is Prometheus Pyrophoros, the bearer, transporter and provider of fire. This Prometheus, whose name means "Provider", sees beyond the human condition, which he befriends. As a Titan, he enjoys immortality, and his punishment, according to Aeschylus, is to be chained to Mount Caucasus in India and tortured by the eagle, which gnaws away at his liver every day, regenerating it at night. Byron had written his poem Prometheus in 1816, but Percy Bysshe Shelley's Prometheus Unbound was another contemporary work featuring the mythical figure. Although written after Frankenstein, between 1818 and 1819, Mary Shelley was familiar with its gestation and genesis as Percy Bysshe Shelley was her lover and eventual husband. Prometheus Unbound, a four-act play depicting the Titan, more or less mingled with the Lucifer of Milton's Paradise Lost, a champion of moral and humanitarian virtues, freed from the yoke of Jupiter and heralding the liberation of mankind.

It was likely from Ovid's Prometheus that Mary Shelley drew both the idea of a living humanoid and the method for breathing life into it. What was the work of a Titan became that of a mortal, but one intoxicated by science to the point of believing in his own immortality. Like the Titan, he uses know-how, in this case acquired through study, particularly of the so-called natural sciences, physics and chemistry.

In many ways, however, it is a departure from the Prometheus Unbound, which combines the liberation of the rebellious hero with the downfall of a cruel god, the principle and symbol of evil. The catastrophe takes on cosmic proportions, and the hopes of the modern soul are focused on the advent of a new universe. Shelley's stubborn belief in the ultimate triumph of love and the avenue of the Golden Age (Note: The Golden Age and Paradise represent two figures of a lost original happiness. In the Greco-Latin tradition, the Golden Age is a primordial state where men live without suffering or aging, where generous nature exempts them from work, where peace and justice reign: the Golden Race still lives in proximity to the gods. This same proximity is that of Adam and Eve in the Garden of Eden. A place of delights and perfection, Paradise has at its center a spring of living water, which divides into four rivers that will irrigate the world, and two trees. For most of the Christian tradition, Paradise is on Earth, in the East or West, but access to it is now forbidden to mankind. For many utopians, particularly in the 19th century, time must be reversed, with the Golden Age no longer at the beginning but at the end, as the end of history and progress. In fact, in the Hesiodic myth of the Golden Age, time is cyclical; and in the Judeo-Christian tradition, the coming of the Messiah is a promise of restoration.) is fulfilled in the victory over Evil of a hero free of all taint and entirely worthy of representing the Good. Purified by suffering, inhabited by humility and mansuétude, disavowing his ancient pride and hatred, he becomes on his rock a figure of Christ on the cross. His deliverance implies the fall of Jupiter, which is precisely the birth of the Golden Age.

The only thing Shelley's Prometheus Unbound and his wife's Frankenstein have in common, then, is the act of transgression - beneficial in one, evil in the other, responsible in the former, irresponsible in the latter.

Only a few elements in Frankenstein recall this first version of the myth. First of all, the ambition shared by Walton, Frankenstein and even the monster in the central episode of the De Lacey family, to help mankind. Walton hopes to discover a hidden paradise beyond the polar ice caps; Frankenstein claims to conquer death and improve the human race; the monster provides the De Laceys with firewood: here, in grotesque miniature - for while he possesses the Titan's power, he lacks its mighty beauty - is a vignette reproducing exactly the main gesture of the myth, that of providing man with fire. The second element is fire itself, the symbolism of which runs through the novel: the fire-energy of the storm that strikes down the old oak; the fire that is stolen and then lost, giving warmth, light and nourishment; the destructive fire that sets the cottage ablaze; the fire of the pyre or of Hell, or the purifying fire that, as the book promises, will forever consume the monster itself, a morbid emanation of Victor's pseudo-creative imagination. The third point is undoubtedly the allegory of the chained Titan's suffering: such is Victor's mortifying despair, walled in by his silence and pain; such is also the absolute solitude of the monster rejected by his creator and the common man, (Note: The etymology of the word "monster" implies the gaze of others, that which is shown: monstrum.) deprived of his feminine complement; such is finally, albeit to a lesser degree, the growing anxiety which, little by little, undermines the youthful and initially conquering enthusiasm of Robert Walton, alienated from his family, his crew and the commerce of men.

=== References to Ovid's Prometheus ===
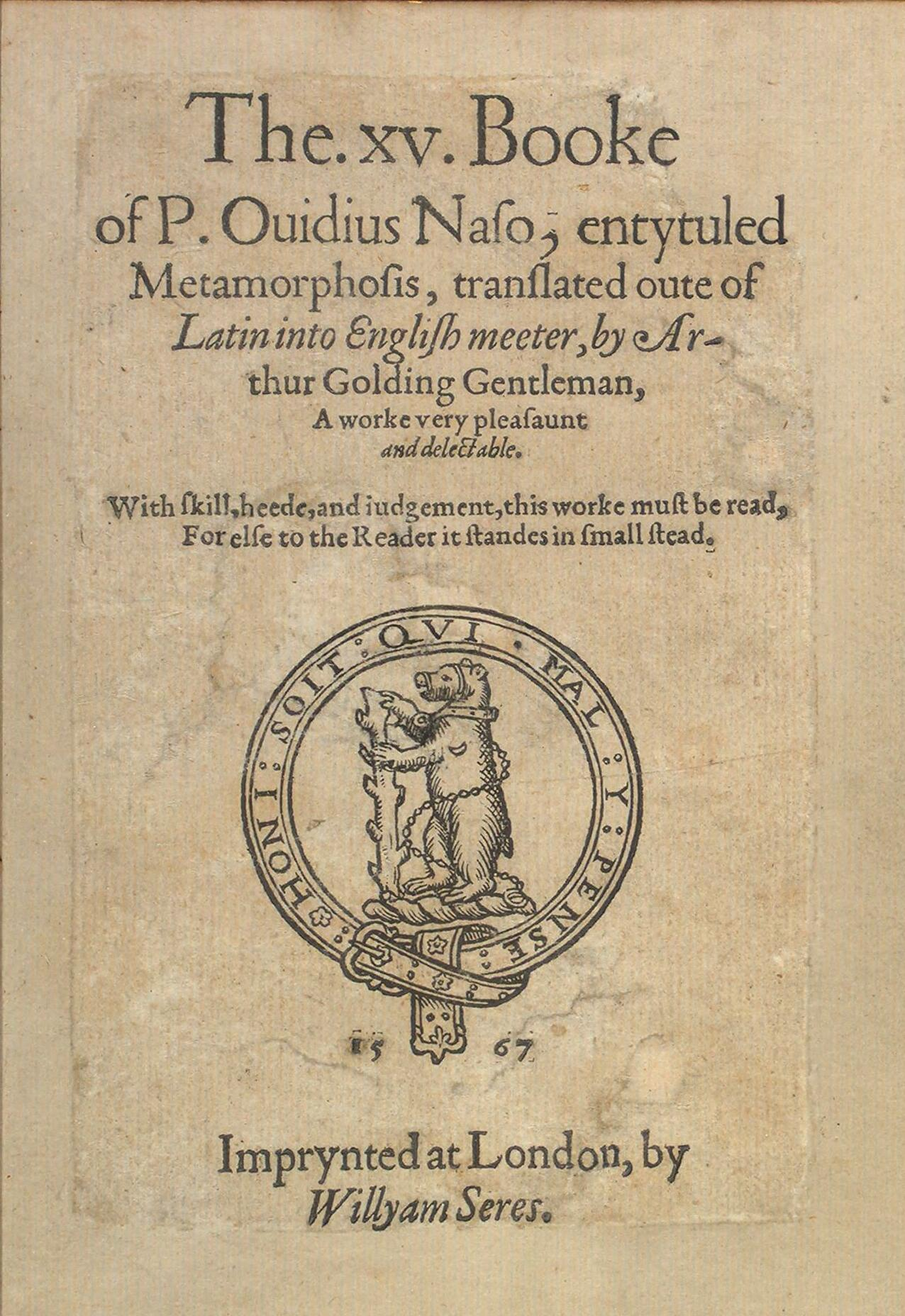
Ovid's Metamorphoses, English edition of 1567.

Mary Shelley then borrows from the Prometheus of Ovid's Metamorphoses, in which the Titan, rather than coming to man's aid, usurps the power of the gods, then fabricates man and confers on him, through manipulations of "ethereal energy", the most mysterious and sacred of goods - life. He is the Prometheus Pyrophoros et plasticator, i.e. the thief of fire, then the shaper, the craftsman who transforms clay into man. Beyond the original meaning of Ovid's title, for there is more to it than a "change of form" (Meta-morphoses: In noua fert animus mutatas dicere formas / Corpora), this is an act of creation, but with a technique, materials and energy.

It was from Ovid's Prometheus that Mary Shelley drew both the idea of a living humanoid and the method for breathing life into it. What was the work of a Titan became that of a mortal, but one intoxicated by science to the point of believing in his own immortality. Like the Titan, he uses know-how, in this case acquired through study, particularly of the so-called natural sciences, physics and chemistry. Like the Titan too, he is seized (numbed) by a feverish enthusiasm for his decision, the accomplishment of his work, the final technical act conferring the spark of life. The "energy of the ether" was replaced, in a period of scientific discovery, by what Victor's intuition first called "particles of celestial fire", then what his knowledge enabled him to identify as "the galvanizing use of electricity". He succeeded in what the scientists of the time hoped one day to achieve, in fact the old foolish dream of the alchemists; the idea, the imagination, the enthusiasm, it was first Cornelius Agrippa and Paracelsus, then more rationally, Professor Waldman, no doubt inspired Mary Shelley by Humphry Davy, writing in 1816: "science has conferred on him [man] powers that might almost be called creative [...] to interrogate nature [...] in mastery [...], and to penetrate its deepest secrets"; fiction erases Humphry Davy's "almost" and takes the plunge. (Note: Mary Shelley frequently saw Humphry Davy at his parents' home and was familiar with his theories and experiments, as Ford K. Brown testifies.) There is thus a very modern dimension to Mary Shelley's use of this Prometheus as metamorphoser, creator, artist-craftsman. Like the Titan, Victor uses clay (the living having returned to dust) and shapes it into a living being. The being had returned to nothingness, and from nothing, he promotes it back to being, in an act that is above all scientific: imagination has joined forces with experimentation, equipping itself with new techniques, the scientist is the new Prometheus, dominating hero, master of the world. In this respect, Frankenstein raises questions that are still relevant today: science can destroy man, but it can also modify, use and manipulate him. The fact that this Prometheus poses the problem of his power implies, de facto, that alongside cognitive awareness, moral awareness must intervene to avoid not only the "ruin of the soul" (Note: François Rabelais, Pantagruel ("Science without conscience is but the ruin of the soul").) but also that of man himself.

=== Borrowings from John Milton and Samuel Taylor Coleridge ===
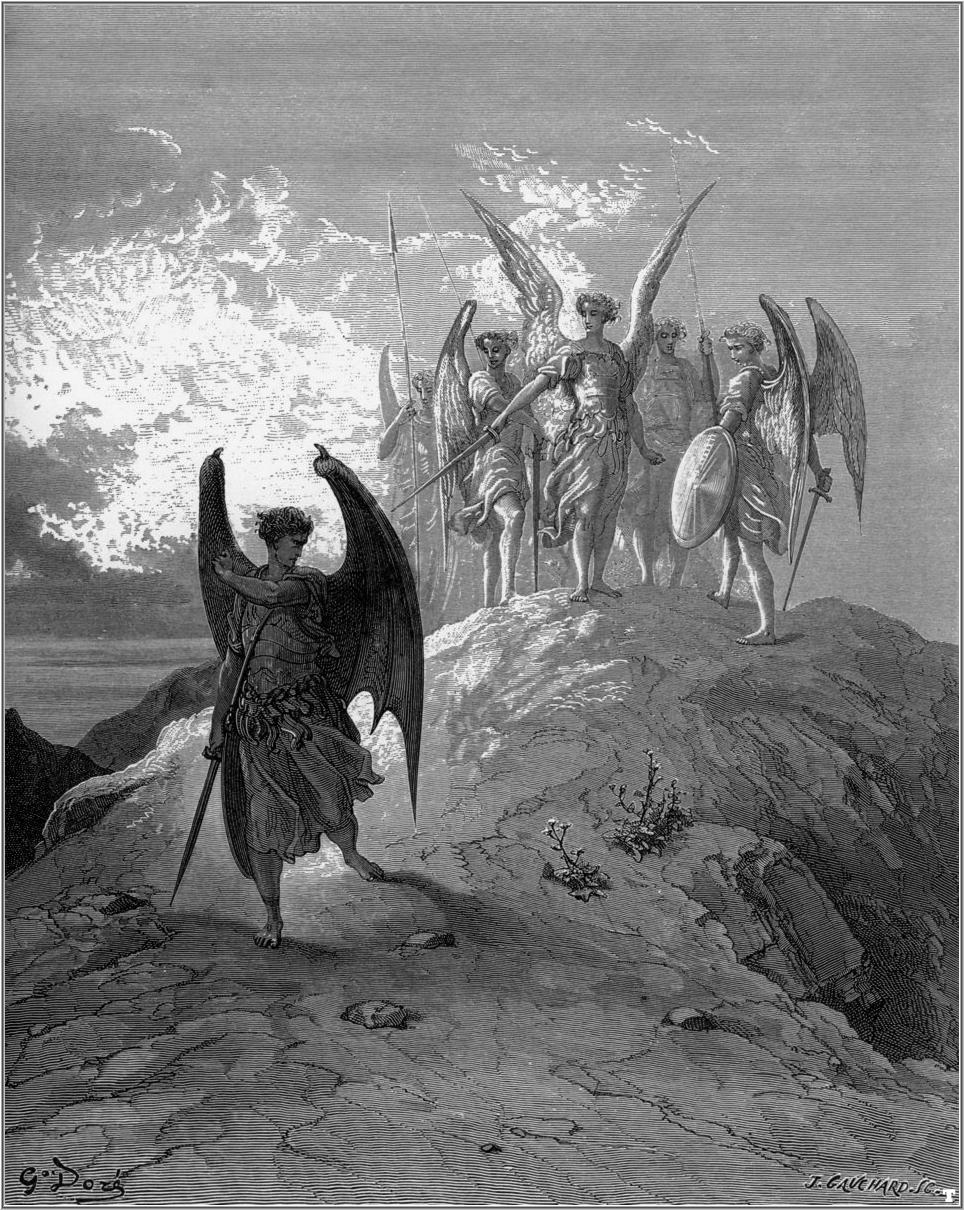
Satan expelled from Heaven, by Gustave Doré.

In addition to these two versions of the Prometheus myth, there are borrowings from Milton's Paradise Lost, often mentioned in the Shelleys' diaries, particularly when William Godwin published his work on the poet's nephews, and from Coleridge's poem The Rime of the Ancient Mariner.

Like Milton's Satan, Mary Shelley's modern Prometheus has rebelled against the divine order, that is, against God himself; like Milton's God, Victor abandons his creature; like Satan, Victor and his creature express their loneliness and despair; like Satan too, the monster suffers but does not submit, deciding in the end to choose Evil; like Milton's Adam, finally, he reproaches his creator for having taken him from the earth to make human clay. (Note: From John Milton's Paradise Lost: "Did I request thee, Maker, / From my clay. To mould Me man? Did I solicit thee. / From darkness to promote me?", X, 773-745, a quotation that appears in Frankenstein as an epigraph on the title page.)

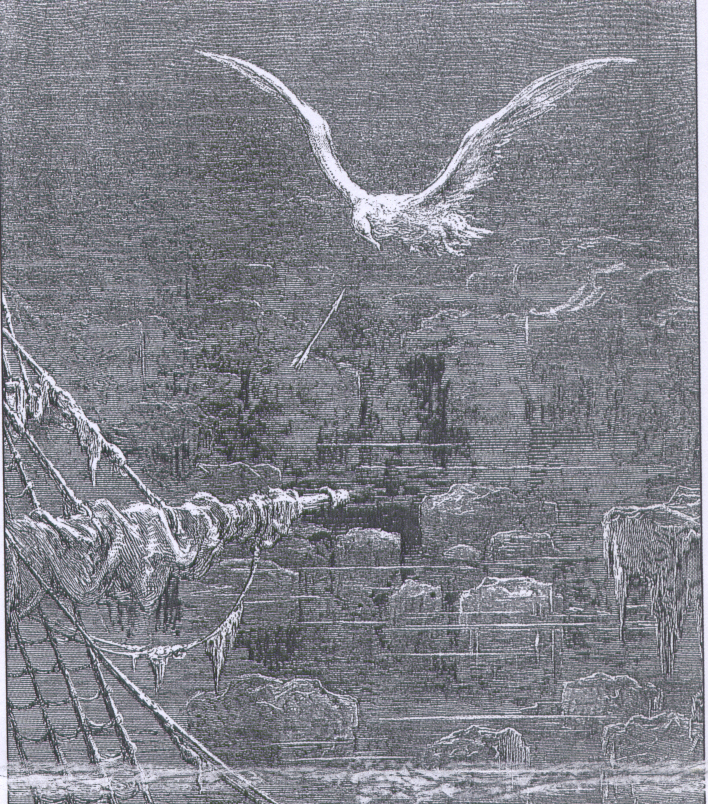
Illustration of Coleridge's poem by Gustave Doré.

Like Coleridge's sailor, Victor has destroyed the divine order and has remained abandoned by God, solitary, deprived of certainties, on icy continents in the image of the glaciation from which his soul suffers. However, he will not be saved: the exorcism of his story will not save him from physical death, the last avatar of the death of his being that occurred when he gave life to the monster; he would thus have placed his own life in a hideous body, because, since the application of the "instruments of life", he will not cease to decay before perishing altogether. Likewise, and in this respect similar to his creator, also abandoned by his god, the monster finds himself isolated in a universe whose harmony he perceives but cannot share. So he puts his body in unison with his soul and entrusts it to the inaccessible peaks and icy deserts that respond to the coldness of his heart, dragging along his pursuer, who is no longer sure whether he is hunter or game.

== Metaphysical, aesthetic and ethical aspects ==
=== Transgression ===
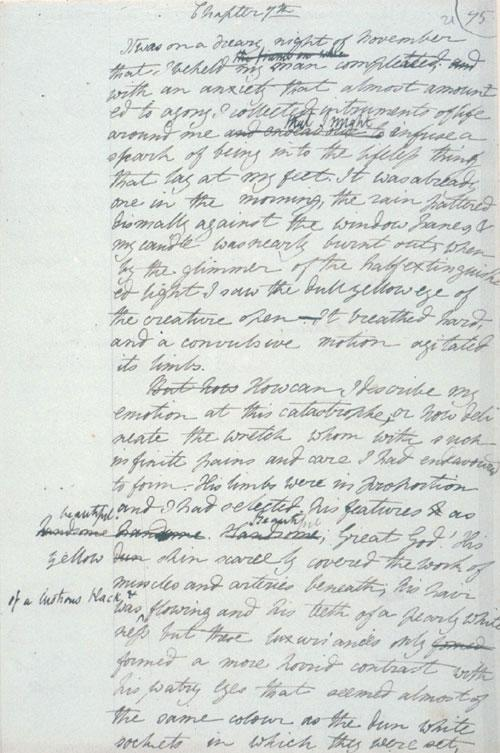
Frankenstein manuscript.

The narrative suggests a transgression, but never explicitly states it. The implied transgression involves creating a being with consciousness and sentience, especially in the act of giving it life. The vocabulary used by Victor, who is not Mary Shelley's spokesman, as he constructs his narrative by reorganizing his life and putting it into perspective based on what he has retained from it, including its weaknesses, emotional burdens, and character weight, is limited to a semantics of research and discovery. Therefore, he uses words like probe, penetrate, explore, and discover to describe the dynamics of his actions, and phrases like hidden recesses, deep secrets, unknown territories, and further knowledge to define the scope of his hard work. Very rarely, a verb like trespass is used to show that the work goes beyond contemporary normativity.

If there is any judgment on the author's part, it is in the unfolding of Frankenstein's creation of the monster and his subsequent psychological punishment, rather than being explicitly expressed by the narrator. Only the monster is led, like John Milton's Adam, to deplore the advent of an undesired life. Still, this is an existential misfortune that he endures, rather than an ontological refusal of accession to being.

==== Creation ====
The act of creating the monster itself is shown as fundamentally rooted in wrongness and impropriety. The monster's body is a human–animal hybrid of dead flesh from both. Admittedly, the creation process responds to the possibility of generating new life suggested by certain eighteenth-century scientists; however, there is a desacralization of the human being, a corruption of his integrity, and a defilement of his purity, all in light of contemporary Western Jewish and Christian theologies of humankind, its createdness, and its purpose. Shelley does not refer to it explicitly, but the sociocultural context of Frankenstein's creative action presupposes the monster's existence as an integral part of the collective consciousness. From the theological perspectives of normative Judaism and Christianity, a dead body can be resurrected only by the God who created it, for animals other than humans are not—according to the author of the book of Genesis—created in the image of God or with humankind's experientiality. At the beginning of the 19th century, the state of science rejected even the possibility of limits to scientific advancement; the story of Frankenstein is, therefore, an extreme example of human arrogance and a symbol of transgression.

==== The gift of life ====
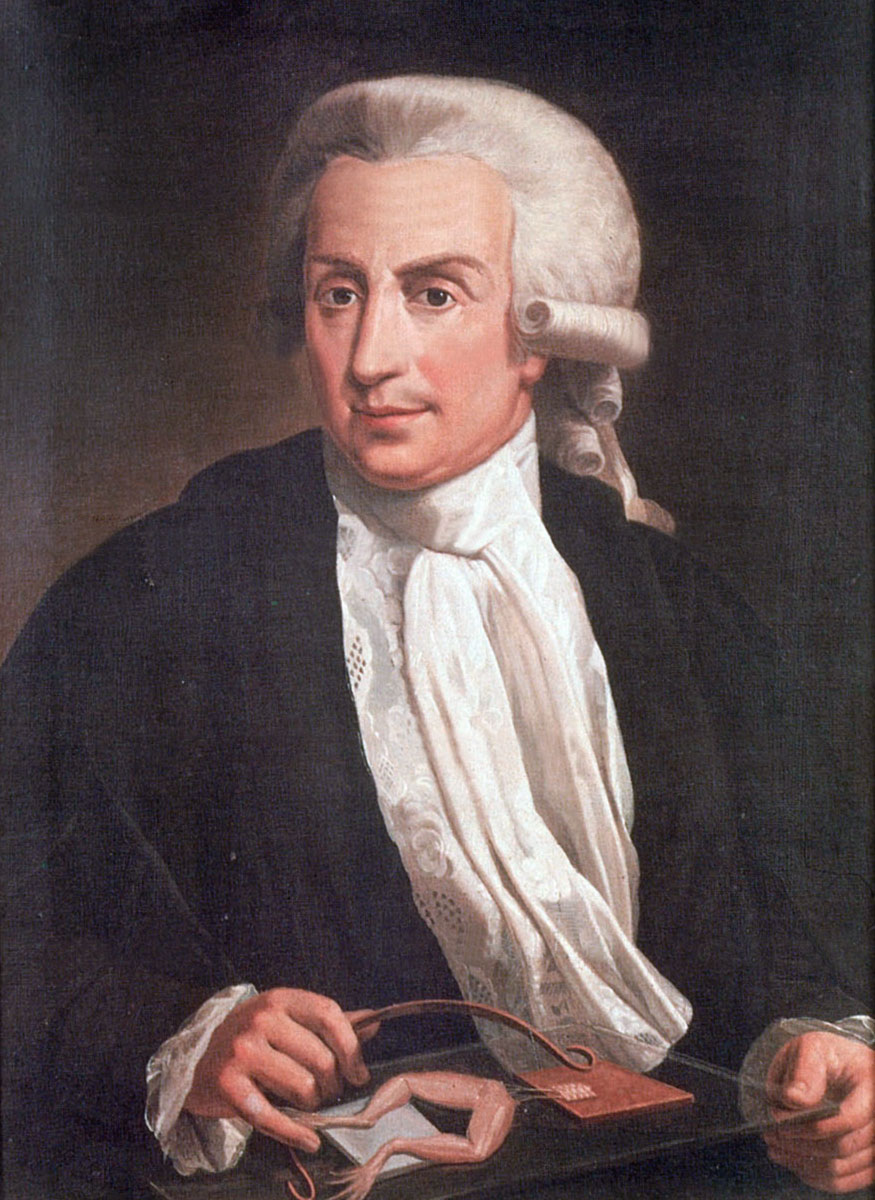
Portrait of Luigi Galvani (1737–1798)

Even when galvanized by electricity, the gift of life runs up against a fundamental impossibility: a creature's passage from complete non-existence to sentient existence, if not ensoulment. The monster does not remain in a vegetative state, but proves to be endowed with a cognitive and moral consciousness in every respect equal to that of man. As far as the species is concerned, apart from its aesthetic aspect, it is even superior to man, surpassing him in strength, mobility and agility. Without specifying to whom and to what the right to confer life belongs, Mary Shelley suggests that, in any case, it does not belong to man other than by natural transmission.

Frankenstein, through its title, its overt and covert quotations, its allusions and vocabulary borrowings, refers to the myth of Prometheus, and then to Paradise Lost, one can conclude that the order it presents is above all divine. The act of transgression thus appears as a usurpation of the sacred, the exclusive province of divinity. However, in both cases, the presupposed god is domineering, jealous of his prerogatives, vengeful even, Olympian Zeus (or Jupiter), perhaps the God of the Old Testament. The punishment will be extreme, in the image of the crime or sin: family, moral and physical destruction.

However, the constant reference to the major poetic texts of Mary Shelley's contemporaries and friends - Wordsworth, Coleridge and, of course, Byron and Shelley - and the direct allusions to works such as Tintern Abbey, Childe Harold's Pilgrimage and Mutability, which rest on a substratum of diffuse pantheism, would suggest that the divine order and the natural order merge. One of the functions of nature in Frankenstein is to suggest, if only on a sensory and perceptual level, the presence of transcendence - harmony in the Rhine valley, sovereign grandeur atop the Alpine peaks, infinity and eternity on the icy oceans.

=== The sublime ===
==== The sublime according to Burke ====
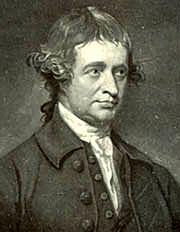
Edmund Burke.

As explained by Edmund Burke in 1757, it is based on astonishment, and to a lesser degree, admiration and reverence, all notions, in fact, by-products of terror (see, according to Burke, the Latin words stupeo or attonitus). (Note: Stupeo, Atonitus: I'm stunned, as if struck by thunder.) The ingredients are darkness and power.

A few quotations from Burke help to understand this aspect:

"Whatever is fitted in any sort to excite the ideas of pain and danger, that is to say, whatever is in any sort terrible, or is conversant about terrible objects, or operates in a manner analogous to terror, is a source of the sublime"

"Whatever […] is terrible, with regard to sight, is sublime too"

"Greatly night adds to our dread […] Almost all the heathen temples were dark […] The druids performed all the ceremonies in the bosom of the darkest woods {…} No person seems better to have understood the secret of heightening, or of setting terrible things, if I may use the expression, in their strongest light by the force of a judicious obscurity than Milton."

"To make any thing very terrible, obscurity seems in general to be necessary."

"I know of nothing sublime which is not some modification of power"

"[…] strength, violence, pain and terror, are ideas that rush in upon the mind together"

==== Mary Shelley's use of the sublime ====
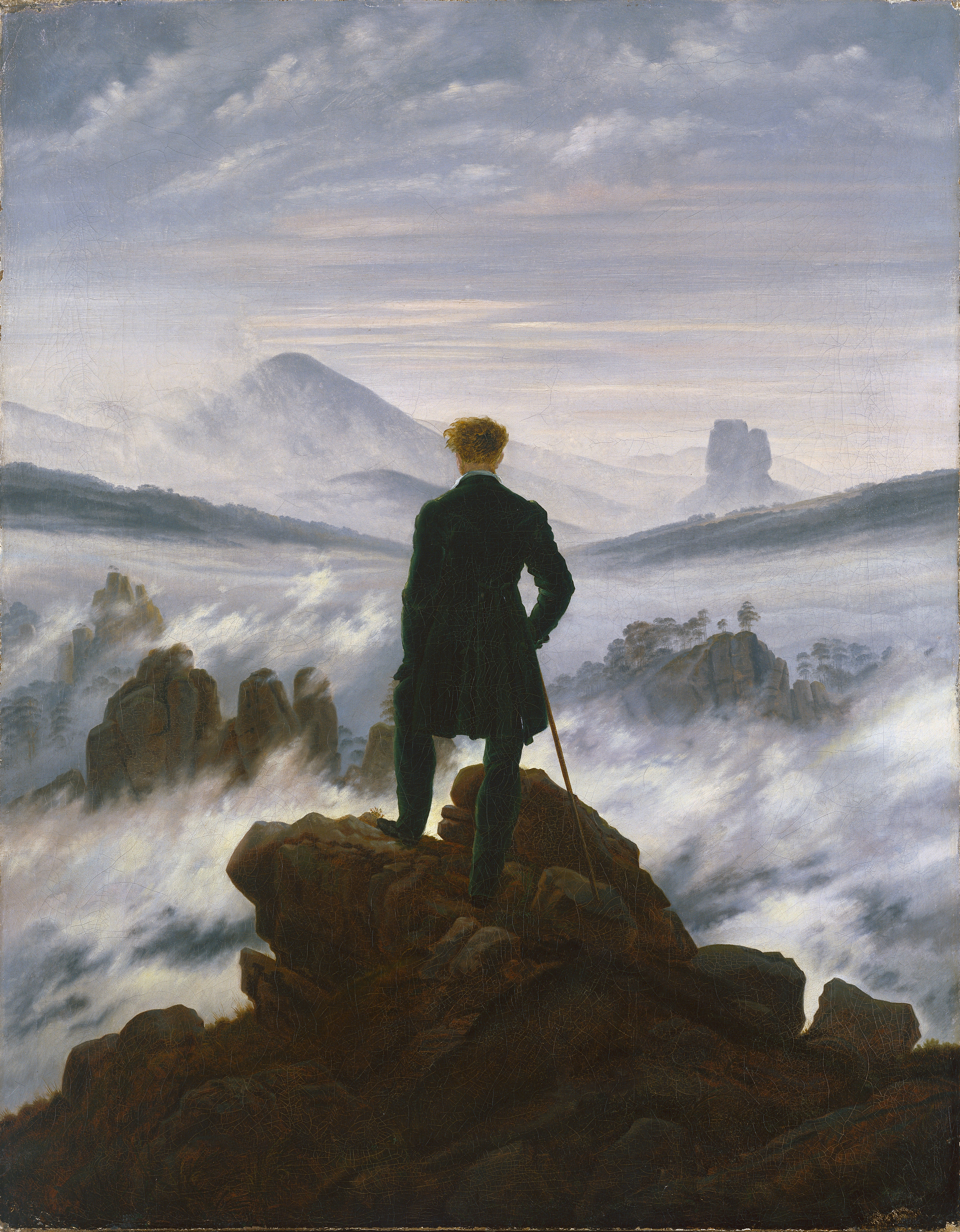
Wanderer above the Sea of Fog (1817) by Caspar David Friedrich.

Mary Shelley uses the ingredients analyzed or simply listed by Burke to associate Victor Frankenstein's transgression with the notion of the sublime, either to make him describe his states of mind, whether inhabited by torment or exaltation, or to create the illusion that landscapes impose notions of greatness and disquiet, elevation or unease (steep valleys, dark forests, etc.), or simply to arouse a gothic terror (or, in the first part, horror) in the reader. The monster, too, is sublime in its conception (obscurity, isolation), its size (out of the ordinary and frightening), the places it chooses and imposes on Victor (forests, peaks, valleys, abysses, vast deserts, tumultuous or frozen oceans), the unspeakable absoluteness of its solitude, the extremity of its feelings, the unpredictability of its character, its alliance with the elements (storms, glaciers, darkness, earth, water, fire).

For the sublime also lies within human beings. Like a natural landscape, the panorama of the soul arouses astonishment, admiration and respect, or else, by opposition or default, sinks into ridicule (ludicrous, according to Burke). Soon, the inner landscape becomes nocturnal, on the edge of consciousness, a dark, convulsive, spasmodic turmoil; through a play of mirrors reminiscent of the nested, reflective structure, the monster to which Victor has nevertheless given life becomes the very projection of his death wish. The transgression has been placed under the sign of Thanatos: the monster is the negative double of his creator, his evil Doppelgänger who carries out the death sentence unconsciously pronounced by Victor on his family, his friend, his wife, whom he believes he adores but whom he has experienced as castrating, suffocating him with love, protection, moral comfort and social certainties.

The being torn apart by suffering is also a divided being, in turn and at the same time creator and destroyer, provider of life and death, hunter and prey, executioner and victim. The abject monster turns out to be sublime, and the creator thought to be sublime turns out to be abject. This necessarily leads to an escape: the escape of the characters, who find each other only to lose each other, the escape of Victor, then of the monster, the pursuit of one by the other, then of the other by the one, quests as ardent as they are senseless, Walton's, Victor's ("ardour that exceeded moderation"), the monster's ("dream of bliss that cannot be realized"), leading to nothingness. Walton fails to reach the continent of happiness; Victor destroys his loved ones by procuration before destroying himself; the monster immolates himself with the fire that promoted him to being. The quest remains nothing more than a sterile, frozen quest; the fruits have not "kept the promise of the flowers". (Note: Allusion to Malherbe, Stances, "Prière pour le roi Henri le Grand, allant en Limozin", stanza 14.)

=== Morality ===
The story is never told by a heterodiegetic narrator. Successive layers of first-person narration are superimposed by the echoes left in the various listeners and the reader. None of the three narrators is Mary Shelley's spokesperson, at least not unreservedly. She entrusts each with words, and therefore character traits, principles, actions, feelings and emotions that she seems to approve of, and others that she rejects. The good and the not-so-good, the evil and the not-so-evil are all mixed up to varying degrees, and the author uses a range of devices, albeit rather limited and rather stereotyped, to let her degree of sympathy, aversion or amused contempt shine through. At times, she approaches the narrators - who are never protagonists in the raw, since all actions belong to the past and are filtered through a network of successive consciousnesses - only to distance herself from them in a constant game of hide-and-seek, swaying to the whim of her irony.

This explains why the author sometimes seems to move toward Walton's romantic enthusiasm, or even Frankenstein's, and at other times seems completely detached from it.

==== A paroxysmal oscillation ====
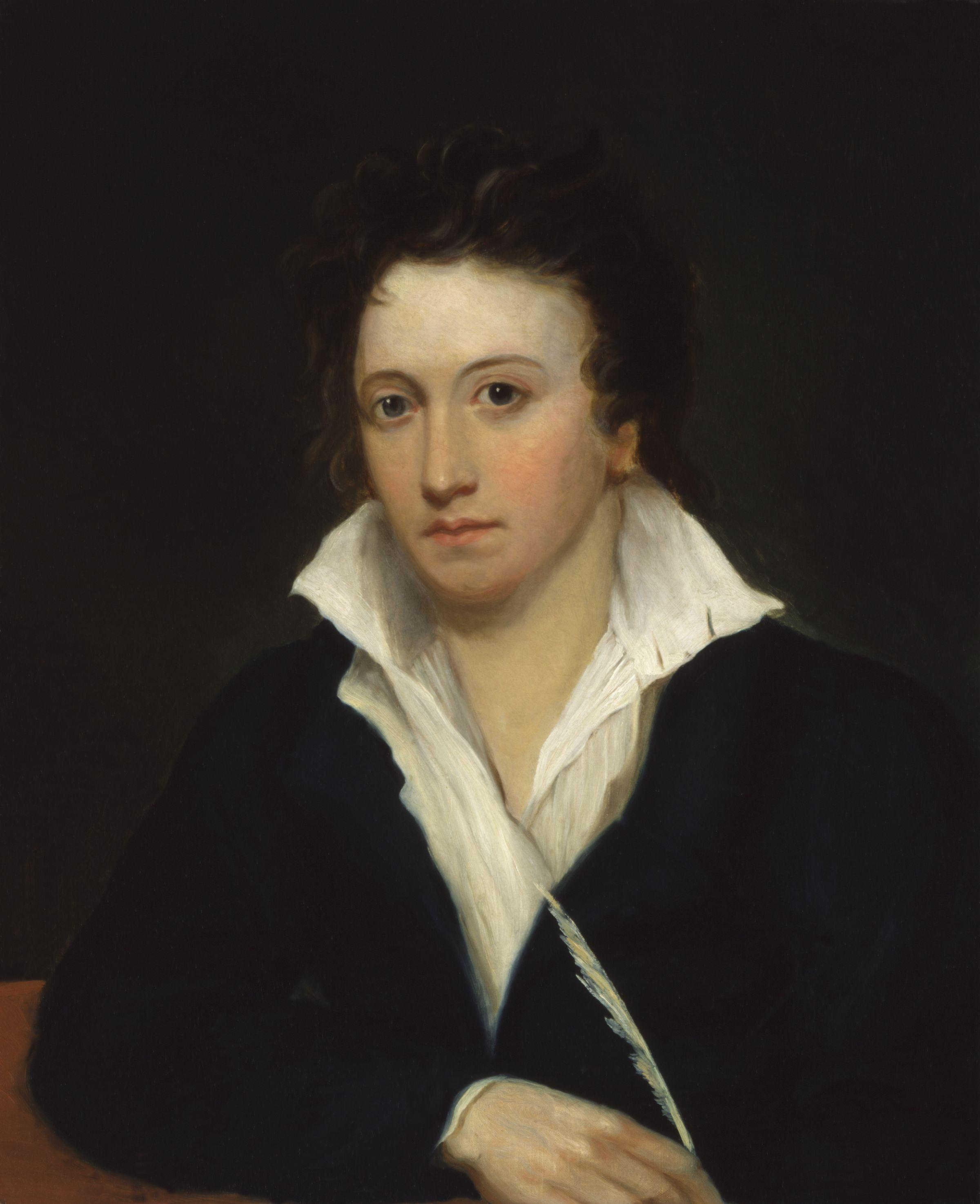
Percy Bysshe Shelley, by Alfred Clint, based on Amelia Curran.

Throughout the novel, this character's oscillation between euphoria and prostration is pushed to the extreme. Admittedly, this is a somewhat stark representation of the romantic hero. However, through the repetition of attacks and crises, the portrait of a bipolar character gradually emerges. Indeed, as far as we know, and despite the tumultuous effervescence of her household, Mary cultivated the memory of her husband and was concerned with his work, but in a way that erased much of its radicalism. She always sought to establish a compromise between her fidelity and her condition as a woman, the offspring of a famous family, the widow of a poet. Though a woman evolving in a non-conformist medium, her society saw her as a woman all the same.

This is how the reader could be taken in by Victor Frankenstein's contradictory statements, and find in them a vacillating ambiguity of Mary Shelley's ethical conceptions. His acts of contrition are easily contrasted, as displayed at the beginning of his story, with, for example, the fiery heroic-comic speech he addresses to Walton's sailors, in which he enjoins upon them the firmness of a grand design and the duty of heroism. The exhortation is peppered with ironic nods to William Shakespeare, including the young Henry V's speech to his soldiers, St Crispin's Day, and a disguised quotation from The Tempest in the line "This is not made of such stuff as your hearts may be", parodying the lines "We are such stuff / As dreams are made on, and our little life. Is rounded with a sleep", spoken by Prospero. Then he's framed by bouts of deep despondency (sunk in languor); only Walton, captivated by the character, falls under his spell: "a voice so modulated", "an eye so full of lofty design and heroism".

==== A response through action ====
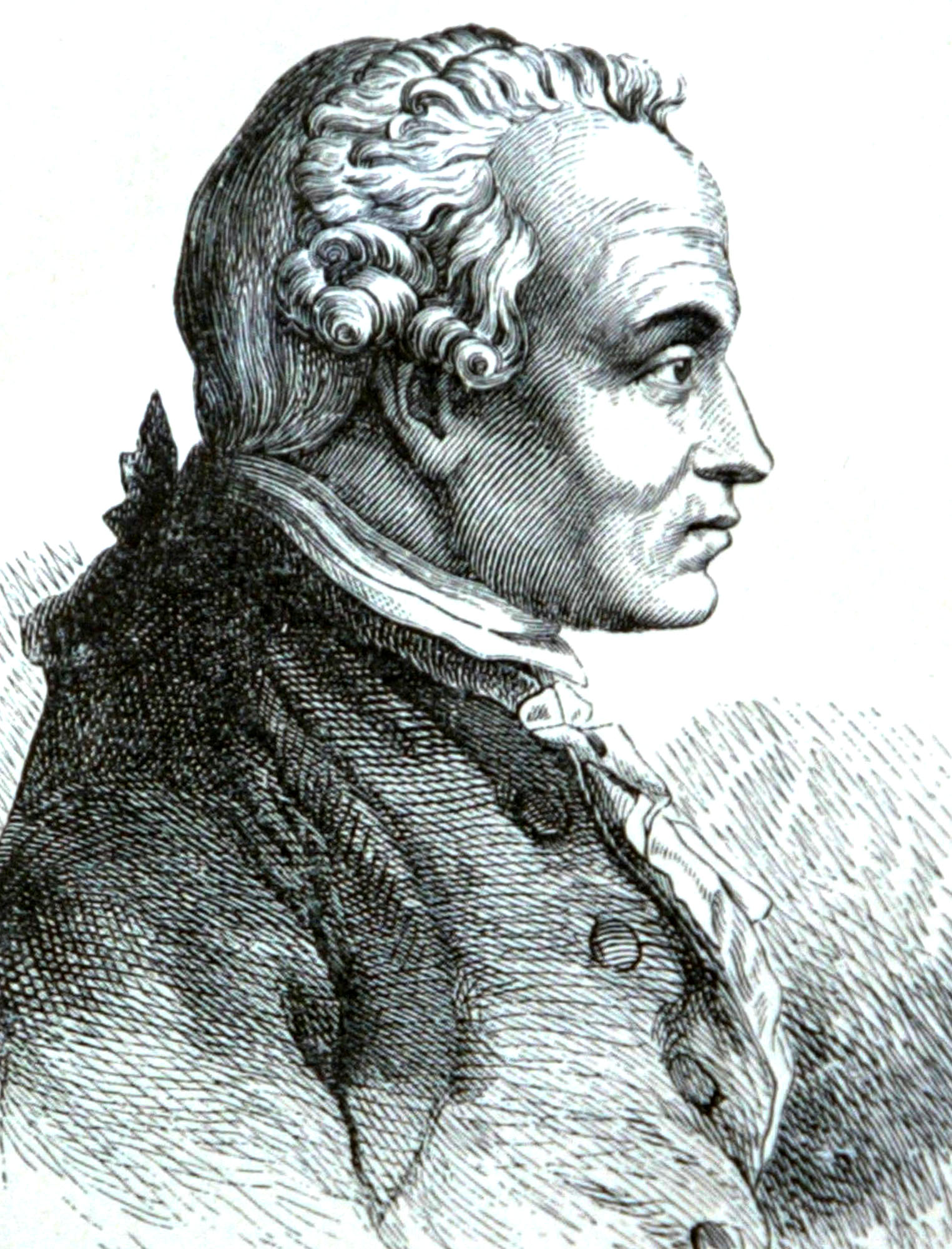
Immanuel Kant.

Mary Shelley's response to Frankenstein's transgression is to be found in the very unfolding of the action. Frankenstein is, among other things, a matter of crime and punishment, the systematic destruction of his family's relational and moral fabric, the disintegration of his being through isolation, guilt, inner torture and, ultimately, the extinction of life. So to claim that the enterprise itself is not reprehensible is a sophism: the tragic personal consequences, the upheaval of institutions, the absurd operation of justice, which condemns on the basis of appearances, are the result of flawed premises. The quest was evil, and the Grail a poisoned chalice.

Insofar as the higher moral instance cannot be identified, since in many ways Frankenstein's world is a world without God, it is appropriate to use the vocabulary of Kant's Critique of Practical Reason, known and appreciated by Coleridge, published in 1787, and simply evoke the presence of a categorical imperative. Here, the moral law exists, but one cannot know its origin, imposing itself rather than imposing it, and certainly not revealing it; it is: in his inspired but irresponsible adolescent dream, Victor has consciously set it aside, and in the process, peace, happiness and life itself have slipped away from him. Nature is fragile, Mary Shelley seems to be saying, and cannot be desecrated with impunity: as Wordsworth wrote at the end of Nutting: "[...] with gentle hand, touch/ For there is a spirit in the wood".

== An ontological crime ==
Frankenstein's Promethean dimension covers almost every aspect of the text, whether purely literary, philosophical or moral. The psychological singularity of the characters, especially Victor, exists, but is far from fundamental. Indeed, the very subtitle of the novel immediately places Frankenstein outside human norms. Whatever his affinities with the Romantic hero whose silhouette emerges at the end of the 18th century and finds its plenitude in the first decades of the 19th century, he belongs, in his conception and in the represented projection of this conception, to myth and the imaginary. Nor, like other characters, is he reduced to a single constant, quickly becoming what E. M. Forster has called a round character, full of substance.

His antecedents are legends, doctrines and literary works.

Mary Shelley's prophetic intuition is to be commended, as she inserts herself into a Gothic tradition that is almost on the wane, renewing the genre but, above all, forcing it to pose one of mankind's major problems - that of its own limits. As technology continues to evolve much faster than morality, the duty of the human community, she shows, is to define and set the methods and constraints necessary to ensure that the boundaries of the possible remain unbroken. In fact, Victor's transgression was a crime against humanity and, beyond that, against the Being itself: it was an ontological crime.

The modern reader, like Mary Shelley's contemporary, cannot but endorse the opinion expressed by Percy Bysshe Shelley about his wife's book:

We debate with ourselves in wonder, as we read it, what could have been the series of thoughts -- what could have been the peculiar experiences that awakened them -- which conduced, in the author's mind, to the astonishing combinations of motives and incidents, and the startling catastrophe, which comprise this tale . . . The elementary feelings of a human mind are exposed to view, and those who are accustomed to reason deeply on their origin and tendency will, perhaps, be the only persons who can sympathize, to the full extent, in the interest of the actions which are their result

== In other media ==
=== Books ===
Besides the original novel, the character also appears or is mentioned in other books from pastiches to parodies.

- In the book Frankenstein's Aunt, the Baron's aunt comes to Frankenstein's castle to put it back in order, following the chaos caused by her nephew's experiments. In the novel Frankenstein's Aunt Returns, Frankenstein has created a child for the monster and his bride.
- In Dean Koontz's Frankenstein, Victor Frankenstein – now going by the alias of Victor Helios – has survived into the present, now living in New Orleans while arranging for the creation of his 'New Race' of humanity, now growing his creations in tanks after acquiring funding from the likes of Adolf Hitler, Joseph Stalin and Fidel Castro over the centuries. His creations are mentally and emotionally defective, however, and Helios is forced to kill them, all while convinced that it is due to a flaw in his process rather than being able to acknowledge that his own warped views are the reasons his creations break down due to the hopelessness of their lives and inability to find their own purpose. He is opposed in his 'quest' by his original creation – now called Deucalion, who has mastered the ability to teleport due to the unique circumstances of his creation – and two New Orleans detectives.
- In Kenneth Oppel's novel This Dark Endeavor and its sequel Such Wicked Intent, Frankenstein is portrayed as a 16-year-old aspiring scientist who creates his own creature from the body of his deceased twin brother, Konrad.
- In Peter Ackroyd's novel, The Casebook of Victor Frankenstein, as the protagonist begins conducting anatomical experiments to reanimate the dead, he at first uses corpses supplied by the coroner. But these specimens prove imperfect for Victor's purposes. Moving his makeshift laboratory to a deserted pottery factory in Limehouse, he makes contact with the Doomsday men – the resurrectionists – whose grisly methods put Frankenstein in great danger as he works feverishly to bring life to the terrifying creature that will bear his name for eternity.
- In the 2001 Curtis Jobling book, Frankenstein's Cat, it features Frankenstein, sometime before creating his monster, creating a cat called Nine (named because he was made out of nine cats). This book was later adapted into a television series in 2007.

=== Film ===
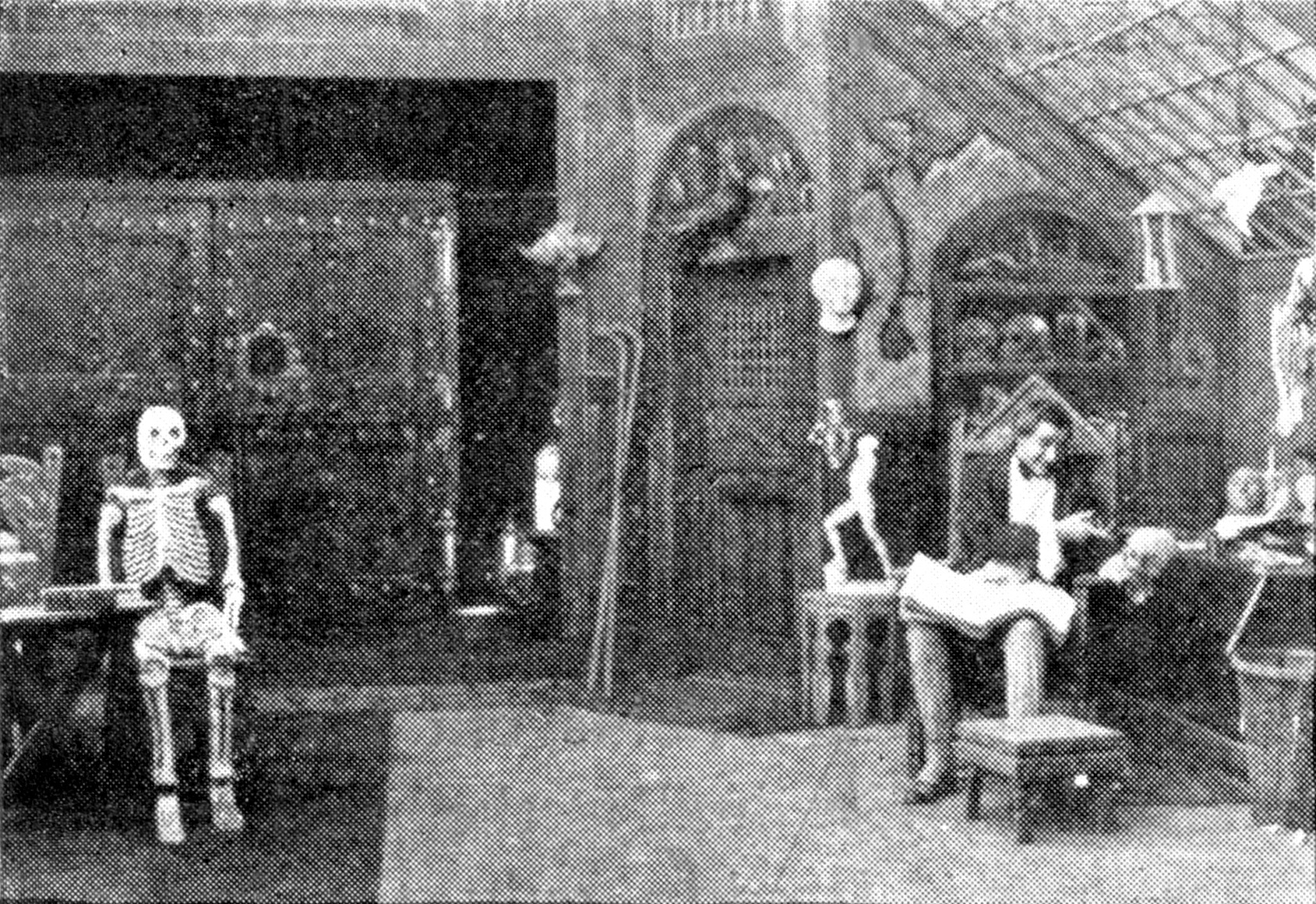
Victor Frankenstein (1910 film)

- Victor Frankenstein's first appearance on screen was in a 1910 film (produced by Thomas Edison) in which he seemed more of a magician.
- The character's first significant film appearance was in Universal Pictures' 1931 film adaptation, directed by James Whale. Here, the character is renamed Henry Frankenstein (a later film shows his tombstone bearing the name Heinrich von Frankenstein) and is played by British actor Colin Clive opposite Boris Karloff as the monster. Clive reprised his role in the 1935 sequel, Bride of Frankenstein, which reunited Clive, Whale and Karloff, as well as first giving Frankenstein the official title of Baron. Although the character is not present in the following sequels due to Clive's death in 1937, an oil painting of Frankenstein (as portrayed by Clive) appears in 1939's Son of Frankenstein; he is also the title character, in spite of having only a cameo, in The Ghost of Frankenstein (1942), where his ghost is portrayed by Cedric Hardwicke (who also plays Henry's son Ludwig Frankenstein in the film).

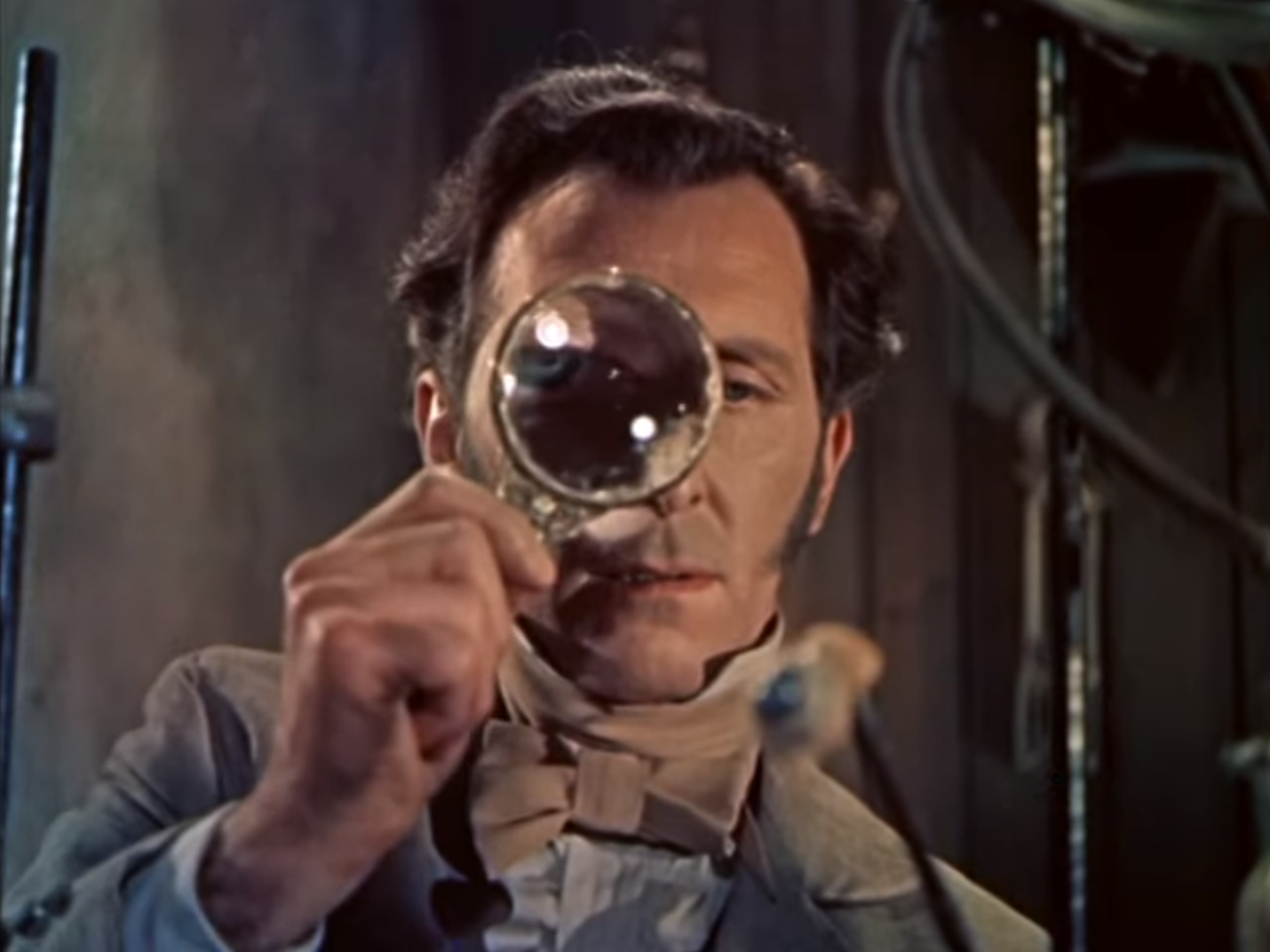
Frankenstein played by Peter Cushing in The Curse of Frankenstein (1957)

- The character gained new life in 1957 when Peter Cushing first essayed the role in Hammer Films' The Curse of Frankenstein, opposite Christopher Lee as the Creature. Cushing went on to star as Victor Frankenstein, identified as a Baron, in five more films for the studio, with each subsequent movie in the series uncovering different aspects of the character; for example, in 1958's The Revenge of Frankenstein he shows genuine concern for the patients of the poor hospital he controls, in contrast to the Baron as portrayed in Frankenstein Must Be Destroyed (1969), where Cushing is a ruthless megalomaniac who utilises blackmail, rape and murder to terrorise those around him.
- The 1958 film Frankenstein 1970 features a Victor Frakenstein (portrayed by Boris Karloff) who is the descendant of Richard Freiherr von Frankenstein I (who lived from 1702-1961). It was established that he was disfigured by the Nazi Party for not being of any help to them that left him with a scar going from his seemingly useless left eye to his lip, a limp, and an unexplained older appearance despite being the same age as the financier William Gottfried. Upon renting his family's castle to a TV crew making a movie of Frankenstein's monster, Victor gets the money to purchase an atomic reactor to bring his own monster to life using different body parts.
- The 1967 film Mad Monster Party? featured Baron Boris von Frankenstein (voiced by Boris Karloff) who is based on Victor Frankenstein and has his Monster and the Monster's more intelligent mate living with him on the island of Evil. In addition, Boris is served by his female assistant Francsca, his zombie Butler Yetch, his chef Mafia Machiavelli, and assorted zombie servants. Boris discovers the secret to total destruction after testing it on a raven and plans to reveal it to the Worldwide Organization of Monsters while announcing his retirement after sending invitations to Count Dracula, the Mummy, the Hunchback of Notre Dame, the Werewolf, the Invisible Man, Dr. Jekyll and Mr. Hyde, and the Creature while not having an invitation sent to "It" (a giant ape-like monster and knock-off of King Kong) after it was a bore last time. He has a nephew named Felix Flanken whom he claims is the son of his youngest sister (an expert in witchcraft) and a medicine man, though the film's twist ending reveals him to actually be a sentient automaton built by Boris after he sacrificed his life to drop the secret to total destruction on the Isle of Evil.
- After Cushing temporarily retired from the role following 1969's Frankenstein Must Be Destroyed, Hammer decided to reboot the series for the 1970s. The Horror of Frankenstein was a tongue-in-cheek black comedy remake of The Curse of Frankenstein, which featured Ralph Bates as a younger, "hipper" Baron in the sinister mold of Cushing's interpretation. After the film failed to be the success Hammer had hoped for, they brought Cushing back for one final film, in 1974's Frankenstein and the Monster from Hell.
- The 1972 TV film Mad Mad Mad Monsters (a "prequel of sorts" to Mad Monster Party?) featured Baron Henry von Frankenstein (voiced by Bob McFadden impersonating Boris Karloff). In the TV film, Henry and his assistant Igor construct and bring to life a female monster, intended to be the original creature's bride. Frankenstein goes to the Transylvania Astoria Hotel in order to make the wedding arrangements while inviting Count Dracula, Count Dracula's son Boobula, Boobula's pet black cat, Ron Chanley the Werewolf, the Mummy, the Creature, Claude the Invisible Man, Claude's wife Nagatha, Claude's son Ghoul, and Claude's pet invisible dog Goblin to the wedding.
- Udo Kier played Baron Victor Frankenstein in 1973's Flesh for Frankenstein. This version of the character is a serial killer who is married to his own sister.
- Leonard Whiting played Victor Frankenstein in Frankenstein: The True Story (1973).
- Robert Foxworth played Victor Frankenstein in a 1973 television adaptation Frankenstein.
- In Mel Brooks' 1974 comedy Young Frankenstein, Gene Wilder portrays Frederick Frankenstein, grandson of Victor Frankenstein (voiced by Mel Brooks), who inherits the family estate, but is ashamed of his grandfather's work (to the point of insisting that his name is pronounced "Fronk-en-steen"). He is ultimately inspired to take up the work, eventually creating his own monster (portrayed by Peter Boyle).
- Barrett Oliver portrays a young version of Victor Frankenstein in 1984 short film Frankenweenie, directed by Tim Burton. Charlie Tahan plays Victor in the 2012 animated remake.
- Sting appeared as "Charles" Frankenstein in 1985's The Bride opposite Clancy Brown as the monster.
- Raul Julia portrayed Frankenstein in Roger Corman's Frankenstein Unbound (1990) based on the Brian Aldiss novel.
- In 1992, a TV film adaptation of Frankenstein was produced by David Wickes for Turner Pictures. It starred Patrick Bergin as Victor and Randy Quaid as the monster. In this film, Victor clones himself instead of creating the creature from the dead. In this adaptation, Victor and the monster share a psychic link, and can sense each other's presence.
- Kenneth Branagh reinterpreted the character along the lines of Shelley's portrayal in Mary Shelley's Frankenstein (1994) opposite Robert De Niro as the monster.
- In the 1999 animated film Alvin and the Chipmunks Meet Frankenstein, an unidentified Dr Frankenstein is the main antagonist voiced by Michael Bell.
- In the 2004 film Van Helsing, Victor Frankenstein (portrayed by Samuel West) is hired by Count Dracula to create the monster for Dracula to use to bring his offspring to life. When Frankenstein refuses, Dracula kills him only to be attacked by the monster. The monster takes Frankenstein's body to the windmill, but an angry mob outside of the castle sees the monster and chases it to the windmill. They set fire to the windmill in order to kill the monster, but are chased off by Dracula and his brides. The monster survives when the floor on top of the windmill caves in. The monster – which refers to Frankenstein as his/its father – is later used to bring Dracula's offspring to life only to escape from the castle with help from monster hunter Gabriel Van Helsing.
- The 2004 independent movie Frankenstein features a Victor Frankenstein known as Victor Helios (portrayed by Thomas Kretschmann), who has used his own research to extend his life into the modern day, where he continues his experiments to create life with the goal of replacing humanity with his own creatures. He is opposed by his original creation, who is determined to defeat his creator while being hampered by a mental 'block' Helios has installed in all his creatures to prevent them from harming him.
- The 2004 Hallmark TV production of Frankenstein starred Alec Newman as Victor Frankenstein opposite of Luke Goss as the monster.
- The 2007 film Frankenstein introduces Victoria Frankenstein. Instead of making the creature out of corpses, she uses stem cells, intending to use her experiment to save her dying son. The experiment goes wrong, however, and the creature escapes. When Frankenstein catches up with the monster, she comes to love it because it is her only remaining link to her son who has since died.
- Victor Frankenstein briefly appears in the 2014 film I, Frankenstein, in which he is played by Aden Young.
- Victor Frankenstein was portrayed by James McAvoy in the 2015 film Victor Frankenstein. In this version, he rescues Igor (Daniel Radcliffe) – formerly an unnamed hunchback from a circus who impressed Victor with his exceptional self-taught medical skills – to enlist him as his partner in creating life, later attributing his desire as a means of making up for a childhood incident where his elder brother died in a blizzard. Although Victor acknowledges that his first human creation has no true spark of life in it, the film concludes with him speculating how he shall improve on his project in the future.
- The 2024 film Monster Mash features a variant of Dr. Victor Frankenstein (portrayed by Michael Madsen) who plans to create the ultimate monster by having his Frankenstein monster Boris capture Count Dracula's daughter Elisabeta in order to obtain Count Dracula's vampire blood, the heart of the mummy Ramses the Third, and a piece of skin from Hawley Griffin the Invisible Man. After having obtained the arms and legs of the werewolf Charlie Conliff (who regrew his limbs due to his werewolf nature) for his ultimate monster from Boris, Dr. Frankenstein finally gets Count Dracula's blood in exchange for Elisabeta's safety as Dr. Frankenstein mentions that he is dying. When he is stabbed by Elisabeta, Dr. Frankenstein manages to place his consciousness into the hybrid monster's body that resembled a towering hairless werewolf. With Boris on their side, the monsters work together to slay Dr. Frankenstein's hybrid body. The post-credits shows Dr. Frankenstein's hand moving again as he gives a toast to "a new era of gods and monsters".
- Victor Frankenstein is portrayed by Oscar Isaac in the 2025 Netflix film Frankenstein that is directed by Guillermo del Toro. Unlike the book, Victor's brother William grows up to adulthood with him. In addition, he later sported a prosthetic left leg following an accident when he was planning to burn the tower down with his Creature still inside. His pursuit of the creature occurs after Elizabeth was caught in the crossfire and William was among those fatally wounded by the Creature. Both Victor and the Creature reconciled in Victor's final moments.

=== Television ===
- In the 1952 Frankenstein episode in the TV series Tales of Tomorrow Victor Frankenstein was portrayed by John Newland.
- In the series The Famous Adventures of Mr. Magoo, an episode titled "Doctor Frankenstein" relates the story of Victor Frankenstein and the monster he created. This episode aired on March 13, 1965.
- Victor Frankenstein is mentioned as the creator of Herman Munster in The Munsters, but does not appear in the series. At Herman and Lily's wedding, Frankenstein gave Herman away "with his blueprints." He is currently dead. In "A Visit from Johann", the episode introduced the great-great-grandson of Victor Frankenstein named Victor Frankenstein IV (portrayed by John Abbott).
- In Carry On Christmas (1969), which was one of the Carry On Christmas Specials on TV, there is a sketch spoofing the Frankenstein story. Terry Scott portrays Frankenstein and Bernard Bresslaw portrays the monster.
- In The World's Greatest Super Friends episode "The Super Friends Meet Frankenstein", the Dr. Frankenstein (voiced by Stanley Ralph Ross) that is featured is depicted as the great-great-grandson of the original Dr. Frankenstein who carries on the "family tradition" of creating monsters. He is assisted by an Igor-like henchman named Gore (voiced by Michael Bell). While Dr. Frankenstein makes use of a variant of his great-great-grandfather's creation, he did create a tar monster loaded with Kryptonite to capture Superman and Wonder Woman. With the imprisoned Batman, Dr. Frankenstein made a super-monster that had the powers and abilities of Superman, Wonder Woman, and Batman. With help from another scientist, Robin sported the same powers and used a lead suit to weaken it with Kryptonite. After the super-monster was depowered with Superman, Wonder Woman, and Batman regaining their respectful abilities, Dr. Frankenstein and Gore are apprehended by the Super Friends.
- Victor Frankenstein appears in The Transformers episode "Autobot Spike", voiced by Frank Welker. The Autobots see him in a Frankenstein movie.
- In an episode of Star Trek: The Next Generation titled "Evolution", Guinan alludes that she knew Dr. Frankenstein when she tells Wesley Crusher that his dangerous nanite experiment might become similar to the experiments that Dr. Frankenstein did.
- The cartoon series Toonsylvania features Dr. Vic Frankenstein (voiced by David Warner) who is served by Igor and his Frankenstein's monster-like creation Phil.
- The humorous TV series Frankenstein's Aunt features a Dr. Frankenstein who creates a typical Frankenstein's monster. As in the Universal Pictures' 1931 film adaptation, the character is renamed Henry Frankenstein (portrayed by Bolek Polívka).
- In ABC's fairy tale drama series Once Upon a Time, Victor Frankenstein (portrayed by David Anders), originally from a fictional German-themed world called the Land Without Color, is one of many characters brought to the Storybrooke by the Evil Queen under the alias Dr. Whale (named for director James Whale) and serves as a recurring character throughout the show's run. He is a doctor who works at the local hospital and was responsible for creating the show's version of the monster when he tries to resurrect his dead brother Gerhardt.
- The Adult Swim animated series Mary Shelley's Frankenhole features Dr. Victor Frankenstein (voiced by Jeff B. Davis) and other characters from both the novel Frankenstein and other classic horror films. Frankenstein is depicted as being a narcissist who, after drinking an immortality serum he invented, has lived for more than a thousand years. He has developed the technology to connect his village to various points in time, called Frankenholes, that allow various people from history to time travel to visit him in the hopes he will do some sort of miraculous surgery to fix physical and mental flaws.
- The 2014 Showtime series Penny Dreadful depicts Dr. Victor Frankenstein (portrayed by Harry Treadaway) as a young morgue worker in England during the late 1800s. He creates his monster Caliban (portrayed by Rory Kinnear) by attaching a cadaver to a system of circuits and running electricity through it during a lightning storm. Unlike other adaptions, Victor creates two more creations: Proteus and Lily.
- Supernatural season 10 featured the descendants of Victor Frankenstein who changed their last name to Styne after Mary Shelley's infamous book exposed the family's experiments. The modern day descendants are scattered across the world. The American branch of the Frankenstein family is led by Monroe Frankenstein (portrayed by Marcus Flanagan) and consist of his sons Elden Frankenstein (portrayed by David Hoflin), Jacob Frankenstein (portrayed by Jeff Branson), and an unwilling Cyrus Frankenstein (portrayed by Connor Price), his nephew Eli Frankenstein (portrayed by Matt Bellefleur), and his unspecified relative Roscoe Frankenstein (portrayed by Josh Emerson). The Stynes sport a hybrid of magical knowledge and surgical enhancements. The American branch was later wiped out by Dean Winchester who avenged the death of Charlie Bradbury.

=== Theatre ===
- The 2007 Off-Broadway musical, Frankenstein – A New Musical portrays Victor Frankenstein as the naïve young student of Mary Shelley's original novel.
- In 2007, Young Frankenstein by Mel Brooks and Thomas Meehan premiered on Broadway based on the 1974 comedy film of the same name. The plot remains mostly unchanged from the movie version.
- In 2011 the stage adaptation Frankenstein (by Nick Dear) directed by Oscar winner Danny Boyle premiered at the Royal National Theatre in London, starring Benedict Cumberbatch and Jonny Lee Miller, who swapped the roles of Frankenstein and his creature at his representation. The play won numerous awards and massive acclaim from critics and audiences, was recorded live twice to capture both sets of performance, and has been broadcast to cinemas around the world as a part of the National Theatre Live programme.
- Also in 2011, a unique, musical adaptation called Frankenstein's Wedding: Live in Leeds was performed in front of a group of 12,000 at the Kirkstall Abbey. It incorporated footage, filmed prior to the performance, focusing mostly on Frankenstein (played by Andrew Gower) and his creation of the creature, with the live show focusing mainly on Frankenstein's wedding to Liz (played by Lacey Turner), and the tragic story that follows. The show also starred Mark Williams as Alphonse Frankenstein, and David Harewood as The Creature. The show was broadcast live on BBC Three on 9 March.

=== Computer and video games ===
- Dr. Frankenstein appears in the 1995 graphic adventure computer game Frankenstein: Through the Eyes of the Monster portrayed by Tim Curry in live-action footage that is integrated into the gameplay graphics. He was the one who brought a scientist named Phillip Werren back to life as a Frankenstein monster.
- Victor Frankenstein's in-universe analog or ancestor "Friedrich von Frankenstein" is mentioned multiple times throughout Castlevania: Lords of Shadow's main story. Before he died, the Vampire Lord Carmilla had promised to make him suffer for his creations and had carried it out after becoming undead. One of his creations appears as a boss, but unlike the monster, it's a metallic, scorpion-like creature that has no hint of humanity but a large amount of durability. In the first DLC expansion of the main story you find Friedrich's decayed fingers in jars spread out in the Vampire Lord's castle, although you can only find 6 of them.
- Victor Frankenstein is one of the main characters of the Japanese otome game Code: Realize ~Guardian of Rebirth~ and its sequels (Code: Realize ~Future Blessings~ & Code: Realize ~Wintertide Miracles~).
- It is implied in the Japanese games Devil Summoner: Raidou Kuzunoha vs the Soulless Army (2006) and Devil Summoner 2: Raidou Kuzunoha vs King Abaddon (2008) that the contact Victor is in fact Victor Frankenstein; he mentions being exiled from his homeland and his main purpose in the game is to use "mad science" to fuse your demons using electricity.

=== Web ===
- A 2014 web series Frankenstein, MD, created by PBS Digital Studios and Pemberley Digital, focuses on Victoria Frankenstein, a medical student determined to prove herself in her field. This series gender-swaps several characters – Elizabeth becomes Eli Lavenza and Henry becomes Rory Clerval.

=== Ballet ===
- In 2016, The Royal Ballet and The San Francisco Ballet co-produced an adaptation of Mary Shelley's novel. The evening-length ballet was choreographed and led by the former Royal Ballet principal dancer and Artist in Residence of The Royal Ballet, Liam Scarlett. The ballet features music by Lowell Liebermann, set design by John Macfarlane, lighting by David Finn, and production design by Finn Ross. It held its world premiere at The Royal Ballet's Covent Garden on 4 May 2016 and the SF Ballet premiere on 17 February 2017.

=== Theme park ===
The Universal Epic Universe area Dark Universe (which is based on the Universal Monsters franchise) reveals that Henry Frankenstein has a great-great-great-granddaughter named Victoria Frankenstein who is following in Henry's footsteps where she created her version of Frankenstein's monster (who she doesn't call a monster). The attraction "Monsters Unchained: The Frankenstein Experiment" has Victoria working to find a way to get control of the monsters that attack Darkmoor Village which doesn't go the way she hoped.

== See also ==
- Frankenstein Castle – Castle in Hesse, Germany
- Frankenstein in popular culture
- Gothic aspects in Frankenstein
- Literature of England
- Plainpalais

== Sources ==
- Duperray, Max (1994). Mary Shelley, Frankenstein (in French and English). Vanves: CNED.
- Lecercle, Jean-Jacques (1988). Frankenstein: mythe et philosophie. Paris: PUF. ISBN 978-2-13-041872-6.
- Burke, Edmund (1757). A Philosophical Enquiry into the Origin of Our Ideas of the Sublime and Beautiful. London: Printed for R. and J. Dodsley.
  "Edmund Burke's work online". gutenberg.org.
- Shelley, Mary; Wolfson, Susan J. (2007). Frankenstein. New York: Pearson Longman. ISBN 978-0-321-39953-3.
- Shelley, Mary; Paley, Morton D. (1998). The Last Man. Oxford: Oxford Paperbacks. ISBN 0-19-283865-2.
- Ferrieux, Robert (1994). Mary Shelley, Frankenstein (in French and English). Perpignan: Université de Perpignan Via Domitia.
- Hume, R. D. (1969). Gothic vs Romantic; A Revaluation of the Gothic Novel. Los Angeles: PMLA 84. pp. 282-290.
- Scholes, R.; Rabkin, Eric S. (1972). SF, History, Science, Vision. London: Weidenfeld & Nicolson. pp. 182-183.
- Abensour, Liliane; Charras, Françoise (1978). "Gothique au féminin". Romantisme noir. Paris: L'Herne. pp. 244-252.
- Punter, David (1980). "Gothic and Romanticism". The Literature of Terror : A History of Gothic Fictions from 1765 to the present day. London: Longman.
- Lacassin, Francis (1991). "Frankenstein ou l'hygiène du macabre". Mythologie et fantastique: les rivages de la nuit. Paris: Les Rivages de la nuit, jean-Pierre Bertrand ed.1991. pp. 29-51.
- Smith, Johanna (1992). Frankenstein, A Case Study in Contemporary Criticism. Boston: Bedford Books of st Martin's Press.
- Moeckli, Gustave (1962). Une Genevois méconnu: Frankenstein (in French). Genève: Musée de Genève, 111. pp. 10–13.
- Cude, Wilfred (1972). "M. Shelley's Modern Prometheus: A Study in the ethics of scientific creativity" (PDF). The Dalhousie Review. Vol. 52, no. 2. Dalhousie: Dalhousie University. pp. 212–225..
- Pollin, B. R. (1965). "Philosophical and Literary Sources of Frankenstein". Comparative Literature, 17.2. pp. 97-108.
- Ketterer, David (1979). Frankenstein's Creation, The Book, The Monster and the Human Reality. Victoria: Victoria University Press.
- Ponneau, G. (1976). Le mythe de Frankenstein et le retour aux images (in French). Paris: Trames. pp. 3-16.
- Levine, G. (1973). "Frankenstein and the tradition of Realism". Novel, 7. pp. 14-30.
