= Frankenstein's Aunt =

Character in novels by Allan Rune Pettersson

Frankenstein's Aunt is the protagonist of three novels: two by Allan Rune Pettersson and the third a novelization of a seven-episode TV miniseries of the same name based on the first Pettersson novel. The story is a humorous homage to the Universal Horror Frankenstein films, and aimed at 9-12 year olds.

== Novels ==
=== Frankenstein's Aunt (1978) ===
The novel is about Hannah Frankenstein, the Baron's aunt, who comes to Frankenstein's Castle to put it back in order, following the chaos caused by her nephew's experiments.

=== Frankenstein's Aunt Returns (1989) ===
The novel is about Franklin, a child created by Doctor Frankenstein with the help of Doctor Pretorius for the monster and his bride.

=== Frankensteins Tante (1987) ===
A novel by Werner Meier was published in German in Austria in 1987 which retells the story of the TV series with almost no differences. The book has the title Frankensteins Tante which means Frankenstein's Aunt.

== Television series ==
A TV series was produced in 1986 based on Frankenstein's Aunt.

== Literature ==
- Allan Rune Pettersson: Frankenstein's Aunt, ISBN 0-435-12260-6
