= Allan Rune Pettersson =

Swedish author (1936–2018)

Allan Rune Pettersson (9 March 1936 – 15 August 2018) was a Swedish author.

After a varied career as a producer of children's programmes on Swedish radio and later as an innkeeper in Portugal, he became a freelance writer on his return to Sweden in 1965.

He has written several children's books, plays for children and adults for stage, radio and TV. Notable books include Frankenstein's Aunt and Frankenstein's Aunt Returns.

== Works ==
=== Children's books ===
- Morbror Adolf Series:
  1. Leta rätt på morbror Adolf (1963)
  2. Morbror Adolf försvinner igen (1964)
  3. Morbror Adolf går till botten (1966)
  4. Morbror Adolf rider västerut (1967)
  5. Morbror Adolf på månen (1970)
- Ett hus i Portugal (1965)
- Snagg, en sjöman med krut i (1968)
- Jätten Sju Trappor (1969)
- En skorsten på huvet (1972)
- Frankenstein's Aunt Series:
  1. Frankenstein's Aunt (Frankensteins faster) (1978) ISBN 0-435-12260-6
  2. Frankenstein's Aunt Returns (Frankensteins faster - igen!) (1989) ISBN 0-340-53244-0
- Fyra lejon äter middag (1982)
- Kalle o Kamillo (1983)

=== Plays ===
- Dr Jekyll & Mr Hyde (1961)
- Barnförbjudet (1969)
- Blåmärken (1969)
- Örat (1970)
