= New Trier, Minnesota =

City in Minnesota, United States

New Trier
- City
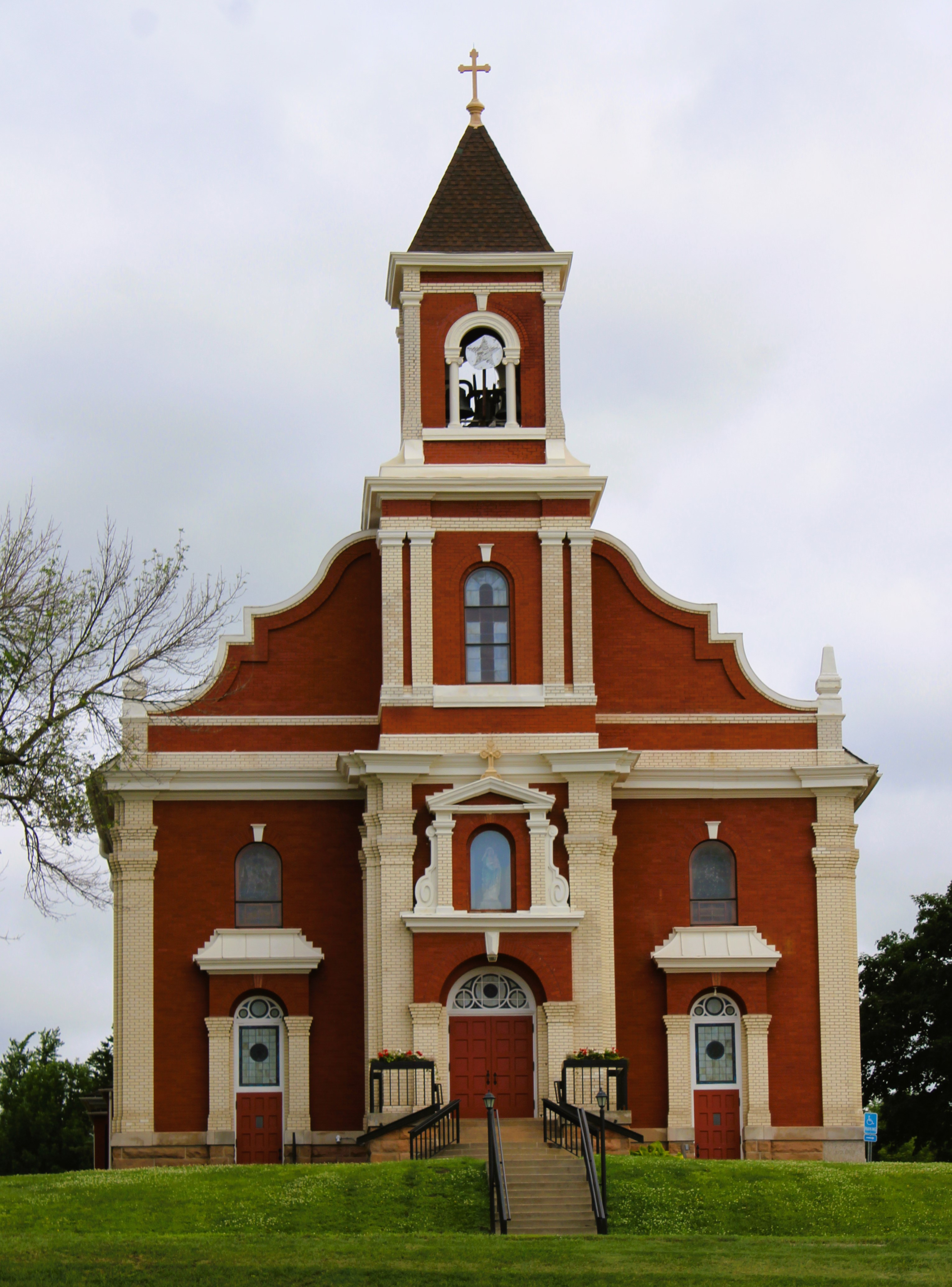
- St. Mary's Catholic Church

- Location of the city of New Trier within Dakota County, Minnesota
- Coordinates: 44°36′10″N 92°56′0″W
- Country: United States
- State: Minnesota
- County: Dakota

Area
  - Total: 0.19 sq mi (0.49 km^{2})
  - Land: 0.19 sq mi (0.49 km^{2})
  - Water: 0 sq mi (0.00 km^{2})
- Elevation: 981 ft (299 m)

Population (2020)
  - Total: 86
  - Density: 457.8/sq mi (176.76/km^{2})
- Time zone: UTC-6 (Central (CST))
  - Summer (DST): UTC-5 (CDT)
- Area code: 651
- FIPS code: 27-46024
- GNIS feature ID: 0648522
- Website: https://www.cityofnewtriermn.com/

New Trier (/njuː ˈtrɪər/ new TREER) is a city in Dakota County, Minnesota, United States. As of the 2020 census, New Trier had a population of 86. Minnesota Highway 50 serves as a main route in the community.

== History ==
A post office called New Trier was established in 1867, and remained in operation until it was discontinued in 1933. A share of the early settlers being natives of Trier, Germany caused the name to be selected.

== Geography ==
According to the United States Census Bureau, the city has a total area of 0.21 square miles (0.54 km^{2}), all of it land.

New Trier is located entirely within Hampton Township geographically but is a separate entity. New Trier is in the southeastern part of Dakota County.

== Demographics ==
Historical population
Census	Pop.	Note	%±
1880	104		—
1890	129		24.0%
1900	126		−2.3%
1910	144		14.3%
1920	122		−15.3%
1930	80		−34.4%
1940	79		−1.2%
1950	73		−7.6%
1960	106		45.2%
1970	153		44.3%
1980	115		−24.8%
1990	96		−16.5%
2000	116		20.8%
2010	112		−3.4%
2020	86		−23.2%
U.S. Decennial Census

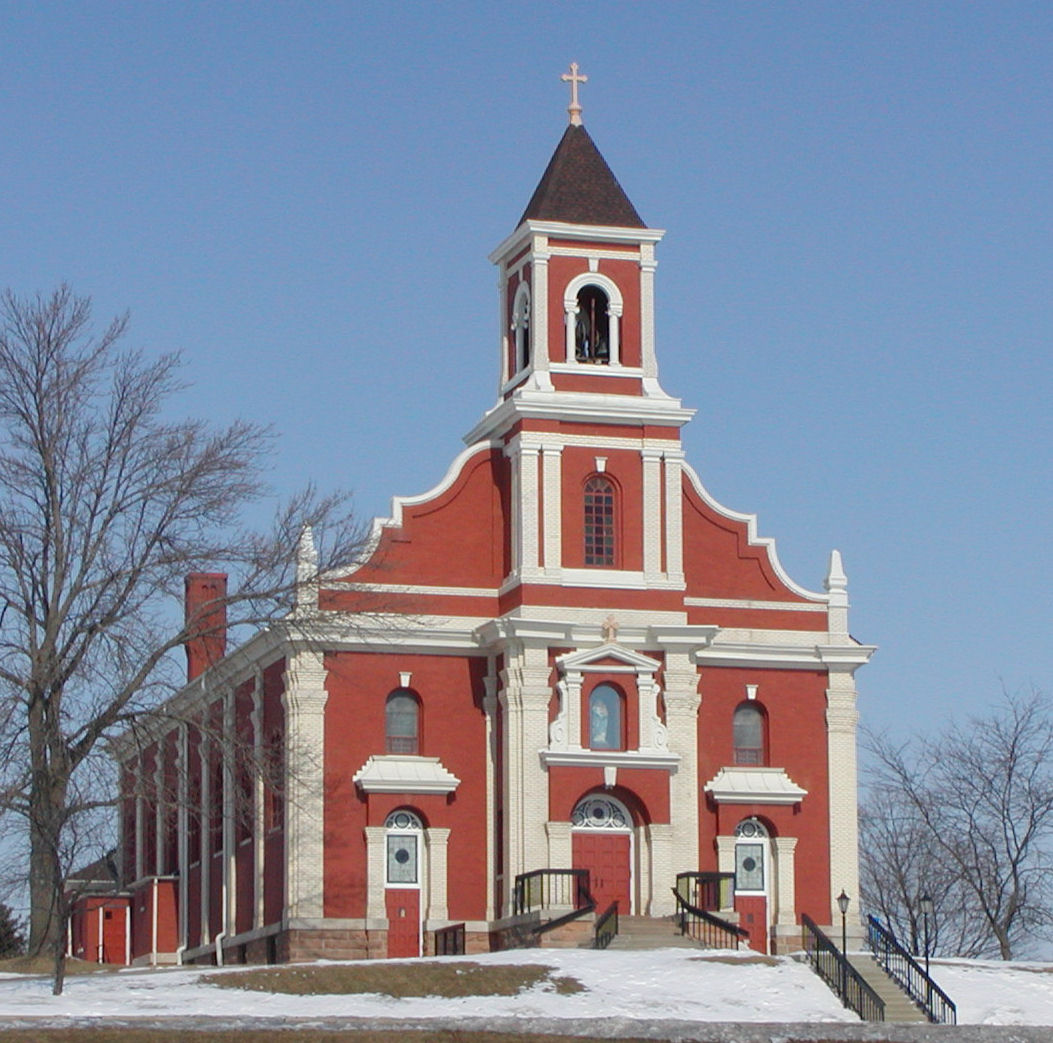
St. Mary's Catholic Church in New Trier

=== 2010 census ===
As of the census of 2010, there were 112 people, 41 households, and 34 families living in the city. The population density was 533.3 inhabitants per square mile (205.9/km^{2}). There were 42 housing units at an average density of 200.0 per square mile (77.2/km^{2}). The racial makeup of the city was 97.3% White, 0.9% African American, 0.9% Native American, and 0.9% from two or more races.

There were 41 households, of which 36.6% had children under the age of 18 living with them, 68.3% were married couples living together, 12.2% had a female householder with no husband present, 2.4% had a male householder with no wife present, and 17.1% were non-families. 14.6% of all households were made up of individuals. The average household size was 2.73 and the average family size was 3.00.

The median age in the city was 35.4 years. 25.9% of residents were under the age of 18; 6.3% were between the ages of 18 and 24; 33.1% were from 25 to 44; 25.9% were from 45 to 64; and 8.9% were 65 years of age or older. The gender makeup of the city was 50.0% male and 50.0% female.

New Trier is the smallest incorporated city (by population) within the seven-county metro area of the Twin Cities.

=== 2000 census ===
As of the census of 2000, there were 116 people, 31 households, and 27 families living in the city. The population density was 592.0 inhabitants per square mile (228.6/km^{2}). There were 31 housing units at an average density of 158.2 per square mile (61.1/km^{2}). The racial makeup of the city was 94.83% White, 1.72% Native American, and 3.45% from two or more races. Hispanic or Latino of any race were 3.45% of the population.

There were 31 households, out of which 54.8% had children under the age of 18 living with them, 77.4% were married couples living together, 6.5% had a female householder with no husband present, and 12.9% were non-families. 3.2% of all households were made up of individuals, and none had someone living alone who was 65 years of age or older. The average household size was 3.68 and the average family size was 3.89.

In the city, the population was spread out, with 38.8% under the age of 18, 6.9% from 18 to 24, 33.6% from 25 to 44, 15.5% from 45 to 64, and 5.2% who were 65 years of age or older. The median age was 31 years. For every 100 females, there were 127.5 males. For every 100 females age 18 and over, there were 97.2 males.

The median income for a household in the city was $59,583, and the median income for a family was $71,875. Males had a median income of $31,875 versus $30,179 for females. The per capita income for the city was $18,427. There were no families and 2.5% of the population living below the poverty line, including no under eighteens and none of those over 64.

== Notable people ==
Edward Van Sloan - American character actor best remembered for his roles in the Universal Studios horror films such as Dracula (1931), Frankenstein (1931), and The Mummy (1932).
