= Peggy Webling =

British playwright, novelist and poet

Margaret Webling (1 January 1871 – 27 June 1949) was a British playwright, novelist and poet. Her 1927 play version of Mary Shelley's 1818 novel Frankenstein; or, The Modern Prometheus is notable for naming the creature "Frankenstein" after its creator, and for being the inspiration of the classic 1931 film directed by James Whale.

== Personal life ==
She was born Margaret Webling in Westminster, England; her father was a silversmith and jeweler. Peggy and her sisters Josephine, Rosalind and Lucy were precocious at performing amateur theatricals in London, and gained the acquaintance of actress Ellen Terry, and authors Lewis Carroll and John Ruskin. She spent time in Canada and the United States during the periods 1890–1892 and 1895–1897.

== Frankenstein ==
Webling sent her adaptation of Frankenstein to actor-producer Hamilton Deane, who had a recent success in his stage adaptation of Bram Stoker's 1897 novel Dracula. Webling's Frankenstein was first produced by Deane in Preston, Lancashire in December 1927. After touring in repertory with Dracula for two years, and some revisions by Webling, it opened in London in February 1930, where it played 72 performances. The Times of London wrote, "Miss Webling, translating into terms of the theatre Mary Shelley's one lasting and original composition, has unquestionably succeeded in bringing the monster to life; but the play in which she exhibits this wild beast is as flimsy as a bird cage."

In the play, the name "Frankenstein" refers to both the scientist and the monster. This was the first time the creature was named after its creator.

In April 1931, Universal Pictures bought the film rights to an unproduced American adaptation of Webling's play by John L. Balderston (who had similarly adapted Deane's Dracula for the New York stage), and gave Webling and Balderston $20,000 plus one per cent of the gross earnings on all showings of any films based on their dramatic work. Balderston had a low regard for Webling's play, calling it "illiterate" and "inconceivably crude".

== Bibliography ==
- Poems and Stories (1896), with Lucy Webling
- Blue Jay (1905), a novel.
- The Story of Virginia Perfect (1909)
- The Spirit of Mirth (1910), a novel.
- Felix Christie (1912)
- The Pearl Stringer (1913)
- Edgar Chirrup (1915), a novel.
- Boundary House (1916), a novel.
- In Our Street (1918), a novel.
- Guests of the Heart (1918)
- The Scent Shop (1919)
- Saints and Their Stories (1919), an illustrated children's book.
- Comedy Corner (1920)
- A Sketch of John Ruskin (1920)
- Verses to Men (1920)
- The Life of Isobel Erne (1922), a novel.
- The Fruitless Orchard (1922)
- Peggy: The Story of One Score Years and Ten (1924), a memoir.
- The Amber Merchant (1925)
- Anna Maria (1927)
- Strange Entertainment (1929)
- Aspidistra’s Career (1936)
- Opal Screens (1937)
- Young Lætitia (1939)

Both the 1927 and the 1930 version of Webling's Frankenstein have since been published in the book Peggy Webling and the Story behind Frankenstein, by Bruce Graver and Dorian Gieseler Greenbaum. In addition, the book also features a 1928 version of the play.
