= Church of Saint Mary's (New Trier, Minnesota) =

Historic church in Minnesota, United States

- Church of St Mary's--Catholic
- U.S. National Register of Historic Places
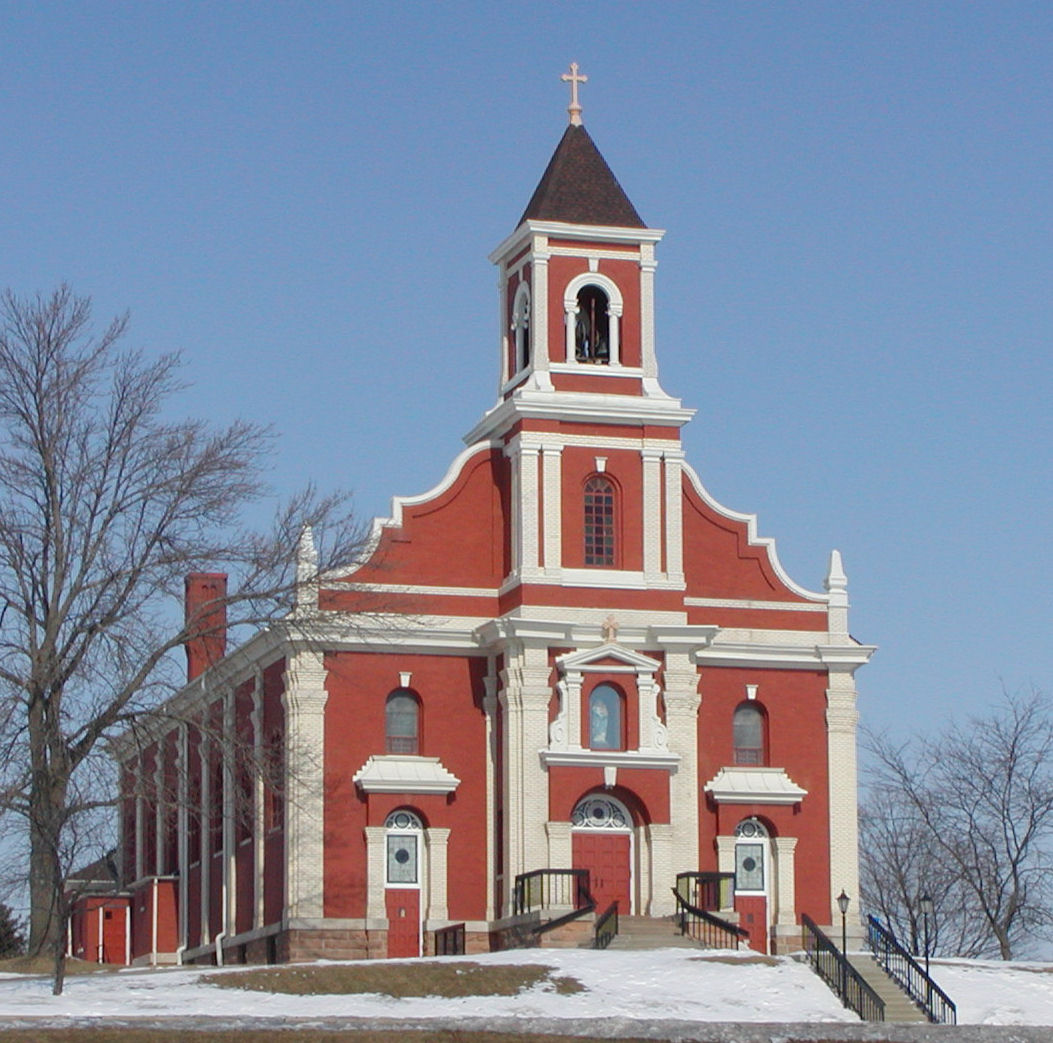
- The Church of Saint Mary's from the south-southwest

- Location within Minnesota Location within the United States
- Location: New Trier, Minnesota
- Coordinates: 44°36′11.4″N 92°56′7.6″W
- Area: 3.7 acres (1.5 ha)
- Architect: Ries, George J.
- Architectural style: Beaux-Arts
- NRHP reference No.: 79001233
- Added to NRHP: December 31, 1979

The Church of Saint Mary's is a 1909 Beaux-Arts Catholic church, located at 8433 239th Street East, New Trier in the U.S. state of Minnesota. The bright red building sits high on a hill overlooking the town, which was settled by German immigrants from Trier. The immigrants began arriving in 1854, and in 1857, they built a log church. In 1864, they built a larger stone church on a hill above the town.

In 1909 the congregation decided to build a new, larger church. George J. Ries of St. Paul, who also designed the Church of St. Agnes, used a Beaux-Arts style for the new church. It is built of red brick and can be seen for miles, being perched on a hilltop. The cornerstone from the old church is installed in the vestibule, and a five-foot tall statue of the Blessed Virgin Mary from 1862 is located in a shrine above the main entrance.

The church was listed on the National Register of Historic Places for its association with the German immigrants who almost exclusively populated southeastern Dakota County in the second half of the 20th century.

== See also ==
- National Register of Historic Places listings in Dakota County, Minnesota
