= Edward Van Sloan =

American actor

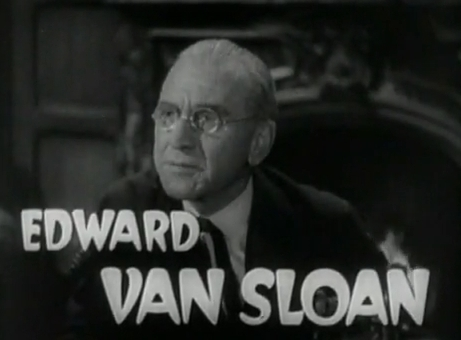
- Van Sloan as Van Helsing in Dracula's Daughter (1936).
- Born: Edward Paul Van Sloun; November 1, 1882; New Trier, Minnesota, U.S.
- Died: March 6, 1964 (aged 81); San Francisco, California, U.S.
- Occupation: Actor
- Years active: 1916–1950
- Spouse: Myra Jackson (1911–1960; her death)
- Children: 1

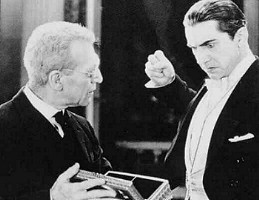
Edward Van Sloan and Bela Lugosi in Dracula (1931)

Edward Van Sloan (born Edward Paul Van Sloun; November 1, 1882 – March 6, 1964) was an American character actor best remembered for his roles in the Universal Studios horror films such as Dracula (1931), Frankenstein (1931), The Mummy (1932), and Dracula's Daughter (1936).

== Early years ==
Edward Paul Van Sloun was of Dutch and German descent and was born in New Trier, Minnesota, on November 1, 1882, the son of Martinus Van Sloun and Theresa (née Breher) Van Sloun. He was living in San Francisco by 1900 with his aunt Mary (née Breher) Baumann and her daughter Alma. His mother settled in San Francisco, where young Edward resided with his siblings (the artist Frank J., Mary D., Leonora M., Alma K., Josephine) and mother as he launched his acting career in theaters.

== Career ==
In 1915, Van Sloan was the leading man with the Forsberg Players, based at the Fulton Opera House in Lancaster, Pennsylvania.

Van Sloan's roles in Universal's films date from the 1930s, including Dracula (1931), Frankenstein (1931), and The Mummy (1932). In the first of these, he played Professor Van Helsing, the famous vampire-hunter, a role he had first taken in the successful touring production of Dracula by Hamilton Deane and John L. Balderston. He played essentially the same role, this time as Dr. Muller, an occultist, in The Mummy. He again played Van Helsing in the 1936 film Dracula's Daughter. In Frankenstein, he played the character of Dr. Waldman, and he also stepped in front of a curtain before the film's opening credits to warn audience members that they now had a chance to escape the theatre if they were too squeamish to endure the film.

On Broadway, Van Sloan's credits included The Vigil (1948), Remote Control (1929), Dracula (1927), Lost (1927), Juarez and Maximilian (1926), Schweiger (1926), Morals (1925), Polly Preferred (1923), and The Unknown Purple (1919).

== Personal life ==
In 1910, Van Sloan acted in Pinero, in Montreal, Quebec, Canada, where he married the leading lady Myra Jackson, with whom he had one child, Paul (born February 21, 1911, in Pennsylvania). During the 1920s, Van Sloan appeared in several plays at the 48th Street Theater on Broadway, including the 1924 stage adaptation of Dracula before accepting an offer in late 1930 (at age 48) for a part in the acclaimed Tod Browning-directed screen production of Dracula. He died in 1964 at age 81. He was cremated at Olivet Gardens of Cypress Lawn Memorial Park in Colma, California. However, his family buried his urn at Boehm Cemetery in Blue Bell, Pennsylvania.

== Filmography ==
- Slander (1916) – Joseph Tremaine (film debut)
- Dracula (1931) – Professor Van Helsing
- Frankenstein (1931) – Dr. Waldman
- Under Eighteen (1931) – Assistant to François (uncredited)
- Manhattan Parade (1931) – The Lawyer (uncredited)
- Behind the Mask (1932) – Dr. August Steiner
- Play Girl (1932) – Moffatt, the Boss
- Man Wanted (1932) – Mr. Walters
- Forgotten Commandments (1932) – Doctor (uncredited)
- Thunder Below (1932) – Doctor (uncredited)
- The Last Mile (1932) – Rabbi
- The Death Kiss (1932) – Tom Avery
- The Mummy (1932) – Dr. Muller
- The Billion Dollar Scandal (1933) – Attorney Carp
- Infernal Machine (1933) – Professor Gustabve Hoffman
- The World Gone Mad (1933) – (uncredited)
- The Working Man (1933) – Mr. Briggs
- Trick for Trick (1933) – John Russell
- The Silk Express (1933) – Mill Owner in Association (uncredited)
- It's Great to Be Alive (1933) – Dr. Wilton
- Baby Face (1933) – Jameson – Bank Director (uncredited)
- Deluge (1933) – Professor Carlysle
- Murder on the Campus (1933) – Prof. C. Edson Hawley
- Goodbye Love (1933) – Judge
- Blood Money (1933) – Jordan - Department Store Manager (uncredited)
- The Crosby Case (1934) – Professor Franz Lubeck
- Manhattan Melodrama (1934) – Yacht Capt. Swenson (uncredited)
- The Scarlet Empress (1934) – Herr Wagner (uncredited)
- The Life of Vergie Winters (1934) – Jim Winters
- I'll Fix It (1934) – Parkes
- Mills of the Gods (1934) – Komeoski
- The Man Who Reclaimed His Head (1934) – Board Director (uncredited)
- Grand Old Girl (1935) – Holland
- A Shot in the Dark (1935) – Prof. Bostwick
- The Woman in Red (1935) – Foxall - Prosecuting Attorney
- Death Flies East (1935) – Dr. O'Neill (uncredited)
- Captain Hurricane (1935) – Man at Susan Ann's Bedside (uncredited)
- Air Hawks (1935) – Prof. Schulter
- The Arizonian (1935) – Judge Cody (uncredited)
- The Black Room (1935) – Doctor (uncredited)
- The Last Days of Pompeii (1935) – Calvus
- Three Kids and a Queen (1935) – Dr. Gordon
- Grand Exit (1935) – Klorer (uncredited)
- The Story of Louis Pasteur (1936) – Chairman at Medical Society (uncredited)
- Road Gang (1936) – Mr. Dudley
- Dracula's Daughter (1936) – Professor Von Helsing [sic]
- Fatal Lady (1936) – French Surete (uncredited)
- Sins of Man (1936) – Austrian Army Doctor
- The Man Who Found Himself (1937) – Medical Board Doctor (uncredited)
- The Road Back (1937) – President (uncredited)
- Souls at Sea (1937) – Ship's Officer (uncredited)
- Penitentiary (1938) – Dr. Rinewulf (uncredited)
- The Toy Wife (1938) – Older Man (uncredited)
- Danger on the Air (1938) – Dr. Leonard Sylvester
- Campus Confessions (1938) – Professor (uncredited)
- Storm Over Bengal (1938) – Maharajah of Lhanapur
- The Phantom Creeps (1939, Serial) – Jarvis [Chs. 2-12]
- Honeymoon in Bali (1939) – Priest on Bali (uncredited)
- Abe Lincoln in Illinois (1940) – Dr. Barrett (uncredited)
- Teddy, the Rough Rider (1940, Short) – Elihu Root (uncredited)
- The Doctor Takes a Wife (1940) – Burkhardt
- The Secret Seven (1940) – Prof. Holtz
- Before I Hang (1940) – Dr. Ralph Howard
- Virginia (1941) – Minister (uncredited)
- The Monster and the Girl (1941) – Dave – the Warden (uncredited)
- Love Crazy (1941) – Sanity Hearing Doctor (uncredited)
- The Men in Her Life (1941) – First Doctor (uncredited)
- A Man's World (1942) – Doc Stone
- Destination Unknown (1942) – Holland Legation (uncredited)
- Valley of Hunted Men (1942) – Dr. Heinrich Steiner
- Hitler's Children (1943) – Chief Tribunal Judge (uncredited)
- Submarine Alert (1943) – Dr. Johann Bergstrom (uncredited)
- Mission to Moscow (1943) – German Diplomat in Berlin (uncredited)
- Riders of the Rio Grande (1943, Serial) – Pop Owens
- The Masked Marvel (1943, Serial) – Prof. A.M. MacRae (uncredited)
- The Song of Bernadette (1943) – Doctor (uncredited)
- Captain America (1944) – Gregory-Lyman's Aide [Chs. 1-2] (uncredited)
- Wing and a Prayer (1944) – Admiral (uncredited)
- The Conspirators (1944) – Dutch Underground Leader (uncredited)
- End of the Road (1944) – Judge
- I'll Remember April (1945) – Board Member (uncredited)
- The Mask of Diijon (1946) – Sheffield
- Betty Co-Ed (1946) – A.J.A. Woodruff
- A Foreign Affair (1948) – German (uncredited)
- Sealed Verdict (1948) – Priest
- This Side of the Law (1950) – Judge (uncredited)
- The Underworld Story (1950) – Minister at Funeral (uncredited; final film role)
- Renfield (2023) – Professor Van Helsing (posthumous; archive footage)
