= Doctor Waldman =

Fictional character in Mary Shelley's 1818 novel, Frankenstein

- Frankenstein; or, The Modern Prometheus character
- Created by: Mary Shelley
- Portrayed by: Edward Van Sloan (1931 film); William Hansen (1973 film); John Cleese (1994 film); William Hurt (2004 miniseries); Neil Pearson (2007 film)

In-universe information
- Species: Human
- Gender: Male
- Occupation: Professor
- Status: Deceased (original film and 1994 remake); Alive (original novel)

Dr. Waldman is a fictional character who appears in Mary Shelley's 1818 novel, Frankenstein; or, The Modern Prometheus and in its subsequent film versions. He is a professor at Ingolstadt University who specializes in chemistry and is a mentor of Victor Frankenstein.

== History ==
In the novel, Waldman is introduced when Frankenstein attends his lecture on chemistry. He is described as about fifty years old and both his kindness and his perspective on science make an impression on Frankenstein. He is presented in contrast with M. Krempe, another professor at the university, in that he did not scorn the study of alchemists. Before Frankenstein came to the university, he had lost his interest in science, believing that nothing could be known about the world and disappointed by the inability of science to match the goals of the alchemists he once studied. At the conclusion of the lecture, Waldman makes a statement that has a great impact on Frankenstein.

"The ancient teachers of this science promised impossibilities, and performed nothing. The modern masters promise very little; they know that metals cannot be transmuted, and that the elixir of life is a chimera. But these philosophers, whose hands seem only made to dabble in dirt, and their eyes to pore over the microscope or crucible, have indeed performed miracles. They penetrate into the recesses of nature, and show how she works in her hiding-places. They ascend into the heavens; they have discovered how the blood circulates, and the nature of the air we breathe. They have acquired new and almost unlimited powers; they can command the thunders of heaven, mimic the earthquake, and even mock the invisible world with its own shadows"

— M. Waldman,

Waldman restores Frankenstein's interest in science and inspires him to pursue his own research.

== Adaptations ==
=== 1931 version ===
In the 1931 film version of Frankenstein, Dr. Waldman (portrayed by Edward Van Sloan) was a professor of anatomical studies at Goldstadt Medical College. Waldman had been Henry Frankenstein's favourite teacher during the aspiring young scientist's time as a student there. Although Waldman had much respect for Henry's brilliance, he became increasingly disturbed when Henry began demanding fresh bodies for his experiments in chemical galvanism and electro-biology: bodies that were not those of cats and dogs, but human beings. Eventually, the increasingly ambitious Henry left the college to pursue his researches in private. Some time later, Henry's fiancée, Elizabeth, and best friend, Victor Moritz, came to the college to confide in Waldman their fears for Henry's health. After telling them of Henry's decision to leave the school, Waldman agreed to accompany them to Henry's lab to talk some sense into him. Instead, the three bore witness to Henry Frankenstein's crowning achievement: the creation of a creature he had built from parts of dead bodies sewn together, plus a brain that Henry's assistant Fritz had stolen from Waldman's classroom. Waldman tried to tell Henry that the Monster had a defective brain and was dangerous, as Fritz had dropped the chosen brain and brought a criminal one, but this fact only sank in when the monster killed Fritz. They locked up the Monster, and then unlocked the door, injecting him with a sedative in the back which knocked him out after he had nearly killed Frankenstein.

Suffering a nervous breakdown, Henry was taken home by Elizabeth, Victor, and his father, Baron Frankenstein. Waldman remained at the laboratory for the purposes of destroying the Monster by dissection. The Monster awoke before Waldman could begin, however, and, seizing Waldman by the throat, he proceeded to strangle the old man to death.

The character of Dr. Waldman would later appear in 1932's Boo!, a comedy short made by Universal, in which he is once again strangled to death by the Monster despite the narrator's attempts to warn him.

=== 1994 version ===
In Branagh's film, it is Professor Shmael Augustus Waldman (portrayed by John Cleese) —first and middle name revealed in the comic adaptation of the film—who teaches Victor how to re-animate dead tissue. He previously followed the same path Victor will eventually take, conducting illegal experiments on the human body, only to stop after they brought about "abomination." Waldman and Victor are administering vaccines to the local townspeople. One townsperson (portrayed by Robert De Niro) resists and stabs Waldman, resulting in his hanging. Victor uses the killer's body, Waldman's brain, and the leg of a late fellow student named Schiller (portrayed by Hugh Bonneville) who died from Cholera to form the Monster (also portrayed by Robert De Niro).

=== Other versions ===
- The character of Professor Bernstein in the 1957 Hammer film The Curse of Frankenstein is meant to be a replacement for Doctor Waldman.
- Professor Waldman appears in the 1973 Frankenstein film portrayed by William Hansen.
- Professor Waldman appears in the 2004 miniseries Frankenstein portrayed by William Hurt. Similar to the 1931 Universal adaptation of the character, Professor Waldman is aware of Frankenstein's reanimation experiments and firmly objects to them.
- In the 2007 film Frankenstein, Andrew Waldman (portrayed by Neil Pearson) is the friend and colleague of Victoria Frankenstein who helps to oversee the Universal Xenograft Project that involves stem cells and biotechnology. When the UX is created from the blood of Victoria's son William, Waldman is informed of its creation and its escape. When the UX returns to the laboratory, it kills Waldman, Victoria's assistant Ed Gore, and a security guard.

== Character origin ==
M. Waldman may have been inspired by James Lind.
