= Frankenstein (1931 film) =

1931 film by James Whale

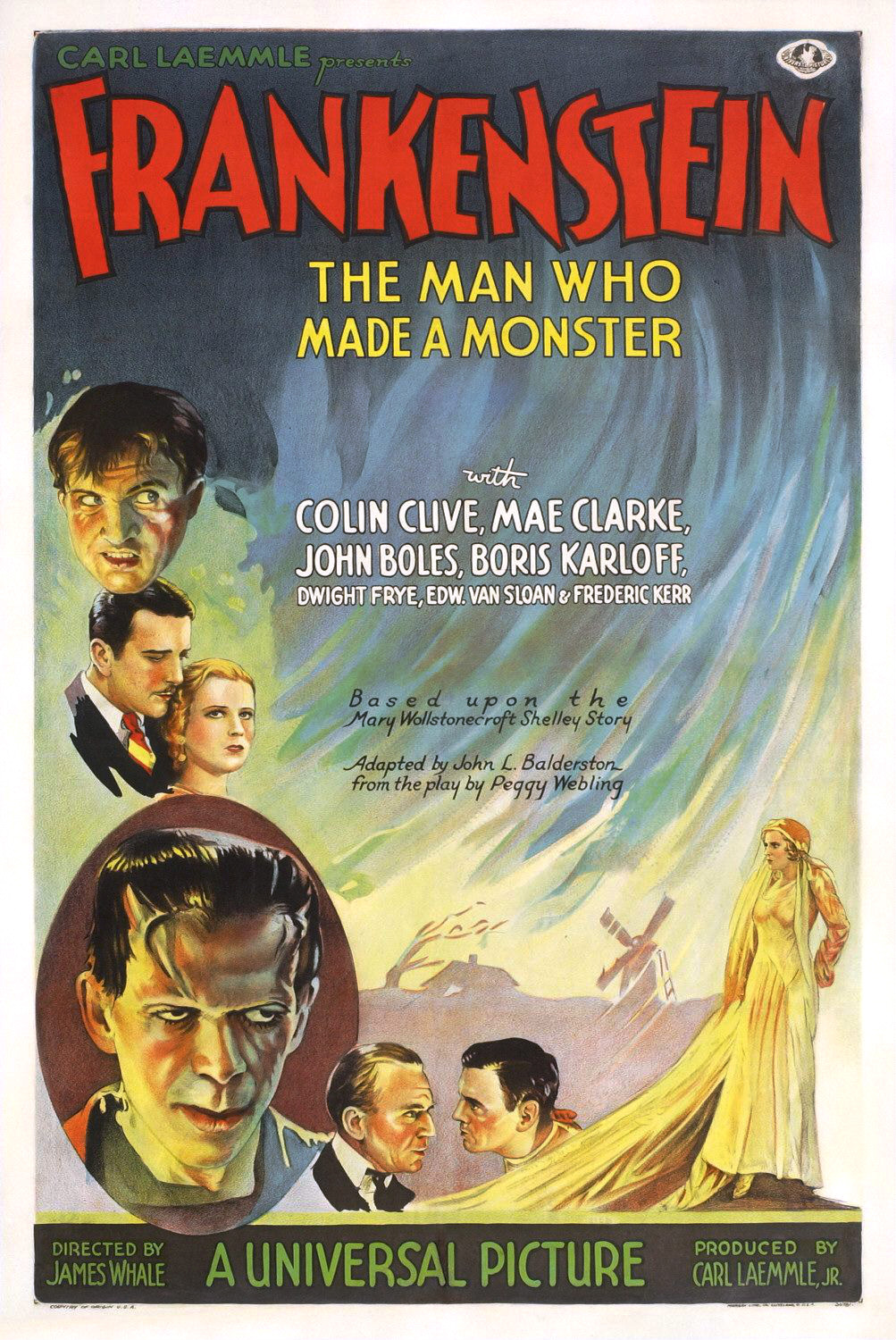
- Theatrical release poster by Karoly Grosz
- Directed by: James Whale
- Screenplay by: Garrett Fort; Francis Edward Faragoh
- Adaptation by: John L. Balderston (Note: Credited onscreen with "Based upon the composition by".)
- Based on: Frankenstein; or, The Modern Prometheus 1818 novel by Mary Shelley (Note: Named in promotional material as "Mary Wollstonecraft Shelley", and onscreen as "Mrs. Percy B. Shelley".); Frankenstein: An Adventure in the Macabre 1927 play by Peggy Webling
- Produced by: Carl Laemmle Jr.
- Starring: Colin Clive; Mae Clarke; John Boles; Boris Karloff; Dwight Frye; Edward Van Sloan; Frederick Kerr
- Cinematography: Arthur Edeson
- Edited by: Maurice Pivar
- Music by: Bernhard Kaun
- Production company: Universal Pictures
- Distributed by: Universal Pictures
- Release date: November 21, 1931
- Running time: 70 minutes
- Country: United States
- Language: English
- Budget: $262,007
- Box office: $12 million

Frankenstein is a 1931 American pre-Code horror film directed by James Whale and produced by Carl Laemmle Jr.. It is adapted from the 1927 play Frankenstein: An Adventure in the Macabre by Peggy Webling, which in turn was based on Mary Shelley's 1818 novel Frankenstein; or, The Modern Prometheus. The Webling play was adapted by John L. Balderston, while the screenplay was written by Garrett Fort and Francis Edward Faragoh, with uncredited contributions from Robert Florey and John Russell.

Frankenstein stars Colin Clive as Henry Frankenstein, an obsessed scientist who digs up corpses with his assistant to assemble a living being from body parts. The resulting creature, often known as Frankenstein's monster, is portrayed by Boris Karloff. The makeup for the monster was provided by Jack Pierce. Alongside Clive and Karloff, the film's cast also includes Mae Clarke, John Boles, Dwight Frye, and Edward Van Sloan.

Produced and distributed by Universal Pictures, the film was a commercial success upon release, and was generally well received by both critics and audiences. It spawned a number of sequels and spin-offs, and has had a significant impact on popular culture: the imagery of a maniacal "mad" scientist with a hunchbacked assistant and the film's depiction of Frankenstein's monster have since become iconic. In 1991, the United States Library of Congress selected Frankenstein for preservation in the National Film Registry as being "culturally, historically, or aesthetically significant".

As a published work from 1931, the film will enter the American public domain on January 1, 2027.

== Plot ==
The film's trailer

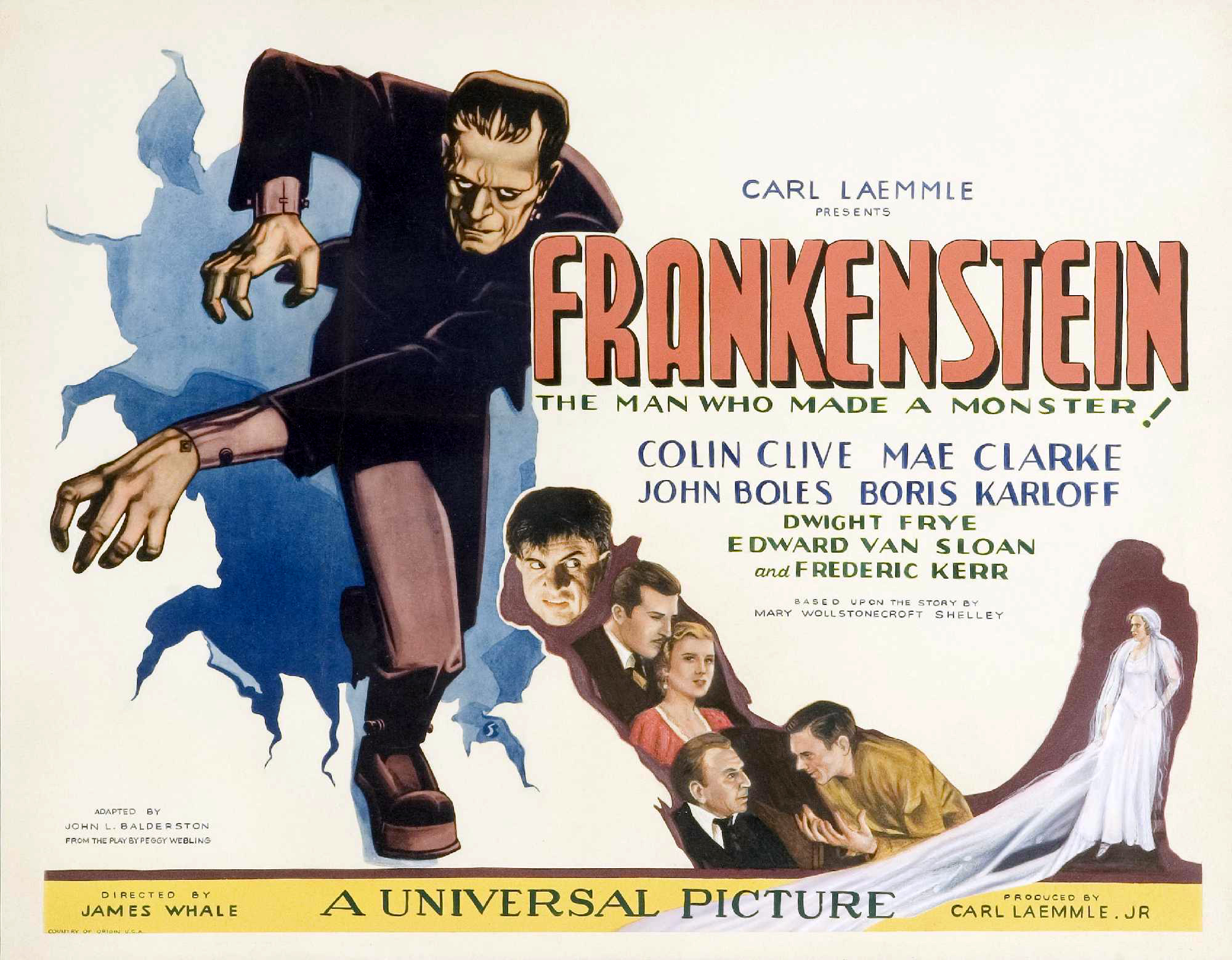
Frankenstein lobby card

In a village in the Bavarian Alps, scientist Henry Frankenstein and his hunchbacked assistant Fritz piece together a human body. Some of the parts are from freshly buried bodies, others from recently hanged criminals. Henry desires to create a human, giving this body life through electrical devices. He still needs a brain for his creation. Henry's former teacher Dr. Waldman shows his class the brain of an average human being and the corrupted brain of a criminal for comparison. Henry sends Fritz to steal the healthy brain from Waldman's class. Fritz accidentally damages it, and so brings Henry the criminal brain.

Henry's fiancée Elizabeth Lavenza speaks with their friend Victor about the scientist's peculiar actions and his seclusion. Elizabeth and Victor ask Waldman for help understanding Henry's behavior, and Waldman reveals he is aware Henry wishes to create life. Concerned for Henry, they arrive at his lab just as he makes his final preparations, the lifeless body on an operating table. As a storm rages, Henry invites Elizabeth and the others to watch. Henry and Fritz raise the operating table toward an opening at the top of the tower. The creature and Henry's equipment are exposed to the lightning storm and empowered, bringing the creature to life. Henry is ecstatic at the sight of the creature moving and has to be restrained by Victor and Waldman. Henry proclaims he now knows what it feels like to be God.

Frankenstein's Monster, despite its grotesque form, seems to be an innocent, childlike creation. Henry welcomes it into his laboratory and asks it to sit. He opens up the roof, causing the Monster to reach out towards the sunlight. Fritz enters with a flaming torch, which frightens the Monster. Its fright is mistaken by Henry and Waldman for an attempt to attack them, and it is chained in the dungeon, where Fritz antagonizes it with a torch. Hearing Fritz screaming in the dungeon, Henry and Waldman find that the Monster has hanged Fritz. The Monster lunges at the two but they lock it inside. Realizing the Monster must be destroyed, Henry prepares an injection of a powerful drug and Waldman injects the drug into the Monster's back, rendering it unconscious.

Henry collapses from exhaustion, and Elizabeth and Henry's father take him home. There, he eventually recovers and prepares for his wedding, while Waldman examines the Monster. As he prepares to vivisect it, the Monster revives and strangles him. It escapes from the tower and wanders through the landscape, encountering a farmer's child, Maria. She asks him to play a game with her in which they toss flowers onto a lake. The Monster enjoys the game, but when he runs out of flowers, he throws Maria into the lake, inadvertently drowning her.

With preparations for the wedding completed, Henry is happy with Elizabeth. They are to marry as soon as Waldman arrives. Victor rushes in, saying that Waldman has been found strangled. Henry suspects the Monster. The Monster enters Elizabeth's room, causing her to scream. When the searchers arrive, they find Elizabeth in shock, then unconscious. The Monster has escaped.

Maria's father arrives, carrying his drowned daughter's body. He says she was murdered, and the villagers form a lynch mob to capture the Monster. During the search, Henry is attacked by the Monster. The Monster knocks Henry unconscious and carries him to an old windmill. The peasants hear the creature carrying Henry and find it climbing to the top, dragging Henry with it. The Monster hurls the scientist to the ground. His fall is broken by the wooden blades of the windmill, saving his life. Some of the villagers bring him home while the rest of the mob set the windmill ablaze, with the Monster trapped inside.

At Castle Frankenstein, Henry's father celebrates the wedding of his recovering son with a toast to a future grandchild.

== Cast ==
Bela Lugosi casting notice, 1931

- Colin Clive as Henry Frankenstein
- Mae Clarke as Elizabeth Lavenza, Henry's fiancée
- John Boles as Victor Moritz, Henry's friend
- Boris Karloff as The Monster (credited as ? in opening credits)
- Edward Van Sloan as Dr. Waldman
- Frederick Kerr as Baron Frankenstein
- Dwight Frye as Fritz, Henry's assistant
- Lionel Belmore as The Burgomaster, Herr Vogel.
- Marilyn Harris as Little Maria, a little girl
- Michael Mark as Ludwig, Maria's father
- Francis Ford as Hans (uncredited)

== Production ==
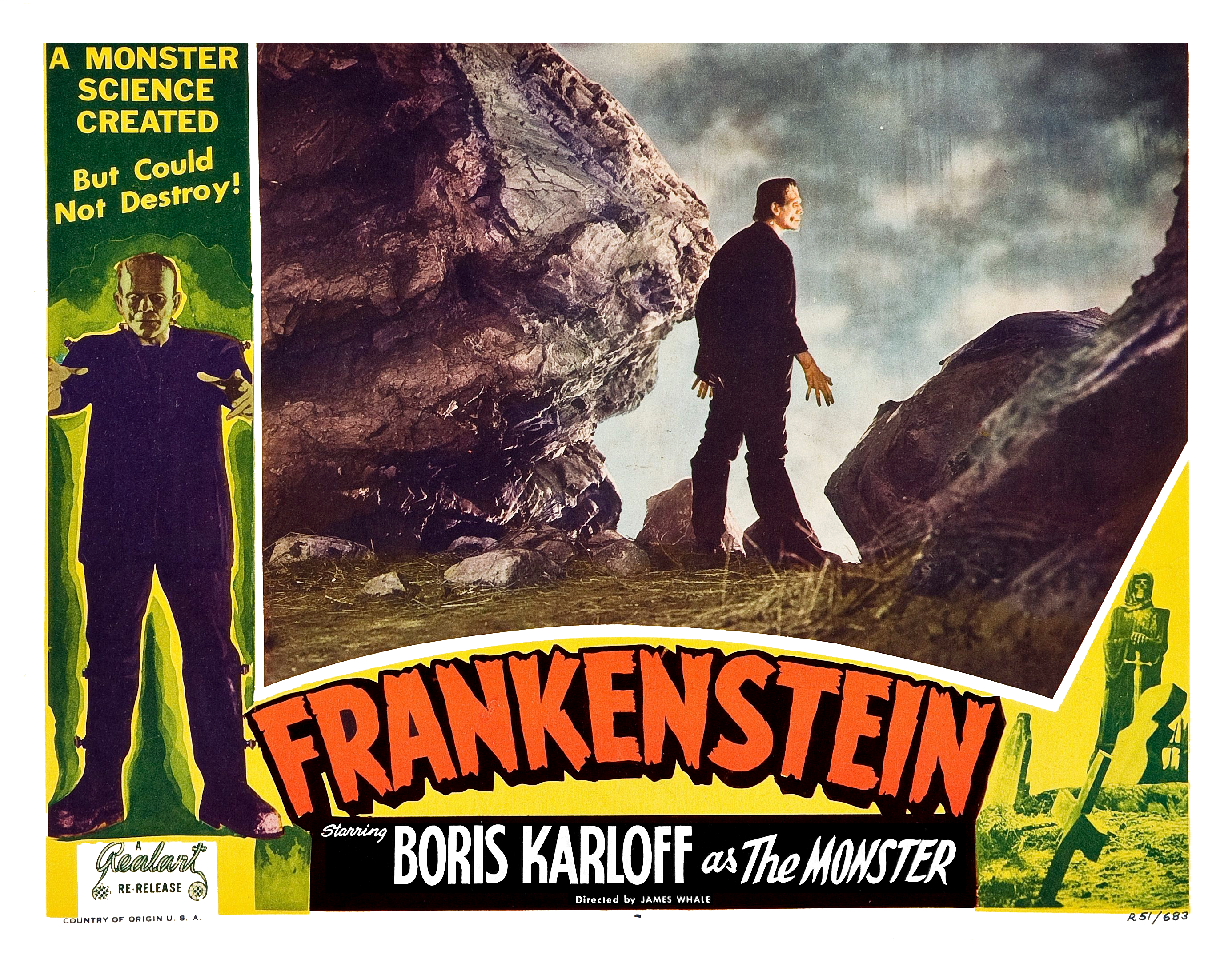
1951 re-release lobby card

In 1930, Universal Studios had lost $2.2 million in revenues. Within 48 hours of its opening at New York's Roxy Theatre on February 12, 1931, Dracula starring Bela Lugosi had sold 50,000 tickets, building a momentum that culminated in a $700,000 profit, the largest of Universal's 1931 releases. As a result, the head of production, Carl Laemmle Jr., announced immediate plans for more horror films. It purchased the film rights to John L. Balderston's planned stage adaptation of Peggy Webling's British stage adaptation of Mary Wollstonecraft Shelley's original novel.

Immediately following his success in Dracula, Lugosi had hoped to play Henry Frankenstein in Universal's original film concept. However, the actor was expected by producer Carl Laemmle Jr. to play the Monster (a common move for a contract player in a film studio at the time) to keep his famous name on the bill.

Frankenstein was also inspired by The Golem, a surreal novel based on Jewish folklore, and its film adaptation, The Golem: How He Came into the World a silent horror film where the Golem is a literal being rather than the ambiguous existence it was in the novel.

Although Lugosi's departure from the production is often regarded as one of the worst decisions in any actor's career, the part that Lugosi was offered was not the same character that Karloff eventually played. The initial director was Robert Florey, who had re-characterized the Monster as a simple killing machine, without a touch of human interest or pathos, unlike in the original Shelley novel. This reportedly caused Lugosi to complain, "I was a star in my country and I will not be a scarecrow over here!" Florey later wrote that "the Hungarian actor didn't show himself very enthusiastic for the role and didn't want to play it". However, the decision may not have been Lugosi's in any case, since recent evidence suggests that he was kicked off the project, along with director Robert Florey, when the newly arrived James Whale asked for the property and later cast Karloff, who resembled Whale.

Actors who worked on the project either were, or shortly became familiar to the fans of the Universal horror films. These included Frederick Kerr as the old Baron Frankenstein, Henry's father; Lionel Belmore as Herr Vogel, the Bürgermeister; Marilyn Harris as Little Maria, the girl the Monster accidentally kills; Dwight Frye as Frankenstein's hunchbacked assistant, Fritz; and Michael Mark as Ludwig, Maria's father.

Kenneth Strickfaden designed the electrical effects that were used in the "creation scene". They were so successful that such effects came to be considered an essential part of every subsequent Universal film involving Frankenstein's Monster. Accordingly, the equipment used to produce them has come to be referred to in fan circles as "Strickfadens". It appears that Strickfaden managed to secure the use of at least one Tesla Coil built by the inventor Nikola Tesla himself.

The film opened in New York City at the Mayfair Theatre on December 4, 1931, and grossed $53,000 (equivalent to $1,122,046 in 2025) in one week.

Florey and Lugosi were given the Murders in the Rue Morgue (1932) project as a consolation. Lugosi would later go on to play Frankenstein's Monster in Frankenstein Meets the Wolf Man a decade later, when his career was in decline (in the original shooting script the Monster spoke, canceling Lugosi's initial objection to the part, but his filmed dialogue sequences were cut prior to release, along with the premise that the Monster was blind, which was the way Lugosi had played it).

== Pre-Code era scenes and censorship history ==
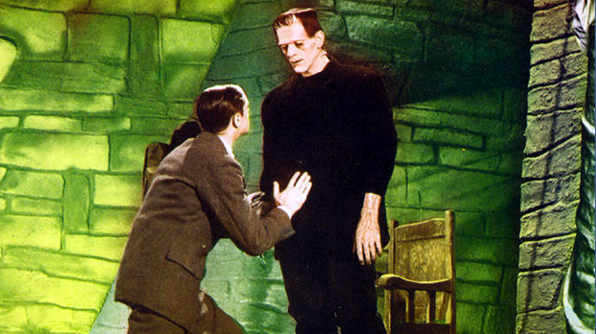
Colin Clive and Karloff in Frankenstein (1931). Cropped and edited lobby card

The scene in which the Monster throws Maria, the little girl, into the lake and accidentally drowns her has long been controversial. Upon its original 1931 release, the second part of this scene was cut by state censorship boards in Massachusetts, Pennsylvania and New York. Those states also objected to a line they considered blasphemous that occurred during Frankenstein's exuberance when he first learns that his creature is alive. The original relevant passage was:

VICTOR: "Henry, in the name of God!"
HENRY: "In the name of God? Now I know what it feels like to BE God!"

Kansas requested the cutting of 32 scenes which, if they had been removed, would have cut half of the film. Jason Joy of the Studio Relations Committee sent censor representative Joseph Breen to urge them to reconsider. Eventually, an edited version was released in Kansas.

As with many pre-Code films that were reissued after strict enforcement of the Production Code in 1934, Universal made cuts from the original camera negative, and thus most of the excised footage was lost. However, the scene of the girl being thrown into the lake was rediscovered during the early 1980s in the collection of the British National Film Archive, and it has been restored to modern prints of the film.

In the Irish Free State, the film was banned on February 5, 1932, for being demoralizing and unsuitable for children or "nervous people" – age-restricted certificates were not introduced in the country until 1965. The decision was overturned by the Appeal Board on March 8, and the film was passed uncut on March 9. The film was successfully banned in Northern Ireland, Quebec, Sweden, Italy, and Czechoslovakia.

== Reception ==
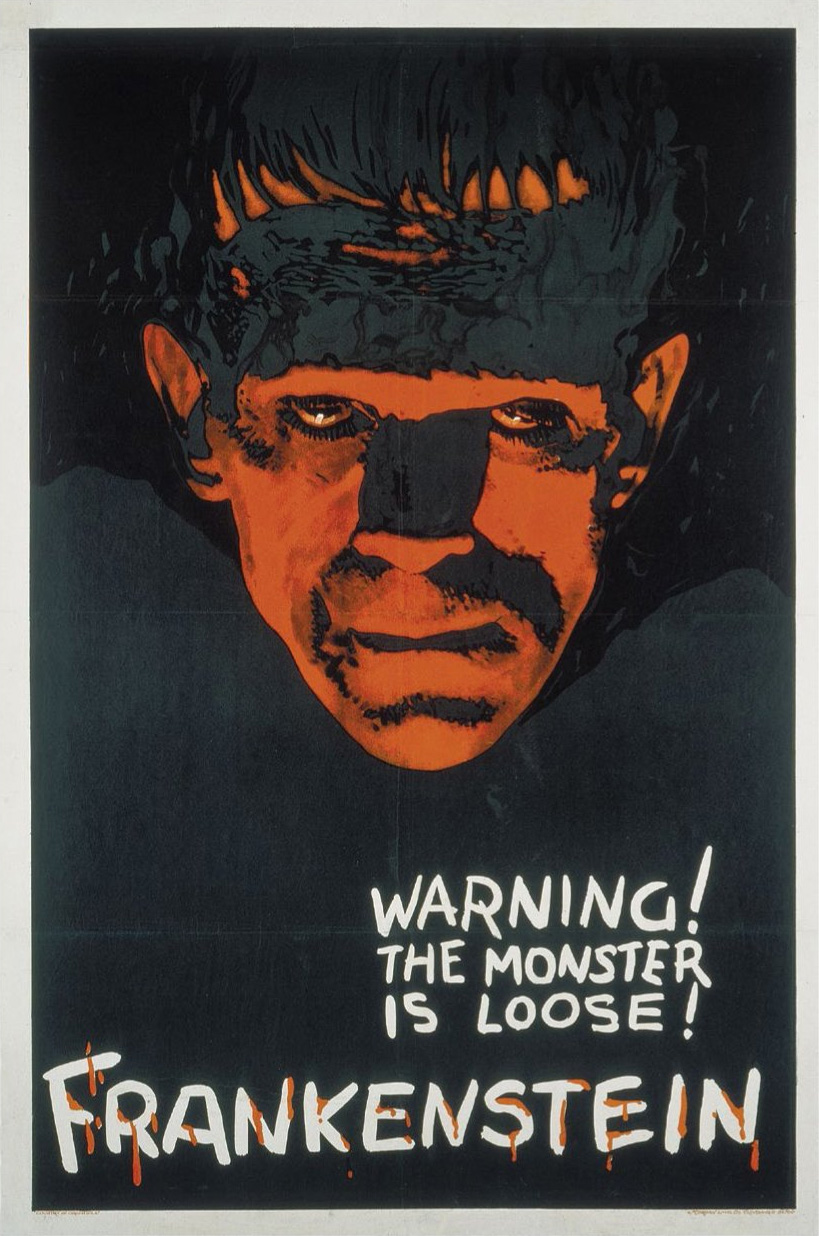
Theatrical teaser poster by 1930s Universal art director Karoly Grosz: "Warning! The Monster Is Loose!"

The New York Times film critic Mordaunt Hall gave Frankenstein a very positive review. He said that the film "aroused so much excitement at the Mayfair yesterday that many in the audience laughed to cover their true feelings. [T]here is no denying that it is far and away the most effective thing of its kind. Beside it Dracula is tame and, incidentally, Dracula was produced by the same firm".

Film Daily also lauded the picture, calling it a "gruesome, chill-producing and exciting drama" that was "produced intelligently and lavishly and with a grade of photography that is superb".

Variety reported that it "looks like a Dracula plus, touching a new peak in horror plays", and described Karloff's performance as "a fascinating acting bit of mesmerism". Its review also singled out the look of the film as uniquely praiseworthy, calling the photography "splendid" and the lighting "the last word in ingenuity, since much of the footage calls for dim or night effect and the manipulation of shadows to intensify the ghostly atmosphere".

John Mosher of The New Yorker was less enthused, calling the film only a "moderate success" and writing that "the makeup department has a triumph to its credit in the monster and there lie the thrills of the picture, but the general fantasy lacks the vitality which that little Mrs. P.B. Shelley was able to give her book".

The film was banned in China due to falling under the category of "superstitious films" as a result of its "strangeness" and unscientific elements.

Frankenstein has continued to receive acclaim from critics and is widely regarded as one of the best films of 1931, as well as one of the greatest movies of all time. On the review aggregator website Rotten Tomatoes, 94% of 110 critics' reviews are positive, with an average rating of 9/10. The website's consensus reads: "Still unnerving to this day, Frankenstein adroitly explores the fine line between genius and madness, and features Boris Karloff's legendary, frightening performance as the monster." Metacritic, which uses a weighted average, assigned the film a score of 91 out of 100, based on 15 critics, indicating "universal acclaim".

In 1991, the film was selected for preservation in the United States National Film Registry as being deemed "culturally, historically or aesthetically significant". In 2004, The New York Times placed the film on its Best 1000 Movies Ever list.

Frankenstein also received recognition from the American Film Institute. It was named the 87th greatest movie of all time on 100 Years... 100 Movies. The line "It's alive! It's alive!" was ranked as the 49th greatest movie quote in American cinema. The film was on the ballot for several of AFI's 100 series lists, including AFI's 10 Top 10 for the sci-fi category, 100 Years... 100 Movies (10th Anniversary Edition), and twice on 100 Years... 100 Heroes and Villains for both Henry Frankenstein and the Monster in the villains category.

The film was ranked number 56 on AFI's 100 Years... 100 Thrills, a list of America's most heart-pounding movies. It was also ranked number 27 on Bravo's 100 Scariest Movie Moments. Additionally, the Chicago Film Critics Association named it the 14th scariest film ever made.

=== Box office ===
The film was a commercial success. In June 1932, the film had earned reported rentals of $1.4 million. In 1943, Universal reported it had earned a profit of $708,871. By 1953, all the Frankenstein re-releases earned an estimated profit of $12 million.

== Home media ==
In 1986, MCA Home Video released Frankenstein on LaserDisc. This release restored all the cut footage, as well as most of Frankenstein's "In the name of God!" line. In the 1990s, MCA/Universal Home Video released the film on VHS as part of the "Universal Monsters Classic Collection", a series of releases of Universal Classic Monsters films.

In 1999, Universal released Frankenstein on VHS and DVD as part of the "Classic Monster Collection"; this release restored the rest of the censored material. In April 2004, Universal released Frankenstein: The Legacy Collection on DVD as part of the "Universal Legacy Collection". This two-disc release includes Frankenstein, Bride of Frankenstein, Son of Frankenstein, The Ghost of Frankenstein and House of Frankenstein. In September 2006, Universal released Frankenstein on DVD as a two-disc "75th Anniversary Edition", as part of the "Universal Legacy Series".

In 2012, Frankenstein was released on Blu-ray as part of the Universal Classic Monsters: The Essential Collection box set, which also includes a total of nine films from the Universal Classic Monsters series. In September 2013, Frankenstein received a standalone Blu-ray release. That same year, Frankenstein was included as part of the six-film Blu-ray set Universal Classic Monsters Collection, which also includes Dracula, The Mummy, The Invisible Man, Bride of Frankenstein, and The Wolf Man. The next year, Universal released Frankenstein: Complete Legacy Collection on DVD. This set contains eight films: Frankenstein, Bride of Frankenstein, Son of Frankenstein, The Ghost of Frankenstein, Frankenstein Meets the Wolf Man, House of Frankenstein, House of Dracula, and Abbott and Costello Meet Frankenstein. In 2015, the six-film Universal Classic Monsters Collection was released on DVD. In 2016, Frankenstein received a Walmart-exclusive Blu-ray release featuring a glow-in-the-dark cover. That same year, the Complete Legacy Collection was released on Blu-ray. In September 2017, the film received a Best Buy-exclusive SteelBook Blu-ray release with cover artwork by Alex Ross.

Frankenstein and its sequels were included in the Universal Classic Monsters: Complete 30-Film Collection Blu-ray box set in August 2018. This box set also received a DVD release. Later in October, Frankenstein was included as part of a limited edition Best Buy-exclusive Blu-ray set titled Universal Classic Monsters: The Essential Collection, which features artwork by Alex Ross. Universal Pictures Home Entertainment released the film on 4K Ultra HD Blu-ray on October 5, 2021.

== Sequels ==
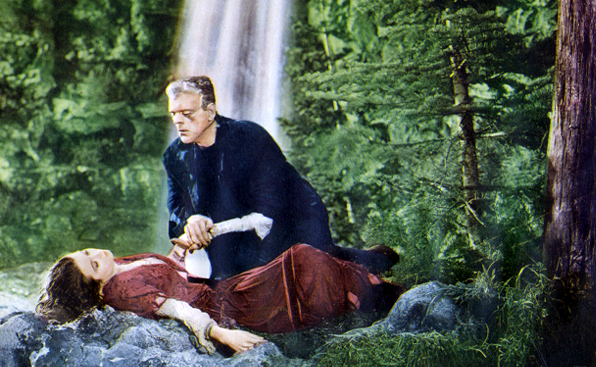
Karloff in Bride of Frankenstein. Cropped and edited lobby card

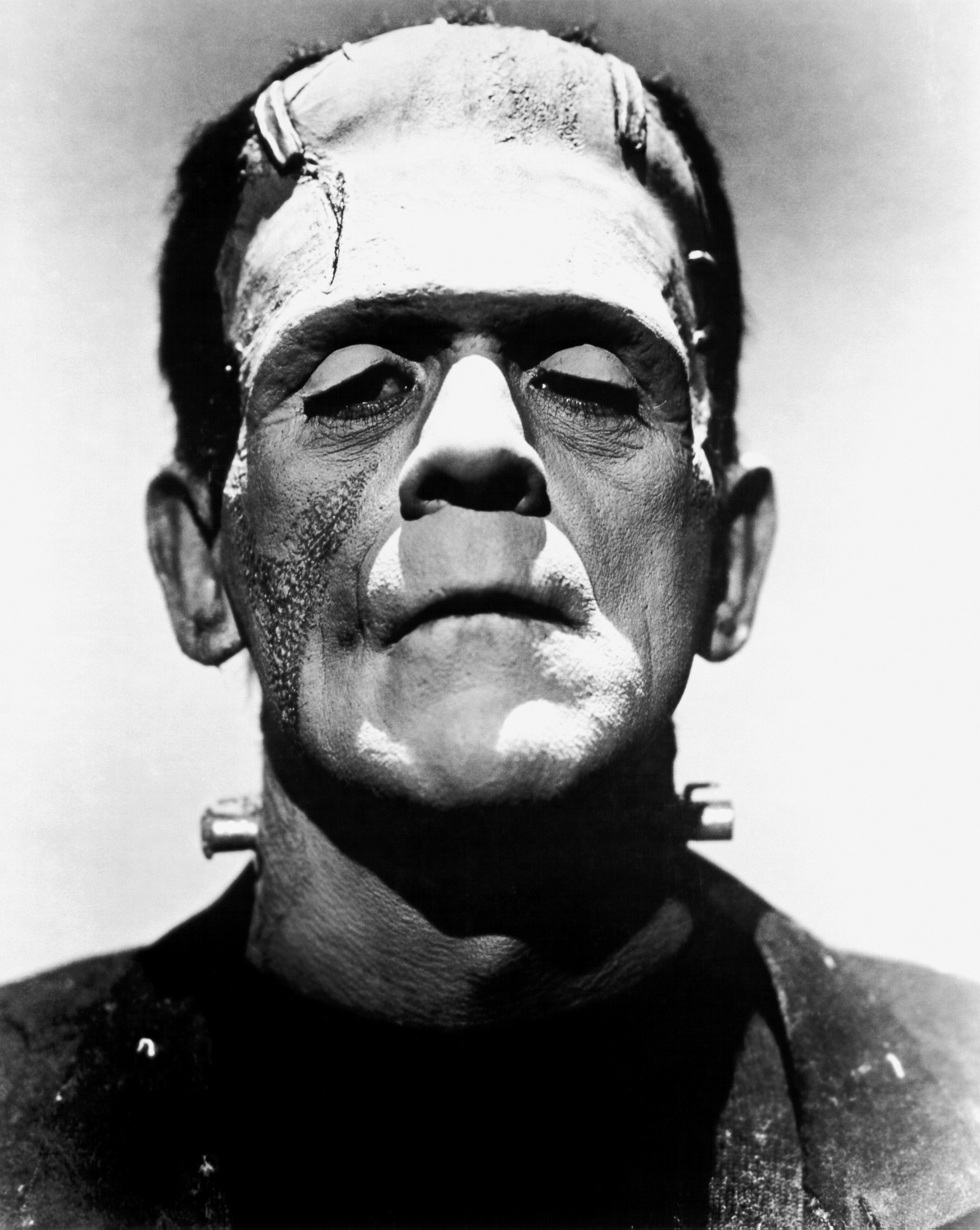
Karloff in Bride of Frankenstein (1935)

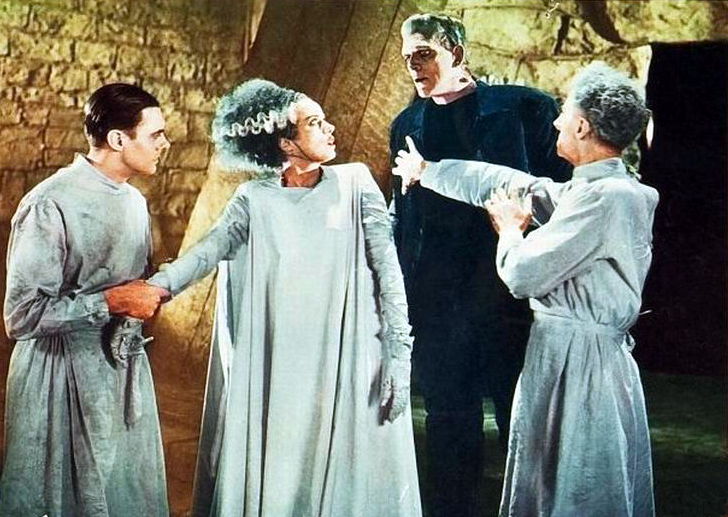
Colin Clive, Elsa Lanchester, Karloff and Ernest Thesiger in Bride of Frankenstein. Cropped and edited lobby card

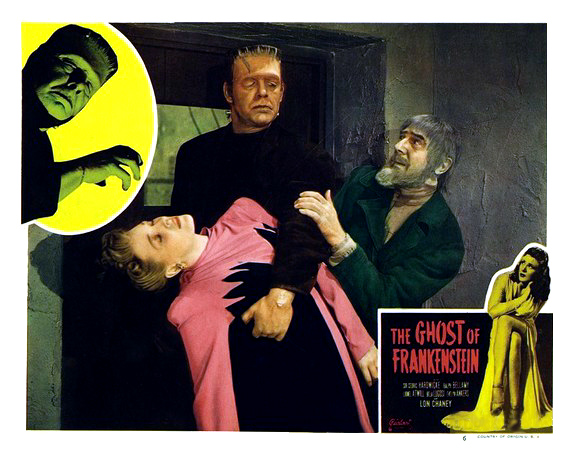
Lon Chaney Jr. as the monster, Evelyn Ankers, and Bela Lugosi as Ygor in The Ghost of Frankenstein (1942). Cropped and edited lobby card

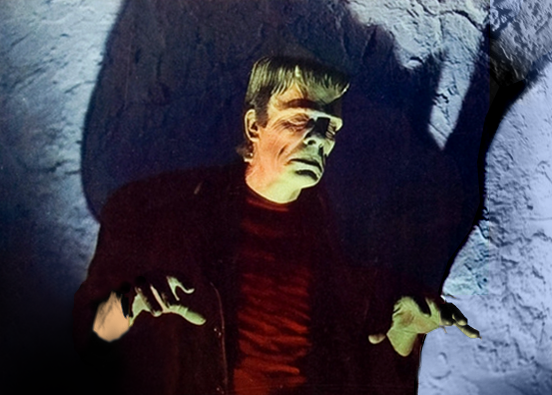
Glenn Strange as the monster in House of Dracula (1945). Cropped and edited lobby card

Frankenstein was followed by a string of sequels, beginning with Bride of Frankenstein (1935), in which Elsa Lanchester plays the Monster's bride.

The next sequel, Son of Frankenstein (1939), was made, like all those that followed, without Whale or Clive (the latter of whom had died in 1937). This film featured Karloff's last full film performance as the Monster. Son of Frankenstein presented Basil Rathbone as Baron Wolf von Frankenstein, Bela Lugosi as bearded hunchback Ygor, and Lionel Atwill as Inspector Krogh.

The Ghost of Frankenstein was released in 1942. The film features Lon Chaney Jr. as the Monster, taking over from Boris Karloff, who played the role in the first three films of the series, and Bela Lugosi in his second appearance as the demented Ygor.

The fifth installment, Frankenstein Meets the Wolf Man, was released in 1943, directed by Roy William Neill and starring Bela Lugosi as Frankenstein's monster. This is also the sequel to The Wolf Man, with Lon Chaney Jr. returning as the Wolf Man.

In the follow-up, House of Frankenstein (1944), Karloff returned to the series, not to reprise his role as the monster but as the Mad Doctor; the monster was this time portrayed by Glenn Strange. Chaney Jr. returned as the Wolf Man. Dracula was also featured in the film, played by John Carradine.

Its sequel, House of Dracula (1945), featured the same three monsters—Dracula, Frankenstein's monster and the Wolf Man—with the same cast in their portrayals.

Many of the subsequent films which featured Frankenstein's monster demote the creature to a robotic henchman in someone else's plots, such as in its final Universal film appearance in the deliberately farcical Abbott and Costello Meet Frankenstein (1948) as well as the aforementioned House of Frankenstein and House of Dracula.

== Other adaptations ==
- Karloff would return to the wearing of the makeup and to the role of the monster one last time in a 1962 episode of the television show Route 66.
- The popular 1960s television sitcom, The Munsters, depicts the family's father Herman as Frankenstein's monster, who married Count Dracula's daughter. The makeup for Herman is based on the makeup of Boris Karloff.
- Frankenstein appears in Mad Monster Party? (1967), a Rankin/Bass Productions Halloween special, where Dr. Boris von Frankenstein (voiced by Karloff) invites various classic monsters to a reunion at his castle with intentions to announce his retirement and to name his successor.
- Mel Brooks' comedy Young Frankenstein (1974) parodied elements of the first three Universal Frankenstein films, while also using the original props built for the 1935 film, provided by their designer Kenneth Strickfaden. Brooks also recreated the movie into a 2007 Broadway musical of the same name.
- A live-action parody short film, Frankenweenie (1984), depicting Victor Frankenstein as a modern American boy and his deceased pet dog as the monster, was made by Tim Burton in 1984. Burton remade it as a full-length animated film in 2012.

=== Frankenstein's assistant ===
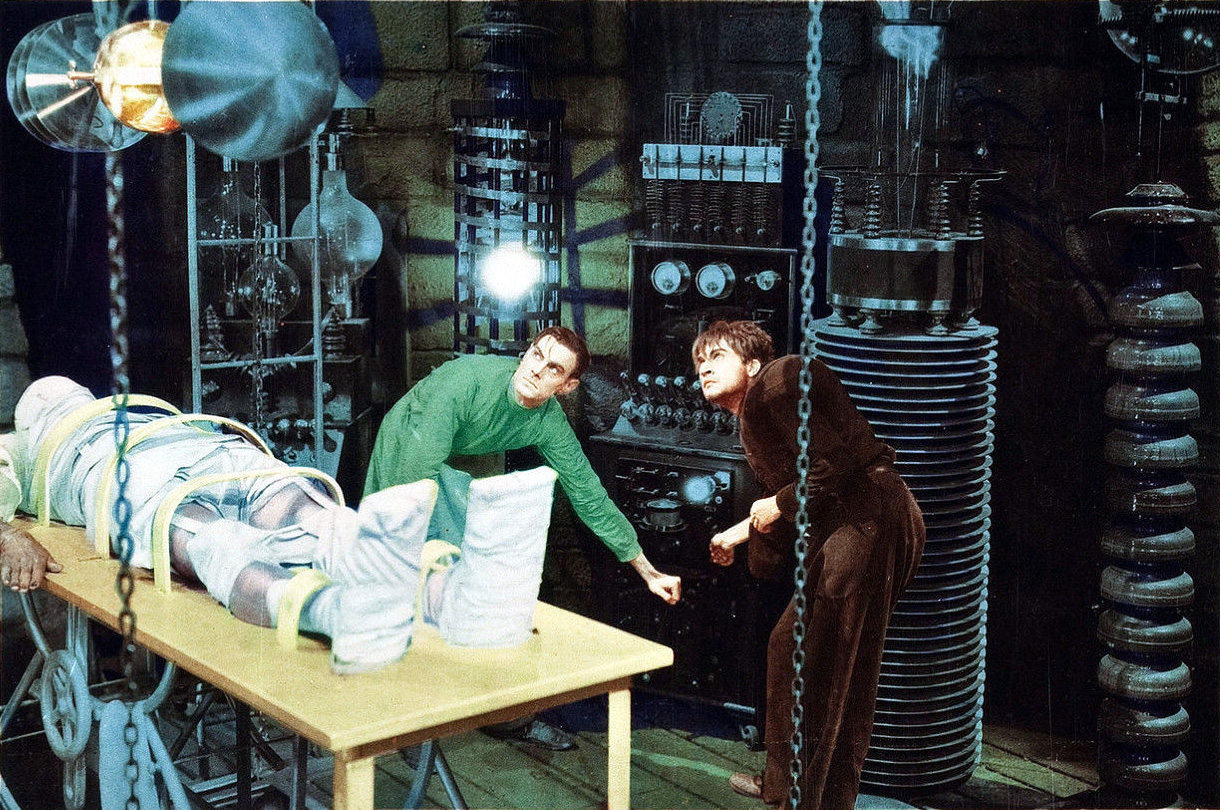
Colin Clive as Dr. Frankenstein and Dwight Frye as Fritz in Frankenstein (1931). Cropped and edited lobby card

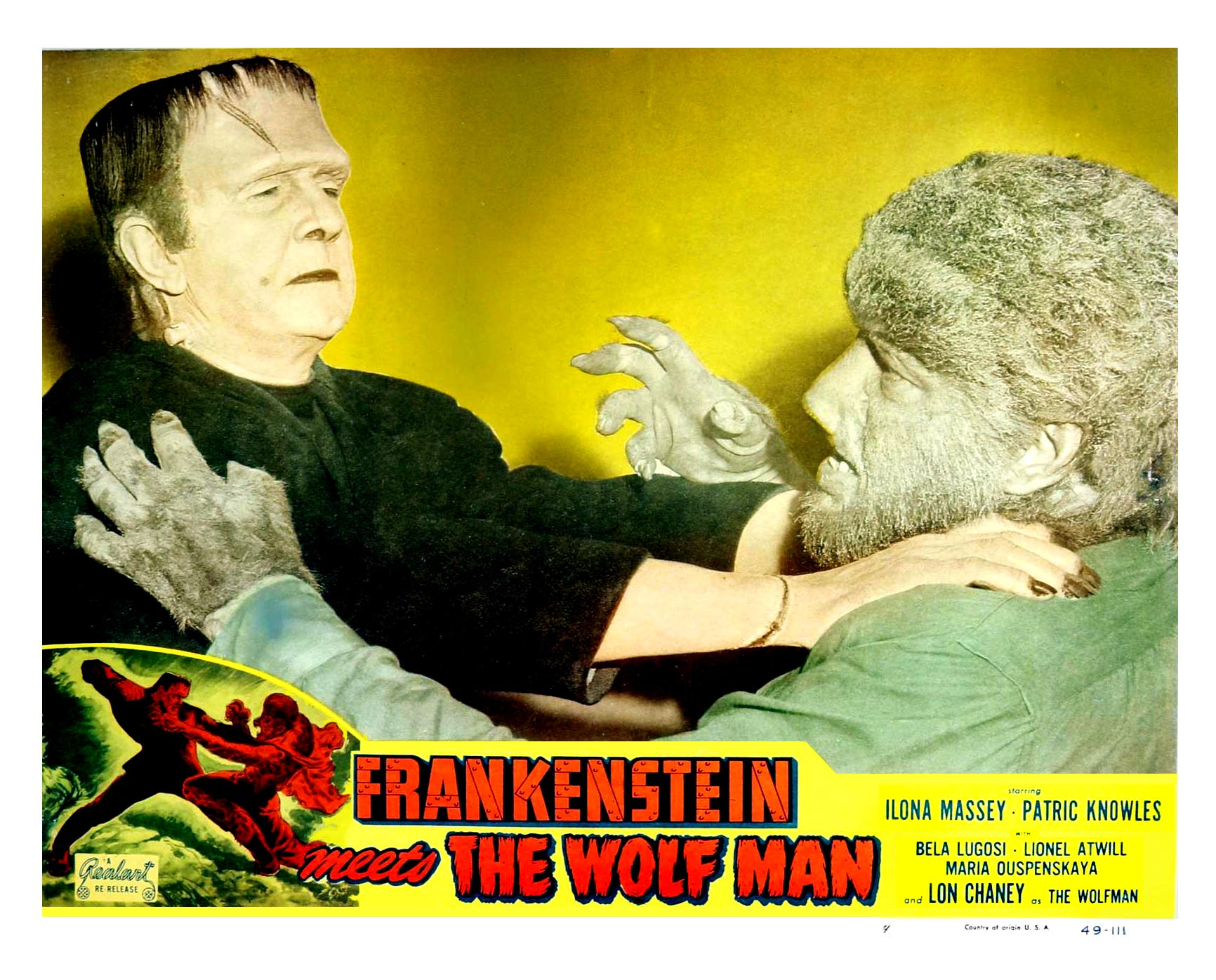
Re-release lobby card for Frankenstein Meets the Wolf Man (1943) with Bela Lugosi as the monster and Lon Chaney Jr. as the werewolf

Although Frankenstein's hunchbacked assistant is often referred to as "Igor" in descriptions of the films, he is not so called in the earliest films. In both Frankenstein and Bride of Frankenstein, Frankenstein has disabled assistants, played both times by Dwight Frye. In the original 1931 film the character is named "Fritz"; he is hunchbacked and walks with the aid of a small cane. Fritz did not originate from the Frankenstein novel, and instead originated from the earliest recorded play adaptation, Presumption; or, the Fate of Frankenstein, where he was played by Robert Keeley.

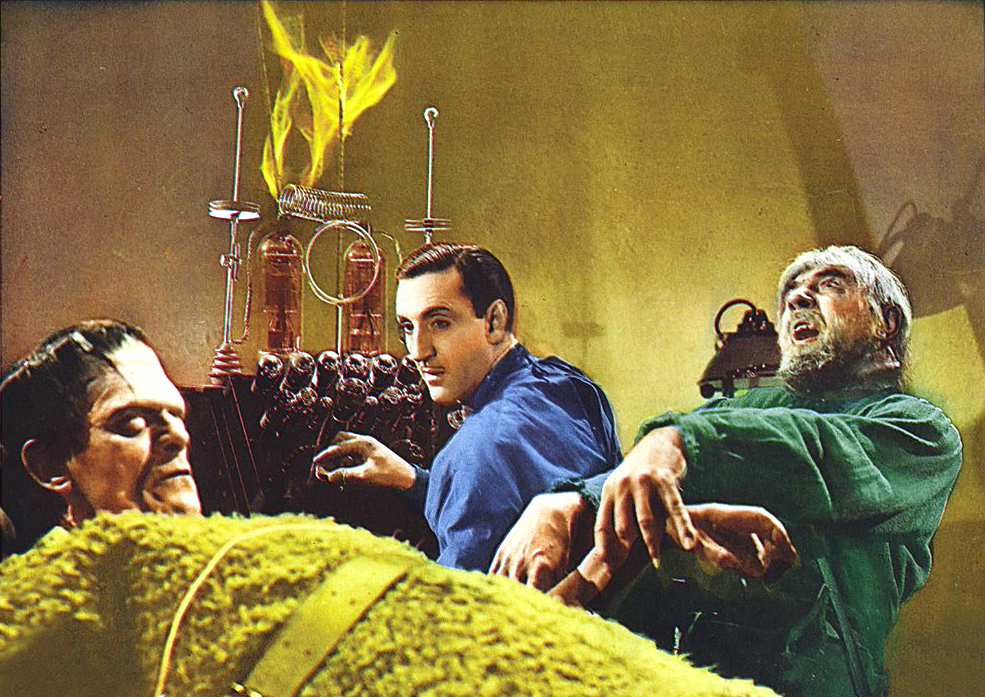
Boris Karloff as the monster, Basil Rathbone as Dr. Frankenstein's son, and Bela Lugosi as Ygor in Son of Frankenstein (1939). Cropped and edited lobby card

In Bride of Frankenstein, Frye plays "Karl", a murderer who stands upright but has a lumbering metal brace on both legs that can be heard clicking loudly with every step. Both characters would be killed by Karloff's monster in their respective films. Frye also appears in later films in the series, such as in Frankenstein Meets the Wolf Man (1943).

The genesis of the scene in which Frankenstein's assistant Fritz drops a jar labeled "normal brain" and replaces it with a brain in a jar labeled "abnormal brain" is believed to be based on the fate of Walt Whitman's brain at the American Anthropometric Society. Whitman had donated his brain after his death to the society for analysis to correlate intelligence with brain size. A 1907 paper by Edward Anthony Spitzka on the society's brain collection caused a minor sensation when it revealed that Whitman's brain had been accidentally destroyed when a "careless assistant" dropped the jar it was stored in. This story element was not present in the original 1818 Mary Shelley novel.

It was not until Son of Frankenstein (1939) that a character called "Ygor" first appears, here played by Bela Lugosi and revived by Lugosi in The Ghost of Frankenstein (1942) after his apparent murder in the earlier film. This character – a deranged blacksmith whose neck was broken and twisted due to a botched hanging – befriends the monster and later helps Dr. Wolf Frankenstein, leading to the "hunchbacked assistant" called "Igor" commonly associated with Frankenstein in popular culture. Regarding Son of Frankenstein, the film's director Rowland V. Lee said his crew let Lugosi "work on the characterization; the interpretation he gave us was imaginative and totally unexpected ... when we finished shooting, there was no doubt in anyone's mind that he stole the show. Karloff's monster was weak by comparison".

== See also ==
- Boris Karloff filmography
- List of films featuring Frankenstein's monster
- Frankenstein in popular culture
- Gothic film – Notable films
- 1931 in science fiction

== Bibliography ==
- Doherty, Thomas Patrick. Pre-Code Hollywood: Sex, Immorality, and Insurrection in American Cinema 1930–1934. New York: Columbia University Press 1999. ISBN 0-231-11094-4
- Nourmand, Tony; Marsh, Graham, eds. (2004). Horror Poster Art. London: Aurum Press Limited. ISBN 1-84513-010-3.
- Vieira, Mark A., Sin in Soft Focus. New York: Harry N. Abrams, Inc. 2003. ISBN 0-8109-8228-5
